= Michigan's 5th congressional district =

U.S. House district for Michigan

Coordinates: 44°04′55″N 83°41′24″W

- Interactive map of district boundaries since January 3, 2023
- Representative: Tim Walberg; R–Tipton
- Distribution: 77.49% urban; 22.51% rural
- Population (2025): 767,923
- Median household income: $74,410
- Ethnicity: 84.5% White; 5.2% Hispanic; 4.7% Two or more races; 4.1% Black; 0.9% Asian; 0.7% other
- Cook PVI: R+13

Michigan's 5th congressional district is a United States congressional district in the Lower Peninsula of Michigan. It includes all of Branch, Cass, Hillsdale, Jackson, Lenawee, Monroe (except for the city of Milan), and St. Joseph counties, southern Berrien County, most of Calhoun County, and far southern Kalamazoo County. The district is represented by Republican Tim Walberg.

From 1873 to 1993, the 5th was based in the Grand Rapids area of Western Michigan. Its most notable member was Gerald Ford, who in 1974 became the 38th president of the United States upon the resignation of Richard Nixon, at the height of the Watergate Scandal.

In 1993, this district essentially became the 3rd district, while the 5th was redrawn to take in Bay City, Saginaw and the Thumb, the core of the old 8th district. After the 2000 census, this district was extended to Flint, previously the core of the 9th district; however, it was geographically and demographically the successor of the 9th.

== Recent election results from statewide races ==
Year	Office	Results
2008	President	Obama 49.2% - 48.7%
2012	President	Romney 54% - 46%
2014	Senate	Lynn Land 52% - 44%
2014	Governor	Snyder 57% - 41%
2014	Secretary of State	Johnson 61% - 35%
2014	Attorney General	Schuette 60% - 35%
2016	President	Trump 60% - 35%
2018	Senate	James 57% - 40%
2018	Governor	Schuette 55% - 41%
2018	Attorney General	Leonard 58% - 37%
2020	President	Trump 61% - 37%
2020	Senate	James 61% - 37%
2022	Governor	Dixon 57% - 41%
2022	Secretary of State	Karamo 56% - 42%
2022	Attorney General	DePerno 58% - 39%
2024	President	Trump 63% - 36%
2024	Senate	Rogers 61% - 36%

== Composition ==
For the 118th and successive Congresses (based on redistricting following the 2020 census), the district contains all or portions of the following counties and municipalities:

Berrien County (28)

Baroda, Baroda Township, Berrien Springs, Berrien Township, Bertrand Township, Bridgman, Buchanan, Buchanan Township, Chikaming Township, Eau Claire, Galien Galien Township, Grand Beach, Lake Charter Township, Lincoln Charter Township (part; also 4th), Michiana, New Buffalo, New Buffalo Township, Niles (shared with Cass County), Niles Charter Township, Oronoko Charter Township, Pipestone Township, Royalton Township, Sodus Township, Stevensville, Three Oaks Three Oaks Township, Weesaw Township

Branch County (21)

All 21 municipalities

Calhoun County (22)

Albion, Albion Township, Athens, Athens Township, Burlington, Burlington Township, Clarence Township, Clarendon Township, Convis Township, Eckford Township, Fredonia Township, Homer, Homer Township, Lee Township, Leroy Township, Marengo Township, Marshall, Marshall Township, Newton Township, Sheridan Township, Tekonsha, Tekonsha Township

Cass County (21)

All 21 municipalities

Hillsdale County (27)

All 27 municipalities

Jackson County (27)

All 27 municipalities

Kalamazoo County (6)

Brady Charter Township, Prairie Ronde Township, Schoolcraft, Schoolcraft Township, Vicksburg, Wakeshma Township

Lenawee County (34)

All 34 municipalities

Monroe County (25)

Ash Township, Bedford Township, Berlin Charter Township, Carleton, Dundee, Dundee Township, Erie Township, Estral Beach, Exeter Township, Flat Rock (shared with Wayne County; part; also 6th), Frenchtown Charter Township, Ida Township, La Salle Township, London Township, Luna Pier, Maybee, Milan Township (neighbouring Milan City is in the 6th Congressional district), Monroe, Monroe Charter Township, Petersburg, Raisinville Township, South Rockwood, Summerfield Township, Whiteford Township

St. Joseph County (24)

All 24 municipalities

== List of members representing the district ==
The following is a list of all occupants of the congressional seat since the district was created at the start of the 38th Congress.

Member	Party	Years	Cong ress	Electoral history	Location
District created March 4, 1863
Augustus C. Baldwin (Pontiac)	Democratic	March 4, 1863 – March 3, 1865	38th	Elected in 1862. Lost re-election.	1863–1873 [data missing]
Rowland E. Trowbridge (Birmingham)	Republican	March 4, 1865 – March 3, 1869	39th 40th	Elected in 1864. Re-elected in 1866. Lost renomination.	1863–1873 [data missing]
Omar D. Conger (Port Huron)	Republican	March 4, 1869 – March 3, 1873	41st 42nd	Elected in 1868. Re-elected in 1870. Redistricted to the 7th district.	1863–1873 [data missing]
Wilder D. Foster (Grand Rapids)	Republican	March 4, 1873 – September 20, 1873	43rd	Redistricted from the 4th district and re-elected in 1872. Died.	1873–1883 [data missing]
Vacant		September 20, 1873 – December 1, 1873	43rd		1873–1883 [data missing]
William B. Williams (Allegan)	Republican	December 1, 1873 – March 3, 1877	43rd 44th	Elected to finish Foster's term. Re-elected in 1874. Retired.	1873–1883 [data missing]
John W. Stone (Grand Rapids)	Republican	March 4, 1877 – March 3, 1881	45th 46th	Elected in 1876. Re-elected in 1878. Retired.	1873–1883 [data missing]
George W. Webber (Ionia)	Republican	March 4, 1881 – March 3, 1883	47th	Elected in 1880. Retired.	1873–1883 [data missing]
Julius Houseman (Grand Rapids)	Democratic	March 4, 1883 – March 3, 1885	48th	Elected in 1882. Retired.	1883–1893 [data missing]
Charles C. Comstock (Grand Rapids)	Democratic	March 4, 1885 – March 3, 1887	49th	Elected in 1884. Retired.	1883–1893 [data missing]
Melbourne H. Ford (Grand Rapids)	Democratic	March 4, 1887 – March 3, 1889	50th	Elected in 1886. Lost re-election.	1883–1893 [data missing]
Charles E. Belknap (Grand Rapids)	Republican	March 4, 1889 – March 3, 1891	51st	Elected in 1888. Retired.	1883–1893 [data missing]
Melbourne H. Ford (Grand Rapids)	Democratic	March 4, 1891 – April 20, 1891	52nd	Elected in 1890. Died.	1883–1893 [data missing]
Vacant		April 20, 1891 – November 3, 1891	52nd		1883–1893 [data missing]
Charles E. Belknap (Grand Rapids)	Republican	November 3, 1891 – March 3, 1893	52nd	Elected to finish Ford's term. Lost re-election.	1883–1893 [data missing]
George F. Richardson (Grand Rapids)	Democratic	March 4, 1893 – March 3, 1895	53rd	Elected in 1892. (Note: With a plurality of 10 votes, Richardson received a certificate of election from the board of state canvassers. Incumbent Charles E. Belknap requested a recount in Ionia County, alleging irregularities. The Michigan Supreme Court ordered the recount on February 3, 1893, which counted a plurality of 19 votes for Belknap. The new board of state canvassers then issued a certificate of election to Belknap. The contest was brought to the U.S. House of Representatives on August 8, 1893. Following floor debate on the validity of the contestants’ credentials, the House seated Richardson, referring the matter to the Committee on Elections. Following further examination, the committee issued a report upholding Richardson’s claim to the seat.); Retired.	1893–1903 [data missing]
William Alden Smith (Grand Rapids)	Republican	March 4, 1895 – February 9, 1907	54th 55th 56th 57th 58th 59th	Elected in 1894. Re-elected in 1896. Re-elected in 1898. Re-elected in 1900. Re-elected in 1902. Re-elected in 1904. Re-elected in 1906. Resigned when elected U.S. Senator.	1893–1903 [data missing]
William Alden Smith (Grand Rapids)	Republican	March 4, 1895 – February 9, 1907	54th 55th 56th 57th 58th 59th	Elected in 1894. Re-elected in 1896. Re-elected in 1898. Re-elected in 1900. Re-elected in 1902. Re-elected in 1904. Re-elected in 1906. Resigned when elected U.S. Senator.	1903–1913 [data missing]
Vacant		February 9, 1907 – March 17, 1908	59th 60th		1903–1913 [data missing]
Gerrit J. Diekema (Holland)	Republican	March 17, 1908 – March 3, 1911	60th 61st	Elected to finish Smith's term. Re-elected later in 1908. Lost re-election.	1903–1913 [data missing]
Edwin F. Sweet (Grand Rapids)	Democratic	March 4, 1911 – March 3, 1913	62nd	Elected in 1910. Lost re-election.	1903–1913 [data missing]
Carl E. Mapes (Grand Rapids)	Republican	March 4, 1913 – December 12, 1939	63rd 64th 65th 66th 67th 68th 69th 70th 71st 72nd 73rd 74th 75th 76th	Elected in 1912. Re-elected in 1914. Re-elected in 1916. Re-elected in 1918. Re-elected in 1920. Re-elected in 1922. Re-elected in 1924. Re-elected in 1926. Re-elected in 1928. Re-elected in 1930. Re-elected in 1932. Re-elected in 1934. Re-elected in 1936. Re-elected in 1938. Died.	1913–1933 [data missing]
Carl E. Mapes (Grand Rapids)	Republican	March 4, 1913 – December 12, 1939	63rd 64th 65th 66th 67th 68th 69th 70th 71st 72nd 73rd 74th 75th 76th	Elected in 1912. Re-elected in 1914. Re-elected in 1916. Re-elected in 1918. Re-elected in 1920. Re-elected in 1922. Re-elected in 1924. Re-elected in 1926. Re-elected in 1928. Re-elected in 1930. Re-elected in 1932. Re-elected in 1934. Re-elected in 1936. Re-elected in 1938. Died.	1933–1943 [data missing]
Vacant		December 12, 1939 – February 19, 1940	76th		1933–1943 [data missing]
Bartel J. Jonkman (Grand Rapids)	Republican	February 19, 1940 – January 3, 1949	76th 77th 78th 79th 80th	Elected to finish Mapes's term. Re-elected in 1940. Re-elected in 1942. Re-elected in 1944. Re-elected in 1946. Lost renomination.	1933–1943 [data missing]
Bartel J. Jonkman (Grand Rapids)	Republican	February 19, 1940 – January 3, 1949	76th 77th 78th 79th 80th	Elected to finish Mapes's term. Re-elected in 1940. Re-elected in 1942. Re-elected in 1944. Re-elected in 1946. Lost renomination.	1943–1953 [data missing]
Gerald Ford (Grand Rapids)	Republican	January 3, 1949 – December 6, 1973	81st 82nd 83rd 84th 85th 86th 87th 88th 89th 90th 91st 92nd 93rd	Elected in 1948. Re-elected in 1950. Re-elected in 1952. Re-elected in 1954. Re-elected in 1956. Re-elected in 1958. Re-elected in 1960. Re-elected in 1962. Re-elected in 1964. Re-elected in 1966. Re-elected in 1968. Re-elected in 1970. Re-elected in 1972. Resigned to become U.S. Vice President.	1943–1953 [data missing]
Gerald Ford (Grand Rapids)	Republican	January 3, 1949 – December 6, 1973	81st 82nd 83rd 84th 85th 86th 87th 88th 89th 90th 91st 92nd 93rd	Elected in 1948. Re-elected in 1950. Re-elected in 1952. Re-elected in 1954. Re-elected in 1956. Re-elected in 1958. Re-elected in 1960. Re-elected in 1962. Re-elected in 1964. Re-elected in 1966. Re-elected in 1968. Re-elected in 1970. Re-elected in 1972. Resigned to become U.S. Vice President.	1953–1963 [data missing]
Gerald Ford (Grand Rapids)	Republican	January 3, 1949 – December 6, 1973	81st 82nd 83rd 84th 85th 86th 87th 88th 89th 90th 91st 92nd 93rd	Elected in 1948. Re-elected in 1950. Re-elected in 1952. Re-elected in 1954. Re-elected in 1956. Re-elected in 1958. Re-elected in 1960. Re-elected in 1962. Re-elected in 1964. Re-elected in 1966. Re-elected in 1968. Re-elected in 1970. Re-elected in 1972. Resigned to become U.S. Vice President.	1963–1973 [data missing]
Gerald Ford (Grand Rapids)	Republican	January 3, 1949 – December 6, 1973	81st 82nd 83rd 84th 85th 86th 87th 88th 89th 90th 91st 92nd 93rd	Elected in 1948. Re-elected in 1950. Re-elected in 1952. Re-elected in 1954. Re-elected in 1956. Re-elected in 1958. Re-elected in 1960. Re-elected in 1962. Re-elected in 1964. Re-elected in 1966. Re-elected in 1968. Re-elected in 1970. Re-elected in 1972. Resigned to become U.S. Vice President.	1973–1983 [data missing]
Vacant		December 6, 1973 – February 18, 1974	93rd		1973–1983 [data missing]
Richard Vander Veen (Grand Rapids)	Democratic	February 18, 1974 – January 3, 1977	93rd 94th	Elected to finish Ford's term. Re-elected in 1974. Lost re-election.	1973–1983 [data missing]
Harold S. Sawyer (Rockford)	Republican	January 3, 1977 – January 3, 1985	95th 96th 97th 98th	Elected in 1976. Re-elected in 1978. Re-elected in 1980. Re-elected in 1982. Retired.	1973–1983 [data missing]
Harold S. Sawyer (Rockford)	Republican	January 3, 1977 – January 3, 1985	95th 96th 97th 98th	Elected in 1976. Re-elected in 1978. Re-elected in 1980. Re-elected in 1982. Retired.	1983–1993 [data missing]
Paul B. Henry (Grand Rapids)	Republican	January 3, 1985 – January 3, 1993	99th 100th 101st 102nd	Elected in 1984. Re-elected in 1986. Re-elected in 1988. Re-elected in 1990. Redistricted to the 3rd district.	1983–1993 [data missing]
James Barcia (Bay City)	Democratic	January 3, 1993 – January 3, 2003	103rd 104th 105th 106th 107th	Elected in 1992. Re-elected in 1994. Re-elected in 1996. Re-elected in 1998. Re-elected in 2000. Retired to run for state senator.	1993–2003
Dale Kildee (Flint)	Democratic	January 3, 2003 – January 3, 2013	108th 109th 110th 111th 112th	Redistricted from the 9th district and re-elected in 2002. Re-elected in 2004. Re-elected in 2006. Re-elected in 2008. Re-elected in 2010. Retired.	2003–2013
Dan Kildee (Flushing)	Democratic	January 3, 2013 – January 3, 2023	113th 114th 115th 116th 117th	Elected in 2012. Re-elected in 2014. Re-elected in 2016. Re-elected in 2018. Re-elected in 2020. Redistricted to the 8th district.	2013–2023
Tim Walberg (Tipton)	Republican	January 3, 2023 – present	118th 119th	Redistricted from the 7th district and re-elected in 2022. Re-elected in 2024. Re-elected in 2026.	2023–present

== Recent election results ==
=== 2012 ===
Michigan's 5th congressional district, 2012
Party	Candidate	Votes	%
Democratic	Dan Kildee	214,531	65.0
Republican	Jim Slezak	103,931	31.5
Independent	David Davenport	6,694	2.0
Libertarian	Gregory Creswell	4,990	1.5
Total votes		330,146	100.0
Democratic hold			

=== 2014 ===
Michigan's 5th congressional district, 2014
Party	Candidate	Votes	%
Democratic	Dan Kildee (incumbent)	148,182	66.7
Republican	Allen Hardwick	69,222	31.2
Libertarian	Harold Jones	4,734	2.1
Total votes		222,138	100.0
Democratic hold			

=== 2016 ===
Michigan's 5th congressional district, 2016
Party	Candidate	Votes	%
Democratic	Dan Kildee (incumbent)	195,279	61.2
Republican	Al Hardwick	112,102	35.1
Libertarian	Steve Sluka	7,006	2.2
Green	Harley Mikkelson	4,904	1.5
Total votes		319,291	100.0
Democratic hold			

=== 2018 ===
Michigan's 5th congressional district, 2018
Party	Candidate	Votes	%
Democratic	Dan Kildee (incumbent)	164,502	59.5
Republican	Travis Wines	99,265	35.9
Working Class	Kathy Goodwin	12,646	4.6
Total votes		276,413	100.0
Democratic hold			

=== 2020 ===
Michigan's 5th congressional district, 2020
Party	Candidate	Votes	%
Democratic	Dan Kildee (incumbent)	196,599	54.4
Republican	Tim Kelly	150,772	41.8
Working Class	Kathy Goodwin	8,180	2.3
Libertarian	James Harris	5,481	1.5
Total votes		361,032	100.0
Democratic hold			

=== 2022 ===
Michigan's 5th congressional district, 2022
Party	Candidate	Votes	%
Republican	Tim Walberg (incumbent)	198,020	62.4
Democratic	Bart Goldberg	110,946	34.9
Libertarian	Norman Peterson	5,129	1.6
U.S. Taxpayers'	Ezra Scott	3,162	1.0
Write-in		1	0.0
Total votes		317,258	100.0
Republican hold			

=== 2024 ===
Michigan's 5th congressional district, 2024
Party	Candidate	Votes	%
Republican	Tim Walberg (incumbent)	269,215	65.7
Democratic	Libbi Urban	134,282	32.8
Green	James Bronke	6,379	1.6
Total votes		409,876	100.0
Republican hold			

== See also ==
- Michigan's congressional districts
- List of United States congressional districts

== Bibliography ==
- Govtrack.us for the 7th District - Lists Senators and representative, and map showing district outline
- The Political graveyard: U.S. Representatives from Michigan, 1807-2003
- U.S. Representatives 1837-2003, Michigan Manual 2003-2004
