= M-60 (Michigan highway) =

State highway in Michigan, United States

M-60
- M-60, Bus. M-60

Route information
- Maintained by MDOT
- Length: 104.224 mi (167.732 km)
- Existed: c. July 1, 1919–present

Major junctions
- West end: US 12 near Niles
- M-62 in Cassopolis; M-40 in Jones; US 131 / M-86 in Three Rivers; M-66 from Mendon to near Athens; I-69 near Tekonsha; M-99 near Homer
- East end: I-94 near Jackson

Location
- Country: United States
- State: Michigan
- Counties: Cass, St. Joseph, Branch, Calhoun, Jackson

Highway system
- Michigan State Trunkline Highway System; Interstate; US; State; Byways
← M-59	→ M-61

M-60 is an east–west state trunkline highway in the US state of Michigan. It runs from the Niles area at a junction with US Highway 12 (US 12) to the Jackson area where it ends at Interstate 94 (I-94). The trunkline passes through a mix of farm fields and woodlands, crosses or runs along several rivers and connects several small towns of the southern area of the state. The westernmost segment runs along divided highway while the easternmost section is a full freeway bypass of Jackson.

M-60 was originally designed in 1919 with the rest of the state highway system in Michigan. It ran roughly along its current route connecting downtown Niles to downtown Jackson. In the mid-1920s, the western end was extended to New Buffalo; since then several bypasses of the smaller towns along the highway were added. One of these bypasses resulted in the creation of an alternate route (Alternate M-60, Alt. M-60) through Concord; that route has since been decommissioned. When Niles was bypassed in the 1950s, a business loop (Business M-60, Bus. M-60) was created through town. After the western end was truncated to its current location, that business loop was converted to a business spur.

== Route description ==
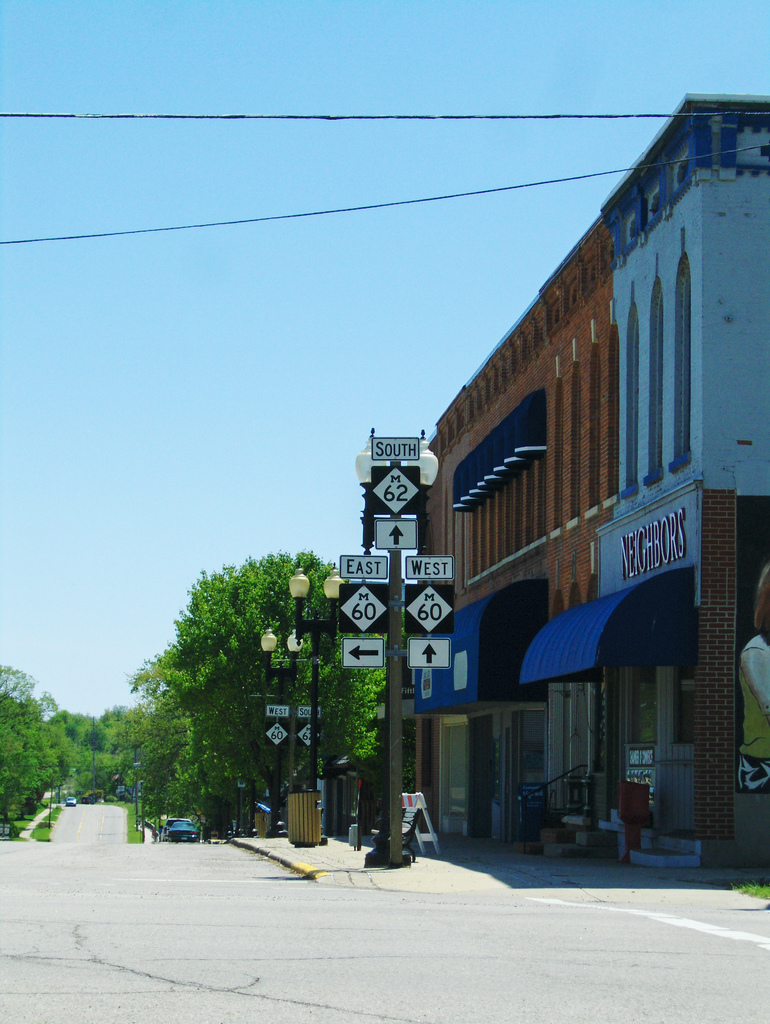
The intersection of M-60 and M-62 in Cassopolis

M-60 starts at an interchange along US 12 southeast of Niles in southwestern Cass County. From this interchange, the highway runs northeasterly along the divided highway on Detroit Road to an intersection with Bus. M-60 (Yankee Road). There, the main highway turns due east along the shore of Barron Lake. The trunkline continues through mixed farm fields and woodlands, running northeastward to Cassopolis and rounding Stone Lake on the southern approach to town. M-60 runs north–south through town on Broadway Street, merging with M-62 to run concurrently into downtown Cassopolis. M-60 turns eastward on State Street, separating from M-62, and leaves town while crossing a line of the Canadian National Railway.

East of Cassopolis, M-60 runs past Diamond Lake and through farm fields. At Vandalia, the highway passes Donnell Lake before meeting M-40 north of Bair Lake in Jones. East of Jones, the trunkline crosses into St. Joseph County and meets US 131 on the south side of Three Rivers. The two highways run concurrently northward through a retail business corridor to an intersection with Michigan Avenue. M-60 turns east along Michigan Avenue following Bus. US 131 into downtown. The business loop turns north at the same intersection where M-60 meets M-86 near the Rocky River crossing. Continuing eastward, M-60 passes the high school and Three Rivers Municipal Dr. Haines Airport while running along the St. Joseph River. The trunkline turns north, runs by Fishers Lake and continues out of town through farm fields. Near Mendon, the highway runs along the river again. East of town, M-60 meets M-66, and the two run east and northeast through Leonidas into the extreme northwest corner of Branch County.

South of Athens, M-66 turns northward and M-60 continues around Union City and into southern Calhoun County. The road runs through Burlington on Leroy Street. At Marshall Street. M-60 meets the southern end of M-311 which runs north to the Battle Creek area. M-60 continues east through farm fields to Tekonsha where it meets Interstate 69 (I-69) northwest of town. Continuing to Homer, the highway runs along Lehigh Street in town; M-99 merges into M-60 after the intersection with Hillsdale Street. East of town, the highway widens into a four-lane divided highway; M-99 turns north along this short section of roadway and M-60 reverts to a two-lane highway again. The trunkline crosses the Kalamazoo River at Concord after it crosses into Jackson County. At Spring Arbor, M-60 passes the campus of Spring Arbor University. Outside of Jackson, the highway widens out to a full freeway bypass around the west side of the city. This bypass has one interchange with Michigan Avenue near Jackson County Airport. North of this interchange, the highway picks up the Business Loop I-94 and crosses the Norfolk Southern Railway line in the area. The freeway ends at a trumpet interchange with I-94 northwest of Jackson.

M-60 is maintained by the Michigan Department of Transportation (MDOT) like other state highways. Among these responsibilities, the department tracks the level of traffic that uses the roadways under its jurisdiction. This is expressed using a metric called annual average daily traffic (AADT), which is a statistical calculation of the average daily number of vehicles on a segment of roadway. According to MDOT's surveys in 2009, the highest traffic counts were 12,547 cars and 999 trucks along the freeway immediately south of I-94 near Jackson; the lowest AADT was the 2601 cars and 384 trucks west of Union City. Only two sections of M-60 have been listed on the National Highway System (NHS): along the US 131 concurrency in Three Rivers and on the BL I-94 concurrency near Jackson. The NHS is a network of roads important to the country's economy, defense, and mobility.

== History ==
M-60 was designated with the rest of the original state highway system by July 1, 1919, on a series of roads running between Niles and Jackson by way of Cassopolis, Three Rivers and Tekonsha. (Note: The first state highways in Michigan were signed in 1919.) By the end of 1927, the western end was extended to terminate at US 12 at New Buffalo. In the early to mid-1930s, the Michigan State Highway Department (MSHD) realigned the New Buffalo–Niles section to bypass Galien and Buchanan, and the department extended US 112 concurrently along M-60 to New Buffalo. M-60 was rerouted around Concord in 1933, Tekonsha was bypassed by the MSHD in late 1936, and the highway was routed around Union City in 1937. The MSHD continued to improve the highway through the end of the 1930s. The last segment between Tekonsha and Homer was paved in 1940, making all of M-60 a hard-surfaced roadway.

In late 1949 or early 1950, the MSHD shifted M-60 through the Jones area to straighten the roadway. The US 131 bypass of Three Rivers opened in 1953; the US 131/M-60 concurrency became a Bus. US 131/M-60 concurrency through town as a result. On December 1, 1956, the highway department opened the first 6.6 miles (10.6 km) of a new four-lane divided highway around the south side of Niles, with the final 1.6 miles (2.6 km) of the bypass opening early the next year. Consequently, they converted the former route through town into a business loop. Bus. M-60 connected the bypass into downtown where it continued along Bus. US 112 back to US 112/M-60. At the end of the 1950s, M-60 was moved to a freeway bypass along the west side of Jackson; the final mile was also designated Bus. US 12 as both highways connected to the I-94/US 12 freeway north of the city. (Note: Several business loops were renumbered in 1961 as the US 12 designation was moved off the I-94 freeway to replace the US 112 designation in the state. Bus. US 12 routes, like the one in Jackson, were redesignated BL I-94 routes, and Bus. US 112 routes, like the one in Niles, became Bus. US 12 routes.) The western end was redesignated as a part of US 12 in the late 1961, and the M-60 designation was truncated off this roadway in 1966. M-60's routing has remained unchanged since.

== Major intersections ==
County	Location	mi	km	Destinations	Notes
Cass	Milton Township	0.000	0.000	US 12 – Sturgis, New Buffalo; East Main Street	Roadway continues as US 12
Cass	Howard Township	2.164	3.483	Bus. M-60 west – Niles	Eastern terminus of Bus. M-60
Cass	Cassopolis	13.753	22.133	M-62 south – Edwardsburg	Southern end of M-62 concurrency
Cass	Cassopolis	14.320	23.046	M-62 north – Dowagiac	Northern end of M-62 concurrency
Cass	Newberg Township	25.709	41.375	M-40 – Paw Paw, US 12	
St. Joseph	Three Rivers	33.328– 33.618	53.636– 54.103	US 131 south – Constantine, Middlebury	Southern end of US 131 concurrency
St. Joseph	Three Rivers	34.304– 34.506	55.207– 55.532	US 131 north – Kalamazoo Bus. US 131 north	Northern end of US 131 concurrency; western end of Bus. US 131 concurrency
St. Joseph	Three Rivers	35.372	56.926	Bus. US 131 north M-86 east – Coldwater	Eastern end of Bus. US 131 concurrency; western terminus of M-86
St. Joseph	Mendon–Leonidas township line	49.168	79.128	M-66 south – Sturgis	Western end of M-66 concurrency
Branch	Sherwood Township	59.394	95.585	M-66 north – Battle Creek	Eastern end of M-66 concurrency
Calhoun	Burlington	68.353	110.003	M-311 north – Battle Creek	Southern terminus of M-311
Calhoun	Tekonsha Township	72.679– 72.702	116.966– 117.003	I-69 – Lansing, Fort Wayne	Exit 25 on I-69
Calhoun	Homer	82.956	133.505	M-99 south – Hillsdale	Western end of M-99 concurrency
Calhoun	Homer–Albion township line	86.166	138.671	M-99 north – Albion	Eastern end of M-99 concurrency
Jackson	Summit Township	101.200	162.866	Spring Arbor Road	Southern end of freeway
Jackson	Blackman Township	103.255	166.173	BL I-94 east (Michigan Avenue) – Jackson	Southern end of BL I-94 concurrency
Jackson	Blackman Township	104.224	167.732	I-94 – Detroit, Chicago BL I-94 east	Northern end of BL I-94 concurrency; exit 136 on I-94
1.000 mi = 1.609 km; 1.000 km = 0.621 mi: Concurrency terminus

== Special routes ==
There have been two different special routes of M-60. Business M-60 (Bus. M-60) in Niles is still in existence, while Alternate M-60 (Alt. M-60) in Concord has been decommissioned.

=== Business M-60 ===
Business M-60
- Location: Niles
- Length: 2.554 mi (4.110 km)
- Existed: c. 1957–present

Business M-60 (Bus. M-60) is a state business spur running through the city of Niles and adjacent townships. The spur starts at the intersection with M-51 (Main Street, 11th Street) and runs eastward along a former routing of M-60 on Oak Street through a residential section of town. Near the Berrien–Cass county line, the highway passes south of the Jerry Tyler Memorial Airport. East of the airport, the street name changes from Oak Street to Yankee Road, and Bus. M-60 runs to its terminus at M-60 (Detroit Road). The total length is 2.554 miles (4.110 km), and 5,284–7,984 cars and 333 trucks use the route each day.

The business route was a loop route, continuing through downtown along Bus. US 112 when the designation was created in late 1956 or early 1957. M-60 was truncated west of Niles in 1966; at the same time, Bus. M-60 was truncated at its junction with Bus. US 12/M-51 (Note: In April 2010, the Bus. US 12 designation was decommissioned when the central portion was turned over to local control and an extended M-139 replaced it on its west end. The eastern section became just M-51.) near downtown.

=== Alternate M-60 ===
Alternate M-60
- Location: Concord
- Length: 1.671 mi (2.689 km)
- Existed: 1933–1934

Alternate M-60 (Alt. M-60) was an alternate loop route running through Concord. It acted as a "business route" into downtown Concord during its short lifetime after a bypass of town along M-60 was built. Its appearance predated the development of business routes in Michigan. Concord was bypassed in 1933, resulting in the creation of the alternate route. That route was turned over to local control the next year, decommissioning the designation.
