= Homer Community Schools =

School district in Michigan

Address
- 403 S. Hillsdale Street Homer, Calhoun County, Michigan, 49245; United States

District information
- Grades: Kindergarten–12
- Superintendent: Mike Leskowich
- Schools: 3
- Budget: $13,796,000 2021-2022 expenditures
- NCES District ID: 2618540

Students and staff
- Students: 834 (2024-2025)
- Teachers: 59.24 (on an FTE basis) (2024-2025)
- Staff: 118.41 FTE (2024-2025)
- Student–teacher ratio: 14.08 (2024-2025)

Other information
- Website: www.homerschools.net

Homer Community Schools is a public school district in Southern Michigan. In Calhoun County, it serves Homer and parts of the townships of Albion, Clarendon, Eckford, Fredonia, Homer, and Tekonsha. In Branch County, it serves parts of Butler Township. In Hillsdale County, it serves part of Litchfield Township. In Jackson County, it serves part of Pulaski Township.

== History ==
Homer School, built in 1890, served the community until it burned in 1943. A new school was built in 1947. It was expanded with a gymnasium and four classrooms in 1951. Lillian Fletcher Elementary was built nearby and dedicated on October 20, 1957.

In 1975, a bond issue passed to add classrooms to the elementary school and vocational and cafetorium additions at the high school. A 2005 addition connected the Elementary and Middle/High School buildings.

The current middle/high school building was added to the existing school and opened in January 2013. Kingscott Associates was the architect. Part of the 1947 section and the fifth grade wing were then demolished.

== Schools ==
Schools in the district share a building at 403 South Hillsdale Street in Homer.

Schools in Homer Community Schools district
| School | Notes |
|---|---|
| Homer High School | Grades 9–12. Built 2013. |
| Homer Middle School | Grades 5-8. Shares a building with Homer High School. |
| Lillian Fletcher Elementary | Grades K-4. Built 1957. |
