= Interstate 69 in Michigan =

Interstate Highway in Michigan, United States

Interstate 69
- I-69 highlighted in red

Route information
- Maintained by MDOT
- Length: 202.317 mi (325.598 km)
- Existed: October 11, 1967–present
- History: Completed October 17, 1992
- Tourist routes: I-69 Recreational Heritage Route; Lake Huron Circle Tour
- NHS: Entire route

Major junctions
- South end: I-69 at the Indiana border near Kinderhook
- US 12 in Coldwater; I-94 near Marshall; I-96 near Lansing; US 127 near East Lansing; I-75 / US 23 in Flint; I-94 near Port Huron
- East end: Highway 402 in Port Huron

Location
- Country: United States
- State: Michigan
- Counties: Branch, Calhoun, Eaton, Clinton, Shiawassee, Genesee, Lapeer, St. Clair

Highway system
- Interstate Highway System; Main; Auxiliary; Suffixed; Business; Future; Michigan State Trunkline Highway System; Interstate; US; State; Byways
← M-68	→ BL I-69

Interstate 69 (I-69) is a part of the Interstate Highway System that will eventually run from the Mexican border in Texas to the Canadian border at Port Huron, Michigan. In Michigan, it is a state trunkline highway that enters the state south of Coldwater and passes the cities of Lansing and Flint in the Lower Peninsula. A north–south freeway from the Indiana–Michigan border to the Lansing area, it changes direction to east–west after running concurrently with I-96. The freeway continues to Port Huron before terminating in the middle of the twin-span Blue Water Bridge while running concurrently with I-94 at the border. There are four related business loops for I-69 in the state, connecting the freeway to adjacent cities.

Predecessors to I-69 include the first M-29, US Highway 27 (US 27), M-78 and M-21. The freeway was not included on the original Interstate Highway System planning maps in the mid-1950s, but it was added in 1958 along a shorter route. Michigan built segments of freeway for the future Interstate in the 1960s, and the state was granted additional Interstate mileage in 1968 to extend I-69 north and east to Flint. Later extensions in 1973 and 1987 resulted in the modern-day highway. The first freeway segment designated as I-69 in Michigan opened in 1967, and the last was completed in 1992, finishing Michigan's Interstate System. US 27 previously ran concurrently with I-69 from the Indiana–Michigan state line north to the Lansing area, but this designation was removed in 2002.

== Route description ==
The entirety of I-69 is listed on the National Highway System, which is a network of roadways important to the country's economy, defense, and mobility. The freeway carries 91,100 vehicles on average each day between I-475 and M-54 in Flint and 14,085 vehicles between M-53 and Capac Road near the Lapeer–St. Clair county line, the highest and lowest traffic counts in 2012, respectively. I-69 carries the Lake Huron Circle Tour in the Port Huron area and the I-69 Recreational Heritage Route from the Indiana state line north to the Calhoun–Eaton county line. I-69 is mostly a four-lane freeway in the state of Michigan, with exceptions in the Lansing and Flint metro areas where it is six lanes and in Port Huron where it is three lanes westbound and three lanes eastbound until eastbound traffic splits into six lanes of local traffic to Port Huron and two lanes to the Blue Water Bridge.

=== Northward to Lansing ===
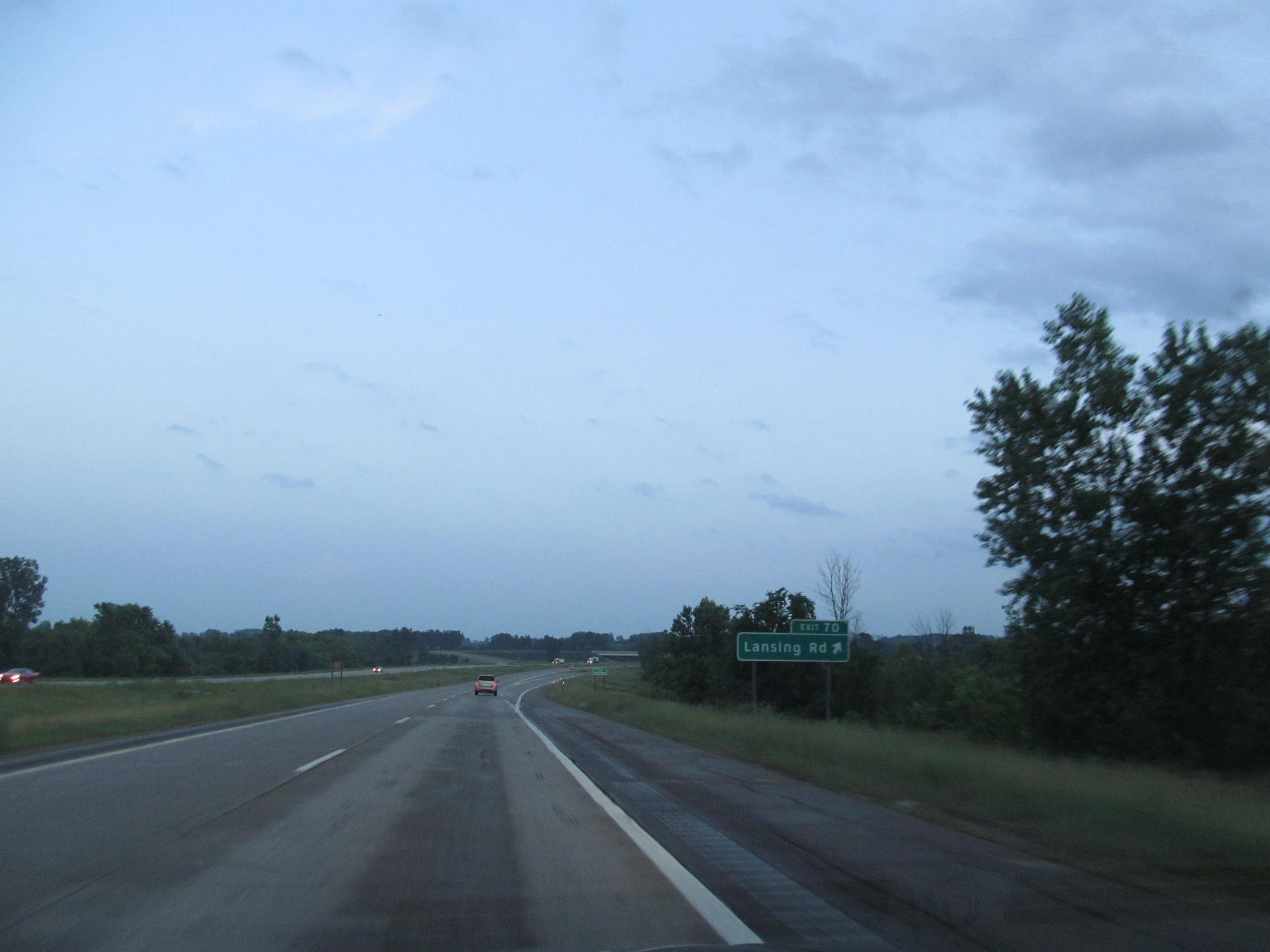
Approaching exit 70

I-69 in Michigan begins at the Indiana state line southeast of Kinderhook and just north of an interchange with the Indiana Toll Road, which carries I-80 and I-90. From there, I-69 runs northward through a mixture of Southern Michigan farmland and woodland in Branch County. A few miles north of the state line, the freeway passes Coldwater Lake State Park and its namesake body of water; north of the lake, there is a welcome center for the northbound lanes. I-69 curves around the east side of Coldwater, connecting to the city's business loop on the south of town. Immediately east of downtown, the freeway intersects the northern end of the business loop at an interchange that also features US 12 (Chicago Road). Farther north, the freeway turns to the northwest, crosses into Calhoun County and then over the St. Joseph River. I-69 turns back northward and bypasses Tekonsha to the town's west, intersecting M-60 in the process.

Curving around Nottawa Lake, I-69 continues northward through southern Calhoun County. It passes through an interchange that marks the southern terminus of M-227, a highway that connects northward into Marshall. The freeway crosses the Kalamazoo River and passes through an interchange with M-96 west of downtown Marshall. From that interchange northward, the BL I-94 designation is overlaid on I-69; the business loop ends at the cloverleaf interchange northwest of Marshall that marks the first of I-69's two junctions with I-94 in the state. North of I-94, I-69 has one more interchange at N Drive North before crossing into Eaton County.

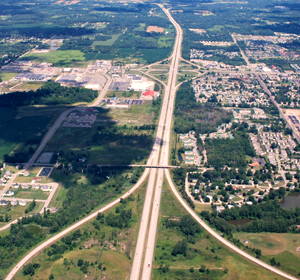
Aerial view looking north from the I-496 interchange along I-96/I-69 west of Lansing

In southern Eaton County, the freeway parallels the Battle Creek River north of the junction with M-78. Near Olivet, I-69 begins to turn in a northeasterly direction and curves around the north side of town. On the south side of Charlotte, I-69 turns northward, traversing an area to the east of downtown and crossing the former routing of US 27, which is now part of the business loop for the city. Farther north, the freeway has a junction with M-50, a bridge over the Battle Creek River, and an interchange with the northern end of the business loop next to Fitch H. Beach Airport. North of the airport, I-69 turns northeasterly again and parallels Lansing Road, the former route of US 27/M-78. The freeway meets the southern end of M-100 near Potterville and continues into the Lansing–East Lansing metropolitan area. Southwest of the state's capital city, I-69 crosses over Lansing Road near Lansing Delta Township Assembly, a factory for General Motors; northeast of the complex, I-69 merges into I-96. The combined I-96/I-69 runs northward through the suburban edges of the Lansing area, intersecting the western ends of I-496 and the BL I-69 for Lansing. The freeway enters Clinton County, and just north of a crossing of the Grand River, I-69 turns eastward to separate from I-96. As a part of the larger interchange with I-96, I-69 crosses BL I-96 (Grand River Avenue) without any connections.

=== Eastward to Port Huron ===
After leaving the I-96 concurrency, I-69 changes cardinal orientation and is signed as east–west from that point on. The freeway continues parallel to the Looking Glass River through suburban areas north of Capital Region International Airport. North of East Lansing, I-69 meets US 127 at a cloverleaf interchange. East of that junction, I-69 turns southeasterly passing the Hawk Hollow Golf Course and Park Lake on the way to meet the eastern end of BL I-69 just north of Lake Lansing. I-69 then turns northeasterly parallel to Lansing Road (Old M-78) to enter Shiawassee County. The freeway continues through Central Michigan farmlands, jogging north of Perry and Bancroft.

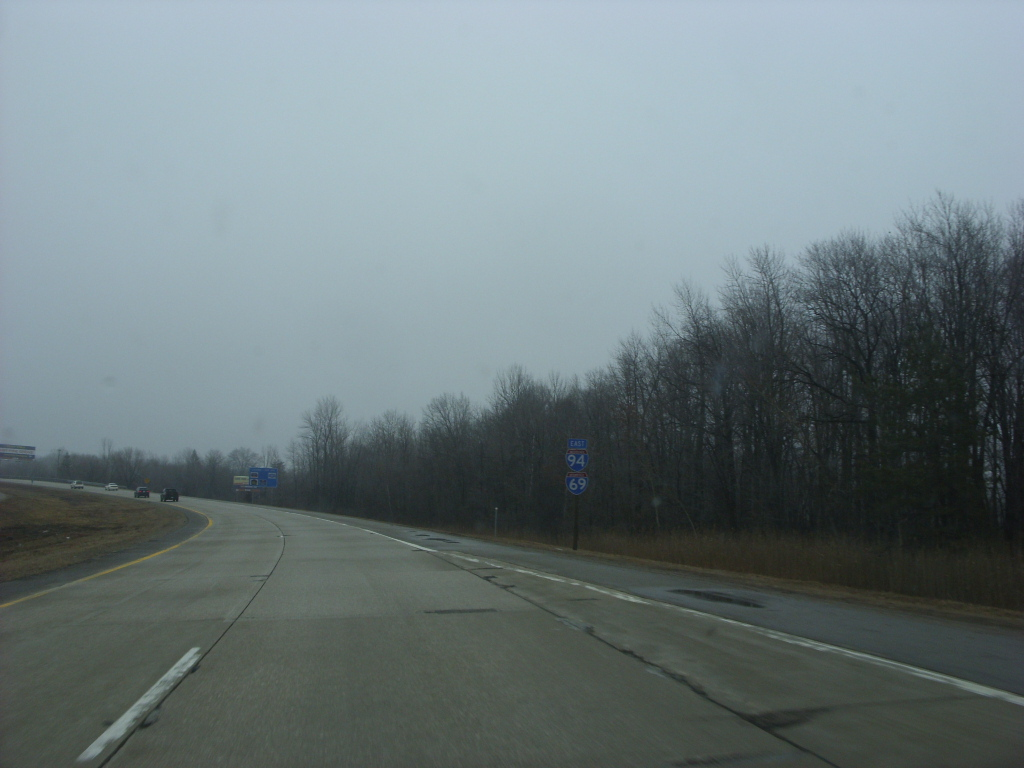
I-94/I-69 eastbound near Port Huron

At Durand, I-69 meets the southeastern end of M-71 on the northwest side of town. The freeway turns sharply to the northeast before turning due east near Lennon. The interchange with M-13 south of Lennon marks the Shiawassee–Genesee county line. Continuing eastward, I-69 parallels Miller Road to the north as far as the city of Swartz Creek; east of town, the two roadways cross. I-69 parallels a line of the Canadian National Railway as it enters the Flint metro area. The freeway intersects Bristol Road near the Bishop International Airport and then crosses I-75/US 23 southwest of downtown Flint. I-69, the railroad and the Swartz Creek all parallel into downtown Flint where the freeway intersects I-475 and M-54 (Dort Highway) before exiting the east side of the city.

I-69 runs eastward out of Flint parallel to the railroad. At Davison, it intersects M-15 before crossing into Lapeer County. In this area, the freeway traverses farmlands in the southern part of the region called The Thumb. It jogs to the north around Lake Nepessing, which is southwest of Lapeer. The freeway continues through farmland to Imlay City, where it meets M-53 before crossing into western St. Clair County. I-69 continues eastward through an interchange with M-19 at Emmett.

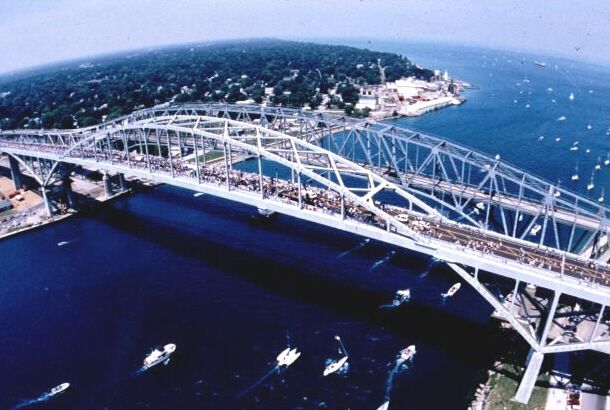
The twin-span Blue Water Bridge

Near Wadhams, I-69 curves around to the north to follow part of the Black River. On the east side of the community, the freeway turns back to the southeast as it enters the western edge of the Port Huron suburbs. I-69 turns again to run due eastward to intersect I-94. The two freeways merge in an interchange that also has connections to BL I-69. The freeway curves to the north and back around to the east to cross the Black River. On the eastern bank, I-94/I-69 travels through one last interchange, this one for M-25 and BL I-69/BL I-94. Past the interchange, the freeway crosses through the toll and customs plazas for the twin-span Blue Water Bridge. The I-69 designation officially ends at the international boundary in the middle of the St. Clair River where it connects with Highway 402 in the Canadian province of Ontario.

== History ==
=== Predecessor highways ===
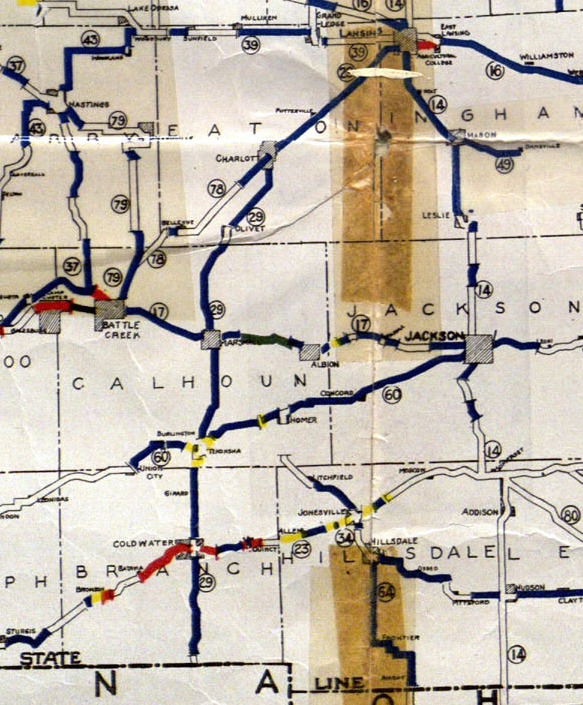
Map of central Southern Michigan in 1919 showing the route of M-29 Concrete Gravel Water-bound macadam

The first major overland transportation corridors in the future state of Michigan were the Indian trails. None of these followed the path of the modern-day I-69 however. The State Trunkline Highway System was created on May 13, 1913, by an act of the Michigan Legislature; at the time, none of the system's divisions corresponded to the modern-day I-69 either. In 1919, the Michigan State Highway Department (MSHD) (Note: The Michigan State Highway Department was reorganized into the Michigan Department of State Highways and Transportation on August 23, 1973. The name was shortened to its current form in 1978.) was required to signpost the highway system for the first time, and the state became the second after Wisconsin to do so. At the time, two different highways followed sections of the modern-day I-69 corridor. The original M-29 ran from the Indiana state line north to Charlotte and turned northeasterly to Lansing. The second highway was M-21 from Flint east to Goodells, a community west of Port Huron; the highway was extended to Port Huron by 1924.

On November 11, 1926, the United States Numbered Highway System was approved by the American Association of State Highway Officials (AASHO), (Note: AASHO was renamed the American Association of State Highway and Transportation Officials (AASHTO) on November 13, 1973.) and the new US 27 replaced M-29 from the state line northward to Lansing. By the end of the next year, M-78 was extended from Charlotte north and east of Lansing to a junction with M-47 near Pittsburg, north of the modern-day I-69. The section of M-78 north of Lansing was changed in 1929; the segment from Dewitt to Pittsburg was redesignated M-104, and M-78 was rerouted along a more southerly path through East Lansing to Haslett. By 1936, M-78 was extended from Haslett all the way into Flint to end at M-21. The first span of the Blue Water Bridge opened between Port Huron and Point Edward, Ontario, in 1938.

=== Interstate Highway era ===
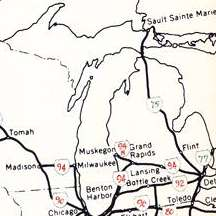
1958 planning map for Michigan's Interstate Highways

The first planning maps from 1947 for what later became the Interstate Highway System did not include a highway along I-69's route; instead a highway further west connecting South Bend, Indiana, with Kalamazoo was included. This alternative highway was maintained on the 1955 plan for the "National System of Interstate and Defense Highways", and numbered I-67 in August 1957. By June 1958, this freeway had been shifted further east and renumbered I-69, connecting Indianapolis, Indiana, with Marshall; no connections north and east to Lansing, Flint or Port Huron were planned as part of the Interstate Highway System. Around the same time, a section of M-146 near Port Huron was converted into an approach freeway for the Blue Water Bridge.

By the middle of 1960, the first section of freeway along M-78 was opened in the Lennon area. The next year, the freeway had been extended as far southwest as Durand from the end at Lennon. Also in 1961, the MSHD had proposed that the section of US 27 south of Lansing be built as an electronic highway under a bid through General Motors; the testing for such a roadway was ultimately done at Ohio State University instead.

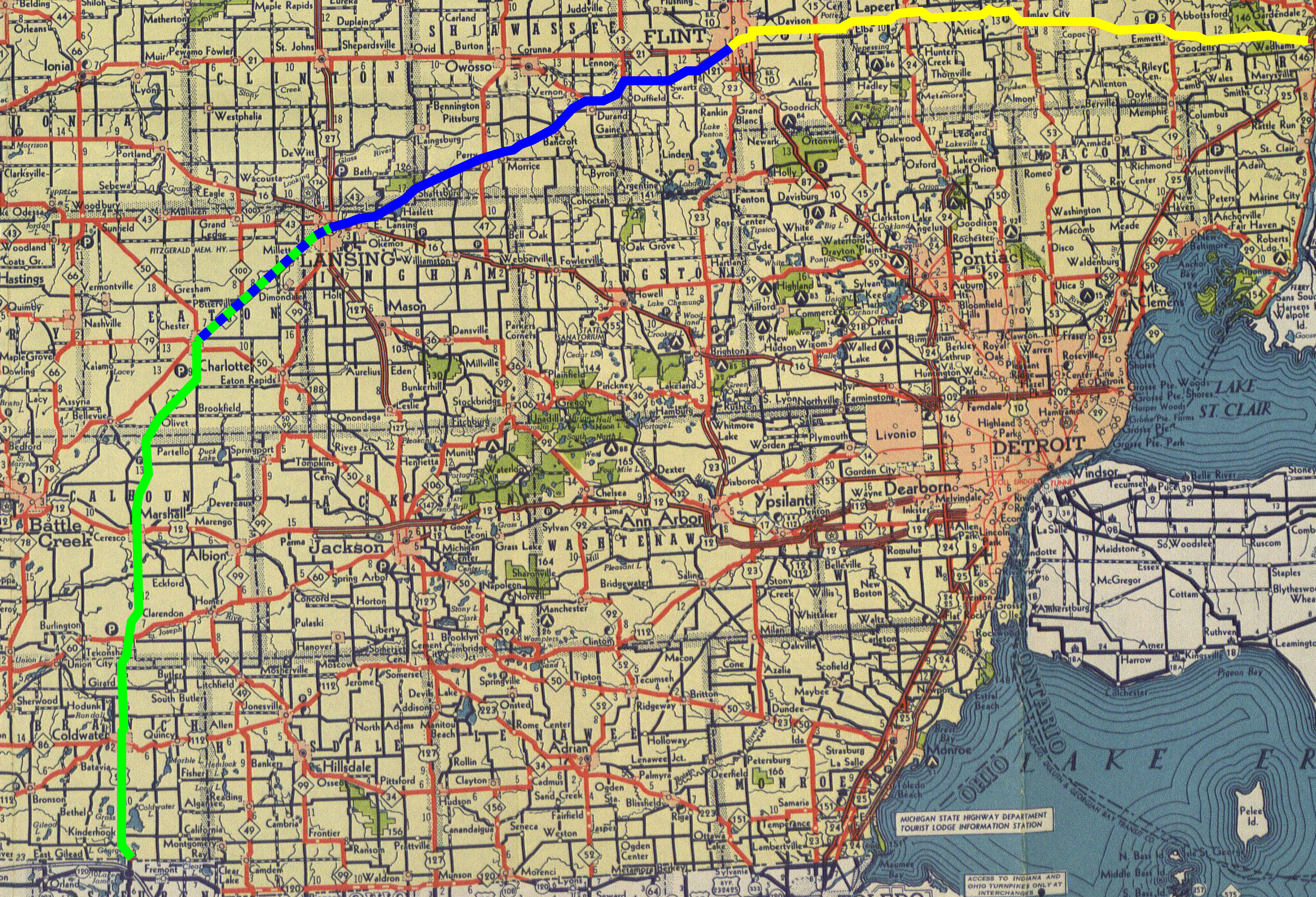
1957 map showing the predecessor highways to I-69 along its route in Michigan (click to enlarge) US 27 M-78 M-21

By the start of 1962, M-78 was a freeway from Perry at the junction with M-47 all the way to Swartz Creek near Flint. On December 12, 1962, I-96 was completed around the Lansing area, and M-78 was rerouted to follow it. A year later, I-496 was partially opened through the Lansing area, and M-78 was routed to follow it as well; the former route through downtown was redesignated Business M-78 (Bus. M-78). Around the same time, I-94 was extended along the Blue Water Bridge approach freeway.

The first freeway segment of M-21 on the east end was built from Wadhams to Port Huron in 1966. The next year, M-78's freeway was extended eastward to I-75/US 10/US 23 in Flint. On October 11, 1967, the first segment of I-69/US 27 was scheduled to open between the Indiana state line and Tekonsha. By the end of the year, the freeway extended north to I-94 northwest of Marshall. The MSHD requested additional Interstate Highway mileage in 1968 under the Federal-Aid Highway Act of 1968 including an extension of I-69 from Marshall to Port Huron; this extension was approved as far as I-75/US 23 in Flint on December 13, 1968.

A discontinuous section of M-78 freeway east of Flint was completed in 1969. The same year, I-475 was named the David Dunbar Buick Freeway, after the founder of Buick Motor Company in Flint; the same legislation, House Concurrent Resolution 22 of 1969 named the M-78 freeway through Flint for Louis Chevrolet. In 1970, the I-496 freeway was completed and the Bus. M-78 designation was removed through Lansing. A freeway segment between Flint and Lapeer opened in 1971. M-21 was routed down M-13 to the new freeway where it joined the M-78 designation from M-13 east. The section of M-21 formerly between M-13 and Bus. M-54 was redesignated M-56. The M-78 designation was replaced by I-69 in 1973 after a Temporary I-69 (Temp. I-69) designation was extended northward from Charlotte through Lansing to Perry. On September 4 of that year, I-69's designation was officially extended by Congress to end at I-475 on the east side of Flint; this extension, and all subsequent ones, was of non-chargeable mileage, or segments not financed through the Interstate Highway fund.

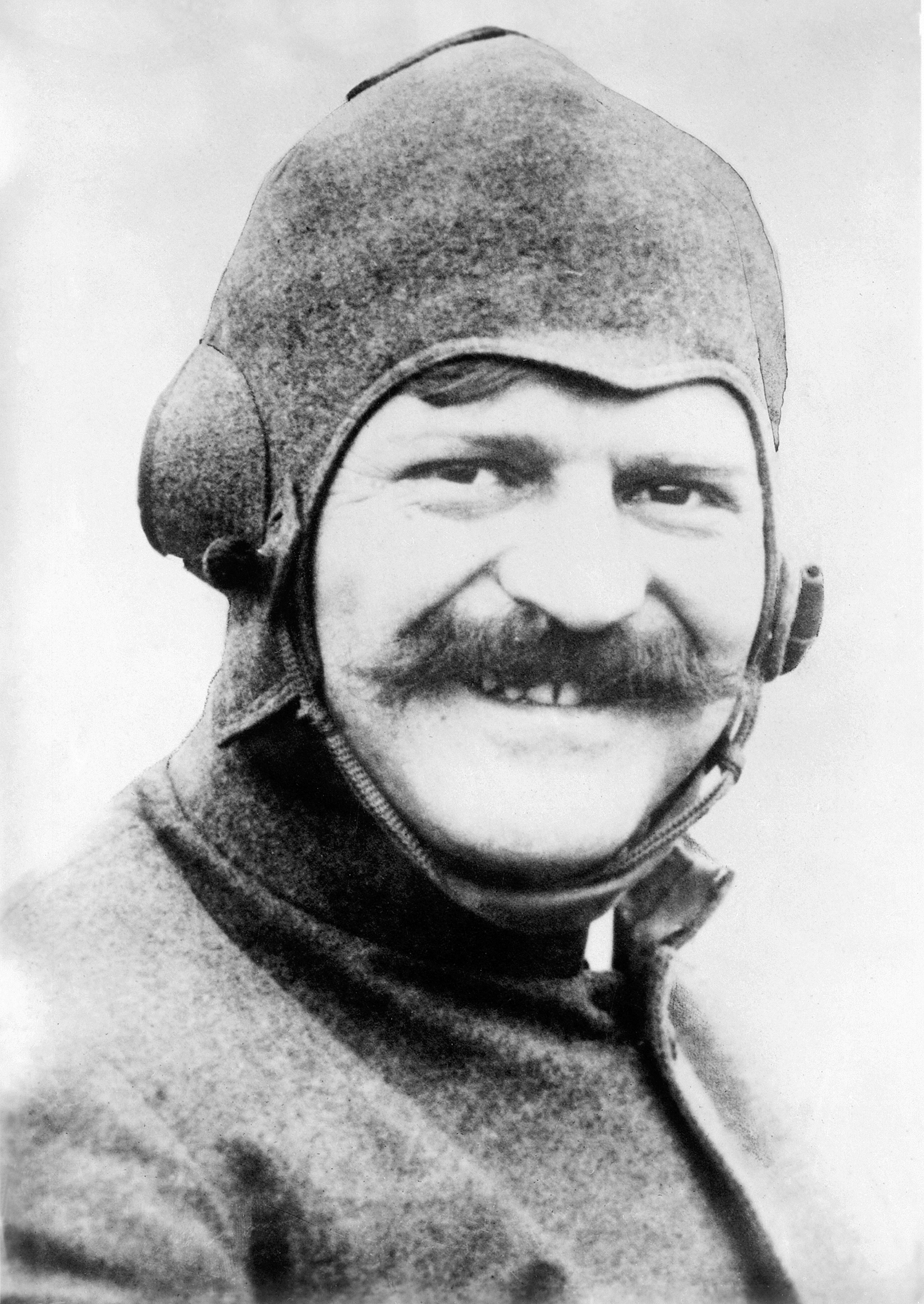
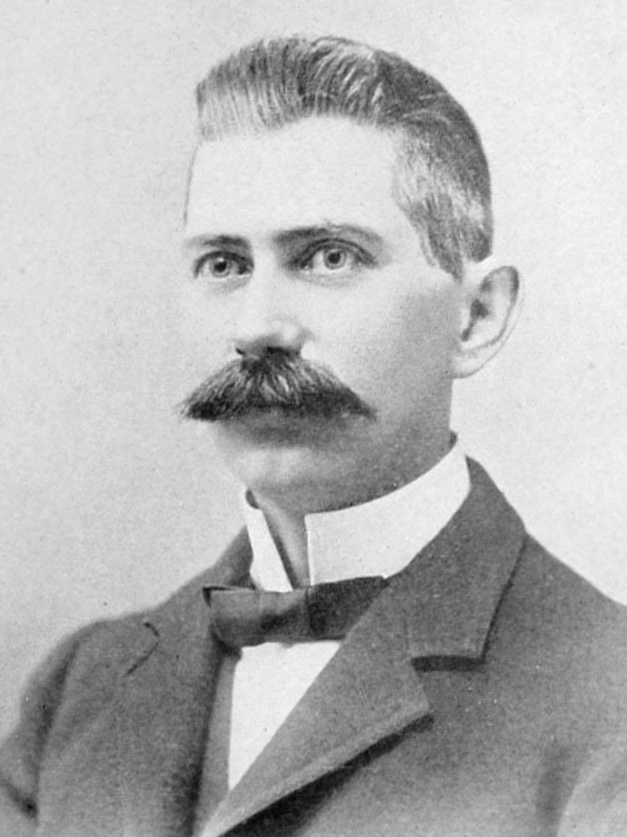
Part of I-69 in Michigan is named for Louis Chevrolet (left) and David Dunbar Buick (right).

In 1980, a Flint-area politician wanted to dedicate a highway after the United Auto Workers (UAW). As a result, the David Dunbar Buick Freeway name was moved off I-475 and applied to I-69 in Flint. The American Association of State Highway and Transportation Officials (AASHTO) approved the extension of the I-69 designation eastward in 1983 so it would terminate at the international boundary at Port Huron; this approval was contingent on construction of the roadway to Interstate Highway standards and other appropriate approvals at the federal government level. The remaining segment of freeway connecting Lapeer with Wadhams opened in 1984 as I-69 and several additional changes were made to the highway system at the same time. M-21 was shortened to Flint and replaced M-56 through the city. The former route of M-21 in Port Huron became BL I-69, and the remainder of that highway was turned back to local control. The I-69 designation was officially extended once more under Congressional legislation on February 10, 1987; this last extension designated I-69 all the way to I-94 in Port Huron to reflect the 1984 openings.

Another segment of freeway opened in 1987 in Clinton County between US 127 near DeWitt and Temp. I-69 near Bath. This section was connected to the existing freeway at Perry in 1991. The final segment of I-69 to be completed was located southwest of Lansing. It opened on October 17, 1992, when the ribbon was cut by Governor John Engler. This segment marked the last in the state to complete Michigan's portion of the Interstate Highway System. At the time it was completed, I-69 was concurrent with US 27 from the state line north to the DeWitt area (exit 87) and then concurrent with US 127 to exit 89 before running alone to Port Huron.

=== Since completion ===
A second span of the Blue Water Bridge between Port Huron and Point Edward opened in July 1997. The St. Johns Bypass on US 27 opened on August 31, 1998; US 27 was extended along I-69 about two miles (3.2 km) to the connect to the bypass, and US 127 was simultaneously removed from I-69. The next year, MDOT petitioned AASHTO to decommission the US 27 designation in the state; the change was approved on April 16, 1999. The state waited until 2002 to make the change.

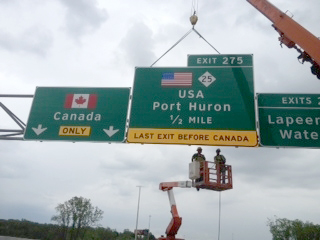
New signage with Canadian and American flags being erected in 2013 to reflect a reconfigured interchange near the Blue Water Bridge in Port Huron

On July 23, 2001, the Michigan Legislature declared that I-69 from exit 105 in Shiawassee County east to exit 135 in Genesee County would be named the Pearl Harbor Memorial Highway. In October 2001, the legislature consolidated the various legislation that created memorial highway designations in the state. Public Act 142 of 2001 extended the merged Chevrolet–Buick Freeway name to all of I-69 in Genesee County, and restored the David Dunbar Buick Freeway name to I-475. The I-69 Recreational Heritage Route (now a Pure Michigan Byway) was created on October 8, 2004, to follow the freeway in Branch and Calhoun counties. The Branch County segment was also dedicated as the Purple Heart Trail on July 17, 2006.

In 2011, construction began to widen I-94/I-69 approaching the Blue Water Bridge, a project completed in 2012. The widening project added dedicated lanes for local traffic and for Blue Water Bridge traffic with a new permanent welcome center opened in 2015, replacing the temporary one near Capac. The lane configuration changes have confused drivers in the area, especially those with outdated GPS devices, a problem first noted as the department was preparing to reopen the freeway in October 2012. As a result, MDOT installed updated signs complete with American and Canadian flags to help prevent drivers from heading to Canada by mistake.

In late 2013, construction began to reconstruct and reconfigure the I-94/I-69 interchange near Port Huron. The project will improve 3.7 miles (6.0 km) of freeway, replace several bridges and ramps and cost $76 million. In June 2014, MDOT closed the ramps from I-69 eastbound to BL I-69 through the interchange until later in the year. The project was completed in September 2015.

== Exit list ==
County	Location	mi	km	Exit	Destinations	Notes
Branch	Kinderhook Township	0.000	0.000		I-69 south – Fort Wayne	Indiana state line
Branch	Kinderhook Township	2.617	4.212	3	Copeland Road – Kinderhook	
Branch	Ovid–Coldwater township line	9.701	15.612	10	BL I-69 north (Fenn Road) – Coldwater	Southern terminus of BL I-69; signed as Fenn Road only southbound
Branch	Coldwater	12.607	20.289	13	BL I-69 south / US 12 – Quincy, Coldwater	Northern terminus of BL I-69; signed as US 12 only northbound
Branch	Coldwater–Girard township line	16.024	25.788	16	Jonesville Road	
Calhoun	Tekonsha Township	22.546	36.284	23	Tekonsha, Girard	Exit for Old US 27 which follows Main Street in Tekonsha and Marshall Road in Branch County; signed as Tekonsha northbound and Girard southbound
Calhoun	Tekonsha Township	24.627	39.633	25	M-60 – Three Rivers, Jackson	
Calhoun	Fredonia Township	31.532	50.746	32	M-227 north (F Drive South)	Southern terminus of M-227
Calhoun	Marshall	36.207– 36.217	58.270– 58.286	36	BL I-94 east (Michigan Avenue) – Marshall M-96 west (Michigan Avenue)	Southern end of BL I-94 concurrency; eastern terminus of M-96
Calhoun	Marshall Township	38.132– 38.150	61.368– 61.396	38	I-94 – Detroit, Chicago BL I-94 east	Northern end of BL I-94 concurrency; exit 108 on I-94
Calhoun	Convis Township	41.896	67.425	42	N Drive North	
Eaton	Walton Township	48.229	77.617	48	M-78 west – Bellevue, Olivet	Eastern terminus of M-78
Eaton	Walton Township	50.406	81.121	51	Ainger Road – Olivet	
Eaton	Carmel–Eaton township line	56.676	91.211	57	BL I-69 north (Cochran Road) – Charlotte	Southern terminus of BL I-69; signed as Cochran Road only southbound
Eaton	Charlotte	59.549	95.835	60	M-50 – Charlotte, Eaton Rapids	
Eaton	Charlotte	61.108	98.344	61	BL I-69 south (Lansing Road) – Charlotte	Northern terminus of BL I-69; signed as Lansing Road only northbound
Eaton	Potterville	66.388	106.841	66	M-100 north – Potterville, Grand Ledge	Southern terminus of M-100
Eaton	Windsor Township	70.270	113.089	70	Lansing Road	
Eaton	Delta Charter Township	72.720– 72.743	117.031– 117.069	72	I-96 east – Detroit	Southern end of I-96 concurrency; concurrency uses I-96 exit numbers; signed as exit 97 southbound
Eaton	Delta Charter Township	74.877	120.503	95	I-496 east – Downtown Lansing	Western terminus of I-496
Eaton	Delta Charter Township	76.341	122.859	93	BL I-69 east / M-43 (Saginaw Highway) – Grand Ledge	Signed as exits 93B (east) and 93A (west); western terminus of BL I-69; signed as M-43 only southbound
Clinton	Watertown Township	78.653– 80.292	126.580– 129.217	91	I-96 west – Grand Rapids	Northern end of I-96 concurrency; I-69 changes from north–south to east–west; signed on I-69 westbound as exit 81 with access to and eastbound entrance from Frances Road
Clinton	DeWitt Township	83.081	133.706	84	Airport Road	
Clinton	DeWitt Township	84.820	136.505	85	DeWitt	Exit located at DeWitt Road
Clinton	DeWitt Township	86.315	138.911	87	Old US 27	
Clinton	DeWitt Township	88.227– 88.256	141.988– 142.034	89	US 127 – East Lansing, Lansing, Jackson, Clare	Signed as exits 89A (south) and 89B (north); exit 82 on US 127
Clinton	Bath Township	91.603	147.421	92	Webster Road – Bath	
Clinton	Bath Township	93.929	151.164	94	BL I-69 west – East Lansing, Haslett, Okemos	Eastern terminus of BL I-69; East Lansing signed westbound only, Haslett and Okemos signed eastbound only
Shiawassee	Woodhull Township	97.319	156.620	98	Woodbury Road – Laingsburg	
Shiawassee	Perry Township	104.613	168.358	105	M-52 – Owosso, Perry	
Shiawassee	Shiawassee Township	112.256	180.659	113	Grand River Road – Bancroft	
Shiawassee	Vernon Township	117.408	188.950	118	M-71 west – Durand, Corunna	Eastern terminus of M-71
Shiawassee–Genesee county line	Venice–Clayton township line	122.213	196.683	123	M-13 north – Lennon, Saginaw	Southern terminus of M-13
Genesee	Swartz Creek	127.186	204.686	128	Morrish Road	
Genesee	Swartz Creek	128.343	206.548	129	Miller Road	
Genesee	Flint	130.649	210.259	131	Bristol Road – Bishop International Airport	Former M-121
Genesee	Flint Township	132.466– 132.479	213.183– 213.204	133	I-75 / US 23 – Saginaw, Ann Arbor, Detroit	Exit 117 on I-75/US 23
Genesee	Flint	134.156	215.903	135	Hammerberg Road	
Genesee	Flint	135.556	218.156	136	Saginaw Street – Downtown	Eastbound exit, entrance via 9th Street; westbound exit, entrance via 8th Street
Genesee	Flint	135.789– 135.812	218.531– 218.568	137	I-475 – Saginaw, Detroit	Exit 6 on I-475
Genesee	Flint	137.085	220.617	138	M-54 (Dort Highway)	
Genesee	Burton	138.087	222.229	139	Center Road	
Genesee	Burton	140.157	225.561	141	Belsay Road	
Genesee	Davison Township	142.216	228.874	143	Irish Road	
Genesee	Davison Township	144.258	232.161	145	M-15 – Clarkston, Davison	
Lapeer	Elba Township	148.232	238.556	149	Elba Road	
Lapeer	Lapeer Township	152.386	245.241	153	Lake Nepessing Road	
Lapeer	Lapeer	154.456	248.573	155	M-24 – Lapeer, Pontiac	
Lapeer	Lapeer Township	158.730	255.451	159	Wilder Road	
Lapeer	Attica Township	162.736	261.898	163	Lake Pleasant Road	
Lapeer	Imlay City	167.815	270.072	168	M-53 – Imlay City, Almont	
St. Clair	Mussey Township	175.231	282.007	176	Capac Road – Capac	
St. Clair	Riley Township	179.647	289.114	180	Riley Center Road	
St. Clair	Riley Township	183.695	295.628	184	M-19 – Sandusky, Richmond	
St. Clair	Wales Township	188.125	302.758	189	Wales Center Road	
St. Clair	Kimball Township	193.383	311.220	194	Taylor Road	
St. Clair	Kimball Township	195.676	314.910	196	Wadhams Road – Wadhams	
St. Clair	Port Huron Township	198.472– 198.497	319.410– 319.450	198	I-94 west – Detroit	Western end of I-94 concurrency; exit 271 on I-94
St. Clair	Port Huron Township	198.448	319.371	199	BL I-69 east – Downtown Port Huron	Eastbound exit from I-69 and I-94 (exit 271); westbound entrance to I-69 and I-94; I-69 begins using I-94's mileposts for exit numbers; western terminus of BL I-69
St. Clair	Port Huron Township	200.745	323.068	274	Water Street, Lapeer Avenue – Port Huron	Signed as 274A (Lapeer Avenue) and 274B (Water Street) eastbound; indirect access to Lapeer Avenue via Lapeer Connector (former M-146); no direct eastbound entrance to Blue Water Bridge
St. Clair	Port Huron	201.301	323.963	275	M-25 north / LHCT – Lexington BL I-69 west / BL I-94 west – Downtown Port Huron	Western end of LHCT concurrency; eastbound last exit before Canada; eastern terminus of BL I-69/BL I-94; southern terminus of M-25; signs eastbound omit BL I-69/BL I-94 and Lexington; no exit number westbound
St. Clair	Port Huron	201.689	324.587	Toll Plaza (eastbound); US Customs (westbound)		
St. Clair River; Canadian border		201.223– 202.317	323.837– 325.598	Blue Water Bridge (tolled)		
St. Clair River; Canadian border		201.223– 202.317	323.837– 325.598		Highway 402 east / LHCT – Sarnia, London	Continuation into Ontario
1.000 mi = 1.609 km; 1.000 km = 0.621 mi: Concurrency terminus; Incomplete access; Tolled

== Business loops ==
In Michigan, I-69 currently has four business loops. These highways, each designated Business Loop I-69 (BL I-69), provide access from the main freeway through the downtown districts of adjacent cities. They follow former routings used by I-69's predecessor highways (US 27, M-78 and M-21) as well as connecting roads. The cities served by these loops are: Coldwater, Charlotte, Lansing, and Port Huron.

== Notes ==
Interstate 69
Previous state: Indiana	Michigan	Next state: Terminus
