= Jesse M. Hatch =

American politician

Member of the Michigan House of Representatives from the Calhoun County 1st district
- In office January 1, 1909 – December 31, 1910

Personal details
- Born: May 27, 1858 Lee Center, Michigan, US
- Died: February 20, 1940 (aged 81) Marshall, Michigan, US
- Party: Republican
- Spouse: Ella Melissa
- Education: University of Michigan Law School

Jesse Monroe Hatch (May 27, 1858 – February 20, 1940) was a Michigan politician.

== Early life ==
Hatch was born in the Lee Center in Lee Township, Michigan on May 27, 1858, to parents James W. and Juliette Hatch. Hatch graduated from the University of Michigan Law School.

== Career ==
Hatch served as the Calhoun County prosecuting attorney from 1901 to 1902. Hatch then served as a member of the Michigan House of Representatives from the Calhoun County 1st district from 1909 to 1910. Hatch was a Republican.

== Personal life ==
Hatch married Ella Melissa Willard on October 7, 1885. Together they had at least nine children, including Blaine W. Hatch and Hazen J. Hatch. Hatch was widowed on November 14, 1937.

== Death ==
Hatch died on February 20, 1940, in Marshall, Michigan. He was interred at Oakridge Cemetery in Marshall on February 22, 1940.
