= Tekonsha =

Tekonsha may refer to:

- Tekonsha Township, Michigan
- Tekonsha, Michigan, a village
