= M-311 (Michigan highway) =

State highway in Calhoun County, Michigan, United States

M-311
- 11 Mile Road
- M-311 highlighted in red

Route information
- Maintained by MDOT
- Length: 13.718 mi (22.077 km)
- Existed: October 1, 1998–present

Major junctions
- South end: M-60 in Burlington
- North end: I-94 near Battle Creek

Location
- Country: United States
- State: Michigan
- Counties: Calhoun

Highway system
- Michigan State Trunkline Highway System; Interstate; US; State; Byways
← I-296	→ M-331

M-311 is a 13.7-mile-long (22.0 km) state trunkline highway in Calhoun County in the US state of Michigan that runs from the intersection of M-60 in Burlington north to Interstate 94 (I-94) at exit 104 in Emmett Township. It was previously an unsigned state trunkline, meaning that no reassurance markers were used to identify the highway. The route mainly consists of 11 Mile Road, which was a county road prior to the 1998 rationalization process.

== Route description ==
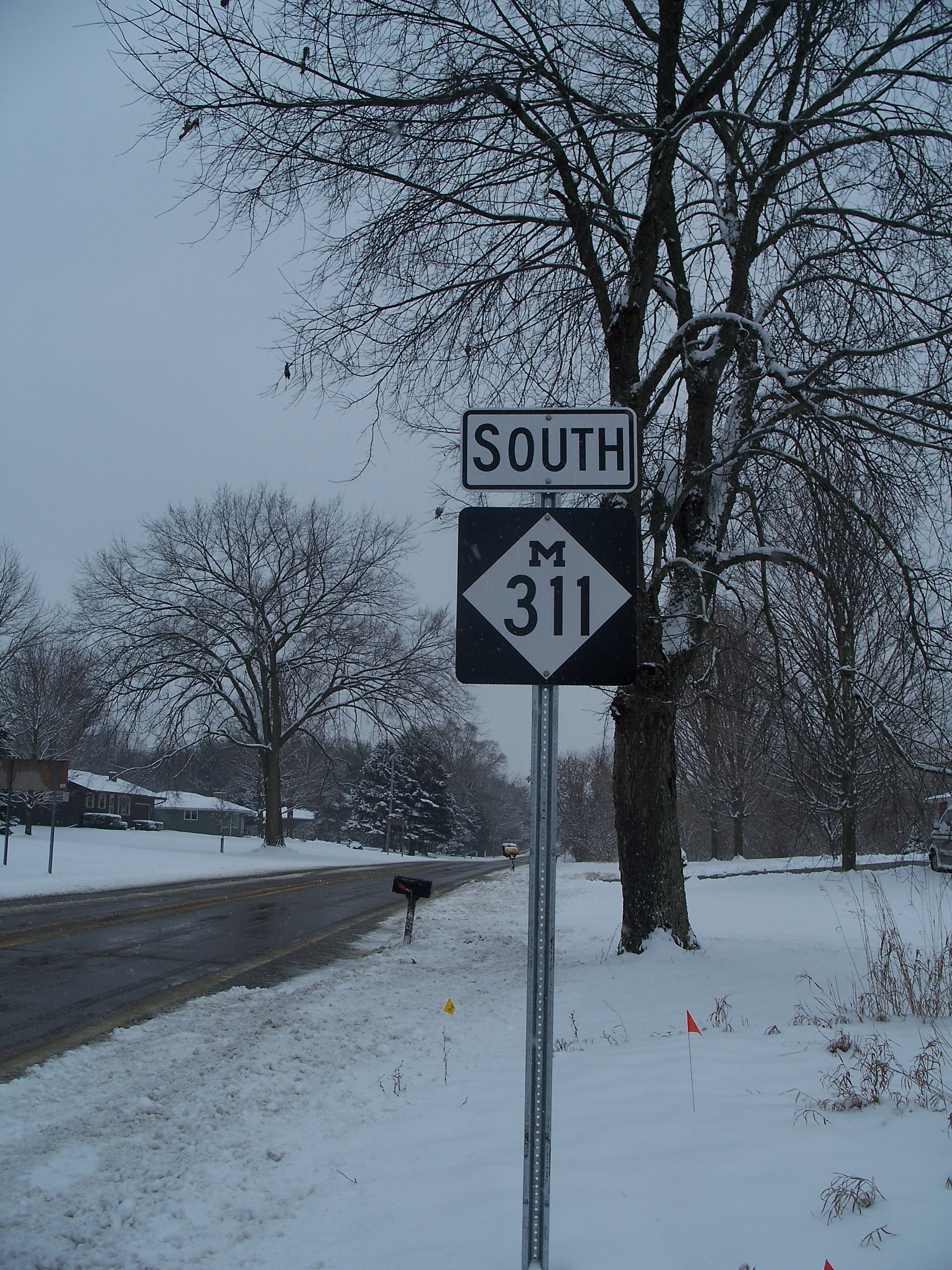
M-311 sign along the highway in December 2009

M-311 follows 11 Mile Road between M-60 and I-94. In the village of Burlington, M-311 is known as Marshall Street. There is a jog in 11 Mile Road as it runs northwesterly between Q Drive and O Drive. At N Drive, M-311/11 Mile Road turns along N Drive a short distance before turning back northward. Near D Drive, 11 Mile Road passes Hyde Lake. M-311 crosses the Kalamazoo River just south of I-94. All of M-311 is two-lane, rural highway in forest lands and farm fields, and none of it is listed on the National Highway System.

== History ==
M-311 was created on October 1, 1998, as a part of Governor John Engler's Rationalization process. The original routing started at BL I-94/Michigan Avenue and Raymond Avenue. It followed Raymond Avenue to Emmet Street before turning east to Cooper Avenue. From Cooper Avenue, M-311 turned east again on N Drive North until meeting 11 Mile Road. There it followed 11 Mile Road south to M-60 in Burlington. Since the original transfer, all of M-311 north of I-94 was returned to Calhoun County control. This eliminated the section that made a "U-turn". Since December 2009, the highway has been signed in the field.

== Major intersections ==
The entire highway is in Calhoun County.

Location	mi	km	Destinations	Notes
Burlington	0.000	0.000	M-60 (Leroy Street)	
Emmett Charter Township	13.600	21.887	M-96 (Michigan Avenue)	
Emmett Charter Township	13.718	22.077	I-94 – Detroit, Chicago	Exit 104 on I-94
1.000 mi = 1.609 km; 1.000 km = 0.621 mi
