= Midway Airport (Michigan) =

- IATA: none; ICAO: none; FAA LID: 42MI

Summary
- Airport type: Private
- Operator: G. Johnson & P. Weitzel
- Location: Babcock, Michigan
- Elevation AMSL: 963 ft / 293.5 m
- Coordinates: 42°12′55.15″N 84°48′24.9″W

Map

Runways
Direction	Length		Surface
Direction	ft	m	Surface
9/27	2,260	689	Turf

Midway Airport (FAA LID: 42MI) is a small, privately owned airfield in Babcock, Michigan, located approximately two miles (3 km) southwest of the city of Albion in Calhoun County.

== Facilities ==
Midway Airport covers 9 acres (3.6 ha) and has one runway. It is designated as runway 9/27, and it measures 2,260 ft × 100 ft (689 m × 30 m). It's made of a turf surface.

== See also ==
- List of airports in Michigan
