= Homer Township, Calhoun County, Michigan =

Homer Township, Michigan
- Township
- Location within the state of Michigan
- Coordinates: 42°7′41″N 84°47′49″W
- Country: United States
- State: Michigan
- County: Calhoun

Area
  - Total: 36.2 sq mi (93.7 km^{2})
  - Land: 35.7 sq mi (92.4 km^{2})
  - Water: 0.50 sq mi (1.3 km^{2})
- Elevation: 991 ft (302 m)

Population (2020)
  - Total: 2,896
  - Density: 81.2/sq mi (31.3/km^{2})
- Time zone: UTC-5 (Eastern (EST))
  - Summer (DST): UTC-4 (EDT)
- ZIP code: 49245
- Area code: 517
- FIPS code: 26-38940
- GNIS feature ID: 1626485
- Website: homertownshipcalhouncounty.gov

Homer Township is a civil township of Calhoun County in the U.S. state of Michigan. It is part of the Battle Creek, Michigan Metropolitan Statistical Area. The population was 2,896 at the 2020 census.

== History ==
=== The first European settlers ===
The first permanent settlers were from Luzerne County, Pennsylvania. Powell Grover, William Wintersteen, Richard McMutrie, and Henry McMurtrie walked from Stroudsburg, Pennsylvania, arriving in the Homer area in April 1832. Powell Grover's group lived their first year in an abandoned log cabin located in Section 11 of present-day Homer Township, said to be the former residence of Potawatomi native Chief Ne-au-to-beer-saw, while the settlers built their own cabins. Grover also built a saw mill on the north bank of the Kalamazoo River in Section 11. The plains where Grover and his friends homesteaded was known as the Pennsylvania Settlement.

Milton Barney arrived from Lyons, New York, the summer of 1832 to scout the area and returned that September with his family and workmen to settle on the south bank of the Kalamazoo River in Section 5. Soon afterwards Barney hired Osha Wilder to layout the plat for the village of Barneyville on the southwest corner of Section 5, southeast corner of Section 6, northeast corner of Section 7, and northwest corner of Section 8. This was the beginning of the village of Homer.

In 1834, the territorial legislature divided the area into townships of 12-mile (19 km) squares 144 square miles (370 km^{2}). The township in lower Calhoun County was named Homer due to the influence of James Hopkins and many other settlers from Homer, Cortland County, New York. This first township was later divided into the townships of Albion, Clarendon, Eckford, and Homer—each 6-mile (10 km) squares.

=== The Native Americans ===
According to Dr William Lane, the Potawatomi natives were friendly, and the children of settlers and natives often played together. Chief Ne-au-to-beer-saw, called "Leather-nose", and Chief Wopkezike, lesser chiefs of the Baw Beese band of Potawatomi, are mentioned in many stories of the founding era. The native population was numerous until the U.S. government forcibly removed the Indians to reserves west of the Mississippi under authority of the Indian Removal Act and 1833 Treaty of Chicago. Because of the peacefulness of the Potawatomi, they continued to co-exist with the settlers for many years after the Removal Act, until the autumn of 1840 when General Hugh Brady removed about 250 Indians of Hillsdale County and Homer to Miami County, Kansas, in reaction to homesteader complaints to the Van Buren administration. Chief Ne-au-to-beer-saw drowned while crossing the Detroit River returning from his escape to Canada.

== Communities ==
The village of Homer is within the township. The Homer ZIP code, 49245, serves the entire township as well as portions of Clarendon Township to the west, Eckford Township to the northwest and Albion Township to the north.

== Geography ==
According to the United States Census Bureau, Homer Township has a total area of 36.2 square miles (93.7 km^{2}), of which 35.7 square miles (92.4 km^{2}) is land and 0.50 square miles (1.3 km^{2}), or 1.44%, is water.

== Demographics ==
Historical population
Census	Pop.	Note	%±
1960	2,614		—
1970	2,714		3.8%
1980	3,041		12.0%
1990	2,875		−5.5%
2000	3,010		4.7%
2010	3,015		0.2%
2020	2,896		−3.9%
Source: Census Bureau. Census 1960- 2000, 2010.

As of the census of 2000, there were 3,010 people, 1,117 households, and 797 families residing in the township. The population density was 84.3 inhabitants per square mile (32.5/km^{2}). There were 1,182 housing units at an average density of 33.1 per square mile (12.8/km^{2}). The racial makeup of the township was 97.77% White, 0.20% African American, 0.10% Native American, 0.07% Asian, 0.10% from other races, and 1.76% from two or more races. Hispanic or Latino of any race were 1.69% of the population.

There were 1,117 households, out of which 37.6% had children under the age of 18 living with them, 52.9% were married couples living together, 12.1% had a female householder with no husband present, and 28.6% were non-families. 24.2% of all households were made up of individuals, and 11.5% had someone living alone who was 65 years of age or older. The average household size was 2.68 and the average family size was 3.18.

In the township the population was spread out, with 30.1% under the age of 18, 8.8% from 18 to 24, 28.2% from 25 to 44, 22.3% from 45 to 64, and 10.7% who were 65 years of age or older. The median age was 33 years. For every 100 females, there were 95.5 males. For every 100 females age 18 and over, there were 94.4 males.

The median income for a household in the township was $36,250, and the median income for a family was $42,159. Males had a median income of $31,649 versus $22,788 for females. The per capita income for the township was $16,686. About 9.5% of families and 14.6% of the population were below the poverty line, including 19.2% of those under age 18 and 17.4% of those age 65 or over.
