= Homer, Michigan =

- Village
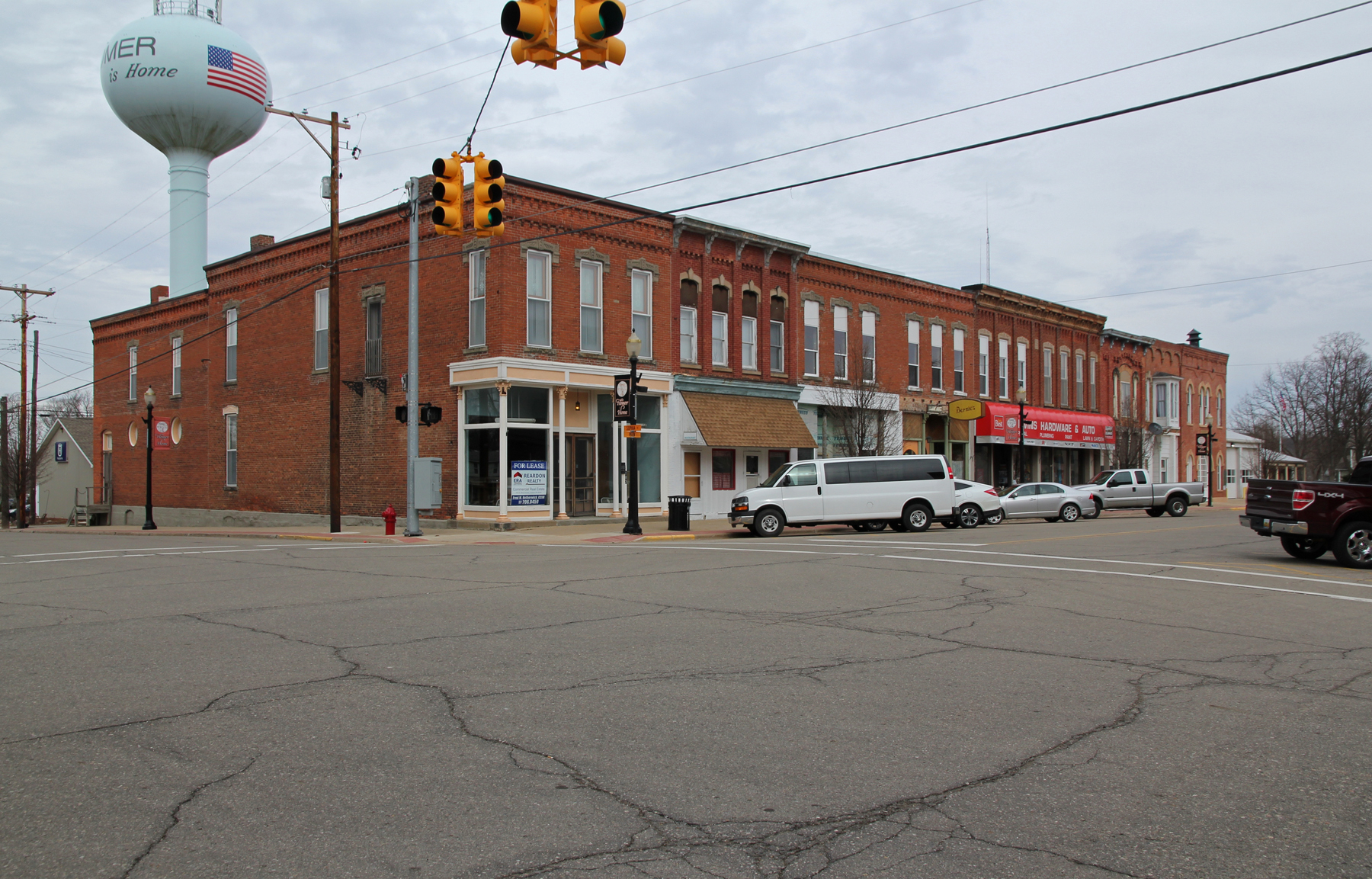
- Motto: "Homer is home"
- Location of Homer, Michigan
- Coordinates: 42°8′39″N 84°48′23″W
- Country: United States
- State: Michigan
- County: Calhoun
- Township: Homer

Area
  - Total: 1.44 sq mi (3.74 km^{2})
  - Land: 1.39 sq mi (3.61 km^{2})
  - Water: 0.046 sq mi (0.12 km^{2})
- Elevation: 991 ft (302 m)

Population (2020)
  - Total: 1,575
  - Density: 1,128.7/sq mi (435.81/km^{2})
- Time zone: UTC-5 (Eastern (EST))
  - Summer (DST): UTC-4 (EDT)
- ZIP code: 49245
- Area code: 517
- FIPS code: 26-38920
- GNIS feature ID: 0628509
- Website: homermichigan.org

Homer is a village in Calhoun County in the U.S. state of Michigan. It is part of the Battle Creek, Michigan Metropolitan Statistical Area. The population was 1,575 at the 2020 census.

== History ==
Milton Barney arrived from Lyons, New York the summer of 1832 to scout the area and returned that September with his family and workmen to settle on the south bank of the Kalamazoo River in Section 5. Soon after Barney hired Osha Wilder to layout the plat for the village of Barneyville on the SW corner of Section 5, SE corner of Section 6, NE corner of Section 7, and NW corner of Section 8. For more a detailed history of the surrounding area see the entry for Homer Township and Clarendon Township.

Milton Barney built a store, a sawmill, and a hotel. In 1834 when a post office was registered, Barneyville was renamed Homer after the village in Cortland County, New York, at the request of many of the residents who had moved from there. Homer was incorporated as a village in 1871.

According to Dr William Lane, the Potawatomi natives were friendly and the children of settlers and natives often played together. Chief Ne-au-to-beer-saw, called Leather-nose, and Chief Wopkezike are mentioned in many stories of the founding era. The native population was numerous until the autumn of 1840 when the U.S. Government forcibly removed the Indians to reserves west of the Mississippi under Authority of the Indian Removal Act and 1833 Treaty of Chicago. Because of the peacefulness of the Potawatomi, they continued to co-exist with the settlers many years after the Treaty of Chicago until General Brady removed about 250 Indians of Hillsdale and Homer to Miami County, KS. Chief Ne-au-to-beer-saw drowned while crossing the Detroit River returning from his escape to Canada.

The "old" Homer mills was built by a stock company of Milton Barney, Walter Wright, Nelson D. Skeeles, Asabel Finch, Jr, and Mr Platt in 1837–1838. This structure was later operated under the name Smith, Lewis, & Redfield. The property passed on to B. & E.R. Smith in 1860 and to Judge Emons of Detroit in 1872. This original structure burned on January 25, 1886. The heirs of Judge Emons sold the water power, land, and mill site to Cortright & Sons.

The Homer High School varsity baseball team set the national record for most consecutive wins at 75. The streak started at the start of the 2004 season and ended in the state championship game in 2005. From 2003 to 2006 the varsity baseball team compiled a 143–6 record. Winning two state championships, in 2004 and 2006, and was televised on ESPN's 50 States in 50 Days segment on the state of Michigan.

In the early morning of May 16, 2010, the "new" Homer mills, a local landmark, burned to the ground. The fire is estimated to be the biggest fire in the town's history since the high school burned down in 1943. The fire was so intense that the Homer Fire Department requested and received the aid of the fire departments of Albion, Albion Township, Sheridan Township, Marengo Township, Fredonia Township, Litchfield, and Concord. Fire trucks had to patrol the town, as ashes were raining down and posed the threat of setting houses on fire. The cause of the fire is unknown.

== Education ==
The Homer Community Schools District serves Homer and Homer Township, Michigan. The district also receives a large number of students from surrounding villages & towns, who take advantage of Michigan's school of choice.

== Geography ==
According to the United States Census Bureau, the village has a total area of 1.45 square miles (3.76 km^{2}), 1.40 square miles (3.63 km^{2}) of which is land and 0.05 square miles (0.13 km^{2}) is water.

== Demographics ==
Historical population
Census	Pop.	Note	%±
1870	685		—
1880	893		30.4%
1890	1,063		19.0%
1900	1,097		3.2%
1910	1,008		−8.1%
1920	1,076		6.7%
1930	1,108		3.0%
1940	1,145		3.3%
1950	1,301		13.6%
1960	1,629		25.2%
1970	1,617		−0.7%
1980	1,791		10.8%
1990	1,758		−1.8%
2000	1,851		5.3%
2010	1,668		−9.9%
2020	1,575		−5.6%
Source: Census Bureau. Census 1960– 2000, 2010.

=== 2020 census ===
As of the 2020 census, Homer had a population of 1,575. The median age was 36.5 years. 27.4% of residents were under the age of 18 and 15.0% of residents were 65 years of age or older. For every 100 females there were 94.2 males, and for every 100 females age 18 and over there were 92.6 males age 18 and over.

0.0% of residents lived in urban areas, while 100.0% lived in rural areas.

There were 636 households in Homer, of which 34.1% had children under the age of 18 living in them. Of all households, 42.9% were married-couple households, 18.7% were households with a male householder and no spouse or partner present, and 29.1% were households with a female householder and no spouse or partner present. About 30.3% of all households were made up of individuals and 12.7% had someone living alone who was 65 years of age or older.

There were 695 housing units, of which 8.5% were vacant. The homeowner vacancy rate was 2.5% and the rental vacancy rate was 8.5%.

Racial composition as of the 2020 census
Race	Number	Percent
White	1,487	94.4%
Black or African American	9	0.6%
American Indian and Alaska Native	4	0.3%
Asian	0	0.0%
Native Hawaiian and Other Pacific Islander	0	0.0%
Some other race	5	0.3%
Two or more races	70	4.4%
Hispanic or Latino (of any race)	42	2.7%

=== 2010 census ===
As of the census of 2010, there were 1,668 people, 615 households, and 435 families residing in the village. The population density was 1,191.4 inhabitants per square mile (460.0/km^{2}). There were 722 housing units at an average density of 515.7 per square mile (199.1/km^{2}). The racial makeup of the village was 97.7% White, 0.3% African American, 0.4% Native American, 0.4% Asian, 0.5% from other races, and 0.7% from two or more races. Hispanic or Latino of any race were 2.8% of the population.

There were 615 households, of which 41.3% had children under the age of 18 living with them, 48.0% were married couples living together, 16.3% had a female householder with no husband present, 6.5% had a male householder with no wife present, and 29.3% were non-families. 23.9% of all households were made up of individuals, and 10.1% had someone living alone who was 65 years of age or older. The average household size was 2.71 and the average family size was 3.12.

The median age in the village was 33.5 years. 30.3% of residents were under the age of 18; 8.9% were between the ages of 18 and 24; 25.6% were from 25 to 44; 22.9% were from 45 to 64; and 12.4% were 65 years of age or older. The gender makeup of the village was 48.6% male and 51.4% female.

=== 2000 census ===
As of the census of 2000, there were 1,851 people, 707 households, and 477 families residing in the village. The population density was 1,300.6 inhabitants per square mile (502.2/km^{2}). There were 745 housing units at an average density of 523.5 per square mile (202.1/km^{2}). The racial makeup of the village was 97.24% White, 0.27% African American, 0.16% Native American, 0.11% Asian, 0.16% from other races, and 2.05% from two or more races. Hispanic or Latino of any race were 2.16% of the population.

There were 707 households, out of which 39.3% had children under the age of 18 living with them, 45.5% were married couples living together, 15.3% had a female householder with no husband present, and 32.5% were non-families. 28.0% of all households were made up of individuals, and 12.3% had someone living alone who was 65 years of age or older. The average household size was 2.61 and the average family size was 3.16.

In the village, the population was spread out, with 31.3% under the age of 18, 9.7% from 18 to 24, 28.7% from 25 to 44, 19.9% from 45 to 64, and 10.3% who were 65 years of age or older. The median age was 31 years. For every 100 females, there were 96.1 males. For every 100 females age 18 and over, there were 91.1 males.

The median income for a household in the village was $35,542, and the median income for a family was $41,125. Males had a median income of $31,214 versus $22,829 for females. The per capita income for the village was $16,394. About 9.6% of families and 11.5% of the population were below the poverty line, including 10.3% of those under age 18 and 17.1% of those age 65 or over.

== Notable people ==
- Greg Barton, Olympic gold medalist
- Josh Collmenter, Major league baseball player
