= Clarendon Township, Michigan =

- Township
- Location within the state of Michigan
- Coordinates: 42°7′05″N 84°52′00″W
- Country: United States
- State: Michigan
- County: Calhoun
- Established: March 6, 1838
- Named after: Clarendon, New York

Area
  - Total: 35.7 sq mi (92.5 km^{2})
  - Land: 35.5 sq mi (92.0 km^{2})
  - Water: 0.19 sq mi (0.5 km^{2})
- Elevation: 971 ft (296 m)

Population (2020)
  - Total: 1,181
  - Density: 33.2/sq mi (12.8/km^{2})
- Time zone: UTC-5 (Eastern (EST))
  - Summer (DST): UTC-4 (EDT)
- ZIP codes: 49068 (Marshall), 49245 (Homer), 49092 (Tekonsha)
- FIPS code: 26-16020
- GNIS feature ID: 1626087
- Website: https://www.clarendontwp.net/

Clarendon Township is a civil township of Calhoun County in the U.S. state of Michigan. The population was 1,181 at the 2020 census. The township is part of the Battle Creek Metropolitan Statistical Area.

== Communities ==
There are no incorporated municipalities in the mostly agricultural township.

- Bentleys Corners is an unincorporated community at 42°06′08″N 84°52′00″W near the junction of 22 Mile Rd and T Dr. S. This locale at the corners of sections 22, 23, 26 and 27 was originally known as Clarendon Centre. A post office opened on June 14, 1854, with Warren L. Deming as the first postmaster, though under the care of Samuel N. Bently (or Bentley) for much of the time Deming was postmaster. The post office was moved approximately two miles to the north and renamed Clarendon in 1867 (see below).
- Cook's Prairie in the northeastern part of the township and extending into southeast Eckford Township was one of the earliest areas to be settled in the township. The first settler reported to have settled here, Anthony Doolittle, arrived in May 1832 with Deacon Henry Cook. Cook purchased land in what became Eckford Township while Doolittle settled in section 1 of what became Clarendon Township. A post office was established on July 25, 1840, with Lewis Benham as the first postmaster. The office closed on August 24, 1858.
- Clarendon, at 42°07′49″N 84°51′57″W was a station on the Michigan Air Line Railroad of the Michigan Central Railroad, beginning in approximately 1870. The post office at Clarendon Centre was moved to the station and renamed Clarendon on May 11, 1871. The office closed on November 16, 1877, but was restored from October 4, 1883, through April 30, 1910.
- The village of Homer is to the east, and the Homer post office, with ZIP code 49245, serves most of eastern Clarendon Township.
- The village of Tekonsha is to the west, and the Tekonsha post office, with ZIP code 49092, serves the southwest portion of Clarendon Township.
- The city of Marshall is to the northwest, and the Marshall post office, with ZIP code 49068, serves the northwest portion of Clarendon Township.

== Geography ==
According to the United States Census Bureau, the township has a total area of 35.7 square miles (92.5 km^{2}), of which 35.5 square miles (92.0 km^{2}) is land and 0.2 square miles (0.5 km^{2}), or 0.51%, is water.

== Demographics ==
Historical population
Census	Pop.	Note	%±
1960	1,095		—
1970	1,137		3.8%
1980	1,176		3.4%
1990	1,100		−6.5%
2000	1,114		1.3%
2010	1,139		2.2%
2020	1,181		3.7%
Source: Census Bureau. Census 1960- 2000, 2010.

As of the census of 2000, there were 1,114 people, 394 households, and 314 families residing in the township. The population density was 31.3 inhabitants per square mile (12.1/km^{2}). There were 425 housing units at an average density of 11.9 per square mile (4.6/km^{2}). The racial makeup of the township was 97.22% White, 0.09% African American, 1.35% Native American, and 1.35% from two or more races. Hispanic or Latino of any race were 0.54% of the population.

There were 394 households, out of which 35.0% had children under the age of 18 living with them, 64.5% were married couples living together, 9.4% had a female householder with no husband present, and 20.1% were non-families. 16.8% of all households were made up of individuals, and 8.4% had someone living alone who was 65 years of age or older. The average household size was 2.83 and the average family size was 3.10.

In the township the population was spread out, with 28.5% under the age of 18, 7.5% from 18 to 24, 28.2% from 25 to 44, 25.7% from 45 to 64, and 10.1% who were 65 years of age or older. The median age was 36 years. For every 100 females, there were 102.5 males. For every 100 females age 18 and over, there were 104.6 males.

The median income for a household in the township was $44,750, and the median income for a family was $48,661. Males had a median income of $35,435 versus $27,353 for females. The per capita income for the township was $18,247. About 4.7% of families and 8.0% of the population were below the poverty line, including 7.9% of those under age 18 and 5.6% of those age 65 or over.
