= Burlington Township, Calhoun County, Michigan =

Burlington Township, Michigan
- Township
- Location within the state of Michigan
- Coordinates: 42°6′30″N 85°7′15″W
- Country: United States
- State: Michigan
- County: Calhoun

Area
  - Total: 36.1 sq mi (93.6 km^{2})
  - Land: 35.7 sq mi (92.5 km^{2})
  - Water: 0.42 sq mi (1.1 km^{2})
- Elevation: 920 ft (280 m)

Population (2020)
  - Total: 1,957
  - Density: 54.8/sq mi (21.2/km^{2})
- Time zone: UTC-5 (Eastern (EST))
  - Summer (DST): UTC-4 (EDT)
- ZIP code: 49029
- Area code: 517
- FIPS code: 26-11820
- GNIS feature ID: 1626004
- Website: burlingtontownshipcalhouncountymi.com

Burlington Township is a civil township of Calhoun County in the U.S. state of Michigan. It is part of the Battle Creek, Michigan Metropolitan Statistical Area. As of the 2020 census, the township population was 1,957.

== Geography ==
Burlington Township is located in southwestern Calhoun County, with its southern border following the Branch County line. The village of Burlington is in the southeastern part of the township. The village of Union City, located primarily in Union Township in Branch County, extends slightly north into Burlington Township.

According to the United States Census Bureau, the township has a total area of 36.1 square miles (93.6 km^{2}), of which 35.7 square miles (92.5 km^{2}) is land and 0.42 square miles (1.1 km^{2}), or 1.18%, is water. The St. Joseph River flows through the southeastern portion of the township past the villages of Burlington and Union City.

== Demographics ==
Historical population
Census	Pop.	Note	%±
1960	1,455		—
1970	1,528		5.0%
1980	1,909		24.9%
1990	1,773		−7.1%
2000	1,929		8.8%
2010	1,941		0.6%
2020	1,957		0.8%
Source: Census Bureau. Census 1960- 2000, 2010.

As of the census of 2000, there were 1,929 people, 734 households, and 565 families residing in the township. The population density was 53.8 inhabitants per square mile (20.8/km^{2}). There were 775 housing units at an average density of 21.6 per square mile (8.3/km^{2}). The racial makeup of the township was 98.03% White, 0.10% African American, 0.57% Native American, 0.21% Asian, 0.16% Pacific Islander, 0.16% from other races, and 0.78% from two or more races. Hispanic or Latino of any race were 0.98% of the population.

There were 734 households, out of which 32.2% had children under the age of 18 living with them, 62.3% were married couples living together, 9.9% had a female householder with no husband present, and 23.0% were non-families. 18.4% of all households were made up of individuals, and 7.4% had someone living alone who was 65 years of age or older. The average household size was 2.63 and the average family size was 2.94.

In the township the population was spread out, with 24.8% under the age of 18, 8.5% from 18 to 24, 28.7% from 25 to 44, 24.7% from 45 to 64, and 13.4% who were 65 years of age or older. The median age was 38 years. For every 100 females, there were 99.5 males. For every 100 females age 18 and over, there were 101.8 males.

The median income for a household in the township was $42,778, and the median income for a family was $45,500. Males had a median income of $34,917 versus $26,823 for females. The per capita income for the township was $20,960. About 7.3% of families and 12.1% of the population were below the poverty line, including 23.9% of those under age 18 and 7.5% of those age 65 or over.
