= Calhoun County, Michigan =

County in Michigan, United States

- County
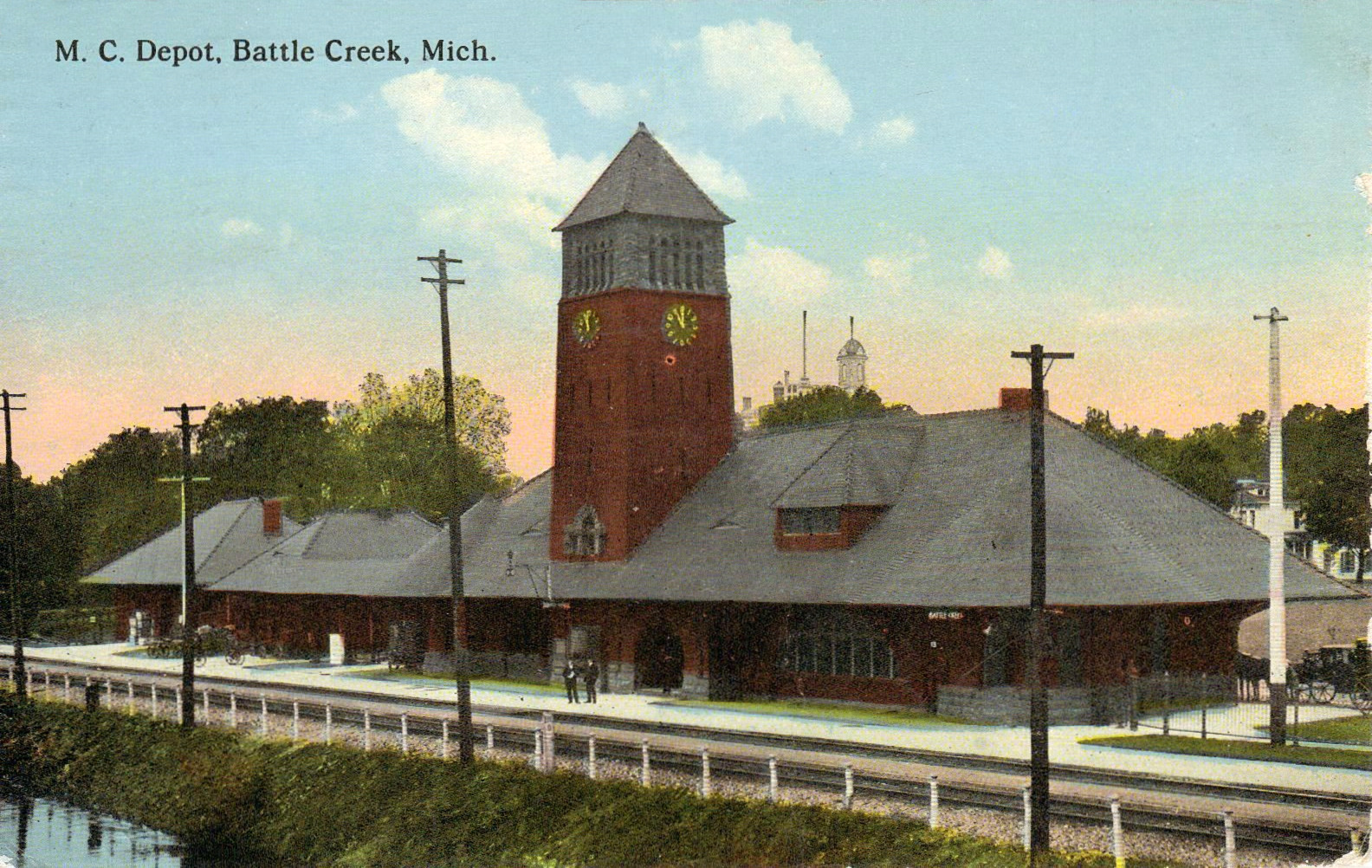
- Post Card. Michigan Central Depot in Battle Creek.

- Location within the U.S. state of Michigan
- Coordinates: 42°15′N 85°00′W
- Country: United States
- State: Michigan
- Founded: established 1829 organized 1833
- Named for: John C. Calhoun
- Seat: Marshall
- Largest city: Battle Creek

Area
  - Total: 718 sq mi (1,860 km^{2})
  - Land: 706 sq mi (1,830 km^{2})
  - Water: 12 sq mi (31 km^{2}) 1.7%

Population (2020)
  - Total: 134,310
  - Estimate (2025): 133,408 ▼
  - Density: 190/sq mi (73.5/km^{2})
- Congressional districts: 4th, 5th
- Website: www.calhouncountymi.gov

Calhoun County is a county in the U.S. state of Michigan. As of the 2020 Census, the population was 134,310. The county seat is Marshall. The county was established on October 19, 1829, and named after John C. Calhoun, who was at the time Vice President under Andrew Jackson, making it one of Michigan's Cabinet counties. County government was first organized on March 6, 1833. Calhoun County comprises the Battle Creek Metropolitan Statistical Area and is included in the Kalamazoo-Battle Creek-Portage Combined Statistical Area.

== Geography ==
According to the U.S. Census Bureau, the county has a total area of 718 square miles (1,860 km^{2}), of which 706 square miles (1,830 km^{2}) is land and 12 square miles (31 km^{2}) (1.7%) is water.

=== Geographic features ===
- Kalamazoo River
- Battle Creek River
- St. Joseph River (Lake Michigan)
- Goguac Lake
- Lyon Lake

=== Adjacent counties ===
- Eaton County - north
- Barry County - northwest
- Jackson County - east
- Kalamazoo County - west
- Hillsdale County - southeast
- Branch County - south
- St. Joseph County - southwest

== Transportation ==
=== Major highways ===
- I-69
- I-94
- I-194
- BL I-94 serves the city of Albion.
- BL I-94 serves the city of Battle Creek.
- BL I-94 serves the city of Marshall.
- M-37
- M-60
- M-66
- M-78
- M-89
- M-96
- M-99
- M-199
- M-227
- M-294
- M-311

== History ==
The Kalamazoo River oil spill occurred in July 2010 when a pipeline operated by Enbridge (Line 6B) burst and flowed into Talmadge Creek, a tributary of the Kalamazoo River. A six-foot break in the pipeline resulted in the largest inland oil spill, and one of the costliest spills in U.S. history. The pipeline carries diluted bitumen (dilbit), a heavy crude oil from Canada's Athabasca oil sands to the United States. Following the spill, the volatile hydrocarbon diluents evaporated, leaving the heavier bitumen to sink in the water column. Thirty-five miles of the Kalamazoo River were closed for clean-up until June 2012, when portions of the river were re-opened. On March 14, 2013, the Environmental Protection Agency (EPA) ordered Enbridge to return to dredge portions of the river to remove submerged oil and oil-contaminated sediment.

== Demographics ==
Historical population
Census	Pop.	Note	%±
1840	10,599		—
1850	19,162		80.8%
1860	29,564		54.3%
1870	36,569		23.7%
1880	38,452		5.1%
1890	43,501		13.1%
1900	49,315		13.4%
1910	56,638		14.8%
1920	72,918		28.7%
1930	87,043		19.4%
1940	94,206		8.2%
1950	120,813		28.2%
1960	138,858		14.9%
1970	141,963		2.2%
1980	141,557		−0.3%
1990	135,982		−3.9%
2000	137,985		1.5%
2010	136,146		−1.3%
2020	134,310		−1.3%
2025 (est.)	133,408	▼	−0.7%
U.S. Decennial Census; 1790-1960 1900-1990; 1990-2000 2010-2019

=== Racial and ethnic composition ===
Calhoun County, Michigan – Racial and ethnic composition Note: the US Census treats Hispanic/Latino as an ethnic category. This table excludes Latinos from the racial categories and assigns them to a separate category. Hispanics/Latinos may be of any race.
Race / Ethnicity (NH = Non-Hispanic)	Pop 1980	Pop 1990	Pop 2000	Pop 2010	Pop 2020	% 1980	% 1990	% 2000	% 2010	% 2020
White alone (NH)	124,353	117,299	113,723	108,664	100,385	87.85%	86.26%	82.42%	79.81%	74.74%
Black or African American alone (NH)	13,469	14,258	14,912	14,630	14,275	9.51%	10.49%	10.81%	10.75%	10.63%
Native American or Alaska Native alone (NH)	452	659	787	714	683	0.32%	0.48%	0.57%	0.52%	0.51%
Asian alone (NH)	541	1,044	1,516	2,154	3,715	0.38%	0.77%	1.10%	1.58%	2.77%
Native Hawaiian or Pacific Islander alone (NH)	x	x	27	45	29	x	x	0.02%	0.03%	0.02%
Other race alone (NH)	309	139	158	142	553	0.22%	0.10%	0.11%	0.10%	0.41%
Mixed race or Multiracial (NH)	x	x	2,511	3,620	7,244	x	x	1.82%	2.66%	5.39%
Hispanic or Latino (any race)	2,433	2,583	4,351	6,177	7,426	1.72%	1.90%	3.15%	4.54%	5.53%
Total	141,557	135,982	137,985	136,146	134,310	100.00%	100.00%	100.00%	100.00%	100.00%

=== 2010 census ===
The 2010 United States census indicates Calhoun County had a 2010 population of 136,146. This is a decrease of -1,839 people from the 2000 United States census. Overall, the county had a -1.3% growth rate during this ten-year period. In 2010 there were 54,016 households and 35,220 families in the county. The population density was 192.8 per square mile (74.4 square kilometers). There were 61,042 housing units at an average density of 86.4 per square mile (33.4 square kilometers). The racial and ethnic makeup of the county was 79.8% White, 10.7% Black or African American, 0.5% Native American, 1.6% Asian, 4.5% Hispanic or Latino, 0.1% from other races, and 2.7% from two or more races.

There were 54,016 households, out of which 31.2% had children under the age of 18 living with them, 45.3% were husband and wife families, 14.6% had a female householder with no husband present, 34.8% were non-families, and 28.8% were made up of individuals. The average household size was 2.44 and the average family size was 2.98.

In the county, the population was spread out, with 24.2% under age of 18, 9.3% from 18 to 24, 24.0% from 25 to 44, 27.7% from 45 to 64, and 14.8% who were 65 years of age or older. The median age was 39 years. For every 100 females there were 95.5 males. For every 100 females age 18 and over, there were 92.5 males.

The 2010 American Community Survey 1-year estimate indicates the median income for a household in the county was $42,921 and the median income for a family was $49,964. Males had a median income of $25,712 versus $18,298 for females. The per capita income for the county was $20,661. About 11.7% of families and 16.2% of the population were below the poverty line, including 23.9% of those under the age 18 and 5.8% of those age 65 or over.

=== 2020 census ===
As of the 2020 census, the county had a population of 134,310. The median age was 40.5 years. 22.8% of residents were under the age of 18 and 18.4% of residents were 65 years of age or older. For every 100 females there were 98.0 males, and for every 100 females age 18 and over there were 96.0 males age 18 and over.

The racial makeup of the county was 76.5% White, 10.8% Black or African American, 0.7% American Indian and Alaska Native, 2.8% Asian, <0.1% Native Hawaiian and Pacific Islander, 2.1% from some other race, and 7.1% from two or more races. Hispanic or Latino residents of any race comprised 5.5% of the population.

67.7% of residents lived in urban areas, while 32.3% lived in rural areas.

There were 54,406 households in the county, of which 28.6% had children under the age of 18 living in them. Of all households, 42.5% were married-couple households, 20.3% were households with a male householder and no spouse or partner present, and 28.7% were households with a female householder and no spouse or partner present. About 30.8% of all households were made up of individuals and 13.3% had someone living alone who was 65 years of age or older.

There were 59,518 housing units, of which 8.6% were vacant. Among occupied housing units, 69.9% were owner-occupied and 30.1% were renter-occupied. The homeowner vacancy rate was 1.6% and the rental vacancy rate was 8.9%.

== Government and politics ==
United States presidential election results for Calhoun County, Michigan
Year	Republican		Democratic		Third party(ies)	
Year	No.	%	No.	%	No.	%
1884	5,113	51.20%	4,309	43.15%	564	5.65%
1888	5,732	52.77%	4,358	40.12%	772	7.11%
1892	5,077	48.10%	4,150	39.31%	1,329	12.59%
1896	5,874	47.01%	6,202	49.64%	418	3.35%
1900	6,220	50.11%	5,560	44.79%	633	5.10%
1904	7,506	64.49%	3,102	26.65%	1,031	8.86%
1908	6,848	55.99%	4,240	34.67%	1,143	9.35%
1912	3,447	26.42%	3,781	28.98%	5,817	44.59%
1916	6,484	42.07%	8,037	52.15%	891	5.78%
1920	16,722	69.12%	6,291	26.00%	1,180	4.88%
1924	18,165	71.91%	4,020	15.91%	3,077	12.18%
1928	24,379	80.40%	5,769	19.03%	173	0.57%
1932	16,255	48.43%	16,281	48.51%	1,027	3.06%
1936	14,667	40.57%	20,231	55.96%	1,255	3.47%
1940	21,633	53.27%	18,682	46.00%	295	0.73%
1944	20,664	54.82%	16,611	44.07%	418	1.11%
1948	19,285	54.95%	15,077	42.96%	734	2.09%
1952	31,941	62.09%	19,171	37.26%	335	0.65%
1956	32,284	61.33%	20,184	38.34%	175	0.33%
1960	32,080	57.50%	23,511	42.14%	202	0.36%
1964	18,987	36.50%	32,939	63.31%	99	0.19%
1968	26,181	47.64%	22,633	41.18%	6,146	11.18%
1972	32,531	58.27%	22,154	39.68%	1,143	2.05%
1976	30,390	53.77%	25,229	44.64%	901	1.59%
1980	30,912	52.24%	23,022	38.90%	5,242	8.86%
1984	34,470	62.60%	20,313	36.89%	284	0.52%
1988	26,771	53.77%	22,717	45.63%	299	0.60%
1992	19,791	33.71%	25,542	43.51%	13,369	22.77%
1996	20,953	39.95%	26,287	50.12%	5,203	9.92%
2000	26,291	47.73%	27,312	49.59%	1,477	2.68%
2004	32,093	51.21%	29,891	47.70%	683	1.09%
2008	28,553	44.48%	34,561	53.84%	1,082	1.69%
2012	28,333	48.58%	29,267	50.18%	727	1.25%
2016	31,494	53.47%	24,157	41.01%	3,251	5.52%
2020	36,221	54.65%	28,877	43.57%	1,183	1.78%
2024	38,606	56.36%	28,988	42.32%	911	1.33%

United States Senate election results for Calhoun County, Michigan1
Year	Republican		Democratic		Third party(ies)	
Year	No.	%	No.	%	No.	%
2024	36,586	54.44%	28,321	42.14%	2,295	3.42%

Michigan Gubernatorial election results for Calhoun County
Year	Republican		Democratic		Third party(ies)	
Year	No.	%	No.	%	No.	%
2022	25,694	49.82%	24,916	48.31%	966	1.87%

The county government operates the jail, maintains rural roads, operates the major local courts, keeps files of deeds and mortgages, maintains vital records, administers public health regulations, and participates with the state in the provision of welfare and other social services. The county board of commissioners controls the budget but has only limited authority to make laws or ordinances. In Michigan, most local government functions — police and fire, building and zoning, tax assessment, street maintenance, etc. — are the responsibility of individual cities and townships.

Calhoun County is a swing county in presidential elections. Beginning in 1964, it has voted for the winner of the national election every time except in 1976 (instead backing native Michigander Gerald Ford), 2000, and 2020.

=== Elected officials ===
- Prosecuting Attorney: David E. Gilbert
- Sheriff: Steven Hinkley
- County Clerk/Register of Deeds: Kimberly A. Hinkley
- County Treasurer: Brian Wensauer
- Water Resource Commissioner: Tommy Miller

(information as of October 2020)

== Communities ==
=== Cities ===
- Albion
- Battle Creek
- Marshall (county seat)
- Springfield

=== Villages ===
- Athens
- Burlington
- Homer
- Tekonsha
- Union City (partial)

=== Charter townships ===
- Bedford Charter Township
- Emmett Charter Township
- Pennfield Charter Township

=== Census-designated places ===
- Brownlee Park
- Level Park-Oak Park

=== Other unincorporated communities ===
- Albion Landing
- Babcock
- Beadle Lake
- Bedford
- Bentleys Corners
- Ceresco
- Charlotte Landing
- Clarence Center
- Clarendon
- Condit
- Duck Lake
- East Leroy
- Eckford
- Greenfield Park
- Joppa
- Lee Center
- Maplehurst
- Marengo
- Old Mill Gardens
- Orchard Park
- Partello
- Pennfield
- Pine Creek
- Pine Creek Indian Reservation
- Rice Creek
- Sonoma
- Springfield Place
- Stanley Corners
- Sunrise Heights (subdivision)
- Verona
- Walnut Point
- Wattles Park
- West Leroy
- Wrights Corners

=== Townships ===
- Albion Township
- Athens Township
- Burlington Township
- Clarence Township
- Clarendon Township
- Convis Township
- Eckford Township
- Fredonia Township
- Homer Township
- Lee Township
- Leroy Township
- Marengo Township
- Marshall Township
- Newton Township
- Sheridan Township
- Tekonsha Township

== Historical markers ==
There are 83 recognized Michigan historical markers in the county.

== Education ==
K-12 school districts include:

- Athens Area Schools
- Battle Creek Public Schools
- Bellevue Community Schools
- Climax-Scotts Community School District
- Gull Lake Community Schools
- Harper Creek Community Schools
- Hastings Area School District
- Homer Community Schools
- Lakeview School District
- Litchfield Community Schools
- Marshall Public Schools
- Olivet Community Schools
- Pennfield School District
- Springport Public Schools
- Tekonsha Community Schools
- Union City Community Schools

There is also one elementary school district, Mar Lee School District.

== See also ==
- List of Michigan county name etymologies
- List of Michigan State Historic Sites in Calhoun County
- National Register of Historic Places listings in Calhoun County, Michigan
- List of counties in Michigan
