= Sheridan Township, Calhoun County, Michigan =

Sheridan Township, Michigan
- Township
- Location within the state of Michigan
- Coordinates: 42°16′47″N 84°45′59″W
- Country: United States
- State: Michigan
- County: Calhoun

Area
  - Total: 31.8 sq mi (82.3 km^{2})
  - Land: 31.3 sq mi (81.1 km^{2})
  - Water: 0.42 sq mi (1.1 km^{2})
- Elevation: 935 ft (285 m)

Population (2020)
  - Total: 1,809
  - Density: 57.8/sq mi (22.3/km^{2})
- Time zone: UTC-5 (Eastern (EST))
  - Summer (DST): UTC-4 (EDT)
- FIPS code: 26-72980
- GNIS feature ID: 1627064
- Website: sheridantwp.com

Sheridan Township is a civil township of Calhoun County in the U.S. state of Michigan. It is part of the Battle Creek, Michigan Metropolitan Statistical Area. The population was 1,809 at the 2020 census.

== Geography ==
Sheridan Township is located in eastern Calhoun County and is bordered by Jackson County to the east. The city of Albion is along the southern boundary of the township but administratively separate. Interstate 94 runs through the township with access from two exits.

According to the United States Census Bureau, the township has a total area of 31.8 square miles (82.3 km^{2}), of which 31.3 square miles (81.1 km^{2}) is land and 0.42 square miles (1.1 km^{2}), or 1.38%, is water.

== Demographics ==
Historical population
Census	Pop.	Note	%±
1960	2,159		—
1970	2,469		14.4%
1980	2,257		−8.6%
1990	2,139		−5.2%
2000	2,116		−1.1%
2010	1,936		−8.5%
2020	1,809		−6.6%
Source: Census Bureau. Census 1960- 2000, 2010.

As of the census of 2000, there were 2,116 people, 770 households, and 559 families residing in the township. The population density was 67.3 inhabitants per square mile (26.0/km^{2}). There were 823 housing units at an average density of 26.2 per square mile (10.1/km^{2}). The racial makeup of the township was 87.81% White, 7.84% African American, 0.61% Native American, 0.24% Asian, 0.99% from other races, and 2.50% from two or more races. Hispanic or Latino of any race were 2.74% of the population.

There were 770 households, out of which 27.4% had children under the age of 18 living with them, 57.0% were married couples living together, 11.0% had a female householder with no husband present, and 27.4% were non-families. 21.4% of all households were made up of individuals, and 9.1% had someone living alone who was 65 years of age or older. The average household size was 2.50 and the average family size was 2.84.

In the township the population was spread out, with 29.4% under the age of 18, 7.8% from 18 to 24, 24.0% from 25 to 44, 23.1% from 45 to 64, and 15.8% who were 65 years of age or older. The median age was 36 years. For every 100 females, there were 121.8 males. For every 100 females age 18 and over, there were 102.9 males.

The median income for a household in the township was $32,075, and the median income for a family was $37,656. Males had a median income of $29,000 versus $25,156 for females. The per capita income for the township was $14,886. About 7.9% of families and 11.3% of the population were below the poverty line, including 16.0% of those under age 18 and 13.6% of those age 65 or over.
