= Convis Township, Michigan =

- Township
- Location within the state of Michigan
- Coordinates: 42°22′58″N 84°59′51″W
- Country: United States
- State: Michigan
- County: Calhoun

Area
  - Total: 36.5 sq mi (94.5 km^{2})
  - Land: 35.4 sq mi (91.6 km^{2})
  - Water: 1.1 sq mi (2.9 km^{2})
- Elevation: 945 ft (288 m)

Population (2020)
  - Total: 1,508
  - Density: 42.6/sq mi (16.5/km^{2})
- Time zone: UTC-5 (Eastern (EST))
  - Summer (DST): UTC-4 (EDT)
- FIPS code: 26-17880
- GNIS feature ID: 1626129
- Website: convistownshipmi.gov

Convis Township is a civil township of Calhoun County in the U.S. state of Michigan. It is part of the Battle Creek metropolitan statistical area. The population was 1,508 at the 2020 census.

== History ==
Convis Township was established in 1837.

== Geography ==
According to the United States Census Bureau, the township has a total area of 36.5 square miles (94.5 km^{2}), of which 35.4 square miles (91.6 km^{2}) is land and 1.1 square miles (2.9 km^{2}), or 3.05%, is water.

== Demographics ==
Historical population
Census	Pop.	Note	%±
1960	1,068		—
1970	1,287		20.5%
1980	1,734		34.7%
1990	1,739		0.3%
2000	1,666		−4.2%
2010	1,636		−1.8%
2020	1,508		−7.8%
Source: Census Bureau. Census 1960- 2000, 2010.

As of the census of 2000, there were 1,666 people, 622 households, and 475 families residing in the township. The population density was 47.2 inhabitants per square mile (18.2/km^{2}). There were 651 housing units at an average density of 18.4 units per square mile (7.1 units/km^{2}). The racial makeup of the township was 98.08% White, 0.06% African American, 0.30% Native American, 0.18% Asian, 0.36% from other races, and 1.02% from two or more races. Hispanic or Latino of any race were 1.68% of the population.

There were 622 households, out of which 33.6% had children under the age of 18 living with them, 63.0% were married couples living together, 8.2% had a female householder with no husband present, and 23.6% were non-families. 20.1% of all households were made up of individuals, and 7.2% had someone living alone who was 65 years of age or older. The average household size was 2.66 and the average family size was 3.04.

In the township the population was spread out, with 25.3% under the age of 18, 7.8% from 18 to 24, 27.4% from 25 to 44, 28.0% from 45 to 64, and 11.5% who were 65 years of age or older. The median age was 39 years. For every 100 females, there were 102.7 males. For every 100 females age 18 and over, there were 100.3 males.

The median income for a household in the township was $42,222, and the median income for a family was $48,846. Males had a median income of $34,375 versus $25,556 for females. The per capita income for the township was $18,870. About 5.5% of families and 7.4% of the population were below the poverty line, including 7.7% of those under age 18 and 3.6% of those age 65 or over.
