= Lee Township, Calhoun County, Michigan =

Lee Township, Michigan
- Township
- Location within the state of Michigan
- Coordinates: 42°22′28″N 84°54′10″W
- Country: United States
- State: Michigan
- County: Calhoun

Area
  - Total: 36.4 sq mi (94.2 km^{2})
  - Land: 36.2 sq mi (93.8 km^{2})
  - Water: 0.15 sq mi (0.4 km^{2})
- Elevation: 928 ft (283 m)

Population (2020)
  - Total: 1,055
  - Density: 29.1/sq mi (11.2/km^{2})
- Time zone: UTC-5 (Eastern (EST))
  - Summer (DST): UTC-4 (EDT)
- FIPS code: 26-46620
- GNIS feature ID: 1626599
- Website: https://www.leetwpcc.com/

Lee Township is a civil township of Calhoun County in the U.S. state of Michigan. It is part of the Battle Creek Metropolitan Statistical Area. The population was 1,055 at the 2020 census.

== Geography ==
According to the United States Census Bureau, the township has a total area of 36.4 square miles (94.2 km^{2}), of which 36.2 square miles (93.8 km^{2}) is land and 0.15 square miles (0.4 km^{2}), or 0.43%, is water.

== Demographics ==
Historical population
Census	Pop.	Note	%±
1960	1,221		—
1970	1,104		−9.6%
1980	1,186		7.4%
1990	1,281		8.0%
2000	1,257		−1.9%
2010	1,213		−3.5%
2020	1,055		−13.0%
Source: Census Bureau. Census 1960- 2000, 2010.

As of the census of 2000, there were 1,257 people, 430 households, and 338 families residing in the township. The population density was 34.7 inhabitants per square mile (13.4/km^{2}). There were 462 housing units at an average density of 12.7 per square mile (4.9/km^{2}). The racial makeup of the township was 95.70% White, 0.16% African American, 0.48% Native American, 0.08% Asian, 2.31% from other races, and 1.27% from two or more races. Hispanic or Latino of any race were 2.78% of the population.

There were 430 households, out of which 40.0% had children under the age of 18 living with them, 62.6% were married couples living together, 8.1% had a female householder with no husband present, and 21.2% were non-families. 15.3% of all households were made up of individuals, and 6.7% had someone living alone who was 65 years of age or older. The average household size was 2.88 and the average family size was 3.17.

In the township the population was spread out, with 28.0% under the age of 18, 11.1% from 18 to 24, 29.8% from 25 to 44, 22.7% from 45 to 64, and 8.4% who were 65 years of age or older. The median age was 34 years. For every 100 females, there were 113.1 males. For every 100 females age 18 and over, there were 108.5 males.

The median income for a household in the township was $45,592, and the median income for a family was $48,603. Males had a median income of $35,577 versus $23,667 for females. The per capita income for the township was $19,445. About 7.6% of families and 10.3% of the population were below the poverty line, including 12.3% of those under age 18 and 5.9% of those age 65 or over.
