= Albion Township, Michigan =

- Township
- Location within the state of Michigan
- Coordinates: 42°11′45″N 84°45′46″W
- Country: United States
- State: Michigan
- County: Calhoun

Area
  - Total: 33.1 sq mi (85.6 km^{2})
  - Land: 32.6 sq mi (84.5 km^{2})
  - Water: 0.39 sq mi (1.0 km^{2})
- Elevation: 1,010 ft (308 m)

Population (2020)
  - Total: 1,094
  - Density: 33.5/sq mi (12.9/km^{2})
- Time zone: UTC-5 (Eastern (EST))
  - Summer (DST): UTC-4 (EDT)
- ZIP code: 49224
- Area code: 517
- FIPS code: 26-01000
- GNIS feature ID: 1625814
- Website: https://albiontwpmi.gov/

Albion Township is a civil township of Calhoun County in the U.S. state of Michigan. It is part of the Battle Creek, Michigan Metropolitan Statistical Area. As of the 2020 census, the township population was 1,094.

== History ==
Albion Township was established by a division of Homer Township in 1837.

== Communities ==
The city of Albion is located on the northern boundary of the township, though it is administratively autonomous. There are two small named locales in the township:

- Babcock is at 42°13′02″N 84°48′00″W, about 2 miles (3 km) southwest of Albion city. It is just west of the south branch of the Kalamazoo River. Midway Airport, a small airfield, is nearby. The elevation is 959 feet (292 m) above sea level.
- Condit is at 42°11′18″N 84°47′12″W, about 4 miles (6 km) southwest of Albion city and 2 miles (3 km) north of Homer.

== Geography ==
According to the United States Census Bureau, the township has a total area of 33.1 square miles (85.6 km^{2}), of which 32.6 square miles (84.5 km^{2}) is land and 0.39 square miles (1.0 km^{2}), or 1.22%, is water.

== Demographics ==
Historical population
Census	Pop.	Note	%±
1960	1,374		—
1970	1,582		15.1%
1980	1,413		−10.7%
1990	1,256		−11.1%
2000	1,200		−4.5%
2010	1,123		−6.4%
2020	1,094		−2.6%
Source: Census Bureau. Census 1960- 2000, 2010.

As of the census of 2000, there were 1,200 people, 466 households, and 353 families residing in the township. The population density was 36.6 inhabitants per square mile (14.1/km^{2}). There were 493 housing units at an average density of 15.1 per square mile (5.8/km^{2}). The racial makeup of the township was 94.58% White, 2.67% African American, 0.33% Native American, 0.08% Pacific Islander, 0.58% from other races, and 1.75% from two or more races. Hispanic or Latino of any race were 2.67% of the population.

There were 466 households, out of which 29.4% had children under the age of 18 living with them, 63.3% were married couples living together, 7.7% had a female householder with no husband present, and 24.2% were non-families. 19.5% of all households were made up of individuals, and 9.2% had someone living alone who was 65 years of age or older. The average household size was 2.55 and the average family size was 2.91.

In the township the population was spread out, with 24.6% under the age of 18, 6.2% from 18 to 24, 27.2% from 25 to 44, 25.3% from 45 to 64, and 16.8% who were 65 years of age or older. The median age was 40 years. For every 100 females, there were 97.7 males. For every 100 females age 18 and over, there were 94.6 males.

The median income for a household in the township was $40,625, and the median income for a family was $44,531. Males had a median income of $33,500 versus $24,167 for females. The per capita income for the township was $16,849. About 7.1% of families and 8.8% of the population were below the poverty line, including 10.7% of those under age 18 and 7.9% of those age 65 or over.
