= Eckford Township, Michigan =

- Township
- Location within the state of Michigan
- Coordinates: 42°12′24″N 84°53′56″W
- Country: United States
- State: Michigan
- County: Calhoun

Area
  - Total: 35.7 sq mi (92.4 km^{2})
  - Land: 35.4 sq mi (91.7 km^{2})
  - Water: 0.27 sq mi (0.7 km^{2})
- Elevation: 978 ft (298 m)

Population (2020)
  - Total: 1,298
  - Density: 36.7/sq mi (14.2/km^{2})
- Time zone: UTC-5 (Eastern (EST))
  - Summer (DST): UTC-4 (EDT)
- ZIP Code: 49245
- Area code: 517
- FIPS code: 26-24700
- GNIS feature ID: 1626214
- Website: www.eckfordtownshipmi.gov

Eckford Township is a civil township of Calhoun County in the U.S. state of Michigan. It is part of the Battle Creek Metropolitan Statistical Area. The population was 1,298 at the 2020 census. Eckford Township was named after Henry Eckford.

== History ==
Eckford Township was first settled by Oshea Wilder-for whom Wilder Creek is named for. Wilder named the township after Henry Eckford a lifelong friend from England.

== Geography ==
According to the United States Census Bureau, the township has a total area of 35.7 square miles (92.4 km^{2}), of which 35.4 square miles (91.7 km^{2}) is land and 0.27 square miles (0.7 km^{2}), or 0.73%, is water.

== Demographics ==
Historical population
Census	Pop.	Note	%±
1960	1,261		—
1970	1,330		5.5%
1980	1,273		−4.3%
1990	1,217		−4.4%
2000	1,282		5.3%
2010	1,303		1.6%
2020	1,298		−0.4%
Source: Census Bureau. Census 1960- 2000, 2010.

As of the census of 2000, there were 1,282 people, 476 households, and 369 families residing in the township. The population density was 36.2 inhabitants per square mile (14.0/km^{2}). There were 513 housing units at an average density of 14.5 per square mile (5.6/km^{2}). The racial makeup of the township was 97.58% White, 0.16% African American, 0.78% Native American, 0.08% Asian, 0.31% from other races, and 1.09% from two or more races. Hispanic or Latino of any race were 0.86% of the population.

There were 476 households, out of which 34.2% had children under the age of 18 living with them, 70.0% were married couples living together, 5.3% had a female householder with no husband present, and 22.3% were non-families. 18.1% of all households were made up of individuals, and 6.5% had someone living alone who was 65 years of age or older. The average household size was 2.68 and the average family size was 3.08.

In the township the population was spread out, with 27.1% under the age of 18, 5.5% from 18 to 24, 28.9% from 25 to 44, 26.1% from 45 to 64, and 12.5% who were 65 years of age or older. The median age was 39 years. For every 100 females, there were 96.3 males. For every 100 females age 18 and over, there were 96.8 males.

The median income for a household in the township was $48,382, and the median income for a family was $52,188. Males had a median income of $36,853 versus $27,574 for females. The per capita income for the township was $19,835. About 4.8% of families and 5.9% of the population were below the poverty line, including 9.2% of those under age 18 and 6.1% of those age 65 or over.
