= Tekonsha Township, Michigan =

- Township
- Location within the state of Michigan
- Coordinates: 42°5′58″N 84°59′36″W
- Country: United States
- State: Michigan
- County: Calhoun

Area
  - Total: 36.3 sq mi (93.9 km^{2})
  - Land: 35.4 sq mi (91.7 km^{2})
  - Water: 0.85 sq mi (2.2 km^{2})
- Elevation: 942 ft (287 m)

Population (2020)
  - Total: 1,520
  - Density: 42.9/sq mi (16.6/km^{2})
- Time zone: UTC-5 (Eastern (EST))
  - Summer (DST): UTC-4 (EDT)
- ZIP code: 49092
- Area code: 517
- FIPS code: 26-79180
- GNIS feature ID: 1627157
- Website: tekonshatownship.com

Tekonsha Township is a civil township of Calhoun County in the U.S. state of Michigan. It is part of the Battle Creek, Michigan Metropolitan Statistical Area. The population was 1,520 at the 2020 census.

== Communities ==
- The village of Tekonsha is in the southern part of the township.

== Geography ==
According to the United States Census Bureau, the township has a total area of 36.3 square miles (93.9 km^{2}), of which 35.4 square miles (91.7 km^{2}) is land and 0.85 square miles (2.2 km^{2}), or 2.39%, is water. The St. Joseph River flows from east to west through the township, past the village of Tekonsha.

== Demographics ==
Historical population
Census	Pop.	Note	%±
1960	1,615		—
1970	1,683		4.2%
1980	1,771		5.2%
1990	1,749		−1.2%
2000	1,734		−0.9%
2010	1,645		−5.1%
2020	1,520		−7.6%
Source: Census Bureau. Census 1960- 2000, 2010.

As of the census of 2000, there were 1,734 people, 681 households, and 491 families residing in the township. The population density was 48.6 inhabitants per square mile (18.8/km^{2}). There were 702 housing units at an average density of 19.7 per square mile (7.6/km^{2}). The racial makeup of the township was 97.75% White, 0.12% African American, 0.35% Native American, 0.06% from other races, and 1.73% from two or more races. Hispanic or Latino of any race were 0.81% of the population.

There were 681 households, out of which 31.1% had children under the age of 18 living with them, 58.3% were married couples living together, 8.1% had a female householder with no husband present, and 27.8% were non-families. 21.6% of all households were made up of individuals, and 8.1% had someone living alone who was 65 years of age or older. The average household size was 2.55 and the average family size was 2.94.

In the township the population was spread out, with 25.0% under the age of 18, 7.3% from 18 to 24, 28.8% from 25 to 44, 26.9% from 45 to 64, and 12.1% who were 65 years of age or older. The median age was 38 years. For every 100 females, there were 99.5 males. For every 100 females age 18 and over, there were 99.5 males.

The median income for a household in the township was $42,121, and the median income for a family was $47,891. Males had a median income of $33,900 versus $25,063 for females. The per capita income for the township was $18,604. About 5.0% of families and 7.5% of the population were below the poverty line, including 7.2% of those under age 18 and 8.5% of those age 65 or over.
