= Tekonsha, Michigan =

- Village
- Location of Tekonsha, Michigan
- Coordinates: 42°5′44″N 84°59′17″W
- Country: United States
- State: Michigan
- County: Calhoun

Area
  - Total: 1.05 sq mi (2.71 km^{2})
  - Land: 0.99 sq mi (2.57 km^{2})
  - Water: 0.054 sq mi (0.14 km^{2})
- Elevation: 938 ft (286 m)

Population (2020)
  - Total: 653
  - Density: 657.8/sq mi (253.98/km^{2})
- Time zone: UTC-5 (Eastern (EST))
  - Summer (DST): UTC-4 (EDT)
- ZIP code: 49092
- Area code: 517
- FIPS code: 26-79160
- GNIS feature ID: 1614666
- Website: villageoftekonsha.com

Tekonsha is a village in Tekonsha Township, Calhoun County in the U.S. state of Michigan. It is part of the Battle Creek, Michigan Metropolitan Statistical Area. The population was 653 at the 2020 census.

== Geography ==
According to the United States Census Bureau, the village has a total area of 0.73 square miles (1.89 km^{2}), of which 0.71 square miles (1.84 km^{2}) is land and 0.02 square miles (0.05 km^{2}) is water.

== Demographics ==
Historical population
Census	Pop.	Note	%±
1880	497		—
1890	570		14.7%
1900	573		0.5%
1910	573		0.0%
1920	569		−0.7%
1930	595		4.6%
1940	636		6.9%
1950	647		1.7%
1960	744		15.0%
1970	739		−0.7%
1980	755		2.2%
1990	722		−4.4%
2000	712		−1.4%
2010	717		0.7%
2020	653		−8.9%
Source: Census Bureau. Census 1960- 2000, 2010.

=== 2010 census ===
As of the census of 2010, there were 717 people, 282 households, and 194 families living in the village. The population density was 1,009.9 inhabitants per square mile (389.9/km^{2}). There were 312 housing units at an average density of 439.4 per square mile (169.7/km^{2}). The racial makeup of the village was 96.0% White, 0.4% Native American, 0.7% Asian, 0.1% from other races, and 2.8% from two or more races. Hispanic or Latino of any race were 0.8% of the population.

There were 282 households, of which 32.6% had children under the age of 18 living with them, 46.5% were married couples living together, 15.2% had a female householder with no husband present, 7.1% had a male householder with no wife present, and 31.2% were non-families. 23.4% of all households were made up of individuals, and 11.7% had someone living alone who was 65 years of age or older. The average household size was 2.54 and the average family size was 2.97.

The median age in the village was 40 years. 24.4% of residents were under the age of 18; 7.3% were between the ages of 18 and 24; 24.9% were from 25 to 44; 26.9% were from 45 to 64; and 16.5% were 65 years of age or older. The gender makeup of the village was 47.0% male and 53.0% female.

=== 2000 census ===
As of the census of 2000, there were 712 people, 290 households, and 198 families living in the village. The population density was 1,033.0 inhabitants per square mile (398.8/km^{2}). There were 298 housing units at an average density of 432.4 per square mile (167.0/km^{2}). The racial makeup of the village was 96.49% White, 0.14% African American, 0.56% Native American, and 2.81% from two or more races. Hispanic or Latino of any race were 0.84% of the population.

There were 290 households, out of which 30.7% had children under the age of 18 living with them, 53.4% were married couples living together, 9.3% had a female householder with no husband present, and 31.7% were non-families. 26.6% of all households were made up of individuals, and 10.3% had someone living alone who was 65 years of age or older. The average household size was 2.46 and the average family size was 2.93.

In the village, the population was spread out, with 24.7% under the age of 18, 8.3% from 18 to 24, 30.3% from 25 to 44, 22.9% from 45 to 64, and 13.8% who were 65 years of age or older. The median age was 37 years. For every 100 females, there were 93.0 males. For every 100 females age 18 and over, there were 94.9 males.

The median income for a household in the village was $39,917, and the median income for a family was $48,375. Males had a median income of $34,375 versus $25,750 for females. The per capita income for the village was $18,531. About 4.8% of families and 7.1% of the population were below the poverty line, including 5.4% of those under age 18 and 5.4% of those age 65 or over.

== Notable people ==
- Talbert Abrams, photographer and aviator known as the "Father of Aerial Photography"
