= M-294 (Michigan highway) =

State highway in Emmett Township, Calhoun County, Michigan, United States

M-294
- Beadle Lake Road
- M-294 highlighted in red

Route information
- Maintained by MDOT
- Length: 1.535 mi (2.470 km)
- Existed: October 31, 1998–present

Major junctions
- South end: I-94 near Battle Creek
- North end: M-96 near Battle Creek

Location
- Country: United States
- State: Michigan
- Counties: Calhoun

Highway system
- Michigan State Trunkline Highway System; Interstate; US; State; Byways
← I-275	→ I-296

M-294 is a state trunkline highway in Calhoun County in the US state of Michigan. It is one of a handful of highways that was established or realigned as a result of a rationalization process initiated in 1998 during the tenure of Governor John Engler. M-294 is approximately two miles (3.2 km) east of Interstate 194 (I-194) and connects M-96 with I-94 southeast of Battle Creek.

== Route description ==
M-294 runs northward along Beadle Lake Road from I-94 at exit 100 north through a commercial area. Past these businesses, the adjoining land is not developed for a short distance, and the roadway runs through some woodlands. North of the intersection with Golden Avenue, the highway passes through a residential neighborhood before terminating at M-96 (Columbia Avenue). The highway lies entirely within Emmett Township just southeast of Battle Creek. The trunkline carries an average annual daily traffic of 6,078 vehicles south, and 5,728 vehicles north, of Golden Avenue according to a traffic survey completed by the Michigan Department of Transportation (MDOT) in 2010. The highway has not been included as a part of the National Highway System, a system of highways important to the nation's economy, defense, and mobility.

== History ==
Beadle Lake Road was transferred to state jurisdiction on October 31, 1998. The new highway was assigned the M-294 designation by MDOT and first included on the 1999 state map. The routing has remained unchanged since.

== Major intersections ==
The entire highway is in Emmett Township, Calhoun County.

mi	km	Destinations	Notes
0.000	0.000	I-94 – Chicago, Detroit	Exit 100 on I-94
1.535	2.470	M-96 (Columbia Avenue)	
1.000 mi = 1.609 km; 1.000 km = 0.621 mi
