= Business routes of Interstate 94 in Michigan =

List of business route highways in Michigan

Business Loop Interstate 94
- Business routes of I-94 highlighted in red

Location
- Country: United States
- State: Michigan

Highway system
- Interstate Highway System; Main; Auxiliary; Suffixed; Business; Future; Michigan State Trunkline Highway System; Interstate; US; State; Byways
← I-94	→ M-94

There are currently eight business routes of Interstate 94 (I-94) in the US state of Michigan. These business routes connect I-94 to the downtown business districts of neighboring cities. Seven of the eight routes are business loops which bear the Business Loop I-94 (BL I-94) designation while one is a business spur that bears the Business Spur I-94 (BS I-94). These loops are former routings of I-94's two predecessors in Michigan: US Highway 12 (US 12) or US 25. The westernmost BL I-94 runs through the twin cities of Benton Harbor and St. Joseph along the former routing of US 12 and US 31/US 33 that now includes a section of the Lake Michigan Circle Tour in the state. The loops in Kalamazoo, Battle Creek, Marshall, Albion, and Jackson were also formerly segments of US 12 which were later designated as separate version of Business US Highway 12 (Bus. US 12) through their respective cities before becoming BL I-94s in 1960. The BL I-94 in Kalamazoo was converted into BS I-94 in 2019. The route of the business loop through Ann Arbor was previously US 12 and then later M-14 before receiving its current moniker. The BL I-94 through Port Huron was previously US 25 and then Business US Highway 25 (Bus. US 25).

== Benton Harbor–St. Joseph ==
Business Loop Interstate 94
- Location: Benton Harbor–St. Joseph
- Length: 10.705 mi (17.228 km)
- Existed: 1960–present
- Tourist routes: Lake Michigan Circle Tour; West Michigan Pike Pure Michigan Byway

Business Loop Interstate 94 (BL I-94) is a 10.7-mile (17.2 km) state trunkline highway and business loop that runs from I-94 through the downtowns of Benton Harbor and St. Joseph. The highway begins at exit 23 on I-94 in Lincoln Township where it runs along Lakeshore Drive, passing through the community of Shoreham. This section of the loop has five lanes (two in each direction with a center turn lane) before it drops a lane in each direction south of Shoreham, and it is part of the Lake Michigan Circle Tour (LMCT). BL I-94 briefly runs concurrently with M-63 along Main Street in downtown St. Joseph. This section widens to a four-lane divided street. BL I-94 separates from M-63 on the one-way pairing of Ship Street (eastbound) and Port Street (westbound) for three blocks before crossing the St. Joseph River to Benton Harbor; the LMCT concurrency ends at this point.

From there, it follows the five-lane Main Street through downtown Benton Harbor through roundabouts at Riverview Drive and 5th Street. At the latter roundabout, the roadway narrows back to three lanes. The easternmost leg of the loop, from Urbandale Avenue easterly to the roundabout at Crystal Avenue, is a three-lane highway and, from there to the eastern terminus at exit 33 on I-94 and US 31 in Benton Township, is two lanes. At that partial cloverleaf interchange, the roadway defaults onto US 31.

The highway through the downtowns of Benton Harbor and St. Joseph was a part of US 12 when the United States Numbered Highway System was created in late 1926. US 31 was also routed concurrently through the area. The US 33 designation was later added to US 31 from the state line northward to US 12 in St. Joseph in 1937. On November 2, 1960, the I-94/US 12 freeway opened around the Benton Harbor–St. Joseph area, and the former route of US 12 through downtown was renumbered BL I-94. By the next year, US 33 was extended along BL I-94/US 31, and the eastern end of BL I-94 was converted to a divided highway. In 1962, US 31 was rerouted out of downtown Benton Harbor and St. Joseph to follow a new freeway east of Benton Harbor, removing it from BL I-94/US 33. When the business route was first constructed, it had half of a bridgeless diamond interchange each at Crystal and Euclid avenues, with the intent of building overpasses for both crossroads at a later date. Due to a high number of accidents at these two roads, construction began in 1966 to remove the two ramps at Euclid Avenue while also moving that road to an overpass and adding two more ramps at Crystal Avenue. Also as first constructed, the interchanges at each end of the route only consisted of two ramps; a third ramp was added to the eastern end before the highway opened, and the interchange at the western end was converted to a full interchange in 1979.

A new pair of bridges over the St. Joseph River and adjacent Morrison Channel opened in part in 1976 and in full in 1977, replacing bridges built in 1909 and 1911, and were named and dedicated the following month. A planned relocation south of St. Joseph, proposed as late as 1979, was never built. US 33 was truncated in 1986, removing it from BL I-94 and replacing it with M-63 the following year when signage was updated. The Great Lakes Circle Tours were approved by the Michigan Department of Transportation (MDOT) and its counterparts in Minnesota, Ontario, and Wisconsin. In 2016, the section of the business loop concurrent with M-63 was dedicated as part of the West Michigan Pike Pure Michigan Byway.

The interchange at the eastern terminus was rebuilt as part of the completion of the St. Joseph Valley Parkway (US 31 relocation); the reconstruction started in 2020. The former diamond interchange at Crystal Avenue was also replaced with a roundabout in 2020. Parkway construction was completed in November 2022.

Major intersections
The entire highway is in Berrien County.

Location	mi	km	Destinations	Notes
Lincoln Township	0.000	0.000	I-94 / LMCT south – Chicago, Detroit	Exit 23 on I-94; southern end of LMCT concurrency
St. Joseph	5.537	8.911	M-63 south	Southern end of M-63 concurrency
St. Joseph	6.067	9.764	M-63 north / LMCT north	Northern end of M-63 and LMCT concurrencies
Benton Harbor–Benton Heights city line	8.469– 8.591	13.630– 13.826	M-139 south – Niles	Northern terminus of M-139
Benton Heights	9.487	15.268	Crystal Avenue	Roundabout; former at-grade intersection with connecting ramps
Benton Township	10.705	17.228	I-94 / US 31 – Chicago, Detroit, Niles	Exit 33 on I-94; exit 27 on US 31
1.000 mi = 1.609 km; 1.000 km = 0.621 mi: Concurrency terminus; Incomplete access

== Kalamazoo ==
Business Spur Interstate 94
- Location: Kalamazoo
- Length: 2.885 mi (4.643 km)
- Existed: 2019–present
- History: 1960–2019 as BL I-94

Business Spur Interstate 94 (BS I-94) is a state trunkline highway that forms a business spur for 2.9 miles (4.7 km) from near downtown Kalamazoo to the I-94 freeway. The western terminus is on the far-eastern edge of the city, where BS I-94 intersects the western end of M-96. BS I-94 follows Amvets Memorial Parkway, a four-lane expressway to its eastern terminus at I-94's exit 81.

On December 7, 1959, the I-94/US 12 freeway opened on the south side of Kalamazoo. When US 12 was shifted to follow the new freeway, the former route through downtown Kalamazoo was redesignated Business US Highway 12 (Bus. US 12). The next year, it was renumbered Business Loop I-94 (BL I-94). In 1963, the US 131 freeway opened on the west side of Kalamazoo. Along with the creation of Bus. US 131 along a portion of the BL I-94 routing, BL I-94 was rerouted along the US 131 freeway on the west end back to I-94. The section of Stadium Drive west of US 131 and the 9th Street routing was removed from BL I-94. Kalamazoo and the newly built Michikal avenues were transferred to state jurisdiction in 1965. Afterward, Kalamazoo and Michigan avenues were used as a pair of one-way streets downtown. Kalamazoo and Michikal were then signed as westbound BL I-94 from Stadium Drive to Michigan Avenue while Main Street and Michigan Avenue continued to serve eastbound traffic.

The City of Kalamazoo accepted jurisdiction of the trunklines within the city's downtown from MDOT in January 2019; and several highway changes were made as a result. BL I-94 was removed from the US 131 freeway and Stadium Drive, although a section of the latter has been retained by the state as an unsigned highway. The rest of the BL I-94 routing along Stadium Drive, Main Street, Michigan and Kalamazoo avenues, and King Highway was turned over to city control and removed from the state highway system. A short section of King Highway west of the M-96 junction was retained by the state as an unsigned highway, leaving the section of BL I-94 from M-96 east to I-94 as a signed highway, albeit renamed to BS I-94 to reflect the fact that it no longer reconnects to I-94 on both ends.

Major intersections
The entire highway is in Kalamazoo County.

Location	mi	km	Destinations	Notes
Kalamazoo	0.000	0.000	M-96 east – Battle Creek	Western terminus of M-96
Comstock Township	2.885	4.643	I-94 east – Detroit	Westbound exit to I-94 west and eastbound entrance from I-94 east
1.000 mi = 1.609 km; 1.000 km = 0.621 mi: Incomplete access

== Battle Creek ==
Business Loop Interstate 94
- Location: Battle Creek
- Length: 14.052 mi (22.615 km)
- Existed: 1961–present

Business Loop Interstate 94 (BL I-94) is a state trunkline highway serving as a business loop from I-94 through downtown Battle Creek. The highway begins at exit 92 on I-94 near the Kalamazoo–Calhoun county line. BL I-94 runs concurrently along M-37 northwesterly from the freeway on the two-lane Columbia Avenue on the eastern edge of Fort Custer. At an intersection south of W. K. Kellogg Airport, BL I-94/M-37 turns easterly to run on the southern side of the airport. At the airport's southeaster corner, the business loop intersects M-96 and turns northward, merging onto M-96. BL I-94/M-37/M-96 follows Helmer Road on the eastern edge of the airport to Dickman Road. At Dickman Road, M-37 turns westerly and BL I-94 turns easterly on a road that is four lanes wide with a center turn lane. From there, the business loop follows West Dickman Road along a four-lane divided highway (except between 24th and 20th streets) through a residential area on the northern side of Battle Creek. Dickman Road turns southeasterly as a five-lane undivided highway through downtown Battle Creek, parallel to a curve in the Kalamazoo River near its confluence with the Battle Creek River. BL I-94 skirts the edge of downtown by turning southward and then eastward to cross the Kalamazoo River. On the eastern side of the river, the business loop intersects I-194/M-66. East of the freeway interchange, Dickman Road narrows to three lanes and ends at Main Street. BL I-94 turns northwesterly along Main Street, northeasterly along Hamblin Avenue and then southeasterly on Michigan Avenue on the eastern side of downtown. BL I-94 follows the three-lane Michigan Avenue, narrowing to two lanes east of Porter Street. BL I-94 rejoins M-96 at an intersection with Columbia Avenue in Emmett Township near the Kalamazoo River. BL I-94/M-96 (Michigan Avenue) runs concurrently as a three-lane roadway through Emmett Township. The center turn lane drops southeast of Wattles Road, and the business loop continues to its eastern terminus at exit 104 on I-94.

In late 1940, a southerly bypass of downtown Battle Creek opened. US 12 was rerouted out of downtown to follow Columbia Avenue. The former route was redesignated Business US Highway 12 (Bus. US 12). In 1958 or 1959, a section of the route of Bus. US 12 was split onto a one-way pairing of streets through downtown Battle Creek. On December 7, 1959, the southern I-94/US 12 bypass of Battle Creek was dedicated and opened to traffic. The former routing of US 12 along Columbia Avenue was turned over to local control and the route of Bus. US 12 was extended via Michigan Avenue easterly and M-78 (Capitol Avenue) southerly to connect to the new freeway. Later the next year, this business loop was redesignated BL I-94. When the first segment of I-194 opened in 1961, BL I-94/M-78 was rerouted to follow the freeway. In 1964, the western end of the business loop was realigned to follow Dickman Road west to Fort Custer and south along Skyline Drive to I-94. The next year, as I-194 was completed and M-78 was replaced by an extended M-66, BL I-94 was rerouted through the downtown area. From Dickman Road, BL I-94 followed I-194/M-66 north to the end of the freeway at Hamblin Avenue and turned along Hamblin Avenue to Michigan Avenue via Jay Street. A minor realignment in 1970 shifted the connection between Hamblin and Michigan avenues. The one-way setup through downtown was removed in 1984. M-96 and M-37 were extended in 2000, running concurrently between Skyline Drive and the Helmer Road intersections. M-89 replaced part of M-37 but did not follow the latter's routing to I-194/M-66 near downtown. Then in 2008, BL I-94 was removed from the northern segment of I-194/M-66 freeway and rerouted to follow Dickman Road to Main Street back to Hamblin Avenue.

To expand the blast radius for ammunitions testing at Fort Custer, MDOT rerouted the business loop and M-37 to run along the southern and eastern edges of the airport instead of following roads on the opposite sides. This change was completed in 2015.

Major intersections
The entire highway is in Calhoun County.

Location	mi	km	Destinations	Notes
Battle Creek	0.000	0.000	I-94 – Chicago, Detroit M-37 north	Southern end of M-37 concurrency
Battle Creek	2.191	3.526	M-96 east (Columbia Avenue) – Marshall	Southern end of M-96 concurrency
Battle Creek	5.197	8.364	M-37 north / M-96 west – Hastings, Kalamazoo	Northern end of M-37/M-96 concurrency
Battle Creek	7.384	11.883	M-89 west	Eastern terminus of M-89
Battle Creek	8.260– 8.70	13.293– 14.00	I-194 / M-66	Exit 3 on I-194/M-66
Emmett Township	11.099	17.862	M-96 west	Western end of M-96 concurrency
Emmett Township	14.052	22.615	I-94 – Chicago, Detroit M-96 (Michigan Avenue) to M-311 south – Marshall	Eastern end of M-96 concurrency; exit 104 on I-94
1.000 mi = 1.609 km; 1.000 km = 0.621 mi: Concurrency terminus

== Marshall ==
Business Loop Interstate 94
- Location: Marshall
- Length: 5.707 mi (9.185 km)
- Existed: 1961–present
- Tourist routes: Marshall's Territorial Road Heritage Route

Business Loop Interstate 94 (BL I-94) is a 5.7-mile-long (9.2 km) state trunkline highway serving as a business loop from the I-94 freeway through downtown Marshall. The highway begins at a cloverleaf interchange in Marshall Township between I-94 and I-69, exit 108 on the former and exit 38 for the latter. The business loop turns southward running concurrently with I-69. At the interchange with M-96 about two miles (3.2 km) south, BL I-94 departs the fourl-lane freeway to follow Michigan Avenue northeasterly along a four-lane divided highway. Near the city limits, the highway intersects M-227 and then turns due east along a four-lane undivided street. Within the city limits, Michigan Avenue is a Pure Michigan Byway named Marshall's Territorial Road, (of the state-wide Territorial Road). The western half of Michigan Avenue in the city is mostly a residential neighborhood. The intersection with Kalamazoo Avenue is a roundabout around the Brooks Memorial Fountain. East of Kalamazoo Avenue, Michigan Avenue passes through the middle of downtown Marshall. East of downtown, Michigan Avenue once again passes through residential neighborhoods, narrowing to three lanes. The street angles northeasterly at the intersection with Gordon Street. At the intersection with the two-lane Partello Road in Marengo Township, BL I-94 turns northerly off Michigan Avenue past several businesses to its eastern terminus at I-94's exit 112.

The first business loop in Marshall was a Business US Highway 12 (Bus. US 12) that was designated in 1960 after the I-94/US 12 freeway was completed north of the city. It followed US 27 (Kalamazoo Avenue) to Michigan Avenue. From there, Bus. US 12 followed the current routing of BL I-94 along Michigan Avenue and Partello Road. The business route was redesignated as BL I -94 in late 1961. The section of BL I-94 along US 27 (Kalamazoo Avenue) became Bus. US 27 with the completion of the I-69/US 27 freeway bypass in 1967. BL I-94 was rerouted and cosigned with Bus. US 27 along Michigan Avenue and the new freeway on the west end. The concurrency with Bus. US 27 was removed in 1972. On January 11, 2001, BL I-94 inside the city of Marshall was designated as a Michigan Heritage Route (now called a Pure Michigan Byway).

Major intersections
The entire highway is in Calhoun County.

Location	mi	km	Destinations	Notes
Marshall Township	0.000	0.000	I-94 – Chicago, Detroit I-69 north – Lansing	Northern end of I-69 concurrency; exit 108 on I-94; exit 38 on I-69
Marshall Township	1.915	3.082	I-69 south – Fort Wayne M-96 west (Michigan Avenue) – Battle Creek	Southern end of I-69 concurrency; eastern terminus of M-96; exit 36 on I-69
Marshall	2.300	3.701	M-227 south	Northern terminus of M-227
Marengo Township	5.707	9.185	I-94 – Chicago, Detroit	Exit 112 on I-94
1.000 mi = 1.609 km; 1.000 km = 0.621 mi: Concurrency terminus

== Albion ==
Business Loop Interstate 94
- Location: Albion
- Length: 4.520 mi (7.274 km)
- Existed: 1961–present

Business Loop Interstate 94 (BL I-94) is a 4 1/2-mile-long (7.2 km) state trunkline highway serving as a business loop from the I-94 freeway through downtown Albion. The highway begins at exit 121 on I-94. The access from westbound I-94 is through a right-in/right-out connection on the north side of the freeway to C Drive North. State maintenance starts at the end of those ramps to C Drive North and runs to Eaton Avenue where the business loop turns southward to cross the freeway. The northern end of the business loop on Easton Avenue has five lanes (two in each direction with a center turn lane) running through a commercial area next to the freeway and continues with four lanes through residential neighborhoods southward to an intersection with M-199 (Austin Avenue). BL I-94 turns southeasterly along four-lane Austin Avenue for two blocks and then southward onto four-lane Superior Street. About five blocks farther south in downtown Albion, BL I-94 intersects M-99. The two highways turn eastward running concurrently along four-lane Michigan Avenue out of downtown. East of downtown, BL I-94/M-99 passes through residential areas and turns northeasterly at the intersection with Clark Street, narrowing to two lanes. The more rural section of Michigan Avenue carrying the business loop crosses into Parma Township in Jackson County. At exit 124 on I-94, BL I-94 ends and M-99 continues northward.

The I-94/US 12 freeway in opened in Calhoun County in 1960. At this time, Eaton Avenue was transferred to state control, and the rest of the former route of US 12 through Albion was redesignated Business US Highway 12 (Bus. US 12). Later that year, Bus. US 12 was redesignated BL I-94.

Major intersections

County	Location	mi	km	Destinations	Notes
Calhoun	Albion	0.000	0.000	I-94 – Chicago, Detroit	Exit 121 on I-94
Calhoun	Albion	1.196	1.925	M-199 west (Austin Avenue)	Eastern terminus of M-199
Calhoun	Albion	1.700	2.736	M-99 south (Superior Street) – Hillsdale	Western end of M-99 concurrency
Jackson	Parma Township	4.520	7.274	I-94 – Chicago, Detroit M-99 north (Eaton Rapids Road) – Eaton Rapids	Eastern end of M-99 concurrency; exit 124 on I-94
1.000 mi = 1.609 km; 1.000 km = 0.621 mi: Concurrency terminus

== Jackson ==
Business Loop Interstate 94
- Location: Jackson
- Length: 10.274 mi (16.534 km)
- Existed: 1960–present

Business Loop Interstate 94 (BL I-94) is a 10 1/4-mile-long (16.5 km) state trunkline highway that serves as a business loop from the I-94 freeway through downtown Jackson. The western end is at exit 138 on I-94 west of Jackson in Blackman Township. This interchange is also the eastern terminus of M-60 and the two run concurrently southward along a section of four-lane freeway west of Jackson County Airport. BL I-94/M-50 form a wrong-way concurrency; eastbound BL I-94 is also westbound M-60. Less than a mile (1.6 km) south of I-94, BL I-94 turns eastward onto the two-lane Michigan Avenue running south of the airport. East of Laurence Avenue, the street widens to include a center turn lane. The business loop then passes the Westwood Mall southeast of the airport and west of downtown; west of the mall, Michigan Avenue drops the center turn lane and widens to four lanes. At an intersection with West Avenue, BL I-94 merges with Bus. US 127 and M-50. On the western edge of downtown Jackson, traffic follows a one-way pairing of three-lane streets that form a loop around the center of the business district. The southern half carrying BL I-94 east/Bus. US 127 south/M-50 east follows Washington Avenue, and the northern half follows Louis Glick Highway. East of downtown, Cooper Street rejoins the two sides of the loop. South of the loop, Cooper Street carries Bus. US 127 south/M-50 east and north of the loop, it carries M-106. BL I-94 departs the loop north of the Grand River crossing near the Amtrak train station on the five-lane Michigan Avenue. The business loop continues northeasterly through the east side of Jackson in a commercial area. East of Page Avenue, the center turn lane drops and returns east of Dettman Road. BL I-94 crosses US 127 in Leoni Township. East of that freeway, it follows two-lane Ann Arbor Road past the campus of East Jackson Secondary School. The highway turns more northerly through a rural section of Jackson County. It is bounded by fields interspersed with some businesses. Ann Arbor Road turns eastward to run parallel to the south side of I-94 near Gilletts Lake. A connector, Sargent Road, intersects Ann Arbor Road to tie the business loop northward into an interchange with I-94 at exit 145.

The US 12 bypass of Jackson was partially completed in late 1951 or early 1952. US 12 turned south along US 127 (Lansing Road) at the end of the freeway to connect back to the existing routing of US 12 through the west end of town. The former routing along Ann Arbor Road and Michigan Avenue into downtown to US 12/US 127/M-50/M-60 became Business US Highway 12 (Bus. US 12) at this time. The bypass of Jackson was extended west to Parma in 1953. BUS US 12 was rerouted along US 127/M-50/M-60 on West Avenue to connect back to US 12. The last routing change to Bus. US 12 with the opening of the M-60 bypass of Jackson by the middle of 1961. Bus. US 12 was extended westward along Michigan Avenue to the new freeway west of town in Blackman Township and northerly to a new western terminus at I-94/US 12. The business loop was redesignated BL I-94 in late 1960.

In 1964, several changes were made to the business routes in downtown Jackson. Eastbound BL I-94 traffic was shifted off Michigan Avenue along Blackstone Street to Washington Avenue, and, from there, it ran along Washington to Francis Street and back to Michigan Avenue. The westbound traffic was shifted north at Mechanic Street to Pearl Street, continuing until turning south at Blackstone back to Michigan Avenue. The eastern end was updated further in 1968 to use Louis Glick Highway to connect to the northern half of the loop around downtown to Michigan Avenue. A set of connector streets on the western side of the downtown loop opened in November 1969 to streamline the flow of traffic further resulting in the last changes to the BL I-94 routing in Jackson. Eastbound traffic was redirected to the connector on Michigan Avenue just east of 3rd Street. This connector curved south then east to Washington Avenue near 1st Street. Louis Glick Highway was extended west from Blackstone curving south to merge into Michigan. In 2012, the eastern terminus of the business route was shifted easterly to follow Ann Arbor and Sargent roads to exit 145 on I-94; as a result, the former partial interchange between I-94 and Ann Arbor Road which formerly served as the business route's eastern terminus was obliterated.

Major intersections
The entire highway is in Jackson County.

Location	mi	km	Destinations	Notes
Blackman Township	0.000	0.000	I-94 – Chicago, Detroit M-60 west	Northern end of M-60 wrong-way concurrency; exit 138 on I-94
Blackman Township	0.969	1.559	M-60 west – Spring Arbor	Southern end of M-60 wrong-way concurrency; southern end of freeway segment
Jackson	3.832	6.167	Bus. US 127 north / M-50 west	Western end of Bus. US 127/M-50 concurrency
Jackson	4.156	6.688	Western end of one-way section	
Jackson	5.061	8.145	Bus. US 127 south / M-50 east – Hudson, Monroe	BL I-94 transitions between one-way directions of its concurrency partners
Jackson	5.226	8.410	Bus. US 127 north / M-50 west M-106 north	Eastern end of Bus. US 127/M-50 concurrency; eastern end of one-way section; southern terminus of M-106
Leoni Township	7.554– 7.565	12.157– 12.175	US 127 – Lansing, Hudson	Exit 39 on US 127
Leoni Township	10.274	16.534	I-94 – Chicago, Detroit	Exit 145 on I-94
1.000 mi = 1.609 km; 1.000 km = 0.621 mi: Concurrency terminus

== Ann Arbor ==
Business Loop Interstate 94
- Location: Ann Arbor
- Length: 8.436 mi (13.576 km)
- Existed: 1961–present

Business Loop Interstate 94 (BL I-94) is a business loop running from the I-94 freeway through downtown Ann Arbor. It starts at exit 172 on I-94 near on the western side of the city and follows four-lane Jackson Road easterly through a residential area and under I-94 before passing through a commercial area next to Veterans Memorial Park. East of the park, the business loop runs east-northeasterly along Jackson Road through residential areas to a Y intersection with Dexter Road and Huron Street. BL I-94 follows the four-lane Huron Street eastward into downtown Ann Arbor. At the intersection with Main Street, Bus. US 23 turns onto Huron Street, and the two designations run concurrently, adding a center turn lane to Huron Street for a few blocks. The business loop passes to the north of University of Michigan's Central Campus and then turns southward through it on the five-lane Washtenaw Avenue. Near Forest Avenue at the edge of campus, BL I-94/Bus. US 23 turns southeasterly through residential neighborhoods and drops the center turn lane again. At the intersection with Stadium Boulevard, Washtenaw Avenue turns more easterly, adds a center turn lane again and crosses County Farm Park. East of the park, BL I-94/Bus. US 23 runs through a commercial area out to US 23. At exit 37 on US 23, Bus. US 23 ends and BL I-94 turns southward along US 23. The business loop follows the four-lane freeway southward through a residential area on the edge of Ann Arbor and ends at exit 180 on I-94.

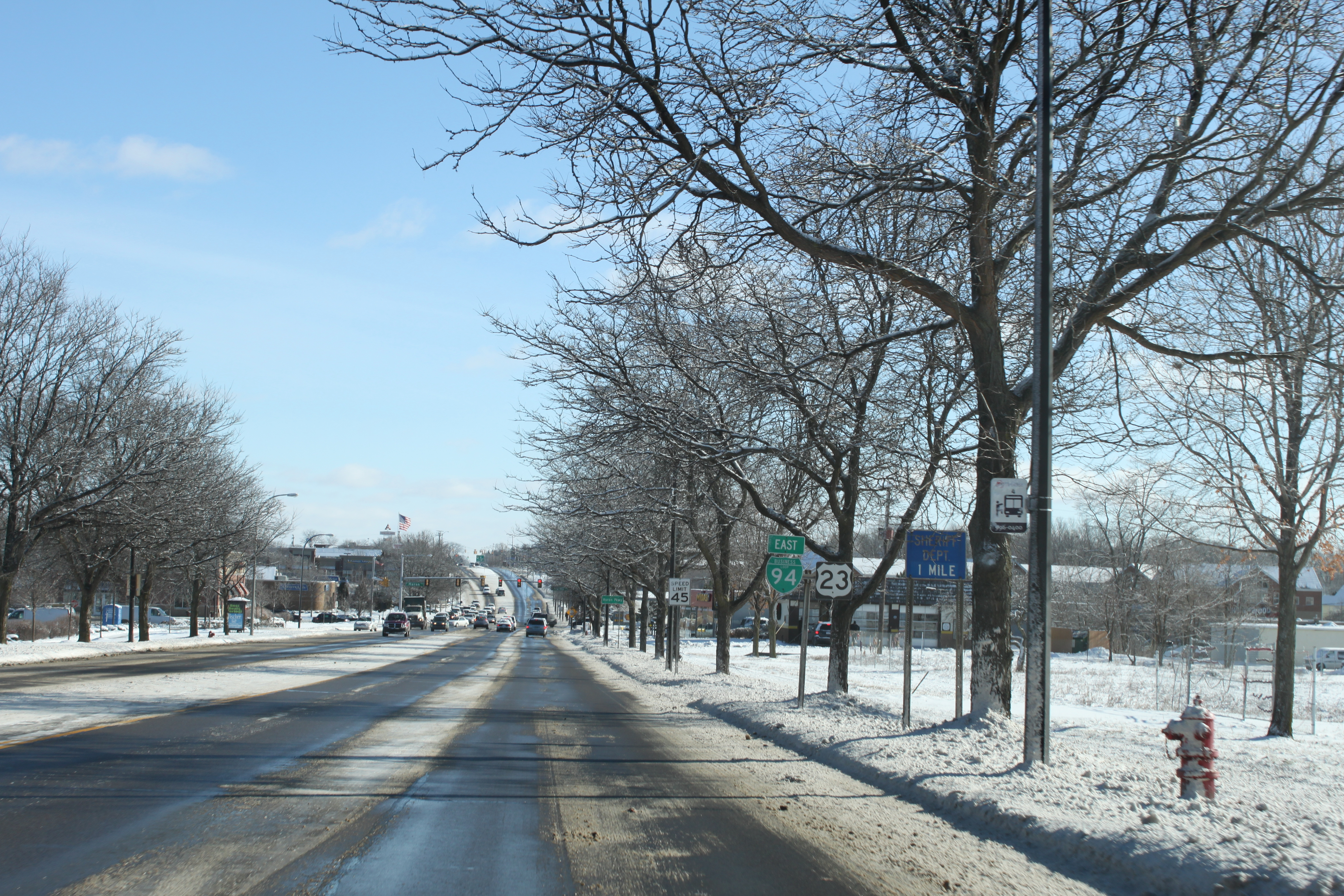
Washtenaw Avenue facing east

The business loop follows the former routing of US 12. This routing was first designated as M-14 in 1956 when US 12 was moved to a freeway bypass to the south of town. I-94 was first designated by the middle of 1960 along the US 12 freeway, and a new BL I-94 designation was created by the middle of the next year. BL I-94 followed M-14 from the Jackson Road interchange to Main Street along Jackson Road and Huron Street. At Main Street, BL I-94 turned along US 23 on Huron Street, Washtenaw Avenue and Carpenter Road back to I-94/US 12. The US 23 freeway was finished on November 2, 1962. BL I-94 was rerouted on the east end to follow the new US 23 freeway, returning the Carpenter Road alignment to local control. Bus. US 23 replaced US 23 along Huron Street and Washtenaw Avenue in the city of Ann Arbor at this time. A new M-14 freeway opened on November 16, 1965, removing the M-14 concurrency from the routing.

Major intersections
The entire highway is in Washtenaw County.

Location	mi	km	Destinations	Notes
Ann Arbor	0.000– 0.439	0.000– 0.707	I-94 – Chicago, Detroit	Exit 172 on I-94
Ann Arbor	2.275	3.661	Bus. US 23 north	Western end of Bus. US 23 concurrency
Ann Arbor–Pittsfield Township line	5.686	9.151	US 23 north – Flint M-17 east – Ypsilanti	Northern end of US 23 concurrency; exit 37 on US 23; western terminus of M-17
Pittsfield Township	8.436	13.576	I-94 – Chicago, Detroit US 23 south – Toledo	Southern end of US 23 concurrency; exit 180 on I-94; exit 35 on US 23
1.000 mi = 1.609 km; 1.000 km = 0.621 mi: Concurrency terminus

== Port Huron ==
Business Loop Interstate 94
- Location: Port Huron
- Length: 8.536 mi (13.737 km)
- Existed: 1986–present

Business Loop Interstate 94 (BL I-94) is an 8 1/2-mile-long (13.7 km) business loop serving the cities of Marysville and Port Huron. It starts southwest of Marysville near St. Clair County International Airport at exit 266 on I-94. The highway runs northeasterly along five-lane Gratiot Avenue past several businesses near the exit. BL I-94 enters Marysville and passes through the city's downtown area. On the eastern side of the city, the business loop turns northward along the four-lane divided Gratiot Boulevard near the St. Clair River. The intersection where the business loop turns is also the northern terminus of M-29. North of Ravenswood Road, BL I-94 splits into the one-way pairing of two-lane Military Street (northbound) and Electric Avenue (southbound). This area is mostly residential running along the river. Electric Avenue merges back into Military Street, which widens to four lanes, near Beard Street.

At the intersections with Oak Street (eastbound) and Griswold Street (eastbound), BL I-69 merges in from those two one-way streets. BL I-69/BL I-94 continues northward along Military Street through downtown Port Huron. The business loop crosses the Black River near its mouth. North of the river. the business loop follows Huron Avenue through the northern side of downtown Port Huron. At the intersection with Glenwood Avenue, BL I-69/BL I-94 turns northwesterly onto Pine Grove Avenue through a residential area on the northern side of the city. The street has five lanes (two in each direction plus a center turn lane). The business loop passes under I-94/I-69 at the toll and customs plazas for the Blue Water Bridge. There is a partial interchange to connect the business loop to and from the eastbound direction of the freeway and the toll plaza. North of the freeway crossing, the business loop intersects the southern end of M-25 and turns westward onto Hancock Street for two blocks. Then it turns southward along a connector freeway to terminate at an interchange with westbound I-94/I-69.

Before the completion of the freeways in the Port Huron area, the route of the business loop was part of US 25. After the freeway was completed in the area, the former route was redesignated Business US Highway 25 (Bus. US 25) in 1964. The US 25 designation was decommissioned in 1973, and the former Bus. US 25 through the area was designated as part of an extended M-25. In 1986, the BL I-94 designation was created, and the former BS I-69 was extended with it through downtown Port Huron. At the same time, M-25 was truncated to end on the north side of Port Huron.

Major intersections
The entire highway is in St. Clair County.

Location	mi	km	Destinations	Notes
Kimball Township	0.000	0.000	I-94 – Detroit, Port Huron	Exit 266 on I-94
Marysville	2.604	4.191	M-29 south (Busha Highway) – St. Clair	Northern terminus of M-29
Port Huron	5.469	8.802	BL I-69 west	Southern end of BL I-69 concurrency
Port Huron	7.818	12.582	I-94 east / I-69 east – Blue Water Bridge	Part of exit 275 on I-94/I-69
Port Huron	8.094	13.026	M-25 north (Pine Grove Avenue)	Southern terminus of M-25
Port Huron	8.536	13.737	I-94 west / I-69 west – Detroit, Flint BL I-69 east	Northern end of BL I-69 concurrency; western terminus at exit 275 on I-94/I-69
1.000 mi = 1.609 km; 1.000 km = 0.621 mi: Concurrency terminus
