= M-96 (Michigan highway) =

State highway in Michigan, United States

M-96
- M-96 highlighted in red

Route information
- Maintained by MDOT
- Length: 33.379 mi (53.718 km)
- Existed: 1926–present

Major junctions
- West end: BS I-94 at Kalamazoo
- M-37 at Springfield; I-194 / M-66 at Battle Creek
- East end: I-69 / BL I-94 at Marshall

Location
- Country: United States
- State: Michigan
- Counties: Kalamazoo, Calhoun

Highway system
- Michigan State Trunkline Highway System; Interstate; US; State; Byways
| ← BL I-96 | → M-97 |

M-96 is a state trunkline highway in the US state of Michigan that runs between Kalamazoo and Marshall. Its termini are both on business routes of Interstate 94 (I-94); the eastern one coincides with an intersection with I-69. Between Kalamazoo and Marshall it passes through Comstock, Galesburg, Augusta, and Battle Creek intersecting I-194/M-66 in Battle Creek and I-94 in Emmett Township.

The highway now known as M-96 was originally part of M-17. Parts of M-17 that were not used for US Highway 12 (US 12) in 1926 were given the M-96 number. Additional segments of trunkline were added to M-96, one of which was an Alternate US 12 in the years afterwards. Later, US 12 was moved after the completion of I-94 in southern Michigan. Additional US 12 segments were added to M-96 at that time. The last major changes to M-96 rerouted the highway through the Battle Creek area in late 1998.

== Route description ==
M-96 starts at an intersection between King Highway and Business Spur I-94 (BS I-94) east of downtown Kalamazoo. From this point, it follows King Highway over and then along the Kalamazoo River through a suburban residential area. The highway then follows Michigan Avenue east through Comstock and north of Morrow Lake. At Galesburg, M-96 turns northeast along Augusta Drive to Augusta, running through rural farmland. It turns eastward again, skirting the Fort Custer State Recreation Area and the Fort Custer National Cemetery. In Augusta, M-96 turns to follow Dickman Road to Battle Creek, passing north and east of the W. K. Kellogg Airport on Dickman and Helmer roads.

On the north side of the airport, M-96 runs concurrently with both Business Loop I-94 (BL I-94) and M-37. M-96 turns south on Helmer Road, separating from the other two trunklines, and then turns east crossing along Columbia Avenue. Here the highway runs along the edge of the city of Battle Creek through more residential areas and crosses the I-194/M-66 freeway next to the Riverside County Club. Near Brownlee Park, M-96 (Columbia Avenue) merges with BL I-94 (Michigan Avenue). Together BL I-94/M-96 continues along Michigan Avenue to I-94 where BL I-94 ends. M-96 passes the FireKeepers Casino Hotel, which is located just east of the ending of BL I-94, between 11 and 12 Mile Roads. M-96 continues along Michigan Avenue through farmland from Emmett to Marshall ending at an interchange with I-69/BL I-94.

M-96 is maintained by the Michigan Department of Transportation (MDOT) like other state highways in Michigan. As a part of these maintenance responsibilities, the department tracks the volume of traffic that uses the roadways under its jurisdiction. These volumes are expressed using a metric called annual average daily traffic, which is a statistical calculation of the average daily number of vehicles on a segment of roadway. MDOT's surveys in 2010 showed that the highest traffic levels along M-96 were the 22,953 vehicles daily between Capitol Avenue and I-194 in Battle Creek; the lowest counts were the 5,167 vehicles per day at the western terminus in Kalamazoo. The only section of M-96 that has been listed on the National Highway System (NHS), is in the Battle Creek area between the western BL I-94/M-37 junction and the I-94 interchange. The NHS is a network of roads important to the country's economy, defense, and mobility.

== History ==
M-96 was formed as a state trunkline in late 1926 from parts of M-17. The section of M-17 between Galesberg and Battle Creek was not utilized for US 12 and became M-96. In 1936, the Alternate US 12 trunkline was designated through the Battle Creek area along a section of highway that had previously been part of US 12. This highway was added to M-96 three years later in 1939.

A rerouting of trunklines in 1941 lead to the creation of a Business US 12 (Bus. US 12). M-96 ran concurrently with Bus. US 12 and M-37 was truncated to end at M-96. US 12 was rerouted between Galesburg and Kalamazoo in 1954, and M-96 was extended along the former US 12 routing to end in Kalamazoo. M-96 was rerouted in downtown Battle Creek to one-way streets in 1958, and Bus. US 12/M-96 was extended by the end of the decade when the I-94/US 12 freeway was completed in the area. Bus. US 12 was redesignated as BL I-94 in 1960 and M-96 was shortened to end at BL I-94/M-78 running on Capital Avenue. M-37 was reextended in 1961 in Battle Creek to a concurrent routing with M-96 in 1961.

M-89 was extended along the roadway used by M-96 west of Battle Creek to M-37 in 1965, truncating M-96 in the process. M-96 was reextended back to Battle Creek along Dickman Road and Fort Custer Highway from Augusta east in 1971. Several changes in Battle Creek were made to the area trunklines in 1998. M-96 was extended along BL I-94 (Dickman Road) to M-37 (Helmer Road) and along M-37 to Columbia Avenue. At Columbia, M-96 then turned east and M-37 turned west. M-96 rejoined BL I-94 along Michigan Avenue to I-94 and on to Marshall.

== Major intersections ==
| County | Location | mi | km | Destinations | Notes |
|---|---|---|---|---|---|
| Kalamazoo | Comstock Township | 0.000 | 0.000 | BS I-94 – Kalamazoo | Western terminus of BS I-94 |
| Calhoun | Springfield | 17.237– 17.409 | 27.740– 28.017 | BL I-94 west (Martin Luther King, Jr. Memorial Highway) / M-37 south (Skyline Drive) | Western end of BL I-94/M-37 concurrency |
| Calhoun | Springfield | 18.251 | 29.372 | M-37 north (Helmer Road) | Eastern end of M-37 concurrency |
| Calhoun | Springfield | 18.354 | 29.538 | BL I-94 east (Dickman Road) | Eastern end of BL I-94 concurrency |
| Calhoun | Emmett Township | 22.776 | 36.654 | I-194 / M-66 | Exit 2 on I-194/M-66 |
| Calhoun | Emmett Township | 23.346 | 37.572 | M-294 south (Main Street, Beadle Lake Road) | |
| Calhoun | Emmett Township | 25.129 | 40.441 | BL I-94 west (East Michigan Avenue) | Western end of BL I-94 concurrency |
| Calhoun | Emmett Township | 28.264 | 45.486 | BL I-94 east (11 Mile Road) to I-94 M-311 south (11 Mile Road) | Eastern end of BL I-94 concurrency |
| Calhoun | Marshall Township | 33.379 | 53.718 | I-69 – Lansing, Fort Wayne; BL I-94 – Marshall | Roadway continues as BL I-94 at exit 36 on I-69 |
1.000 mi = 1.609 km; 1.000 km = 0.621 mi: Concurrency terminus
