= M294 =

M294 or M-294 may refer to:

- a mutation of the haplogroup CT of Y-DNA in human genetics
- M-294 (Michigan highway), a state trunkline highway in Calhoun County in the United States of America
- the Public School number for Essex Street Academy (Seward Park campus) in the list of high schools in New York City – Manhattan
- the fiscal code for Bellizzi, a town and comune in the province of Salerno in the Campania region of south-western Italy
- the former Kriegsmarine code for M190 Seepferd (1956–1966), an ocean minesweeper of type 319 in the list of German Federal Navy ships
