= M-199 (Michigan highway) =

State highway in Calhoun County, Michigan, United States

M-199
- M-199 highlighted in red

Route information
- Maintained by MDOT
- Length: 4.030 mi (6.486 km)
- Existed: October 1, 1998–present

Major junctions
- West end: I-94 in Sheridan Township
- East end: BL I-94 in Albion

Location
- Country: United States
- State: Michigan
- Counties: Calhoun

Highway system
- Michigan State Trunkline Highway System; Interstate; US; State; Byways
← M-198	→ M-201

M-199 is a state trunkline highway near Albion in the US state of Michigan. The western terminus of the 4.030-mile-long (6.486 km) road is in Sheridan Township at exit 119 off Interstate 94 (I-94). The eastern terminus is a junction with Business Loop I-94 (BL I-94) downtown Albion. The entire road is within Calhoun County and runs through rural farm fields outside of Albion; in town it is a residential street. The M-199 designation had previously been applied to a highway in the Upper Peninsula in the 1930s. The current highway was previously part of other highways in the first half of the 20th century before it was transferred to local control around 1960. It was later transferred back to state control in 1998 and remains unchanged since.

== Route description ==
As a two-lane roadway, M-199 starts at exit 119 along I-94 northwest of Albion in Sheridan Township. The highway runs southward through farm fields along 26 Mile Road before curving to the southwest on Star Commonwealth Road near the campus of the Montcalm School for Boys and Girls, a private boarding school. At the end of this curves, the highway follows 25½ Mile Road southward to the intersection with Michigan Avenue. There M-199 turns easterly along Michigan Avenue and passes south of Montcalm Lake. The trunkline runs parallel to a line of the Norfolk Southern Railway until about the intersection with 26½ Mile Road. At the intersection with 27 Mile Road, M-199 enters the city of Albion, and the street name changes to Austin Avenue. In town, the highway follows a four-lane street through residential neighborhoods. The trunkline passes the northern edge of McAuliffe Park and runs parallel to the Kalamazoo River. At the intersection with Eaton Street, the highway meets BL I-94, where M-199 ends while the business loop continues southeasterly on Austin Avenue at this corner.

M-199 is maintained by the Michigan Department of Transportation (MDOT) like other state highways in Michigan. As a part of these maintenance responsibilities, the department tracks the volume of traffic that uses the roadways under its jurisdiction. These volumes are expressed using a metric called annual average daily traffic, which is a statistical calculation of the average daily number of vehicles on a segment of roadway. MDOT's surveys in 2010 showed that 1,185 vehicles per day used the roadway between I-94 and Michigan Avenue and between 3,174 and 4,042 vehicles used section along the combined Michigan and Austin avenues. No sections of M-199 have been listed on the National Highway System, a network of roads important to the country's economy, defense, and mobility.

== History ==
In the middle of 1933, an earlier designation of M-199 was used for a short spur route from US Highway 41 (US 41) into Daggett in Menominee County. This highway was decommissioned in 1939.

The current M-199 was once part of M-17 starting around July 1, 1919. When the US Highway System was created on November 11, 1926, the highway was incorporated into US 12. The Albion area was bypassed by a freeway (now I-94) at the end of the 1950s, and Michigan Avenue was turned over to local control. The current highway routing was transferred to state control on October 1, 1998, and the M-199 designation was subsequently assigned to the trunkline. The highway has remained unchanged since designation.

== Major intersections ==
The entire highway is in Calhoun County.

Location	mi	km	Destinations	Notes
Sheridan Township	0.000	0.000	I-94 – Detroit, Chicago	Exit 119 on I-94
Albion	4.030	6.486	BL I-94 (Eaton Street, Austin Avenue)	Austin Avenue continues southeasterly as BL I-94
1.000 mi = 1.609 km; 1.000 km = 0.621 mi
