= Ceresco, Michigan =

- Unincorporated community
- Location within the state of Michigan
- Coordinates: 42°16′19″N 85°03′41″W
- Country: United States
- State: Michigan
- County: Calhoun
- Elevation: 896 ft (273 m)
- Time zone: UTC-5 (Eastern (EST))
  - Summer (DST): UTC-4 (EDT)
- Area code: 269
- GNIS feature ID: 623025

Ceresco is a small unincorporated community in Calhoun County in the U.S. state of Michigan. Ceresco is situated on the Kalamazoo River approximately five miles west of downtown Marshall. It is on the boundary between Marshall Township and Emmett Charter Township at 42°16′19″N 85°03′41″W. Ceresco has a post office with ZIP Code 49033. The ZIP Code area serves portions of west and southwest Marshall Township, southeast Emmett Charter Township, northwest Fredonia Township, and a large portion of Newton Township.

== History ==
In 1838, a saw mill and flour mill were built on the Kalamazoo River at the site of what became Ceresco. Isaac E. Crary and John D. Pierce named the community by combining the name of Ceres, the Roman goddess of growing grains, with the first two letters of "company." The first post office was established on December 30, 1843, with Winslow S. Hale as the first postmaster.

The farming village of Ceresco, Nebraska is named after this place, the home town of Richard Nelson and Hod Andrus, two early settlers in the Nebraska hamlet.
