= Interstate 296 =

Unsigned Interstate Highway in Michigan, United States

Interstate 296
- I-296 highlighted in red

Route information
- Auxiliary route of I-96
- Maintained by MDOT
- Length: 3.393 mi (5.461 km)
- Existed: December 17, 1962–present
- History: Approval granted to remove signage on December 3, 1979
- NHS: Entire route

Major junctions
- South end: I-196 / US 131 in Grand Rapids
- North end: I-96 / US 131 / M-37 in Walker

Location
- Country: United States
- State: Michigan
- Counties: Kent

Highway system
- Interstate Highway System; Main; Auxiliary; Suffixed; Business; Future; Michigan State Trunkline Highway System; Interstate; US; State; Byways
← M-294	→ M-311

Interstate 296 (I-296) is a part of the Interstate Highway System in the US state of Michigan. It is a north–south state trunkline highway that runs for 3.43 miles (5.52 km) entirely within the Grand Rapids area. Its termini are I-196 near downtown Grand Rapids and I-96 on the north side of Grand Rapids in Walker. For most of its length, the Interstate runs concurrently with U.S. Highway 131 (US 131), which continues as a freeway built to Interstate Highway standards north and south of the shorter I-296. The highway was first proposed in the late 1950s and opened in December 1962, but the Michigan Department of Transportation (MDOT) has since eliminated all signage for I-296 and removed the designation from their official state map. The designation is therefore unsigned, but still listed on the Interstate Highway System route log maintained by the Federal Highway Administration (FHWA).

== Route description ==
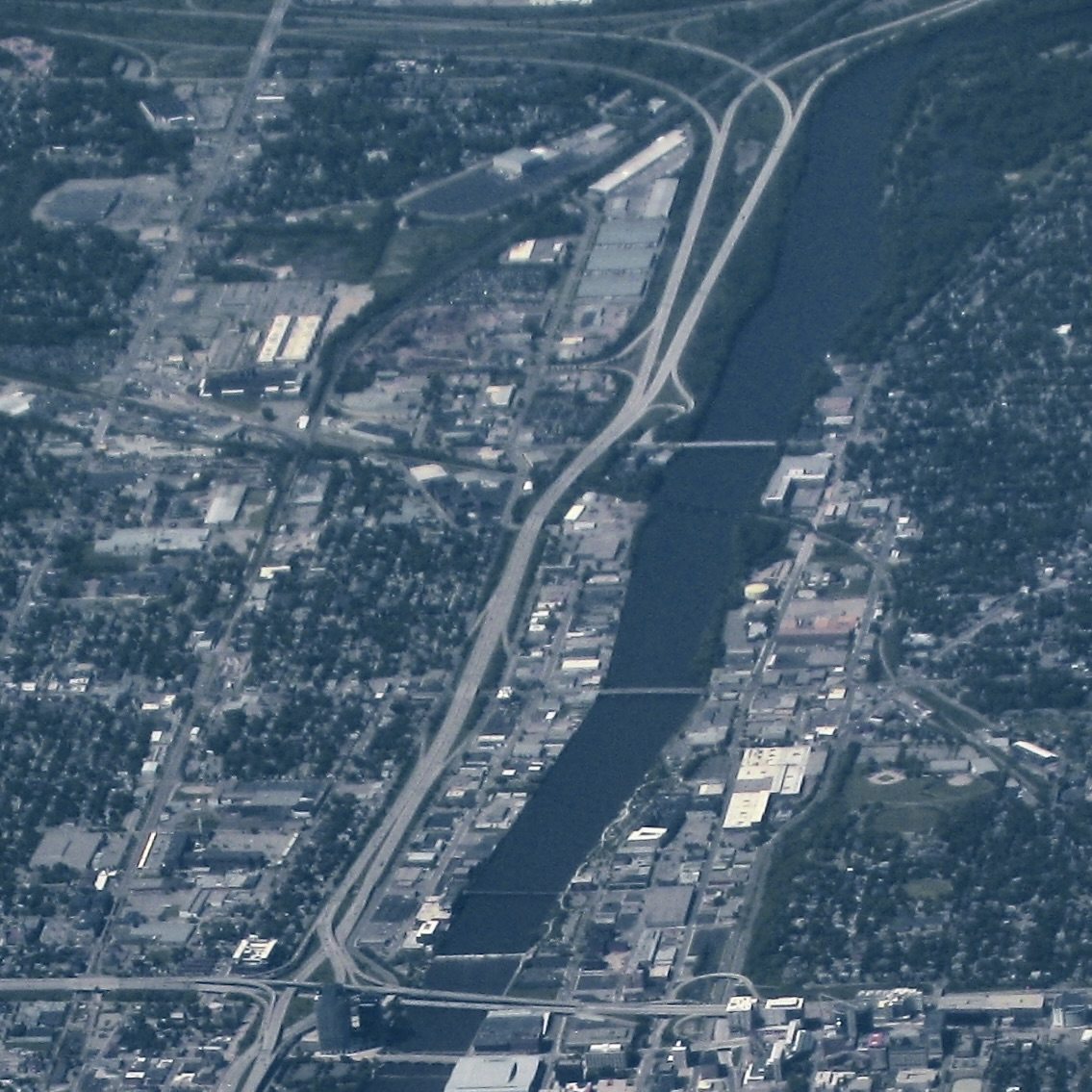
I-296, running parallel to the Grand River

I-296 begins at the I-196 interchange west of the Grand River and downtown Grand Rapids. For a short distance within the interchange, the three northbound lanes are on the left and the three southbound lanes are on the right, contrary to the normal traffic arrangement in the US. This anomaly is reversed north of the ramps for I-196 as the southbound lanes pass over the northbound lanes. Running parallel to the Grand River on the west bank, the freeway designation begins across the river from the 6th Street Bridge Park and Belknap Hill north of the Gerald R. Ford Presidential Museum and the DeVos Place Convention Center. The west side of the freeway faces residential neighborhoods and the east side borders commercial businesses and the river. South of the Ann Street interchange, the highway crosses a line of the Grand Rapids Eastern Railroad. After crossing both the railroad and Ann Street, the highway widens to allow for a grassy median. The freeway leaves Grand Rapids and enters Walker north of Ann Street.

Approaching I-96 from the south, the freeway passes east of the former DeltaPlex Arena, and the median widens further across the river from Comstock Riverside Park in Walker. An extra lane is added on the left, widening the freeway to four lanes. Unsigned I-296 occupies the left two lanes that form the left exit for I-96 from US 131. At the split between I-296 and US 131, I-296 curves northwesterly, and US 131 curves northeasterly to follow a bend in the Grand River. Once I-296 diverges from US 131, the highway crosses a rail line owned by CSX Transportation and passes over West River Drive. To the northwest of these crossings, exits emerge on the right for eastbound I-96 and the left for northbound M-37 (Alpine Avenue). Past these exits, I-296 merges into westbound I-96 and terminates. Southbound unsigned I-296 begins where the ramps to US 131 southbound split from eastbound I-96 at the Alpine Avenue overpass, collecting an on-ramp from M-37 and then merging with southbound US 131 north of Ann Street.

== History ==
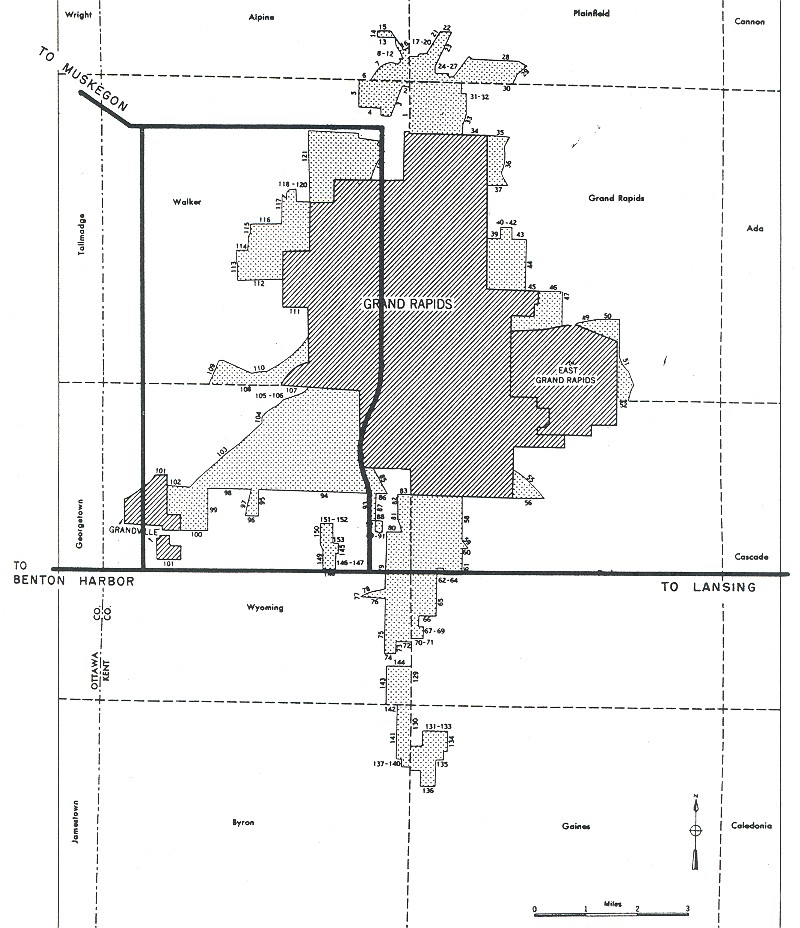
Planning map for the Grand Rapids area freeways from 1955

The development of a freeway along the modern-day I-296/US 131 corridor was proposed in the 1950s. The 1955 General Location of National System of Interstate Highways, an early platform for what would become the Interstate Highway System, contained an inset of the proposed freeways in and around the Grand Rapids area including a north–south freeway near the downtown area. Designated as part of the Interstate Highway System in 1957, I-296's construction was funded by the federal government. (Note: I-296 was constructed and included in the Interstate Highway System before 1978. The Surface Transportation Assistance Act of 1978 provided that all Interstate construction authorized under previous amendments to the system would be funded by the federal government but additional highway mileage added under 23 U.S.C. § 103(c)(4)(A) would not be supported by the same allocation of funds.)

The US 131 freeway was officially opened at 10 a.m. on December 17, 1962, between Pearl Street and (at the time) the I-196/US 16 freeway north of downtown. This freeway section encompassed all of I-296, which would connect I-196 north of town with I-96 downtown. (The I-96 and I-196 designations were later flipped west of Grand Rapids.) M-37 was relocated in Grand Rapids to utilize I-96 around the northeast side of town instead of I-296/US 131 in 1969.

At the end of the 1970s, MDOT took part in a FHWA-backed initiative called the Positive Guidance Demonstration Project, and the two agencies audited signage practices in the vicinity of the I-96/M-37 and I-296/US 131 interchange in Walker. MDOT determined that usage of the I-296 designation was "a potential source of confusion for motorists." FHWA agreed with the department's proposal to eliminate all signage and public map references to the designation in April 1979. MDOT then petitioned the American Association of State Highway and Transportation Officials (AASHTO) on June 22, 1979, for their permission to make the change, saying "it is felt that the I-296 designation serves no useful purpose other than to designate an Interstate routing." AASHTO approved the request on October 13. On October 24 that year, MDOT also requested formal permission from the FHWA to remove all signage and map references to I-296. The FHWA granted permission on December 3, 1979, on the condition that MDOT would continue to use the designation on official documents. The approval explicitly retained the highway in the Interstate system for funding and other purposes. The last state map to show the I-296 designation was published in 1979, as the 1980 map lacks any reference to the designation. Other maps, like the one published by the Kent County Road Commission, occasionally show I-296, and FHWA includes the designation in their Route Log and Finder List for the Interstate Highway System.

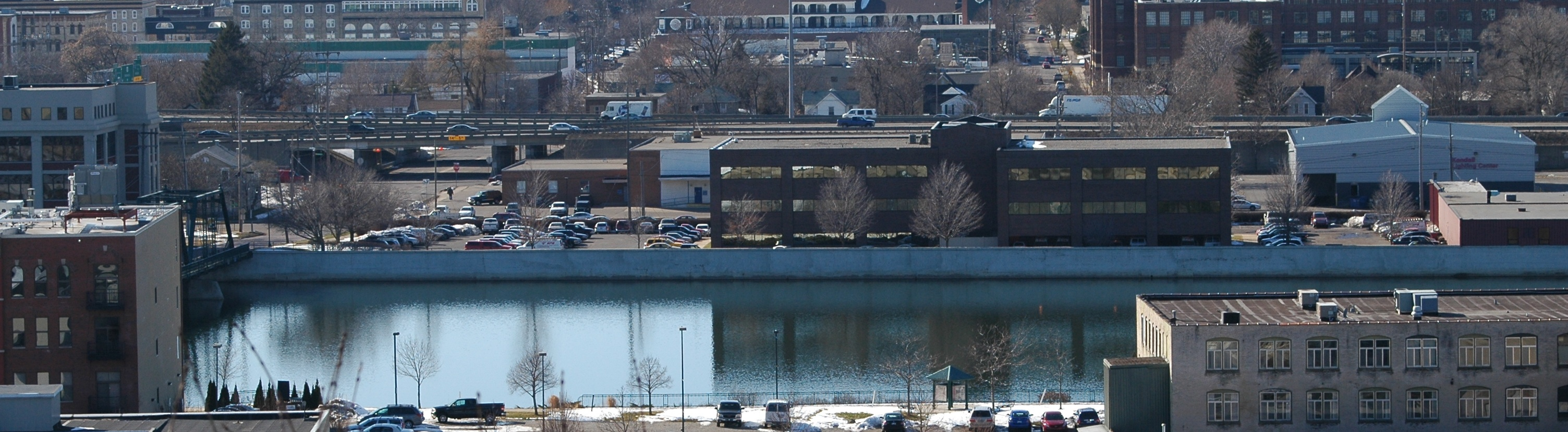
I-296/US 131 viewed from across the Grand River

== Exit list ==
The entire highway is in Kent County.

Location	mi	km	Exit (Note: Most of I-296 is concurrent with US 131 and uses the exit numbers of the latter.)	Destinations	Notes
Grand Rapids	0.000	0.000	86	I-196 (G.R. Ford Freeway) – Lansing, Holland US 131 south – Kalamazoo	Signed as exits 86A (east) and 86B (west); southern end of unsigned I-296 concurrency on US 131
Grand Rapids	0.815	1.312	87	Leonard Street	Previously Bus. US 131
Grand Rapids	1.566	2.520	88	Ann Street	
Walker	2.648	4.262	89	US 131 north – Cadillac	Northern end of US 131 concurrency; I-296 designation continues along the ramps between I-96 and US 131
Walker	2.957	4.759	89	I-96 east / M-37 south – Lansing	Northbound exit only
Walker	3.185	5.126	89	M-37 north (Alpine Avenue)	Secondary left exit northbound for M-37 north (Alpine Avenue)
Walker	3.393	5.461	89	I-96 west – Muskegon	Northbound exit and southbound entrance
1.000 mi = 1.609 km; 1.000 km = 0.621 mi: Concurrency terminus; Incomplete access
