= List of Interstate Highways in Michigan =

Interstate Highways of the State Trunkline Highway System
- Highway markers in different years for Interstate 69 (1957), Business Loop Interstate 75 (1957), Interstate 94 (1971), Business Spur Interstate 96 (1971) and the Capitol Loop (1989)
- Michigan's Interstates highlighted in red

System information
- Maintained by MDOT and MBA
- Length: 1,238.709 mi (1,993.509 km) Plus 197.816 mi (318.354 km) of business routes
- Formed: June 29, 1956

Highway names
- Interstates: Interstate nn (I‑nn)
- Business Loops: Business Loop Interstate nn (BL I‑nn)
- Business Spurs: Business Spur Interstate nn (BS I‑nn)

System links
- Michigan State Trunkline Highway System; Interstate; US; State; Byways

The Interstate Highways in Michigan are the segments of the national Dwight D. Eisenhower System of Interstate and Defense Highways that are owned and maintained by the U.S. state of Michigan, totaling about 1,239 miles (1,994 km). The longest of these, Interstate 75 (I-75), is also the longest highway of any kind in the state. On a national level, the standards and numbering for the system are handled by the Federal Highway Administration (FHWA) and the American Association of State Highway and Transportation Officials (AASHTO), while the highways in Michigan are maintained by the Michigan Department of Transportation (MDOT) and the Mackinac Bridge Authority (MBA). The Interstates in Michigan have their origins in World War II-era expressways built in the Detroit area. After the system was created in 1956, the state highway department completed its first border-to-border Interstate in 1960. The last highway was completed in 1992, giving Michigan a total of 13 Interstate freeways. The original allotment of mileage to Michigan which would receive federal funding was expanded in 1968, and the United States Congress designated an additional highway in the 1990s that has not yet been built.

There are also 26 current business routes that connect cities bypassed by the Interstates; 22 are business loops that connect on both ends to their parent highway, and four are business spurs that connect on only one end. I-496 had the Capitol Loop as its connection to the Michigan State Capitol in downtown Lansing. Another six business routes have been designated but are either no longer signed or maintained as state highways.

== Description ==
MDOT is the agency responsible for the day-to-day maintenance and operations of the State Trunkline Highway System, which includes the Interstate Highways in Michigan. These highways are built to Interstate Highway standards, meaning they are all freeways with minimum requirements for full control of access, design speeds of 50 to 70 miles per hour (80 to 113 km/h) depending on type of terrain, a minimum of two travel lanes in each direction, and specific widths of lanes or shoulders; exceptions from these standards have to be approved by the FHWA. The numbering scheme used to designate the Interstates was developed by AASHTO, an organization composed of the various state departments of transportation in the United States.

The Interstate Highway System covers about 1,240 miles (2,000 km) in the state and consists of four primary highways and nine auxiliary highways. There are additional 29 business routes associated with the system in Michigan. The longest segment of Interstate Highway in the state is Interstate 75 (I-75) at just under 396 miles (637 km); the shortest is I-375 at 1.1 miles (1.8 km). The length of I-75, the longest highway of any kind in the state, includes the Mackinac Bridge, which is maintained by the MBA, the only section of state highway not under MDOT jurisdiction. (Note: The Mackinac Bridge Authority (MBA) is an independent state agency responsible for the Mackinac Bridge and thus maintains that section of the overall highway system. The MBA works with MDOT but does not report to it. The executive secretary of the MBA is appointed by MDOT with MBA approval.) The Mackinac Bridge is one of three monumental bridges in the state used by I-75; the others are the Zilwaukee and International bridges. A fourth, the privately owned Ambassador Bridge connects I-75 and I-96 in Detroit to Canada.

== History ==
Construction of the first expressways in Michigan predates the Interstate Highway System. During World War II, the Michigan State Highway Department (MSHD) (Note: The Michigan State Highway Department was reorganized into the Michigan Department of State Highways and Transportation on August 23, 1973, and the name was later shortened to its current form in 1978.) built the Willow Run and Detroit Industrial expressways (now part of I-94) to carry workers from Detroit to the defense plants at Willow Run Airport. The state created the Michigan Turnpike Authority (MTA) in 1951, which proposed the construction of a toll freeway to run north–south in the state. The original termini for the Michigan Turnpike were Bridgeport and Rockwood. Interagency politics stalled progress on any proposed turnpikes while MSHD had three freeways under planning or construction.

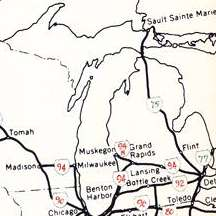
1958 planning map for Michigan's Interstate Highways

The Interstate Highway System was authorized by the Federal Aid Highway Act of 1956, and the state had already designed several freeways for its portion of that system. Seizing the opportunity brought by a 1957 state law, the department sold $700 million in bonds (equivalent to $5.96 billion in 2011) in the late 1950s and early 1960s to finance land purchases and construction of the new freeways. The goal was to connect every city with a population over 50,000 with four-lane freeways that could accommodate rural traffic traveling at 70 mph (110 km/h). The MSHD delayed numbering these freeways as part of the Interstate Highway System until the federal government had finalized the designations to be assigned to Michigan's freeways. The first highway to be signed as an Interstate in Michigan was I-75, which received signage in late 1959, along a section near the Ohio state line that opened to traffic in October 1957. I-94 was the first of the Interstates to be completed border to border in a US state. In 1974, the state implemented mileage-based exit numbers along the Interstates in Michigan.

The MSHD asked for 600 miles (970 km) in additions to the state's Interstate mileage in 1968. Included in these requests were the extension of the Davison Freeway (now M-8), the extension of I-69 from Marshall to Port Huron, and the conversion of the northern sections of US Highway 23 (US 23) and US 131. Of these, the I-69 proposal was approved when the United States Congress extended it to terminate in at I-75 in Flint. The highway was lengthened twice more: to I-475 in 1973 and to Port Huron on February 10, 1987. These last two extensions were classified non-chargeable mileage, or segments not financed through the Interstate Highway fund. The federal government paid 90 percent of the cost of the chargeable mileage originally approved.

The last of Michigan's Interstates to be completed was I-69, the last segment of which opened in 1992. Since then, the United States Congress has designated an additional primary Interstate, I-73 in the state. All studies by MDOT on that highway were cancelled in 2001 over funding concerns. Press reports state there is a "lack of need" for the freeway in the state, and the department has no plans to revive I-73 as of 2011. If built as designated, I-73 would cross into Michigan near Toledo, Ohio, and connect Jackson, Lansing, and Clare to I-75 at Grayling.

== Primary Interstates ==
Number	Length (mi)	Length (km)	Southern or western terminus	Northern or eastern terminus	Formed	Removed	Notes
I-69	202.317	325.598	I-69 at Kinderhook Township	Hwy. 402 at Port Huron	1967	current	Last Interstate completed in Michigan when finished in 1992; segments named the Chevrolet (or Chevrolet-Buick) Freeway, or the Pearl Harbor or Purple Heart highways
I-75	395.916	637.165	I-75 at Erie Township	International Bridge at Sault Ste. Marie	1959	current	I-75 is the longest highway of any kind in Michigan and the only highway on both of the Upper & Lower peninsulas. It is the only freeway in the Upper Peninsula and was completed in 1973. Segments are named the Detroit–Toledo, Fisher, Chrysler, American Legion, Prentiss M. Brown and G. Mennon Williams freeways
I-94	275.398	443.210	I-94 at New Buffalo Township	Hwy. 402 at Port Huron	1959	current	First Interstate Highway completed between state borders in 1960; sections named the Detroit Industrial or Edsel Ford freeways
I-96	192.032	309.046	US 31 & Bus. US 31 in Norton Shores	I-75 in Detroit	1959	current	One section previously known as the Brighton–Farmington Freeway, other sections named the Jeffries and Rosa Parks freeways; completed in 1977

Primary Interstates

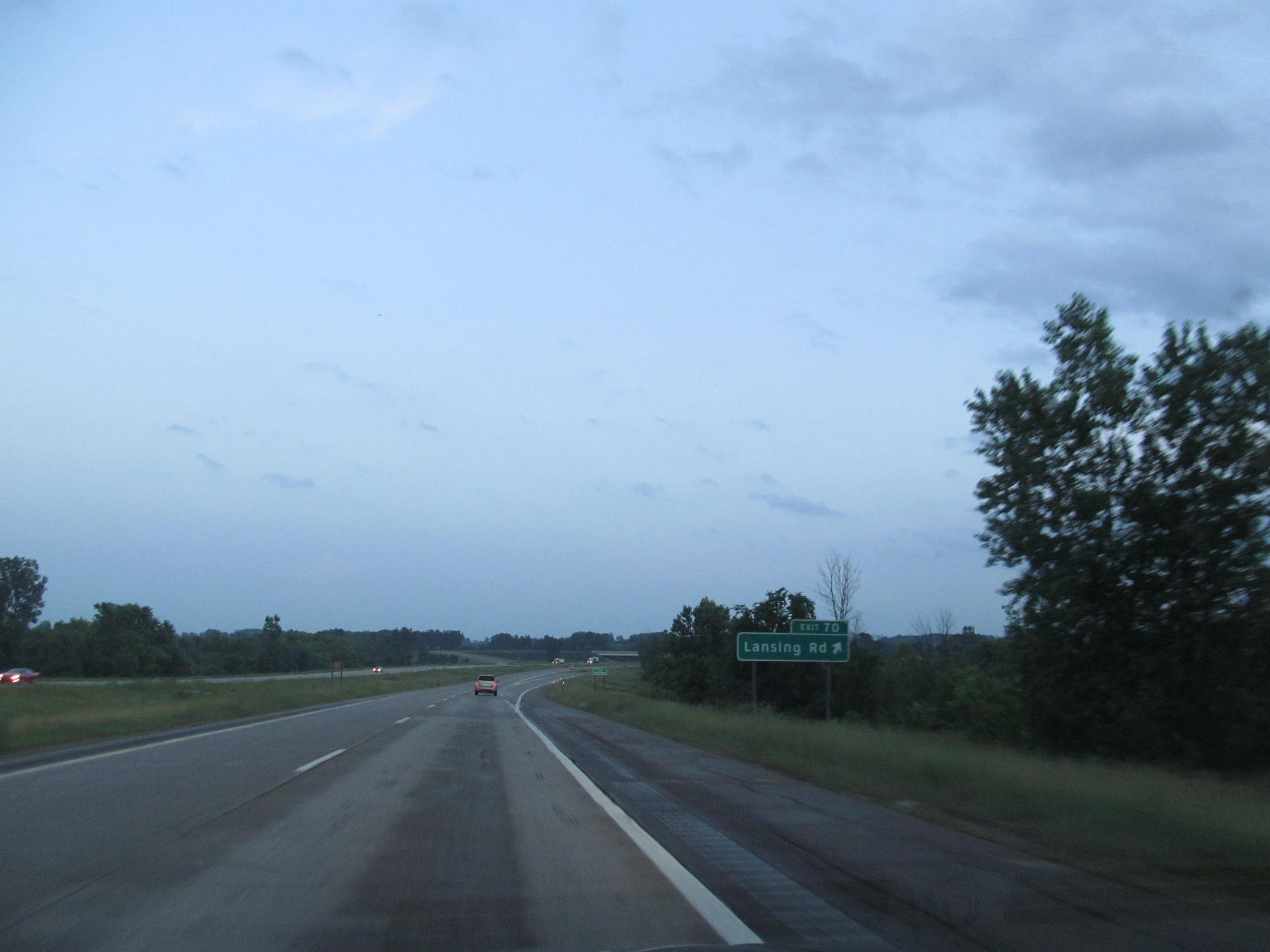
I-69 approaching exit 70

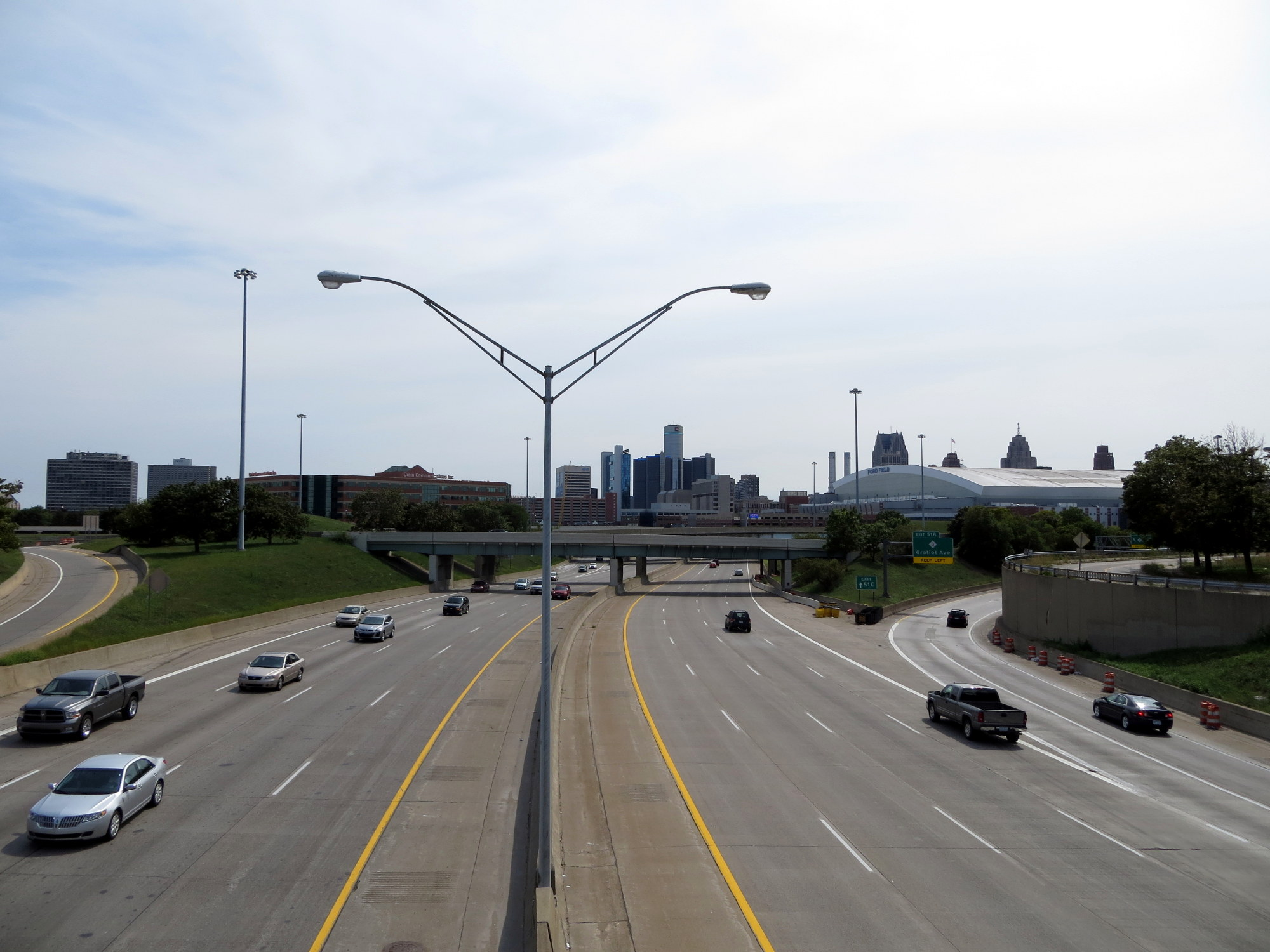
Looking south along I-75 (Chrysler Freeway) at the Detroit skyline

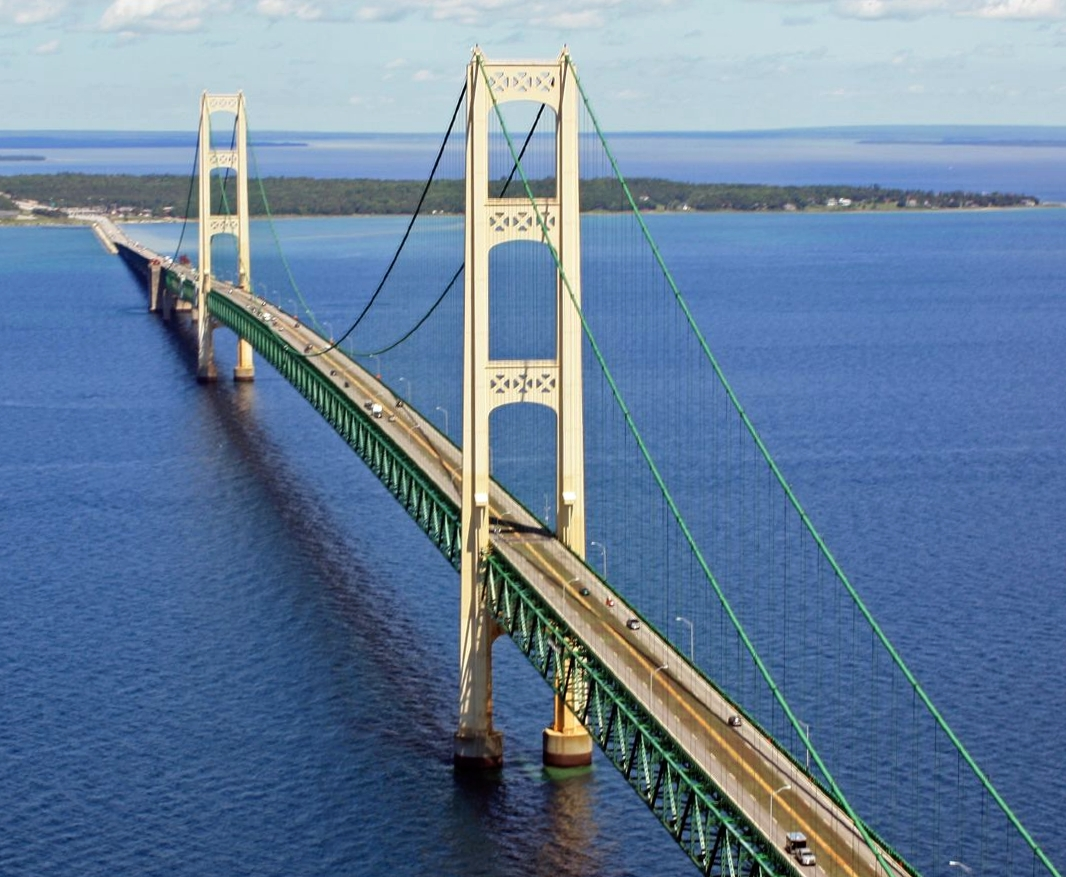
Mackinac Bridge and I-75 over the Straits of Mackinac

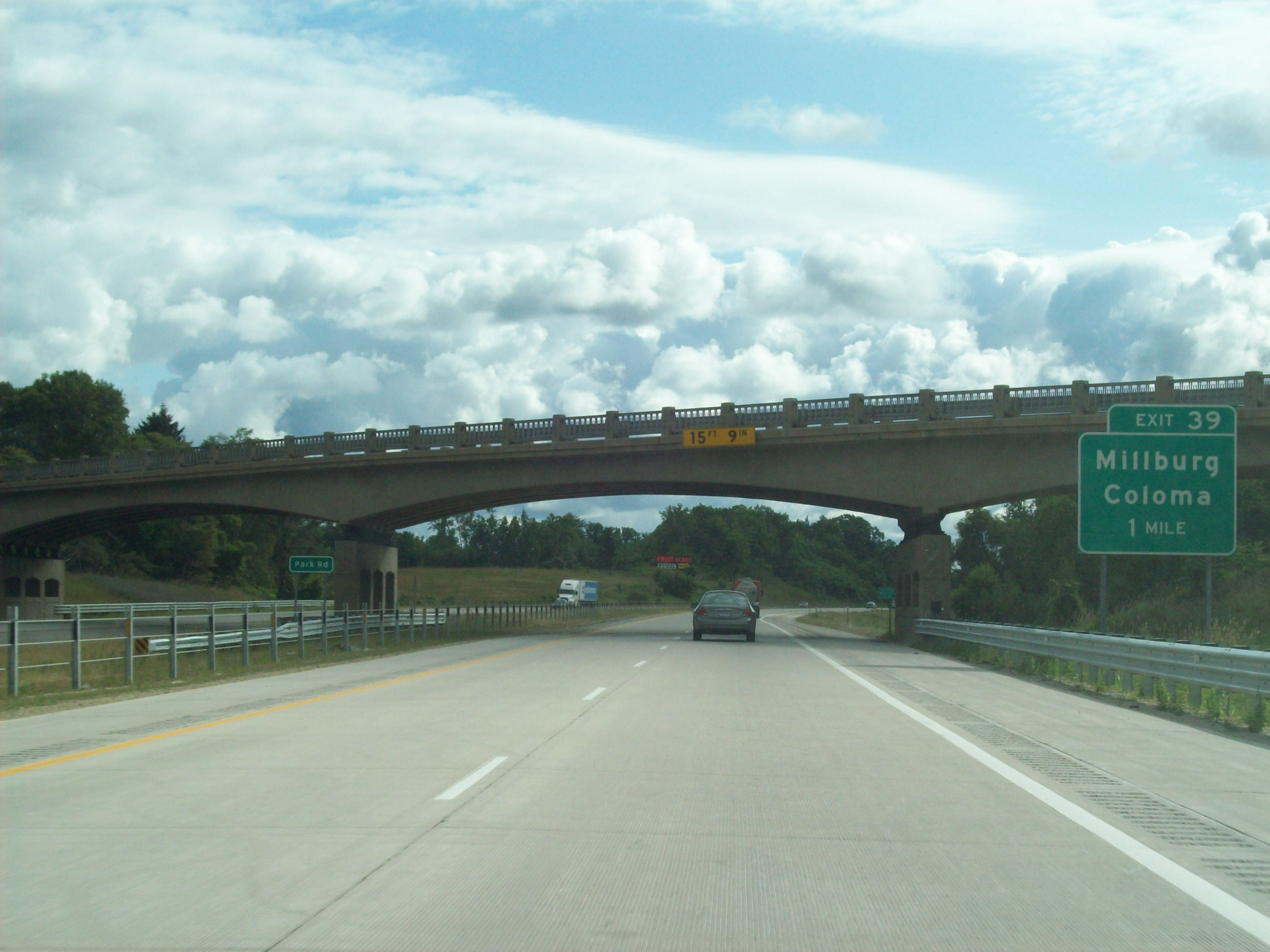
I-94 at Park Road near Coloma

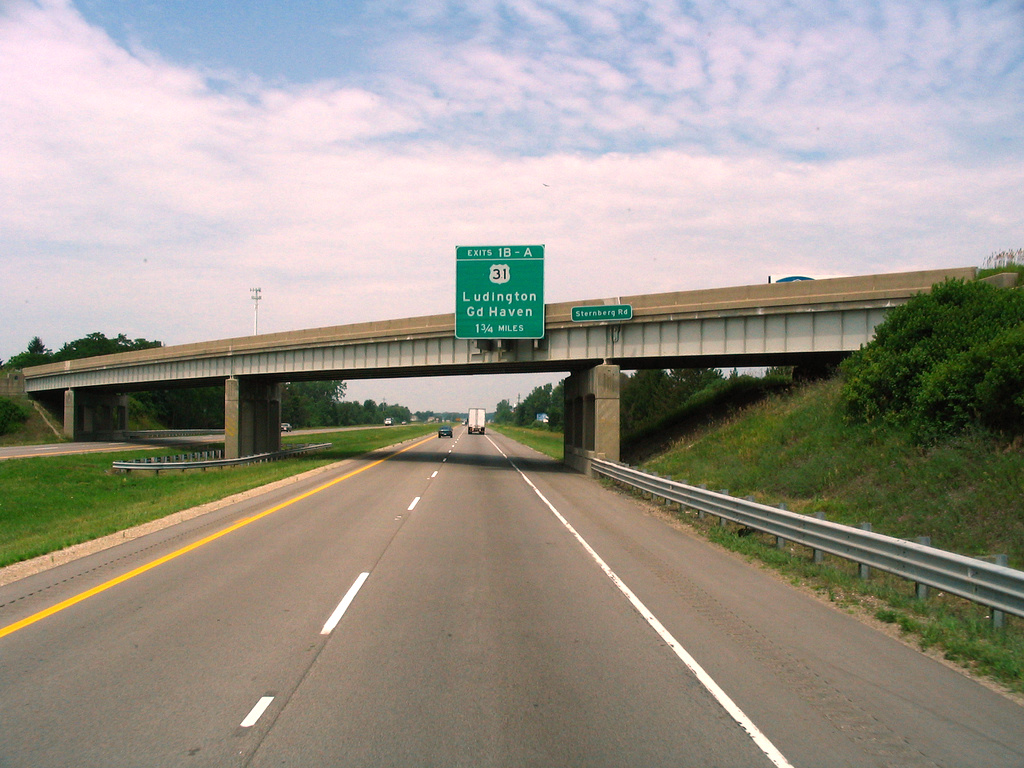
I-96 near its western terminus

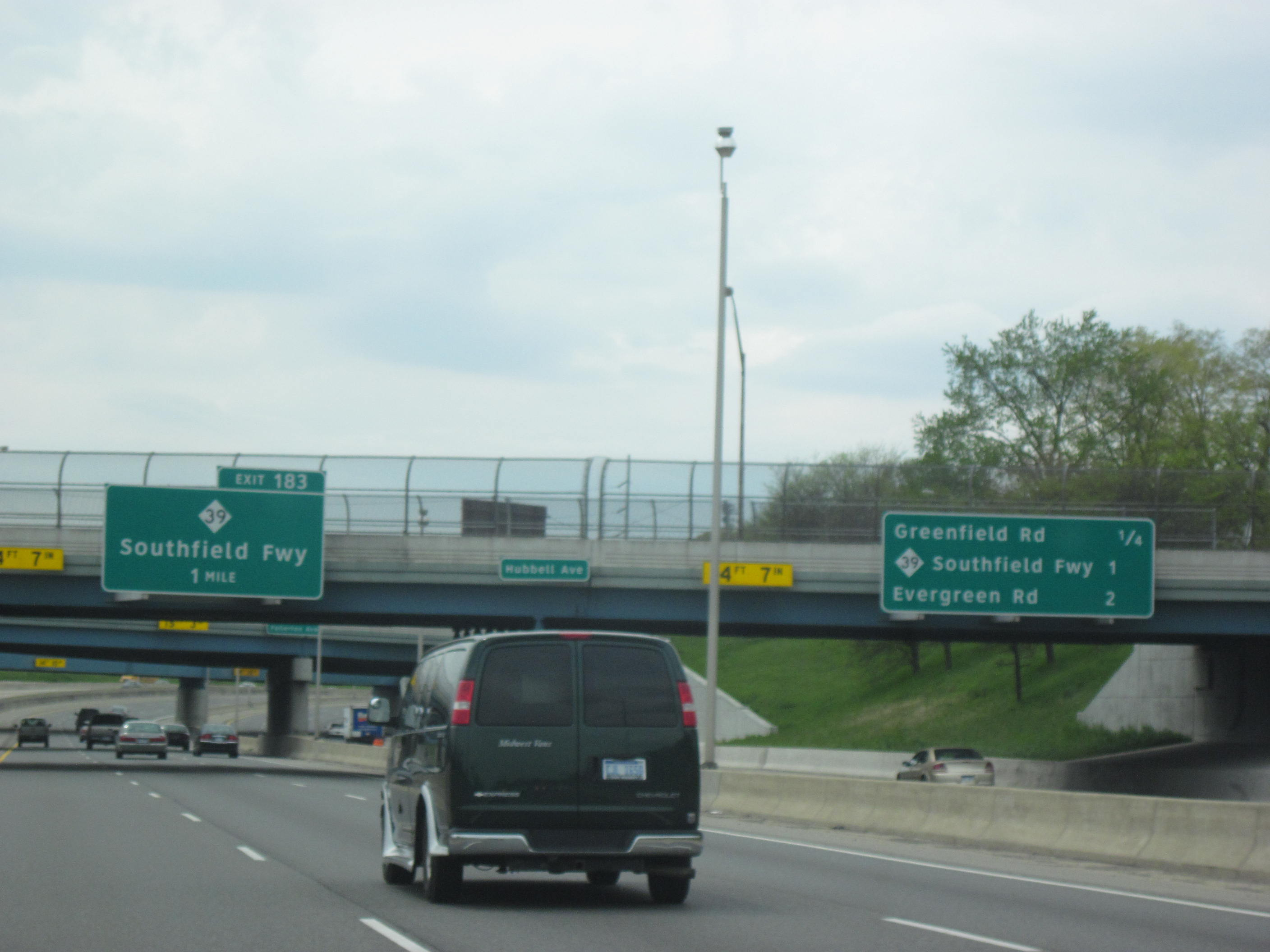
Local-express lanes along I-96 (Jeffries Freeway)

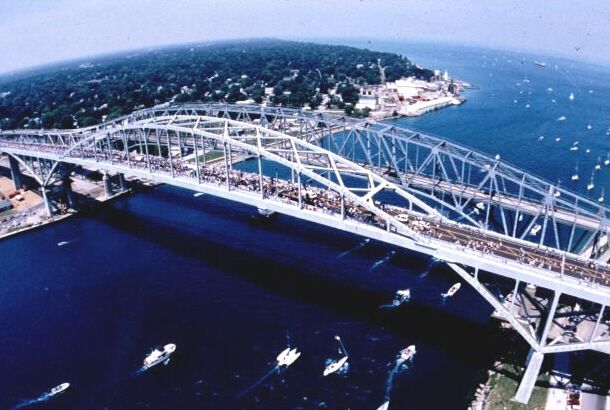
Twin-span Blue Water Bridge carrying I-69 and I-94

== Auxiliary Interstates ==
Number	Length (mi)	Length (km)	Southern or western terminus	Northern or eastern terminus	Formed	Removed	Notes
I-194	3.374	5.430	I-94 and M-66 in Battle Creek	M-66 in Battle Creek	1961	current	Called the Sojourner Truth Downtown Parkway, or The Penetrator, (Note: When the MSHD was planning the freeway network in the state, they called all of the auxiliary Interstate Highways, "Penetrator") I-194 serves as a spur into downtown Battle Creek and was completed in 1966.
I-196	30.073	48.398	US 31 and BS I-196/Bus. US 31 in Norton Shores	I-96 in Grand Rapids	1959	1963	Now the western end of I-96, I-196 was a spur from Grand Rapids to Muskegon completed in 1962.
I-196	80.629	129.760	I-94/US 31 in Benton Township near Benton Harbor	I-96/M-37 in Grand Rapids	1963	current	The Gerald R. Ford Freeway was completed in 1974 as a connector from Grand Rapids to I-94 in the Benton Harbor–St. Joseph area.
I-275	35.026	56.369	I-75 in Frenchtown Township near Newport	I-96, I-696 and M-5 in Novi	1974	current	Completed in 1977 as a partial western bypass of Detroit.
I-296	3.189	5.132	I-196 and US 131 in Grand Rapids	I-96 in Walker	1962	current	Michigan was granted approval to remove signage referring to I-296 on December 3, 1979. The freeway is signed as US 131 and connects I-96 and I-196 near downtown Grand Rapids.
I-375	1.147	1.846	BS I-375 in Detroit	I-75 in Detroit	1964	current	I-375 is the southern end of the Walter P. Chrysler Freeway, and as of 2007 it was the shortest signed Interstate in the country, but I-110 in Texas has been signed since then. I-375 is a spur connecting the Detroit Riverfront area to I-75.
I-475	16.866	27.143	I-75 in Grand Blanc Township	I-75/US 23 in Mount Morris Township	1973	current	Called the David Dunbar Buick Freeway, or the UAW Freeway, I-475 is a loop into Downtown Flint completed in 1981.
I-496	11.481	18.477	I-96/I-69 in Delta Township	I-96 and US 127 in Delhi Township	1963	current	I-496 is the R. E. Olds Freeway, a loop into Downtown Lansing completed in 1970
I-675	7.929	12.760	I-75/US 23 in Buena Vista Township	I-75/US 23 in Zilwaukee Township	1971	current	I-675 is a loop into downtown Saginaw.
I-696	28.368	45.654	I-96/I-275 and M-5 in Novi	I-94 in St. Clair Shores	1963	current	Walter P. Reuther Freeway; completed in 1989
Former

Auxiliary Interstates

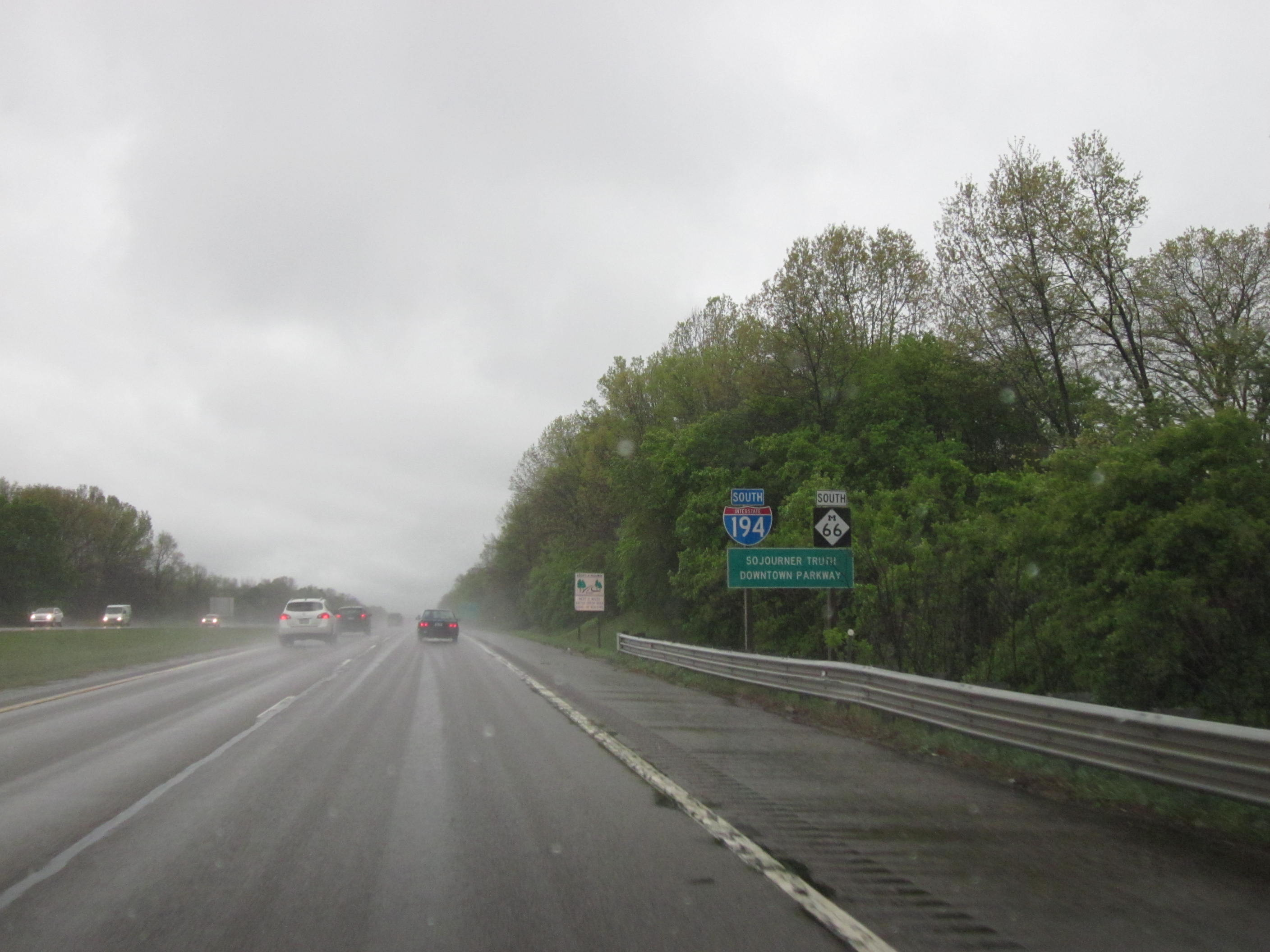
I-194/M-66, the Sojourner Truth Downtown Parkway

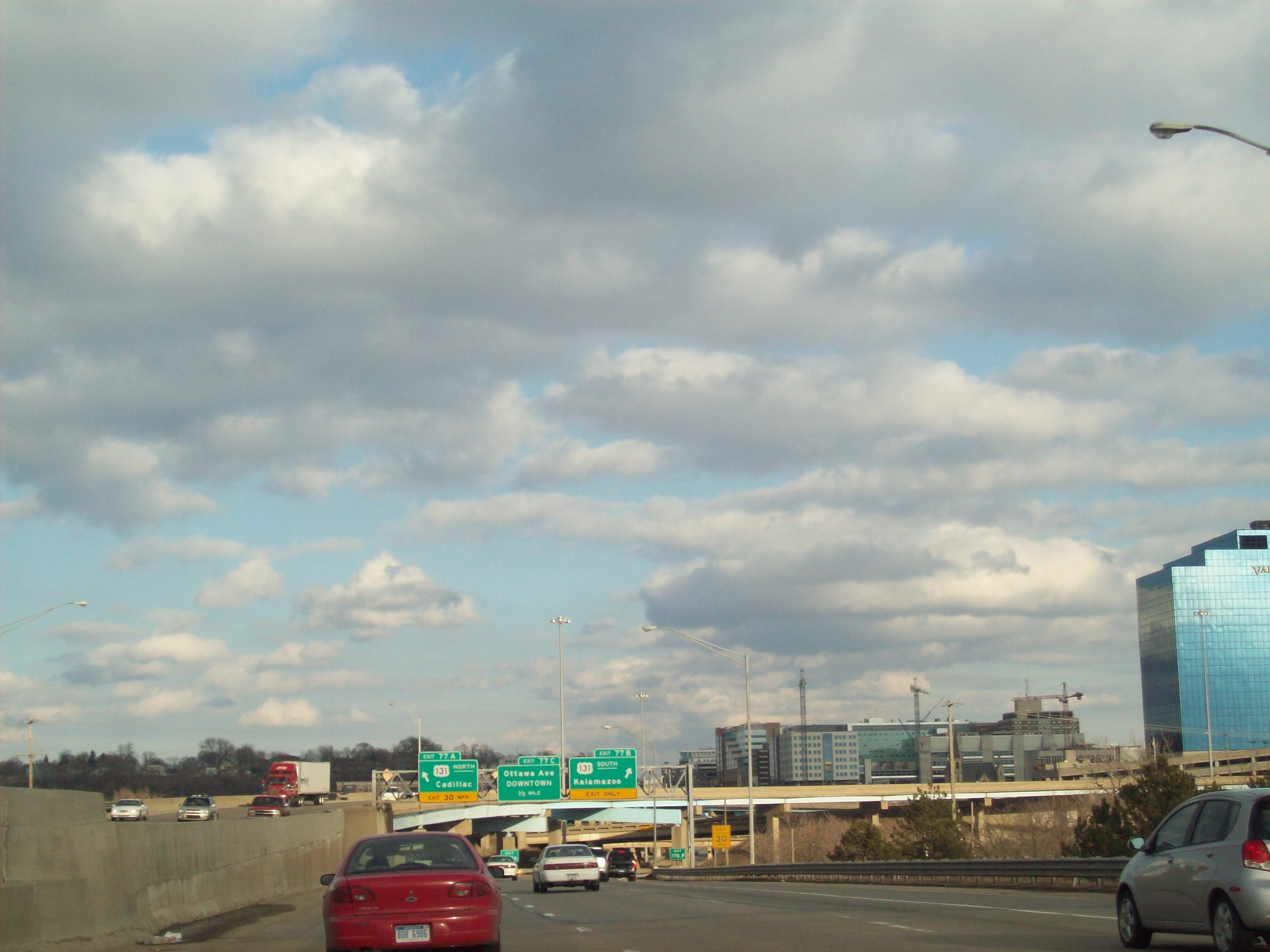
I-196 entering downtown Grand Rapids

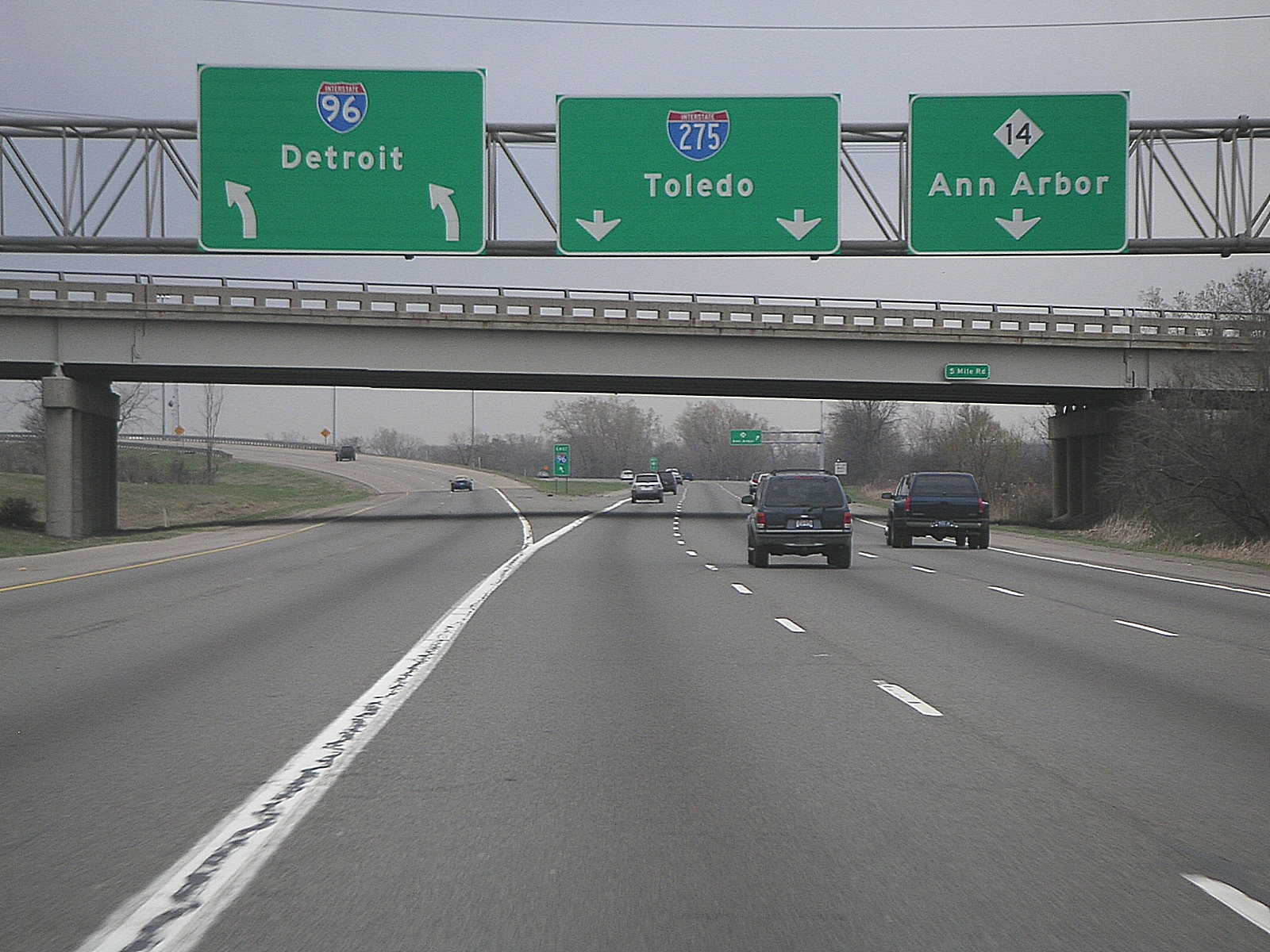
Looking south at the I-96/I-275 split

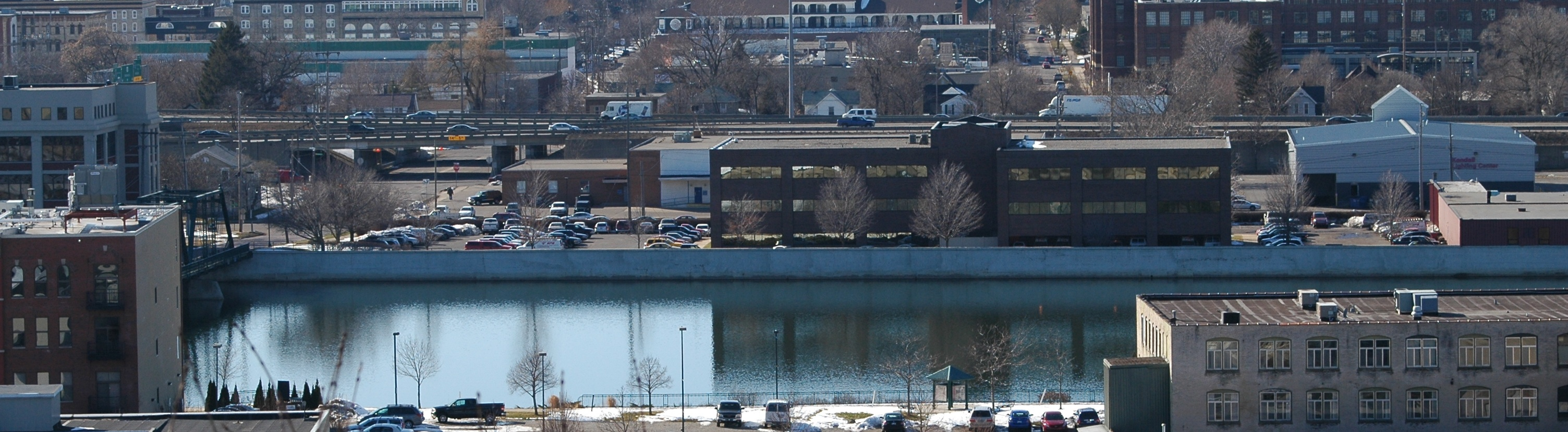
Unsigned I-296 from across the Grand River

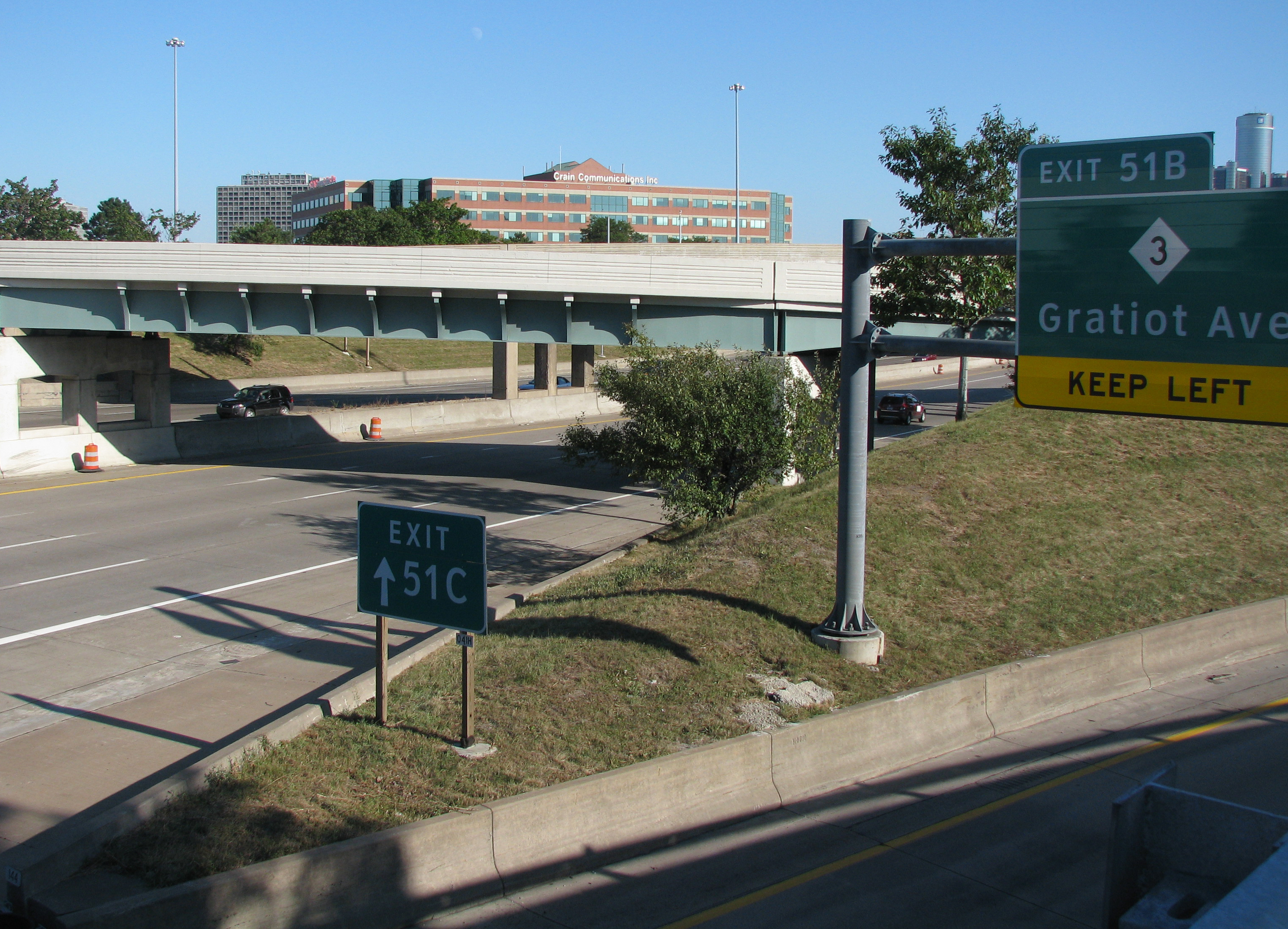
Northern end of I-375 where it merges into I-75 near Gratiot Avenue in Detroit

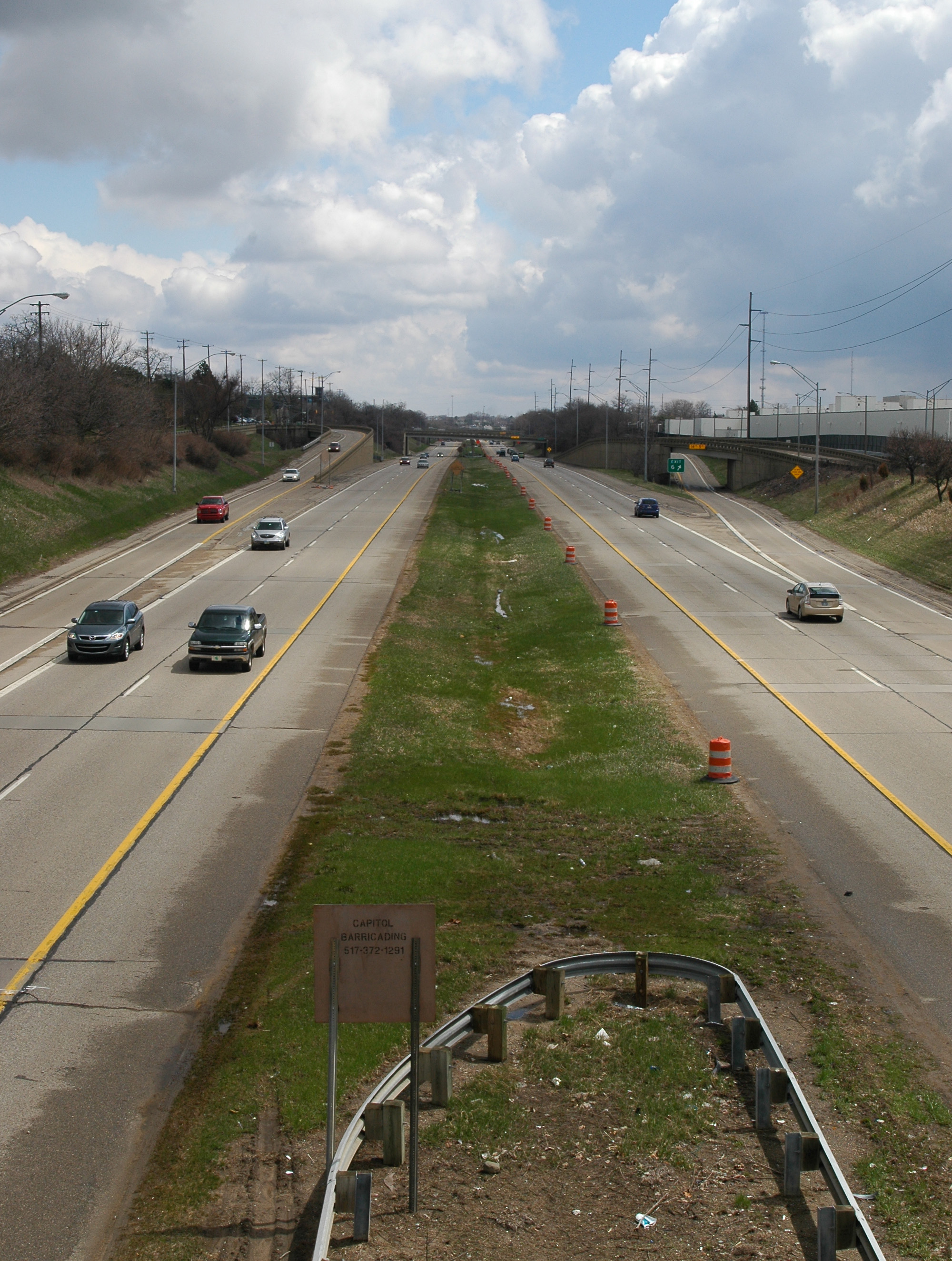
I-496 in Lansing

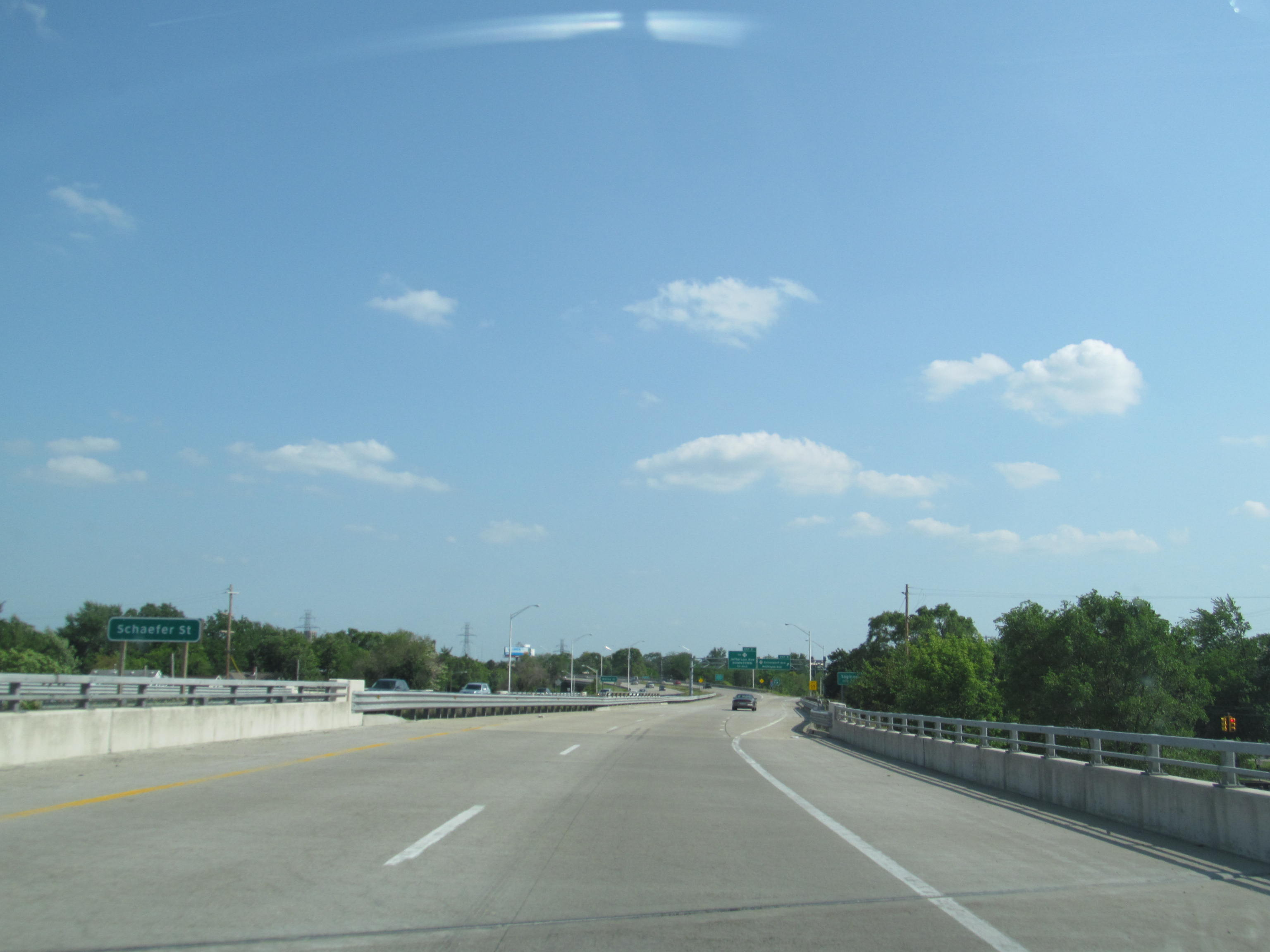
I-675 crossing Schaefer Street in Saginaw

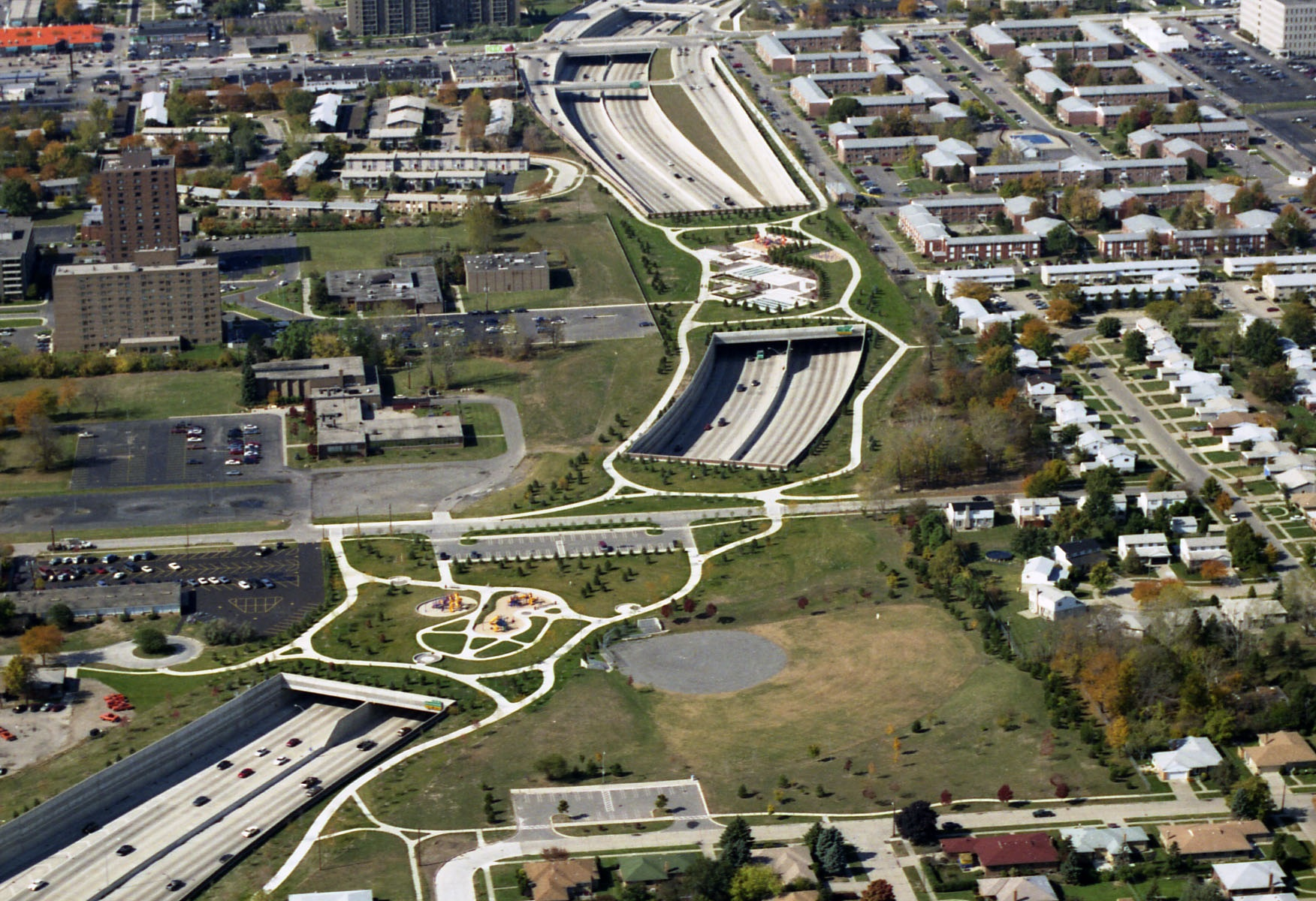
Pedestrian plazas along I-696 in Oak Park

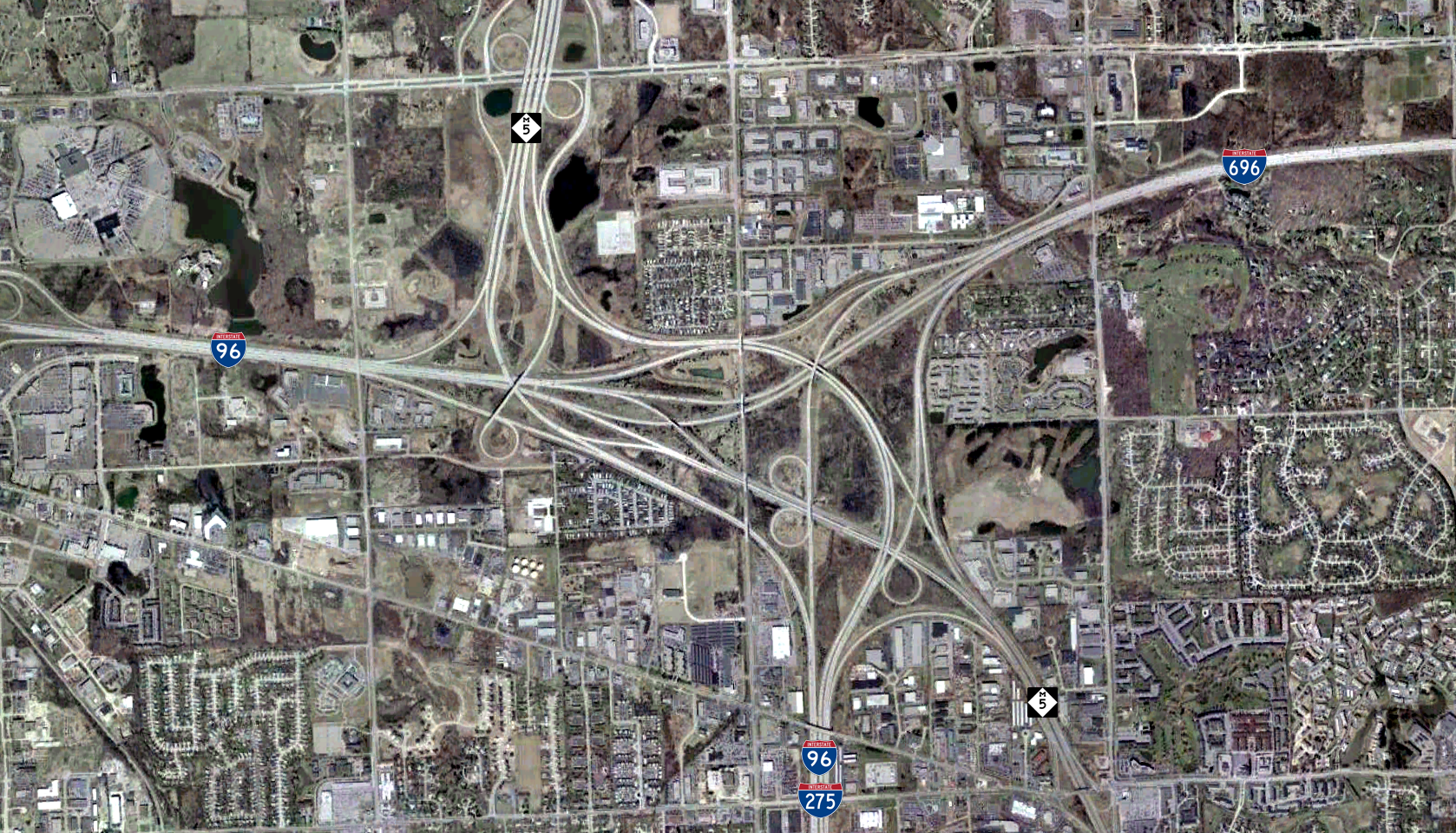
Satellite image of the junction of I-96, I-275 and I-696

== Proposed Interstates ==
Number	Southern or western terminus	Northern or eastern terminus	Notes
I-67	South Bend, IN	Kalamazoo	Proposed designation in 1957 for what was shifted to become I-69
I-67	Benton Harbor	Grand Rapids	Later proposed in 1958 and 1963 for what became I-196
I-73	Newport	Novi	Proposed in 1958 for what became I-275
I-73	Ottawa Lake	Grayling (Note: The legislation defining the I-73 corridor specifies Sault Ste. Marie and Detroit as the northern termini, but the Grayling–Sault Ste. Marie or Toledo–Detroit segments overlap I-75 with no requirement to overlap the highway designations. Similarly, Congress included I-94 between Chicago and Port Huron in the I-69 corridor to make it eligible for funding.)	Designated by Congress in 1991 and 1995, but all future study halted by MDOT; essentially removed from consideration
I-77	Erie	Port Huron	Proposed designation in 1957 for what became I-94 from Detroit to Port Huron and cosigned with I-75 from Detroit to state line
I-92	Benton Harbor	Detroit	Proposed designation in 1957 for what became I-94 from Detroit to Benton Harbor
I-94N	Muskegon	Grand Rapids	Proposed designation in 1957 for what became I-196, and now I-96 from Grand Rapids to Muskegon
I-98	Novi	St. Clair Shores	Proposed designation in 1958 for what became I-696
—	Grand Rapids	Mackinaw City	Request from 1968 for a designation along US 131
—	Standish	Cheboygan	Request from 1968 for a designation along US 23

== Business routes ==
Number	Length (mi)	Length (km)	Southern or western terminus	Northern or eastern terminus	Formed	Removed	Notes
BL I-69	5.202	8.372	I-69 on the Ovid–Coldwater township line	I-69 in Coldwater	1967	current	
BL I-69	4.891	7.871	I-69 on the Carmel–Eaton township line	I-69 in Charlotte	1974	current	
BL I-69	14.668	23.606	I-96/I-69 and M-43 in Delta Township	I-69 in Bath Township	1987	current	Longest business route in the state, serves Lansing and East Lansing
BL I-69	5.408	8.703	I-94/I-69 in Port Huron Township	I-94/I-69 in Port Huron	1984	current	
BL I-75	8.384	13.493	I-75 in Bloomfield Township	I-75 in Auburn Hills	1963	current	Follows Woodward Avenue through downtown Pontiac
BL I-75	7.338	11.809	I-75/US 10/US 23 in Buena Vista Township	I-75/US 10/US 23 in Zilwaukee Township	1961	1971	Previously served downtown Saginaw
BS I-75	3.047	4.904	I-75/US 23 and US 10 in Monitor Township	M-25 in Bay City	1961	current	Previously part of a business loop
BL I-75	5.525	8.892	I-75 in Horton Township	I-75/M-55 in Ogemaw Township	1973	current	Replaced Bus. M-76 through West Branch
BL I-75	6.935	11.161	I-75 and M-18 in Higgins Township	I-75 on the Gerrish–Beaver Creek township line	1973	current	Serves Roscommon
BL I-75	5.823	9.371	I-75 in Grayling Township	I-75 and M-93 in Grayling Township	1961	current	Serves Grayling
BL I-75	3.391	5.457	I-75 in Bagley Township	I-75 and M-32 in Gaylord	1986	current	
BL I-75	3.975	6.397	I-75 and M-68 in Tuscarora Township	I-75 and M-27 in Tuscarora Township	proposed	—	Would serve Indian River if designated
BL I-75	4.719	7.594	I-75 and US 2 in St. Ignace	I-75 and H-63 in Evergreen Shores	c. 1960	current	
BS I-75	5.867	9.442	I-75 in Sault Ste. Marie	Portage Avenue in Sault Ste. Marie	1962	current	
BL I-94	10.705	17.228	I-94 in Lincoln Township	I-94/US 31 in Benton Township	1960	current	Serves Benton Harbor and St. Joseph
BS I-94	2.885	4.643	M-96 in Kalamazoo	I-94 in Comstock Township	1962	current	Previously a full business loop, truncated in 2019 after Kalamazoo accepted jurisdiction of much of the routing; some portions retained as unsigned highway
BL I-94	14.052	22.615	I-94 in Battle Creek	I-94 and M-96 in Emmett Township	1962	current	
BL I-94	5.707	9.185	I-94 and I-69 in Marshall Township	I-94 in Marengo Township	1962	current	Serves Marshall
BL I-94	4.520	7.274	I-94 in Sheridan Township	I-94 in Parma Township	1962	current	Serves Albion
BL I-94	10.274	16.534	I-94 in Blackman Township	I-94 in Leoni Township	1962	current	Serves Jackson
BL I-94	8.436	13.576	I-94 in Ann Arbor	I-94 and US 23 in Pittsfield Township	1962	current	
BL I-94	8.536	13.737	I-94 in Kimball Township	I-94/I-69 in Port Huron	1986	current	
BS I-96	6.160	9.914	Carferry docks in Muskegon	I-96, US 31 and Bus. US 31 in Norton Shores	1963	1984	Replaced BS I-196
BS I-96	1.292	2.079	Grand River Avenue in Portland	I-96 in Portland	1978	2007	
BL I-96	13.545	21.799	I-96 in Watertown Township	I-96 in Lansing	1962	current	
BL I-96	5.415	8.715	I-96 in Howell Township	I-96 in Genoa Township	1962	current	Serves Howell
BL I-96	4.365	7.025	M-5 in Farmington Hills	M-5 in Farmington Hills	1962	current	Now an unsigned highway along Grand River Avenue serving Farmington
BS I-96	7.033	11.319	I-96 and M-5 in Detroit	Cass and Grand River avenues in Detroit	1962	2016	Was last an unsigned trunkline along Grand River Avenue in Detroit, replaced by an extension of M-5
BS I-196	6.160	9.914	Carferry docks in Muskegon	I-196, US 31 and Bus. US 31 in Norton Shores	1962	1963	Replaced by BS I-96
BL I-196	3.572	5.749	I-196/US 31 and M-140 in South Haven Township	I-196/US 31 in South Haven	1963	current	
BL I-196	11.508	18.520	I-196/US 31 in Laketown Township	I-196 in Zeeland Township	1974	current	Serves Holland
BS I-196	2.433	3.916	I-196 in Wyoming	Granville Avenue & Clyde Park Avenue on the Wyoming–Grand Rapids city line	1974	current	Previously extended into Grand Rapids and terminated at US 131 before December 2017
BS I-375	0.167	0.269	M-3 and M-10 in Detroit	I-375 in Detroit	1963	current	Unsigned along Jefferson Avenue (Note: The section of Jefferson Avenue that connects I-375 with M-10 is combined with the freeway as I-375 on MDOT right-of-way (ROW) maps that document property transfers and ROW descriptions, but in the department's Physical Reference Finder Application, the street is marked as BS I-375, a designation missing from the official state map for the public.)
Capitol Loop	2.381	3.832	I-496 and M-99 in Lansing	I-496 and BL I-96 in Lansing	1989	2024	Also designated Connector 496 or Capitol Loop I-496 by MDOT
BS I-696	18.562	29.873	I-696 and US 24 in Southfield	Jefferson Avenue in Detroit	c. 1961	1970	Previous designation for the John C. Lodge Freeway, now M-10
Former; Proposed and unbuilt
