= Interstate 194 (Michigan) =

Interstate Highway in Michigan

Interstate 194
- Sojourner Truth Downtown Parkway; The Penetrator
- I-194 highlighted in red

Route information
- Auxiliary route of I-94
- Maintained by MDOT
- Length: 3.374 mi (5.430 km)
- Existed: 1961–present
- NHS: Entire route

Major junctions
- South end: I-94 / M-66 in Battle Creek
- M-96 in Battle Creek; BL I-94 in Battle Creek
- North end: M-66 / Hamblin Avenue in Battle Creek

Location
- Country: United States
- State: Michigan
- Counties: Calhoun

Highway system
- Interstate Highway System; Main; Auxiliary; Suffixed; Business; Future; Michigan State Trunkline Highway System; Interstate; US; State; Byways
← M-193	→ M-194

Interstate 194 (I-194) is a 3.4-mile-long (5.5 km), north–south auxiliary Interstate Highway between downtown Battle Creek and I-94 in the southern portion of the city. The highway has been designated the Sojourner Truth Downtown Parkway by the state after the abolitionist Sojourner Truth, who was active in the Battle Creek area. Locals refer to the freeway by its semi-official nickname, "The Penetrator". I-194 is the only three-digit spur or loop route off I-94 in the state of Michigan and runs concurrently throughout its length with M-66, which continues both north and south from the termini of I-194. The freeway was initially opened in 1961 and completed in its current form in 1966. The highway was named in 1976 for Truth in honor of her local connections to the area.

== Route description ==
Part of the much longer highway, I-194 starts when M-66 widens out to a full freeway just south of I-94 near Beckley Road. The start of I-194 is marked by the full cloverleaf interchange. It is numbered as exit 98 along I-94 and exit 1 using I-194's mileage along the I-194/M-66 freeway. The roadway crosses Minges Creek north of the I-94 interchange. To the west of the freeway are residential subdivisions; the eastern side is marked by gently-rolling, wooded terrain. This section of I-194 carries 26,300 vehicles on average day according to surveys done by the Michigan Department of Transportation (MDOT) in 2007. Of these vehicles, 1,200 trucks were included in the totals.

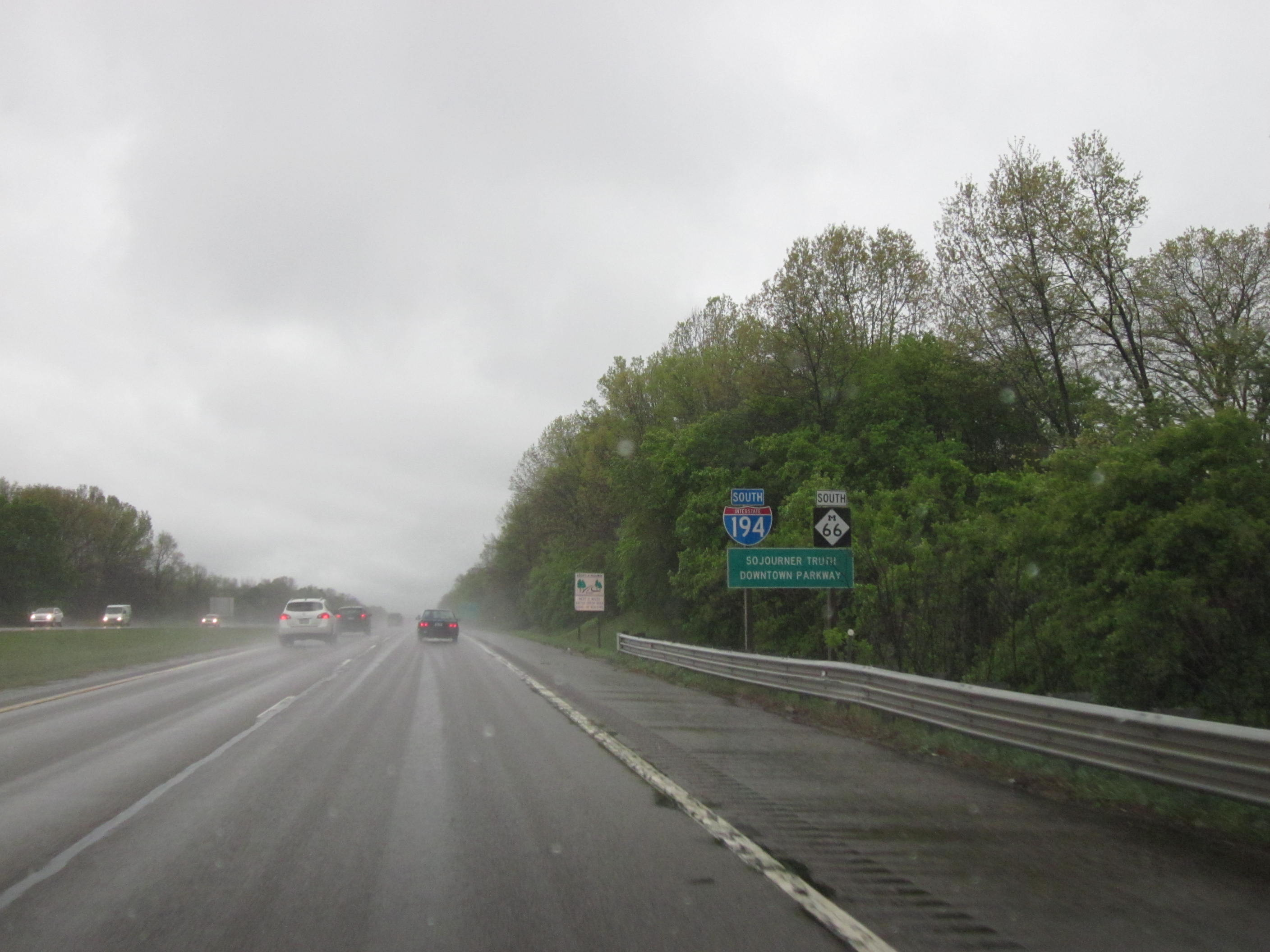
Signage for I-194/M-66, the Sojourner Truth Downtown Parkway

After crossing Golden Avenue, I-194 curves to the northwest to meet the M-96 (Columbia Avenue) interchange. The freeway runs underneath the Columbia Avenue overpass before running parallel to the west bank of the Kalamazoo River. The freeway crosses the river at the southern end of Lower Mill Pond. Curving back around to the northeast, I-194 meets Business Loop I-94 (BL I-94, Dickman Road). Here the traffic averages 24,400 vehicles a day. The freeway ends at an at-grade intersection with Hamblin Avenue, and continuing north of the intersection, the highway becomes just M-66. BL I-94 runs east of the freeway end on Hamblin Avenue to connect to Michigan Avenue. All of I-194 is listed on the National Highway System, a system of strategically important highways, and it is concurrent with M-66 for the length of the freeway.

== History ==
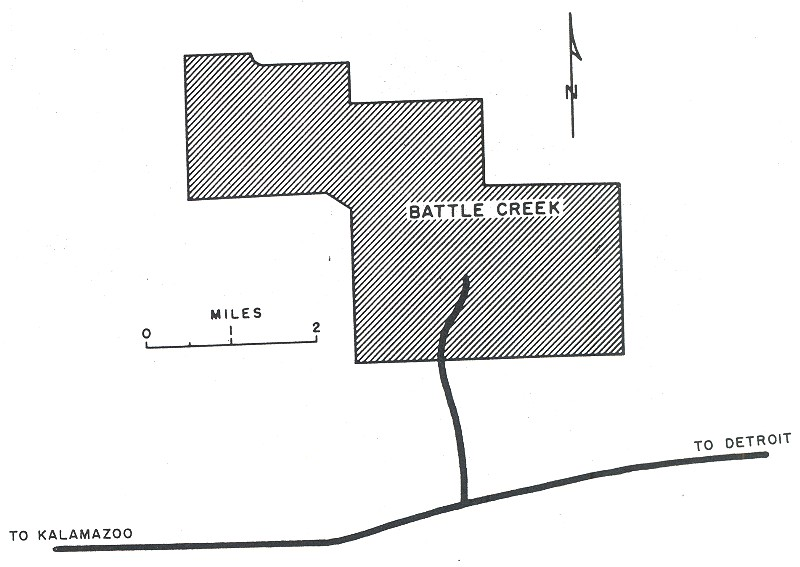
Planning map for Interstate freeways in Battle Creek

From its initial opening in 1961 until 1964, I-194 also carried the BL I-94 and M-78 designations. BL I-94 was rerouted in Battle Creek to Martin Luther King Drive and M-78 in 1964, and M-78 was replaced by M-66 in 1965. The last change to the I-194 routing was the extension of the northern end of the freeway from Columbia Avenue to Michigan Avenue in 1966. At the time, MDOT's predecessor, the Michigan State Highway Department, called all auxiliary Interstate Highways "Penetrator" when planning the freeway network in the state; a name which stuck to I-194.

Born Isabella Baumfree in 1797, Sojourner Truth settled in the Battle Creek area in the 1840s. She travelled through the Midwest and New England speaking against slavery and for women's rights. She lived in the area until her death in 1883. Her connection to the state of Michigan was honored by the state American Revolution Bicentennial Commission in 1976 which urged the Michigan Legislature to name a highway in her honor. Public Act 93 of 1976 named all of M-66 in Calhoun County as the Sojourner Truth Memorial Highway. The highway was dedicated to her on May 21, 1976.

The Cereal City Development Corporation (CCDC) asked the Legislature to amend the memorial designation in 1993. They felt the highway was better known to locals as The Penetrator, and they wished to restore emphasis to Truth, they asked for the "Sojourner Truth Downtown Parkway" name to be applied to "M-66 between Interstate 94 and Hamblin". The Legislature passed Public Act 208 of 1993 to affect the change, restoring "the link between Sojourner Truth and the City of Battle Creek, which was once the center of abolitionist sentiment in the state".

== Exit list ==
The entire highway is in Battle Creek, Calhoun County.

mi	km	Exit	Destinations	Notes
0.000	0.000	1	I-94 – Detroit, Chicago M-66 south – Sturgis	Southern end of M-66 concurrency; signed as exits 1A (east) and 1B (west); I-94 exit 98B
2.048	3.296	2	M-96 (East Columbia Avenue)	
3.161	5.087	3	BL I-94 (Dickman Road)	
3.374	5.430		Hamblin Avenue M-66 north – Ionia	Northern end of M-66 concurrency; at-grade intersection
1.000 mi = 1.609 km; 1.000 km = 0.621 mi: Concurrency terminus
