= Emmett Charter Township, Michigan =

Emmett Township, Michigan
- Charter township
- Charter Township of Emmett
- Location within the state of Michigan Location within the United States
- Coordinates: 42°17′50″N 85°08′15″W
- Country: United States
- State: Michigan
- County: Calhoun

Area
  - Total: 32.5 sq mi (84.2 km^{2})
  - Land: 32.0 sq mi (82.9 km^{2})
  - Water: 0.50 sq mi (1.3 km^{2})
- Elevation: 889 ft (271 m)

Population (2020)
  - Total: 11,744
  - Density: 367/sq mi (142/km^{2})
- Time zone: UTC-5 (Eastern (EST))
  - Summer (DST): UTC-4 (EDT)
- FIPS code: 26-25935
- GNIS feature ID: 1626239
- Website: Official website

Emmett Charter Township is a charter township of Calhoun County in the U.S. state of Michigan. It is part of the Battle Creek Metropolitan Statistical Area. The population was 11,744 at the 2020 census.

== History ==
When first organized the township was named Androver Township. It was given its present name in 1839.

== Communities ==
- The city of Battle Creek is adjacent to the township on the northwest and has annexed land that was formerly within the township, in particular the former village of Verona that was an early rival to Battle Creek.
- Beadle Lake is a lake and an unincorporated community in the western part of the township. Development extends around the lake but is centered on the south end of the lake at 42°16′02″N 85°08′58″W. Beadle Lake Elementary School is on the southeast side of the lake. Interstate 94 (I-94) passes just to the north, with an exit to Beadle Lake Road, which runs along the west side of the lake.
- Brownlee Park is an unincorporated community within the township, which has also been defined as a census-designated place (CDP) for statistical purposes. The CDP also includes the adjacent community of Greenfield Park in Pennfield Charter Township. It consists of an urbanized area just east of Battle Creek.
- Ceresco is an unincorporated community on the Kalamazoo River situated on the boundary between Emmett and Marshall Township at 42°16′19″N 85°03′41″W.
- Sunrise Heights is an unincorporated suburban subdivision in the northwest of the township at 42°17′55″N 85°10′25″W. It is adjacent to Battle Creek bounded by 6½ Mile Road/Main Street on the east, Golden Road on the south I-194/M-66 on the west, and Columbia Road and the Kalamazoo River on the north.
- Wattles Park is unincorporated community within the township, centered on Wattles Road between Michigan Avenue and I-94 at 42°18′02″N 85°06′39″W.

== Geography ==
According to the United States Census Bureau, the township has a total area of 32.5 square miles (84.2 km^{2}), of which 32.0 square miles (82.9 km^{2}) is land and 0.50 square miles (1.3 km^{2}), or 1.54%, is water.

== Demographics ==
Historical population
Census	Pop.	Note	%±
1960	9,087		—
1970	10,881		19.7%
1980	11,155		2.5%
1990	10,764		−3.5%
2000	11,979		11.3%
2010	11,770		−1.7%
2020	11,744		−0.2%
Source: Census Bureau. Census 1960- 2000, 2010.

As of the census of 2000, there were 11,979 people, 4,834 households, and 3,267 families residing in the township. The population density was 371.3 inhabitants per square mile (143.4/km^{2}). There were 5,232 housing units at an average density of 162.2 per square mile (62.6/km^{2}). The racial makeup of the township was 93.51% White, 2.11% African American, 0.68% Native American, 1.29% Asian, 0.03% Pacific Islander, 0.82% from other races, and 1.58% from two or more races. Hispanic or Latino of any race were 2.31% of the population.

There were 4,834 households, out of which 30.6% had children under the age of 18 living with them, 52.5% were married couples living together, 10.7% had a female householder with no husband present, and 32.4% were non-families. 26.9% of all households were made up of individuals, and 7.5% had someone living alone who was 65 years of age or older. The average household size was 2.44 and the average family size was 2.96.

In the township the population was spread out, with 24.5% under the age of 18, 8.5% from 18 to 24, 29.7% from 25 to 44, 24.5% from 45 to 64, and 12.8% who were 65 years of age or older. The median age was 37 years. For every 100 females, there were 95.6 males. For every 100 females age 18 and over, there were 92.6 males.

The median income for a household in the township was $42,868, and the median income for a family was $52,170. Males had a median income of $38,523 versus $27,474 for females. The per capita income for the township was $22,608. About 5.9% of families and 8.8% of the population were below the poverty line, including 13.6% of those under age 18 and 6.4% of those age 65 or over.
