= Marshall Township, Michigan =

- Township
- Location within the state of Michigan
- Coordinates: 42°17′3″N 85°0′0″W
- Country: United States
- State: Michigan
- County: Calhoun

Area
  - Total: 31.5 sq mi (81.7 km^{2})
  - Land: 31.1 sq mi (80.6 km^{2})
  - Water: 0.42 sq mi (1.1 km^{2})
- Elevation: 928 ft (283 m)

Population (2020)
  - Total: 3,157
  - Density: 101/sq mi (39.2/km^{2})
- Time zone: UTC-5 (Eastern (EST))
  - Summer (DST): UTC-4 (EDT)
- ZIP codes: 49068-49069
- Area code: 269
- FIPS code: 26-51960
- GNIS feature ID: 1626700
- Website: www.marshalltownship.org

Marshall Township is a civil township of Calhoun County in the U.S. state of Michigan. It is part of the Battle Creek, Michigan Metropolitan Statistical Area. The population was 3,157 at the 2020 census. The city of Marshall is adjacent to the township, but is administratively autonomous.

== Geography ==
Marshall Township is located just north of the center of Calhoun County and is bordered on the southeast by the city of Marshall. The unincorporated community of Ceresco lies along the western boundary of the township. Interstates 94 and 69 cross near the center of the township; I-94 leads west 10 miles (16 km) to Battle Creek and east 31 miles (50 km) to Jackson, while I-69 leads northeast 42 miles (68 km) to Lansing and south 25 miles (40 km) to Coldwater.

According to the United States Census Bureau, Marshall Township has a total area of 31.5 square miles (81.7 km^{2}), of which 31.1 square miles (80.6 km^{2}) is land and 0.42 square miles (1.1 km^{2}), or 1.34%, is water. The Kalamazoo River flows from east to west across the southern part of the township.

== Demographics ==
Historical population
| Census | Pop. | Note | %± |
|---|---|---|---|
| 1960 | 1,568 | | — |
| 1970 | 2,232 | | 42.3% |
| 1980 | 2,564 | | 14.9% |
| 1990 | 2,655 | | 3.5% |
| 2000 | 2,922 | | 10.1% |
| 2010 | 3,115 | | 6.6% |
| 2020 | 3,157 | | 1.3% |
Source: Census Bureau. Census 1960- 2000, 2010.

As of the census of 2000, there were 2,922 people, 1,081 households, and 874 families residing in the township. The population density was 93.7 inhabitants per square mile (36.2/km^{2}). There were 1,117 housing units at an average density of 35.8 per square mile (13.8/km^{2}). The racial makeup of the township was 97.13% White, 0.27% African American, 0.27% Native American, 0.65% Asian, 0.10% Pacific Islander, 0.27% from other races, and 1.30% from two or more races. Hispanic or Latino of any race were 1.68% of the population.

There were 1,081 households, out of which 35.3% had children under the age of 18 living with them, 73.4% were married couples living together, 5.0% had a female householder with no husband present, and 19.1% were non-families. 16.5% of all households were made up of individuals, and 7.5% had someone living alone who was 65 years of age or older. The average household size was 2.69 and the average family size was 3.00.

In the township the population was spread out, with 25.3% under the age of 18, 6.0% from 18 to 24, 25.9% from 25 to 44, 29.5% from 45 to 64, and 13.3% who were 65 years of age or older. The median age was 41 years. For every 100 females, there were 101.0 males. For every 100 females age 18 and over, there were 96.0 males.

The median income for a household in the township was $56,563, and the median income for a family was $66,105. Males had a median income of $44,074 versus $32,500 for females. The per capita income for the township was $25,163. About 4.7% of families and 5.0% of the population were below the poverty line, including 4.2% of those under age 18 and 1.8% of those age 65 or over.
