= Western School District =

School district in Michigan

Address
- 1400 South Dearing Road Parma, Jackson County, Michigan, 49269; United States

District information
- Grades: Pre-Kindergarten-12
- Superintendent: Mike Smajda
- Schools: 6
- Budget: $41,036,000 2022-2023 expenditures
- NCES District ID: 2635940

Students and staff
- Students: 2,688 (2024-2025)
- Teachers: 146.59 (on an FTE basis) (2024-2025)
- Staff: 319.43 FTE (2024-2025)
- Student–teacher ratio: 18.34 (2024-2025)

Other information
- Website: www.wsdpanthers.org

Western School District is a public school district in Michigan. Located directly west of Jackson, Michigan in Jackson County, it serves Parma, part of Spring Arbor and parts of the townships of Blackman, Concord, Parma, Sandstone, Spring Arbor, Summit and Tompkins.

== History ==
By 1873, Parma had a union school district. The first class graduated that year from its high school, which was known as Parma Union High School.

In 1958, districts west of Jackson, such as the Parma and Spring Arbor districts, consolidated to form Western School District. The cornerstone of the new high school was placed in 1959. Kingscott Associates was the architect. The school was expanded in 2004.

Warner Elementary (built 1951), Parma Elementary (built 1953), and Bean Elementary (built 1960) were closed in 2026 and consolidated within the new Western Elementary. It opened on February 3, 2026.

== Schools ==
Schools in Western School District
School	Address	Notes
Western High School	1400 South Dearing Road, Parma	Grades 9-12.
Western Middle School	1400 South Dearing Road, Parma	Grades 6-8.
Western Elementary School	1399 S. Dearing Rd. Parma	Grades K-5. Built 2026.
Western Career Prep High School	3950 Catherine Street, Jackson	Housed at Woodville Community Center. Shares a building with preschool and child care programs.
