= Interstate 94 in Michigan =

Interstate Highway in Michigan, United States

Interstate 94
- I-94 highlighted in red

Route information
- Maintained by MDOT
- Length: 275.398 mi (443.210 km)
- Existed: 1959–present
- Tourist routes: Lake Michigan Circle Tour; West Michigan Pike Pure Michigan Byway
- NHS: Entire route

Major junctions
- West end: I-94 near New Buffalo
- I-196 / US 31 near Benton Harbor; US 131 near Kalamazoo; I-194 / M-66 in Battle Creek; I-69 near Marshall; US 127 in Jackson; US 23 in Ann Arbor; I-96 in Detroit; I-75 in Detroit; I-69 in Port Huron
- East end: Highway 402 at Port Huron

Location
- Country: United States
- State: Michigan
- Counties: Berrien, Van Buren, Kalamazoo, Calhoun, Jackson, Washtenaw, Wayne, Macomb, St. Clair

Highway system
- Interstate Highway System; Main; Auxiliary; Suffixed; Business; Future; Michigan State Trunkline Highway System; Interstate; US; State; Byways
← M-93	→ BL I-94
← US 112	M-112	→ M-113

Interstate 94 (I-94) is a part of the Interstate Highway System that runs from Billings, Montana, to the Lower Peninsula of the US state of Michigan. In Michigan, it is a state trunkline highway that enters the state south of New Buffalo and runs eastward through several metropolitan areas in the southern section of the state. The highway serves Benton Harbor–St. Joseph near Lake Michigan before turning inland toward Kalamazoo and Battle Creek on the west side of the peninsula. Heading farther east, I-94 passes through rural areas in the middle of the southern Lower Peninsula, crossing I-69 in the process. I-94 then runs through Jackson, Ann Arbor, and portions of Metro Detroit, connecting Michigan's largest city to its main airport. Past the east side of Detroit, the Interstate angles northeasterly through farmlands in The Thumb to Port Huron, where the designation terminates on the Blue Water Bridge at the Canada–United States border.

The first segment of what later became I-94 within the state, the Willow Run Expressway, was built near Ypsilanti and Belleville in 1941, with an easterly extension to Detroit in 1945. This expressway was initially numbered M-112. In the mid-1950s, state and federal officials planned an Interstate to replace the original route of US Highway 12 (US 12). By 1960, the length of I-94 was completed from Detroit to New Buffalo. Two years later, the US 12 designation was dropped from the freeway. Subsequent extensions in the 1960s completed most of the rest of the route, including the remaining sections between Detroit and Port Huron which superseded the routing of US 25. The last segment opened to the public in 1972 when Indiana completed its connection across the state line. Since completion, I-94 has remained relatively unchanged; a few interchanges have been rebuilt, a second span was constructed for the Blue Water Bridge, and, in 1987, a plane crashed on the freeway during takeoff from the airport in Detroit. The routing of I-94 is notable for containing the first full freeway-to-freeway interchange in the United States, connecting to the Lodge Freeway (M-10), and for comprising the first complete border-to-border toll-free freeway in a state in the United States. The highway has one auxiliary route, I-194, which serves downtown Battle Creek, and eight business routes. Various segments have been dedicated to multiple people and places.

== Route description ==
The entire length of I-94 is listed on the National Highway System, a network of roadways important to the country's economy, defense, and mobility. The freeway carried 168,200 vehicles on average between I-75 and Chene Street in Detroit, which is the peak traffic count in 2015, and it carried 12,554 vehicles immediately west of the Blue Water Bridge in Port Huron, the lowest traffic count in 2015. As the state trunkline highway closest to the lake shore in these areas, I-94 carries the Lake Michigan Circle Tour south of Benton Harbor–St. Joseph and the Lake Huron Circle Tour in the Port Huron area. Sections through the Detroit area are named the Detroit Industrial and Edsel Ford freeways. I-94 in the state is either a four- or six-lane freeway for most of its length; one segment in the Detroit area has up to 10 lanes total near the airport.

=== Southwestern Michigan ===
I-94 enters Michigan from Indiana south of New Buffalo. The freeway runs northeasterly through rural Michiana farmland in the southwestern corner of the Lower Peninsula and parallels the Lake Michigan shoreline about three miles (4.8 km) inland. I-94 traverses an area just east of the Warren Dunes State Park as the freeway runs parallel to the Red Arrow Highway, a former routing of US 12 named after the 32nd Infantry Division (Red Arrow Division). The freeway crosses its companion highway south of St. Joseph; Red Arrow turns northward carrying the business loop for Benton Harbor and St. Joseph (Business Loop I-94, [BL I-94]). The Interstate curves further inland to bridge the St. Joseph River near Riverview Park. East of Benton Harbor, I-94 meets the other end of BL I-94 at an interchange where US 31 merges onto the freeway. East of the Southwest Michigan Regional Airport, I-94/US 31 meets the southern end of I-196; US 31 departs the I-94 freeway to follow I-196, and I-94 continues its course away from Lake Michigan.

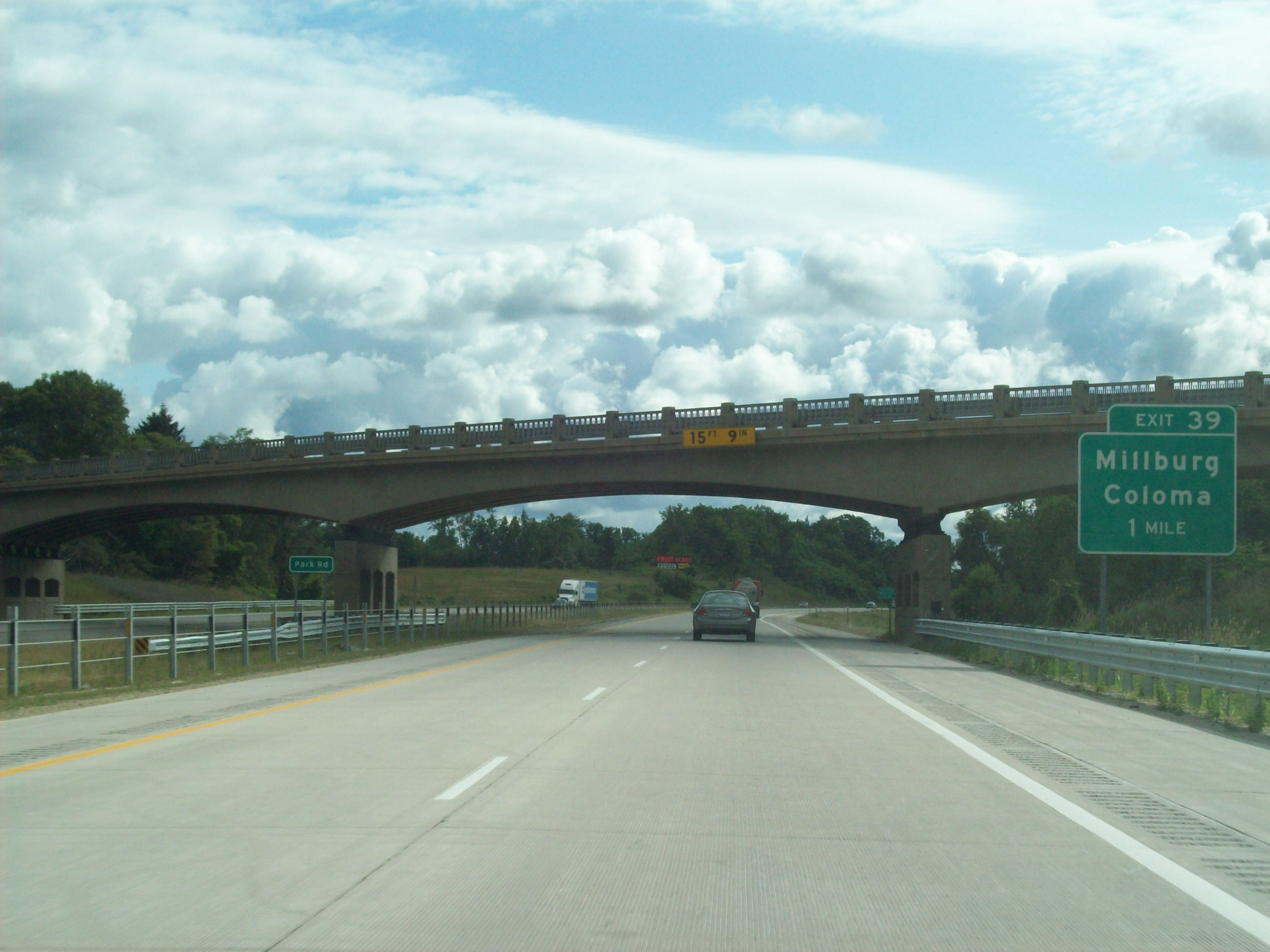
I-94 at Park Road near Coloma

South of Coloma, the trunkline turns eastward and roughly follows the Paw Paw River on a course that takes it south of Watervliet and Hartford. Between the latter two cities, the freeway transitions from northeastern Berrien County into western Van Buren County. It curves around and between Lake Cora and Threemile Lake near the junction with the northern end of M-51. About four miles (6.4 km) further east, I-94 crosses M-40 south of Paw Paw. Continuing eastward, the Interstate runs through Mattawan before entering western Kalamazoo County.

In Texas Township, the freeway enters the western edges of the Kalamazoo suburbs. South of the campus for Western Michigan University's College of Engineering & Applied Sciences in Portage, I-94 intersects US 131. Near the Kalamazoo/Battle Creek International Airport, the Interstate passes into the southeastern corner of Kalamazoo before entering Comstock Township. The freeway intersects the eastern end of Business Spur I-94 (BS I-94) at a partial interchange near Morrow Lake in the township. I-94 continues out of the eastern Kalamazoo suburbs, paralleling the Kalamazoo River through the Galesburg area. Before crossing into Calhoun County on the west side of Battle Creek, I-94 has the only driveway on any of Michigan's Interstate Highways for a gate providing access for military vehicles into the Fort Custer Training Center.

The Interstate enters Calhoun County southwest of the W. K. Kellogg Airport and enters the city of Battle Creek. Immediately east of the county line, the freeway has an interchange with the western end of Battle Creek's business loop. Next to Lakeview Square Mall, I-94 meets its only auxiliary Interstate in Michigan: I-194. I-94 turns to the northwest to round Beadle Lake, intersecting M-294 before spanning the Kalamazoo River. East of the river crossing, the freeway meets an interchange for M-96, M-311, and the eastern end of the Battle Creek business loop near FireKeepers Casino Hotel in Emmett Township. Turning back eastward, the Interstate exits the eastern Battle Creek suburbs and continues to an interchange with I-69 near Marshall; the business loop for Marshall follows I-69 southward.

=== Into Metro Detroit ===
Continuing eastward, I-94 traverses rural land on the north side of Marshall. The freeway runs north of, and parallel to, the Kalamazoo River through eastern Calhoun County. It angles southeasterly toward Albion before returning to an easterly course on the north side of town. I-94 crosses into western Jackson County before intersecting M-99. From there, it runs generally due east with a jog around Parma. West of the county airport, the Jackson business loop follows M-60 southward, and I-94 travels through the north side of Jackson. North of downtown, US 127 merges in from the north and runs concurrently with I-94 around the city. Southeast of Michigan State Prison, US 127 departs to the south, and I-94 continues eastward through the rest of the county.

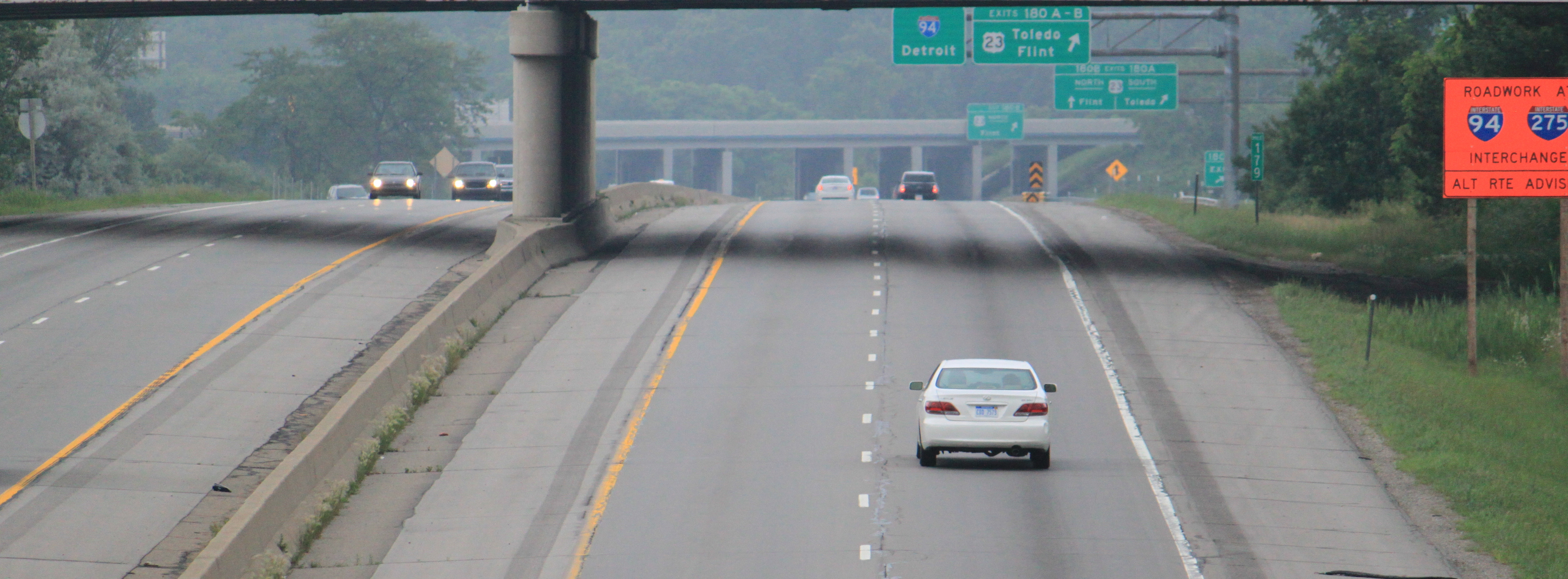
US 23 interchange in Pittsfield Township

The freeway runs north of the Chrysler Chelsea Proving Grounds in Chelsea next to the M-52 interchange. As I-94 continues easterly, it passes into the western edge of the Ann Arbor area. West of downtown, the M-14 freeway splits off to the northeast, and the Interstate turns to the south and southeast to curve around the south side of the city. The freeway passes between Briarwood Mall and Ann Arbor Municipal Airport. On the southeastern corner of Ann Arbor, I-94 intersects US 23 and continues around the south side of Ypsilanti. South of that city, the freeway also carries US 12 and crosses the Huron River north of the river's mouth at Ford Lake. I-94 jogs southeasterly around the south side of Willow Run Airport complex, separating from US 12 and entering Wayne County.

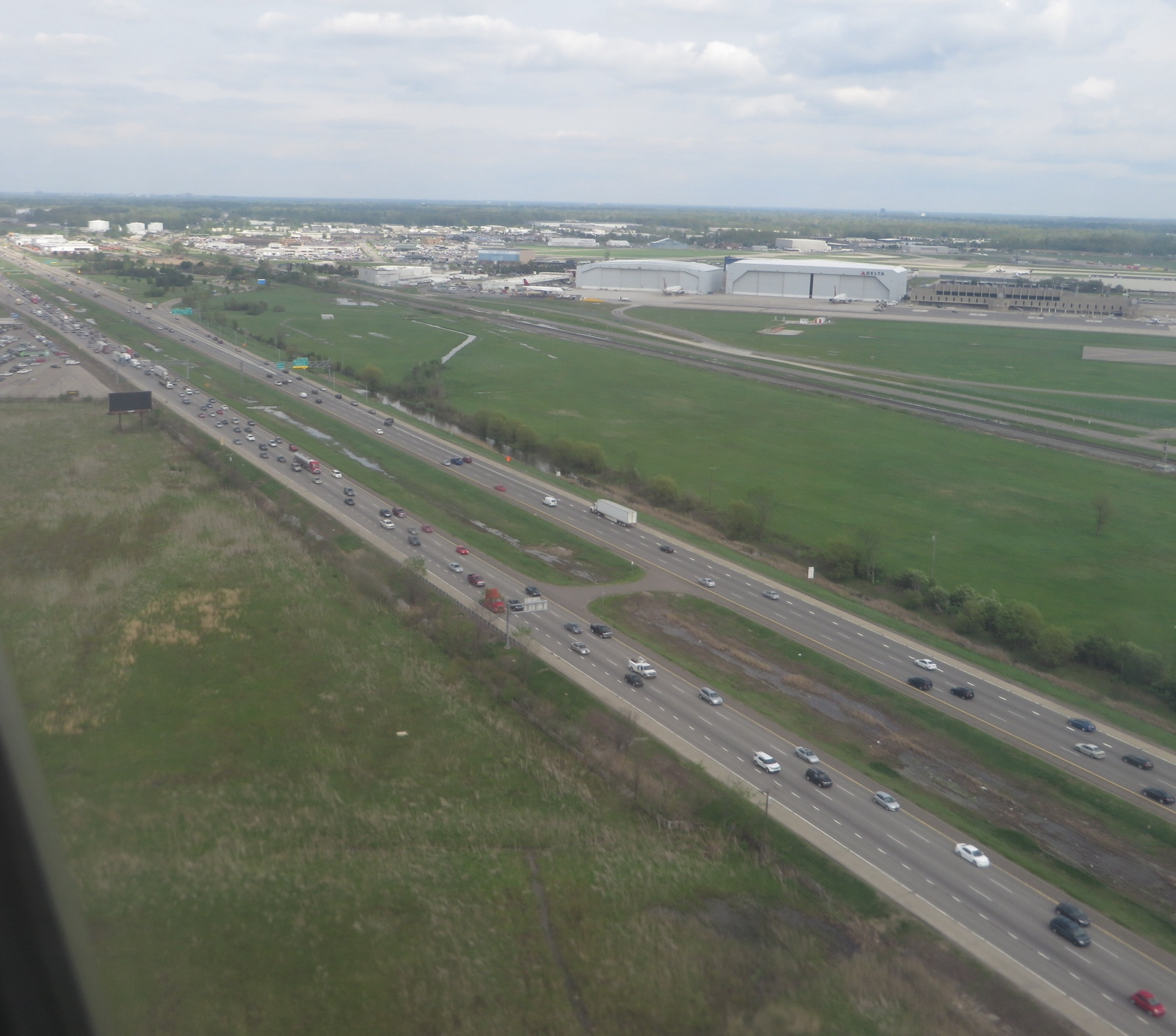
I-94 as seen from the air near Detroit Metropolitan Airport

South of Willow Run, the Interstate parallels the north shore of Belleville Lake. East of the water body, it intersects I-275 near the northwest corner of Detroit Metropolitan Airport and angles northeasterly through the southwestern Detroit suburbs along the Detroit Industrial Freeway. I-94 uses the Gateway Bridge over the single-point urban interchange (SPUI) at US 24 (Telegraph Road) in Taylor; these bridges were inspired by Super Bowl XL and provide a western entrance to the city. Further east, the Interstate intersects M-39 (Southfield Freeway) and passes the Uniroyal Giant Tire in Allen Park. I-94 then turns to the northeast through the Ford River Rouge complex in Dearborn before turning back easterly on the Edsel Ford Freeway into Detroit.

I-94 traverses Detroit in an east–west direction well inland of, and parallel to, the Detroit River. The freeway intersects I-96 (Jeffries Freeway) and M-10 (Lodge Freeway) on the West Side, passing the main campus of Wayne State University before entering the East Side at M-1 (Woodward Avenue). Immediately east of the interchange with I-75 (Chrysler Freeway), I-94 forms the southern border of the Milwaukee Junction district. The Edsel Ford Freeway continues through residential neighborhoods of Detroit's East Side. The Interstate turns more northerly, mimicking the shoreline of Lake St. Clair, and exits Detroit for Harper Woods. Just north of the interchange for M-102 (Vernier Road), the freeway crosses 8 Mile Road and enters Macomb County.

=== North to Canada ===
Running northward through Macomb County, I-94 meets the eastern end of I-696 (Reuther Freeway) about three miles (4.8 km) north of the county line in St. Clair Shores. The freeway continues to parallel the lakeshore and travels to the west of Selfridge Air National Guard Base in Harrison Township. It turns back to the northeast at 23 Mile Road at the interchange with M-3 and M-29. North of 26 Mile Road, the freeway exits the northern suburbs and passes into farmland in The Thumb region.

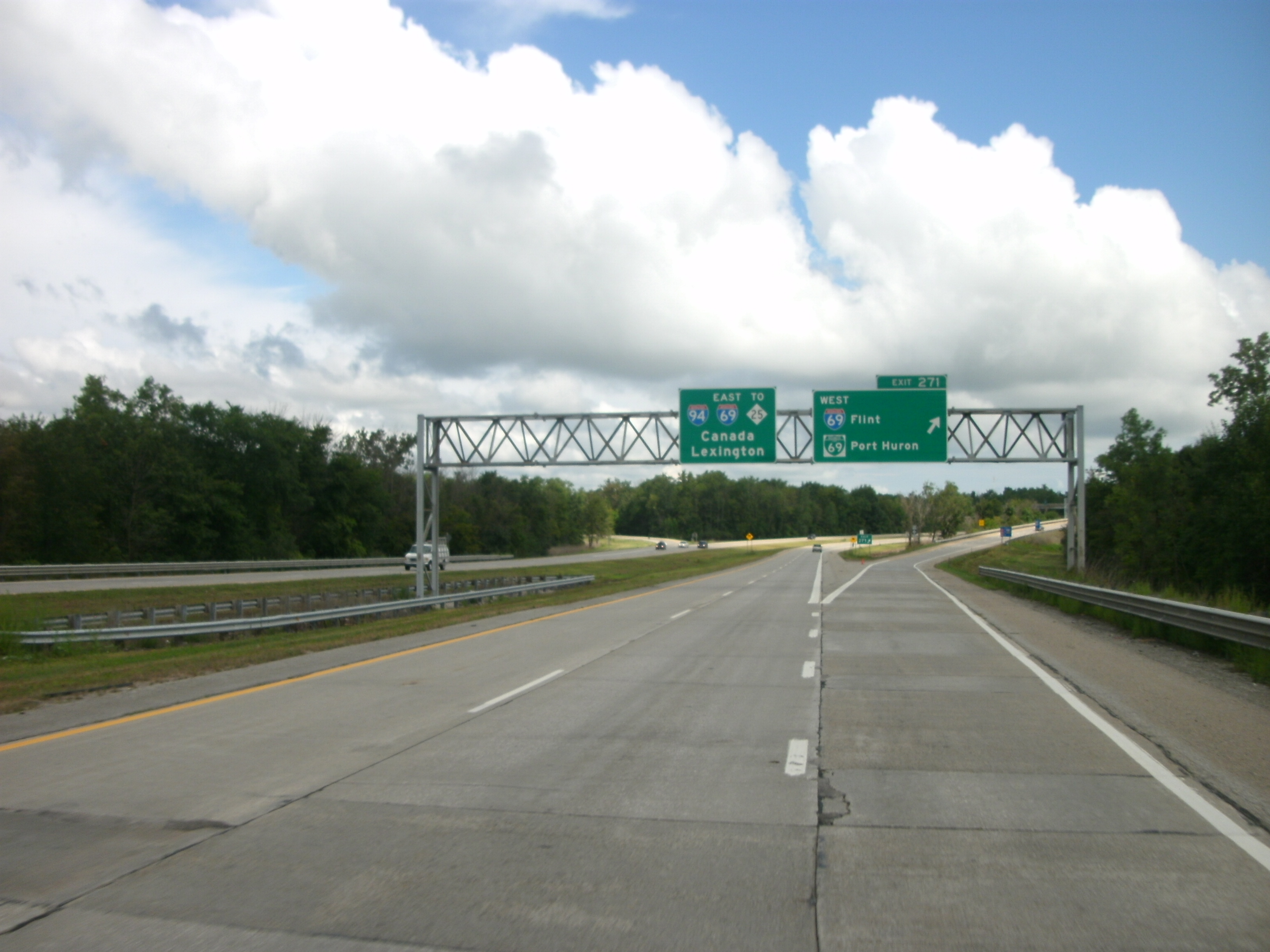
I-94 eastbound approaching exit 271 in Port Huron

South of Michigan Meadows Golf Course, I-94 crosses County Line Road and enters St. Clair County. The freeway continues northeasterly as far as Marysville before turning northward near St. Clair County International Airport. From there, it runs roughly parallel to the St. Clair River. The Interstate travels along the western edge of residential areas for Marysville and Port Huron as it continues northward. Immediately west of downtown Port Huron, it intersects I-69; the two freeways merge and turn first east and then north through an interchange that also features connections to BL I-69.

I-94/I-69 turns back to the east about a mile (1.6 km) north of their confluence to span the Black River north of downtown. On the eastern bank of the river, there is one final interchange for M-25 and BL I-69/BL I-94 before the freeway reaches the toll and customs plazas for the twin-span Blue Water Bridge. Past these plazas, I-94/I-69 ascends the approach to the bridge which crosses the St. Clair River to Point Edward (Sarnia), Ontario. At the international boundary at the center of the river, the Interstate designations jointly terminate, becoming Ontario Highway 402.

== History ==
=== Predecessor highways ===
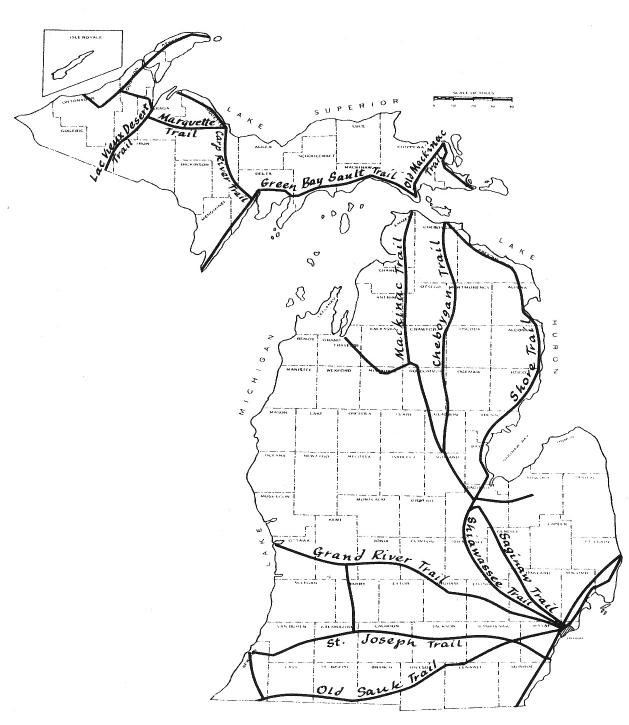
Map of the pre-statehood Indian trails

The first major overland transportation corridors in the future state of Michigan were the Indian foot trails. One of these, the St. Joseph Trail, followed the general route of the modern I-94 across the state from the Benton Harbor–St. Joseph area east to the Ann Arbor area. The State Trunkline Highway System was created on May 13, 1913, by an act of the Michigan Legislature; at the time, Division 6 corresponded to the rough path of today's I-94. In 1919, the Michigan State Highway Department (MSHD) (Note: The Michigan State Highway Department was reorganized into the Michigan Department of State Highways and Transportation on August 23, 1973. The name was shortened to its current form in 1978.) signposted the highway system for the first time, and three different highways followed sections of the modern I-94 corridor. The original M-11 ran from the Indiana state line north to Coloma where M-17 connected easterly to Detroit. The third highway was M-19 from Detroit northeast to Port Huron.

On November 11, 1926, the United States Numbered Highway System was approved by the American Association of State Highway Officials (AASHO), (Note: AASHO was renamed the American Association of State Highway and Transportation Officials (AASHTO) on November 11, 1973.) and the original route of US 12 (Note: At the time the United States Numbered Highway System was created, the highway along the modern US 12 through Coldwater and Ypsilanti to Detroit was numbered US 112.) replaced the highways from the state line northeasterly to Detroit; US 31 overlapped the highway between St. Joseph and Watervliet. The remainder of the future I-94 corridor was served by US 25 between Detroit and Port Huron. The first span of the Blue Water Bridge opened between Port Huron and Point Edward, Ontario, in 1938.

=== Early conversions to freeways ===
M-112
- Location: Ypsilanti–Detroit
- Existed: September 12, 1942–Mid-1956

The first segments of upgraded highways along the future route of I-94 were added during World War II. Construction on the Willow Run Expressway started in 1941 before the US entered the war. It was opened on September 12, 1942, to provide improved access to Ford Motor Company's Willow Run bomber plants. The highway was given the M-112 designation at the time. The expressway was extended eastward as the Detroit Industrial Expressway into Detroit; the first section opened in 1943 and the remainder was completed in March 1945. Land acquisition for the Edsel Ford Freeway started in 1945. Originally referred to as the Crosstown Freeway, the freeway became known as the Edsel Ford Freeway following an April 1946 petition. The interchange between the Lodge Freeway and the Edsel Ford Freeway was built in 1953 as the first full freeway-to-freeway interchange in the US. In mid-1956, the M-112 designation was decommissioned and replaced by a rerouted US 12. During the mid-1950s, the Detroit Streets and Rails campaign proposed a high-speed rail line in the median of the Willow Run, Detroit Industrial and Edsel Ford freeways; instead of building the rail line, special boarding stations adjacent to dedicated bus lanes in the interchanges along the highway were used.

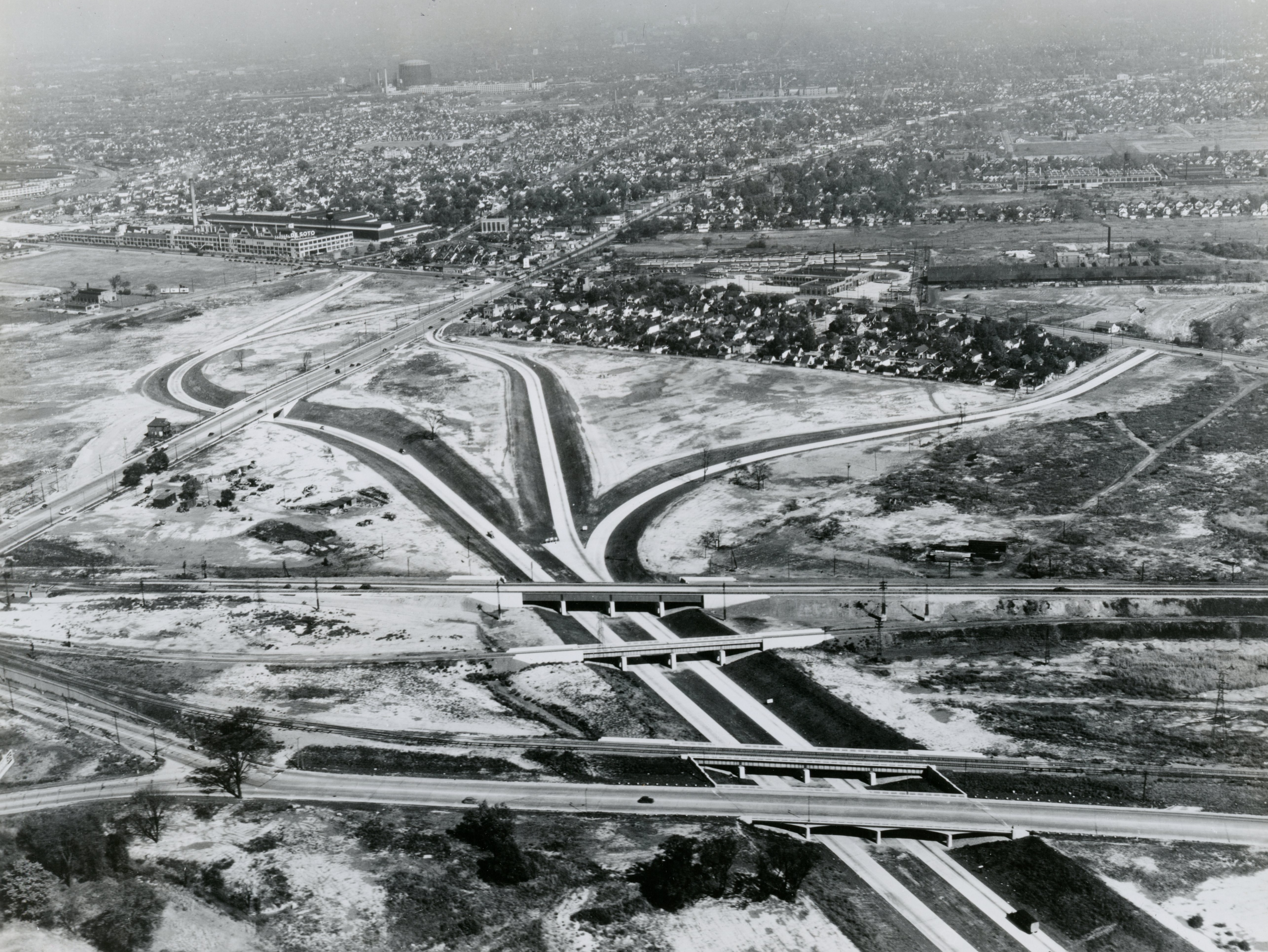
Temporary eastern terminus of the Detroit Industrial Expressway at Michigan Avenue and Wyoming Avenue in Dearborn, 1946

In other parts of the state, other segments of highway were built to bypass the cities along the future I-94 corridor. In 1940, a southern bypass of Battle Creek opened along Columbia Avenue, and the former routing through downtown on Michigan Avenue became Business US 12 (Bus. US 12). In late 1951 or early 1952, a northerly bypass of Jackson opened, and the former route through downtown on Michigan Avenue became another Bus. US 12. By the next year, the western half of the Jackson bypass opened, including a bypass of Parma. In 1954, a new bypass of Kalamazoo and Galesburg opened; US 12 was rerouted to follow the new highway while M-96 replaced part of the old route and US 12A in the area.

The first planning maps from 1947 for what later became the Interstate Highway System included a highway along I-94's route in Michigan. This highway was included on the 1955 plan for the "National System of Interstate and Defense Highways" with a proposed spur in the Battle Creek area. The modern I-94 was numbered I-92 between Benton Harbor–St. Joseph and Detroit with I-77 from Detroit to Port Huron in the August 1957 plans.

In April 1958, the MSHD wanted to provide a single number for a more direct routing of a Detroit–Chicago freeway; the state proposed rerouting I-94 to replace I-92 in the state, but retained the I-77 designation. On June 27, 1958, AASHO adopted their original numbering plan for Michigan, minus the state's proposed changes. Around the same time, a section of M-146 near Port Huron was converted into an approach freeway for the Blue Water Bridge.

=== Interstate Highway era ===
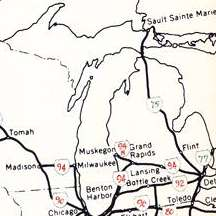
1958 planning map for Michigan's Interstate Highways

In January 1959, officials announced that sections of US 12, the Willow Run, Detroit Industrial and Edsel Ford expressways were to be given the I-94 designation, temporarily co-designated with US 12. These sections connected Ann Arbor to Detroit, along with a bypass of Kalamazoo to Galesburg and a bypass of Jackson. Later that year, additional segments of I-94 were opened, starting with a 10-mile (16 km) section from Hartford to Coloma, then another from Paw Paw to Kalamazoo which connected with a segment between Galesburg to Battle Creek. The overall 45-mile (72 km) section from Paw Paw to Battle Creek was dedicated on December 7, 1959. In addition, a new northwest–southeast section of freeway was built east of Ypsilanti to create a more gradual curve in the routing between present-day exits 185 and 186, the original routing of the Willow Run Expressway having followed present-day Wiard Road. Signage for the state's Interstate Highways was placed on hold pending finalization of the numbering scheme, and by late 1959 that signage was being added starting with I-75 and followed by the other open segments of freeway in the state.

Sections of freeway opened in southwestern Michigan in 1960 between the Benton Harbor–St Joseph area and between Jackson and Ann Arbor; the latter was built over existing portions of US 12. In this year, Michigan became the first state to complete a border-to-border toll-free Interstate within their state, running for 205 miles (330 km) from Detroit toward New Buffalo, creating the longest toll-free freeway in the country at the time.

In January 1962, the US 12 designation was removed from the I-94 freeway. In the process, the designation was transferred to replace the US 112 designation in its entirety. After this transfer, I-94 was no longer concurrent with US 12, except for the Ypsilanti bypass. In 1963, the freeway was extended south of New Buffalo to end at M-239. Traffic was diverted down M-239 into Indiana where State Road 39 carried traffic the rest of the way to the Indiana Toll Road. By the end of the year, a section of highway opened between Mount Clemens and Marysville, and US 25 was rerouted to run concurrently along the freeway from the New Baltimore area northward.

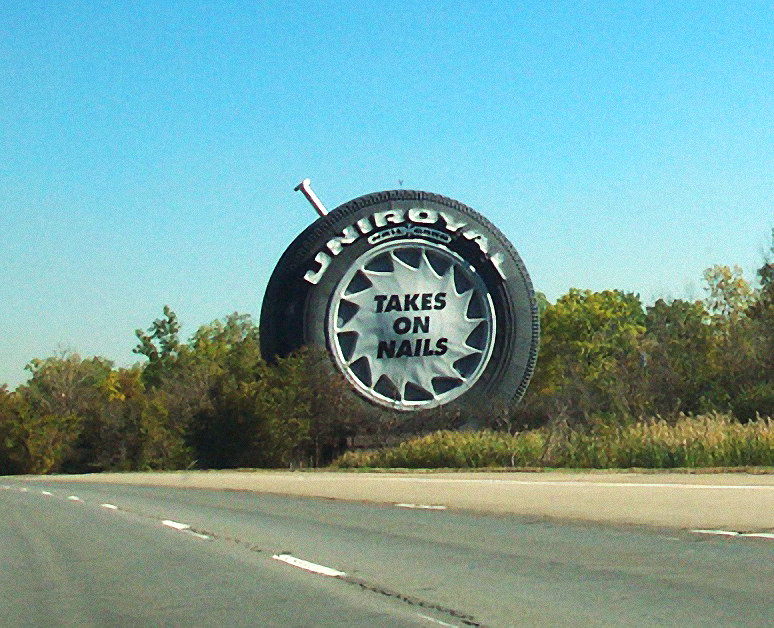
A landmark along I-94 in Allen Park, the Uniroyal Giant Tire was installed there in 1966.

The eastern terminus of I-94 in the Port Huron area was dedicated on October 14, 1964, signaling the completion of the highway between Marysville and the Blue Water Bridge. This completion displaced part of the M-146 bypass of Port Huron, the southern leg of which was retained as a connector to present-day Lapeer Road. Two years later, the gap between the Wayne–Macomb county line and the end of the freeway near Mount Clemens was filled in when another section of freeway opened. In late 1964, a plan was approved to improve the interchange with Telegraph Road (US 24), as the original interchange did not feature access in all directions. North of Albion, the route of the freeway previously crossed a branch of the New York Central Railroad at-grade; the crossing was eliminated when the tracks were removed in 1968.

The sections originally designated as the Willow Run Expressway were rebuilt from Rawsonville Road in Belleville to Ozga Road in Romulus starting in 1972. As part of this reconstruction, the segment between Haggerty and Ozga roads was widened from four to six lanes, and the eastbound lanes were realigned to facilitate construction of an interchange with I-275, a western bypass of Detroit which was under construction at the time. The Willow Run segment was also resurfaced at this point, as the old road bed did not contain steel mesh. Construction of this interchange also obliterated a partial interchange with Huron River Drive.

The final section of I-94 in Michigan opened to traffic on November 2, 1972, when the connection across the state line into Indiana was dedicated. This last segment in Michigan between M-239 and the state line opened when Indiana completed an 18-mile (29 km) segment of freeway in their state.

=== Since completion ===
The interchange with the Southfield Freeway (M-39) was closed entirely in 1985 to replace the original exit design, which included four on-ramps that sharply merged into the left lanes of I-94. Reconstruction added new on-ramps that merge into the freeway's right lane, while also moving the carriageways of I-94 closer together.

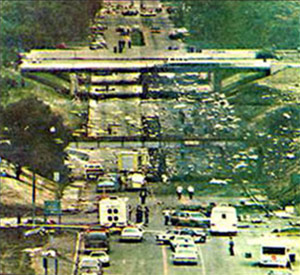
Aftermath of the Flight 255 crash, N312RC's debris field scattered along Middlebelt Road at I-94 in Romulus

On August 16, 1987, Northwest Airlines Flight 255 crashed after attempting to take off from Detroit Metropolitan Airport, killing all but one passenger upon exploding at the I-94 overpass over Middlebelt Road; that overpass was not damaged in the crash. The freeway was closed until August 18, and a memorial was later installed near the interchange between I-94 and Middlebelt Road.

The completion of I-69 in the 1980s, and the approval of the North American Free Trade Agreement, increased traffic at the Blue Water Bridge. A new toll and customs plaza was built in 1991, and, later the next year, an international task force determined that traffic on the existing structure was exceeding capacity. Environmental planning started in 1993, and construction started on the second span between Port Huron and Point Edward, Ontario in 1995. In July 1997, the second span opened. The original span was closed for rehabilitation, and both were opened to traffic in 1999.

The interchange with US 24 (Telegraph Road) following its mid-1960s redesign had only two bridges, and left-hand exits were used throughout. This interchange was reconfigured in 2005 to a SPUI design that was completed in December of that year. A pair of bridges called the Gateway Arch Bridges (alternately "Gateway to Detroit") was incorporated in the new interchange.

In 2011, construction was started to widen I-94/I-69 approaching the Blue Water Bridge and to allow for dedicated local traffic and bridge traffic lanes. The lane configuration changes confused drivers in the area, especially motorists with outdated GPS devices; because of this, MDOT installed updated signs complete with American and Canadian flags to help prevent drivers from heading to Canada by mistake.

Additional construction in the Port Huron area started in late 2013 to rebuild and reconfigure the I-94/I-69 interchange outside the city. The project improved 3.7 miles (6.0 km) of freeway, replaced several bridges and ramps and cost $76 million (equivalent to $103 million in 2025). In June 2014, MDOT closed the ramps from I-69 eastbound to BL I-69 through the interchange until later in the year. The project was completed in September 2015.

In 2016, the sections of I-94 from the Indiana state line to the M-63 interchange was designated as part of the West Michigan Pike Pure Michigan Byway. The West Michigan Pike originated in efforts in the 1910s to improve a highway along the western part of the Lower Peninsula of Michigan and to increase tourism along the Lake Michigan shore. The auto trail was eventually superseded by US 12 and US 31 after the creation of the United States Numbered Highway System in 1926.

In 2020, work began on the final link of the St. Joseph Valley Parkway to connect the US 31 freeway to I-94 east of Benton Harbor. The project cost $121.5 million and involved reconstructing the interchange with the eastern terminus of BL I-94 and 3.5 miles (5.6 km) of I-94 in the area. US 31 was rerouted to follow its new freeway section for 1.8 miles (2.9 km) from the previous end of the freeway at Napier Avenue that opened in 2003 to I-94 at BL I-94, where US 31 then followed I-94 to the I-196 interchange as before. This new routing opened on November 9, 2022.

In December 2022, the Michigan Department of Transportation (MDOT) procured a statewide tolling study. Under the study, I-94 would be the first highway to be converted into a toll road starting in 2028. Lawmakers have not yet acted upon the department's recommendation in the proposal.

Construction began on August 7, 2023, on a privately funded three-mile (4.8 km) MDOT pilot project to upgrade the left lane for connected and autonomous vehicles between Ann Arbor and Detroit.

== Memorial highway names ==
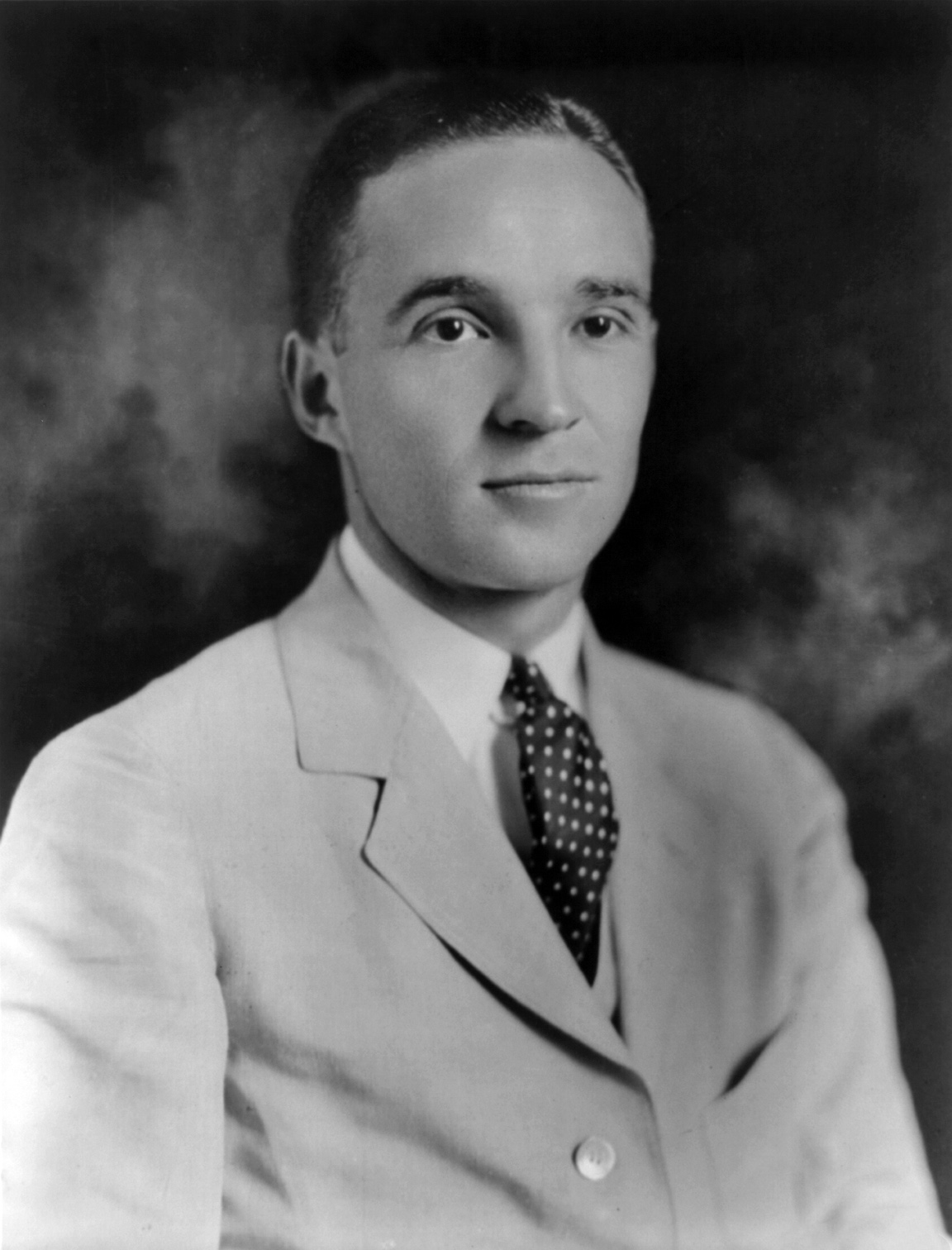
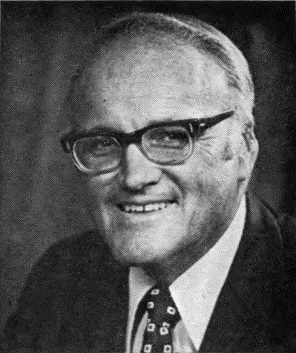
Sections of I-94 are named for businessman Edsel Ford (left) and Congressman James O'Hara (right).

As the original expressway through the center of Detroit was being planned in the 1940s, it was unofficially named the Harper–McGraw Expressway after the streets along which it was to run. There was some initial support to name it after Roy D. Chapin, the late president of the Hudson Motor Car Company and a former US secretary of commerce under President Herbert Hoover. On April 23, 1946, the Detroit Common Council voted instead to name the highway after Edsel Ford, the son of Henry Ford and president of the Ford Motor Company from 1918 until his death in 1943.

Two other original sections of I-94's predecessor highways in the Detroit area were given early names. The westernmost of these is the Willow Run Expressway, named for the Willow Run complex. The plants at Willow Run produced B-24 Liberator bombers for Ford Motor Company during World War II. The second, the Detroit Industrial Expressway, continued the route of the Willow Run Expressway eastward into Detroit. Both highways were built to move workers from Detroit to the industrial plants at Willow Run during the war and were later incorporated into I-94 in the 1950s as part of a Detroit–Chicago highway.

The section of I-94 northeast of Detroit was named after former Congressman James G. O'Hara by the Michigan Legislature. O'Hara was a World War II veteran who served in the US House of Representatives from 1959 until 1977. During his tenure in Congress, he procured federal funds for the construction of I-94 through his district. The first attempt to name the highway after him failed in 1991, but the honor was included in a budget bill passed in 1997. The section of I-94 was dedicated on October 16, 1998, after donors privately raised nearly $10,000 (equivalent to $18,000 in 2025) to pay for the highway signs.

A segment of I-94 in Battle Creek between the exits for BL I-94 and I-194 was named the 94th Combat Infantry Division Memorial Highway by the Michigan Legislature in 2002. The name honors the US Army's 94th Infantry Division, which was activated at nearby Fort Custer in 1942 and served with distinction in the European theater of World War II. Because the unit originated in Battle Creek, and its number matched that of the freeway, the Legislature added the designation by passing Public Act 305 of 2002. The name was dedicated in ceremonies at a rest stop along the section of I-94 on September 28, 2002.

Another piece of I-94 in Calhoun County was designated in 2004 as part of the Underground Railroad Memorial Highway. (Note: The other highway so designated is a section of US 131.) Starting in 1990, the National Park Service started working to identify routes of the Underground Railroad. The Battle Creek area was active in the railroad during the Civil War, and the section of I-94 between exits 98 and 110 east of Battle Creek was included in the memorial designation.

In June 2012, after a resolution passed by the Michigan Legislature was signed by Governor Rick Snyder, a portion of I-94 in Taylor between Inkster and Pelham roads was named the Auxiliary Lt. Dan Kromer Memorial Highway after a 20-year veteran of the Taylor Police Department, who was killed in 2010 while helping motorists who had car trouble.

== Exit list ==
County	Location	mi	km	Exit	Destinations	Notes
Berrien	New Buffalo Township	0.000	0.000		I-94 west – Chicago	Indiana state line
Berrien	New Buffalo Township	1.446	2.327	1	M-239 south (Harbor Country Drive) – New Buffalo	Formerly signed La Porte Road; northern terminus of M-239; New Buffalo signed eastbound only
Berrien	New Buffalo Township	3.556– 3.582	5.723– 5.765	4	US 12 / LMCT – Three Oaks, Niles, New Buffalo	Western end of LMCT concurrency; signed as exits 4A (east) and 4B (west); Three Oaks signed eastbound only
Berrien	New Buffalo–Chikaming township line	6.232	10.029	6	Union Pier	Connectss to Union Pier Road
Berrien	Chikaming Township	12.015	19.336	12	Sawyer	Connects to Sawyer Road
Berrien	Bridgman	15.561	25.043	16	Bridgman	Connects to Red Arrow Highway
Berrien	Stevensville	21.521	34.635	22	John Beers Road – Stevensville	Stevensville signed eastbound only
Berrien	Lincoln Township	23.358	37.591	23	BL I-94 east (Red Arrow Highway) / LMCT – Stevensville	Eastern end of LMCT concurrency; western terminus of BL I-94; signed as exit 23A (south) and exit 23B (north) eastbound; Stevensville signed westbound only
Berrien	St. Joseph Township	26.957	43.383	27	M-63 (Niles Avenue)	
Berrien	Benton Township	28.253	45.469	28	M-139 (Scottdale Road)	
Berrien	Benton Township	29.496	47.469	29	Pipestone Road	
Berrien	Benton Township	30.408	48.937	30	Napier Avenue	
Berrien	Benton Township	32.351– 32.360	52.064– 52.078	33	US 31 south – South Bend BL I-94 west (Main Street) – Benton Harbor	Western end of US 31 concurrency; signed as exits 33A (US 31) and 33B (BL I-94/Main Street westbound, Main Street eastbound); eastern terminus of BL I-94
Berrien	Benton Township	34.144– 34.167	54.949– 54.986	34	I-196 north / US 31 north – South Haven, Holland, Grand Rapids	Eastern end of US 31 concurrency; southern terminus of I-196; signs westbound omit Grand Rapids; signs eastbound omit South Haven
Berrien	Coloma Township	38.528	62.005	39	Millburg, Coloma	Connects to Friday Road
Berrien	Watervliet Township	40.762	65.600	41	M-140 – Watervliet, Niles	
Van Buren	Hartford Township	45.763	73.648	46	Hartford	Connects to CR 687
Van Buren	Lawrence Township	51.730	83.251	52	Lawrence	Connects to CR 365
Van Buren	Paw Paw Township	56.281	90.575	56	M-51 – Decatur, Dowagiac	Northern terminus of M-51
Van Buren	Paw Paw	59.958	96.493	60	M-40 – Paw Paw, Lawton	
Van Buren	Mattawan	65.826	105.937	66	Mattawan	Connects to Main Street
Kalamazoo	Texas Township	71.592	115.216	72	9th Street – Oshtemo	
Kalamazoo	Portage	73.591– 73.649	118.433– 118.527	74	US 131 – Kalamazoo, Grand Rapids, Three Rivers	Signed as exits 74A (south) and 74B (north); former western terminus of BL I-94; Kalamazoo signed eastbound only; exit 34 on US 131
Kalamazoo	Portage	74.845	120.451	75	Oakland Drive	
Kalamazoo	Portage	76.106	122.481	76	Westnedge Avenue	
Kalamazoo	Kalamazoo	77.753	125.131	78	Portage Road	
Kalamazoo	Kalamazoo–Comstock Township line	79.576	128.065	80	Sprinkle Road, Cork Street	
Kalamazoo	Comstock Township	80.911	130.214	81	BS I-94 west – Downtown Kalamazoo	Westbound exit and eastbound entrance; eastern terminus of BS I-94
Kalamazoo	Comstock Township	85.103	136.960	85	35th Street – Augusta, Galesburg	Galesburg and Augusta signed eastbound only; 35th Street signed westbound only
Kalamazoo	Charleston Township	87.945	141.534	88	Climax, Galesburg	Climax signed eastbound only; Galesburg signed westbound only; connects to 40th Street
Kalamazoo	Charleston Township	91.887	147.878		Access Gate to Fort Custer Training Center	At-grade intersection for military vehicles only; only driveway on an Interstate Highway in Michigan
Calhoun	Battle Creek	92.055	148.148	92	BL I-94 east / M-37 – Springfield, Battle Creek, Augusta, Climax	BL I-94, Battle Creek, and Springfield signed eastbound only; Augusta and Climax signed westbound only; western terminus of BL I-94; southern terminus of M-37
Calhoun	Battle Creek	95.082	153.020	95	Helmer Road – Springfield	Signs eastbound omit Springfield
Calhoun	Battle Creek	97.116	156.293	97	Capital Avenue	
Calhoun	Battle Creek–Emmett Township line	98.239– 98.269	158.100– 158.149	98	I-194 north / M-66 – Sturgis, Downtown Battle Creek	Signed as exits 98A (south, M-66) and 98B (north, I-194/M-66); southern terminus of I-194; exit 1 on I-194
Calhoun	Emmett Township	99.748	160.529	100	M-294 (Beadle Lake Road)	Southern terminus of M-294
Calhoun	Emmett Township	103.629	166.775	103	BL I-94 / M-96 – Battle Creek	Former partial interchange with westbound exit to westbound M-96 and eastbound entrance from eastbound M-96 only; permanently closed in 2009
Calhoun	Emmett Township	103.829	167.097	104	BL I-94 west / M-96 (Michigan Avenue) M-311 south (11 Mile Road)	Signs eastbound omit BL I-94; eastern terminus of BL I-94; northern terminus of M-311
Calhoun	Marshall Township	108.175– 108.198	174.091– 174.128	108	I-69 – Ft. Wayne, Lansing	Western terminus of BL I-94; exit 38 on I-69
Calhoun	Marshall	109.879	176.833	110	Old 27	Former US 27
Calhoun	Marengo Township	111.997	180.242	112	BL I-94 west (Partello Road) – Marshall	Partello Road signed eastbound only; BL I-94 and Marshall signed westbound only; eastern terminus of BL I-94
Calhoun	Marengo Township	115.359	185.652	115	22 1/2 Mile Road	
Calhoun	Sheridan Township	118.552	190.791	119	M-199 east (26 Mile Road)	Western terminus of M-199
Calhoun	Albion	121.364	195.316	121	BL I-94 east (28 Mile Road) – Albion	BL I-94 and Albion signed eastbound only; 28 Mile Road signed westbound only; western terminus of BL I-94
Jackson	Parma Township	123.830	199.285	124	BL I-94 west / M-99 – Albion, Eaton Rapids	Signs eastbound omit BL I-94 and Albion; eastern terminus of BL I-94
Jackson	Parma Township	126.872	204.181	127	Concord Road	
Jackson	Parma–Sandstone township line	128.417	206.667	128	Michigan Avenue	
Jackson	Sandstone Township	129.498	208.407	130	Parma Road	
Jackson	Sandstone Township	132.633	213.452	133	Dearing Road – Spring Arbor	Spring Arbor signed eastbound only
Jackson	Blackman Township	135.785– 135.804	218.525– 218.555	136	M-60 west / BL I-94 east – Jackson, Spring Arbor	Signs westbound omit Jackson; signs eastbound omit Spring Arbor; western terminus of BL I-94; eastern terminus of M-60
Jackson	Blackman Township	137.035	220.536	137	Airport Road	
Jackson	Blackman Township	138.393	222.722	138	US 127 north / M-50 west – Lansing Bus. US 127 south / M-50 east – Jackson	Western end of US 127 concurrency; northern terminus of Bus. US 127; exit 43 on US 127; reconstructed into a diverging diamond interchange in 2022
Jackson	Blackman Township	139.008	223.712	—	Lansing Avenue	Former interchange closed in 1972
Jackson	Blackman Township	139.589	224.647	139	M-106 (Cooper Street) – Downtown Jackson	
Jackson	Blackman Township	140.615	226.298	141	Elm Road	
Jackson	Blackman Township	141.617	227.910	—	Dettman Road	Former eastbound exit and westbound entrance; removed in 1972
Jackson	Leoni Township	141.926– 141.938	228.408– 228.427	142	US 127 south – Hudson	Eastern end of US 127 concurrency; exit 40 on US 127
Jackson	Leoni Township	143.849	231.503	144	BL I-94 west – Jackson	Partial interchange that had served Ann Arbor Road with westbound exit and eastbound entrance; exit removed in 2012
Jackson	Leoni Township	144.537	232.610	145	BL I-94 west / Sargent Road – Jackson	Signs eastbound omit BL I-94 and Jackson; eastern terminus of BL I-94
Jackson	Leoni Township	147.200	236.895	147	Race Road	Eastbound entrance via Ann Arbor Road
Jackson	Grass Lake Township	150.061	241.500	150	Mt. Hope Road – Grass Lake	
Jackson	Grass Lake Township	153.157	246.482	153	Clear Lake Road	
Washtenaw	Sylvan Township	155.822	250.771	156	Kalmbach Road	
Washtenaw	Sylvan Township	157.237	253.048	157	Old US 12, Pierce Road	
Washtenaw	Chelsea	159.410	256.546	159	M-52 – Chelsea, Manchester	
Washtenaw	Lima Township	162.139	260.937	162	Old US 12, Jackson Road	
Washtenaw	Scio Township	167.072	268.876	167	Baker Road – Dexter	
Washtenaw	Scio Township	169.213	272.322	169	Zeeb Road	
Washtenaw	Scio Township	171.001	275.199	171	M-14 east – Plymouth	Eastbound exit and westbound entrance; western terminus of M-14
Washtenaw	Ann Arbor	172.168	277.078	172	BL I-94 east (Jackson Avenue) – Ann Arbor	Signs westbound omit BL I-94; western terminus of BL I-94; no access from eastbound I-94 to westbound Jackson Avenue
Washtenaw	Ann Arbor	175.081	281.766	175	Ann Arbor–Saline Road	
Washtenaw	Ann Arbor	176.548	284.126	177	State Street	
Washtenaw	Pittsfield Township	179.522– 179.540	288.913– 288.942	180	US 23 / BL I-94 west – Ann Arbor, Flint, Toledo	Signed as exits 180A (south, US 23) and 180B (north, US 23/BL I-94); signs eastbound omit BL I-94; eastern terminus of BL I-94; eastbound exit uses collector-distributor lanes; Flint signed eastbound only, Ann Arbor signed westbound only; exit 35 on US 23
Washtenaw	Pittsfield Township	179.792	289.347	—	US 23 (Carpenter Road)	Original routing of US 23; was a four-ramp partial cloverleaf interchange that was obliterated when current US 23 exit was built in 1962
Washtenaw	Pittsfield Township	181.265	291.718	181	US 12 west (Michigan Avenue) – Saline, Ypsilanti	Western end of US 12 concurrency; signed as exits 181A (west) and 181B (east) westbound; Ypsilanti signed eastbound only, Saline signed westbound only
Washtenaw	Ypsilanti	183.084	294.645	183	Bus. US 12 east (Huron Street) – Downtown Ypsilanti	Western terminus of Bus. US 12
Washtenaw	Ypsilanti	183.986	296.097	184	Grove Street	Exit was removed in 1971-72; was a complete interchange with westbound access via right-in/right-out to Emerick Street
Washtenaw	Ypsilanti Township	185.023	297.766	185	US 12 east (Michigan Avenue) – Willow Run Airport	Eastern end of US 12 concurrency; eastbound exit and westbound entrance
Washtenaw	Ypsilanti Township	186.227	299.703	186	Willow Run Airport	Westbound exit and eastbound entrance; connects to Wiard Road
Washtenaw	Ypsilanti Township	187.129	301.155	187	Rawsonville Road	
Wayne	Van Buren Township	190.240	306.162	190	Belleville Road – Belleville	
Wayne	Van Buren Township	192.572	309.915	192	Haggerty Road	West access to Lower Huron Metropark
Wayne	Van Buren Township	193.368	311.196	193	Huron River Drive	Exit removed in 1973; was an eastbound exit and westbound entrance via Northline Road
Wayne	Romulus	193.978– 194.002	312.177– 312.216	194	I-275 – Flint, Toledo	Signed as exits 194A (south) and 194B (north) eastbound; westbound exit uses collector-distributor lane; exit 17 on I-275
Wayne	Romulus	195.434	314.521	196	Wayne Road – Wayne	
Wayne	Romulus	196.368	316.024	197	Vining Road	
Wayne	Romulus	197.804	318.335	198	Merriman Road – Detroit Metro Airport	Collector-distributor lanes connect with exit 199; signed as exits 198A (Metro Airport) and 198B (Merriman Road north) eastbound
Wayne	Romulus	198.548	319.532	199	Middle Belt Road	Connected to exit 198
Wayne	Taylor	200.317	322.379	200	Ecorse Road – Inkster	Directional access from I-94 to Ecorse Road (eastbound to eastbound and westbound to westbound only); Inkster signed westbound only
Wayne	Taylor	202.002	325.091	202	US 24 (Telegraph Road)	
Wayne	Allen Park	204.388– 204.399	328.931– 328.948	204	M-39 (Southfield Freeway) / Pelham Road	Exit 1 on M-39
Wayne	Allen Park	206.398	332.165	206	Oakwood Boulevard	Signed as exits 206A (south) and 206B (north) westbound; access to The Henry Ford
Wayne	Dearborn	207.626– 208.011	334.142– 334.761	208	Schaefer Road, Greenfield Road	Eastbound exit to Greenfield Road and westbound entrance from southbound Greenfield Road only; Schaefer Road access via trumpet interchange with unnamed road to Ford River Rouge Complex and partial cloverleaf interchange to Schaefer and Butler roads
Wayne	Dearborn	208.882	336.163	209	Rotunda Drive	Westbound exit and eastbound entrance
Wayne	Dearborn	209.795	337.632	210A	US 12 (Michigan Avenue) / Wyoming Avenue – Dearborn	Signed as exit 210 eastbound; no westbound exit to Wyoming Avenue; access from Wyoming Avenue to eastbound I-94 at exit 210B
Wayne	Detroit	210.048– 210.352	338.039– 338.529	210B	M-153 west (Ford Road) / Addison Avenue	Westbound exit and eastbound entrance; eastbound entrance via Weir Street; eastern terminus of M-153
Wayne	Detroit	210.669	339.039	211A	Lonyo Avenue	Westbound exit and eastbound entrance
Wayne	Detroit	211.268	340.003	211B	Central Avenue, Cecil Avenue	Westbound exit and eastbound entrance; service drives connect to Central Avenue
Wayne	Detroit	211.793	340.848	212A	Livernois Avenue	Signed as exit 212 westbound
Wayne	Detroit	212.597	342.142	212B	Warren Avenue	Indirect access via 30th Street; westbound exit is via exit 213A
Wayne	Detroit	212.819– 212.841	342.499– 342.534	213A	West Grand Boulevard, Warren Avenue	Westbound exit and eastbound entrance; former eastbound exit removed 2012
Wayne	Detroit	213.363– 213.407	343.374– 343.445	213B	I-96 (Jeffries Freeway) – Lansing, Bridges to Canada	Exit 190A on I-96; connects to the Ambassador Bridge and Gordie Howe International Bridge
Wayne	Detroit	213.598– 213.700	343.753– 343.917	214A	M-5 (Grand River Avenue) / Linwood Avenue	Signed as exit 214 westbound; second eastbound entrance from 14th Street; signs eastbound omit Linwood Avenue
Wayne	Detroit	214.414	345.066	214B	Trumbull Avenue	Eastbound exit and westbound entrance
Wayne	Detroit	214.712– 214.744	345.545– 345.597	215	M-10 (Lodge Freeway) – Downtown Detroit, Southfield	Signed as exits 215A (south) and 215B (north); exit 4 on M-10
Wayne	Detroit	215.229– 215.562	346.377– 346.913	215C	M-1 (Woodward Avenue) / John R. Street / Brush Street	John R. Street signed eastbound only, Brush Street signed westbound only
Wayne	Detroit	215.868– 215.882	347.406– 347.428	216A	I-75 (Chrysler Freeway) – Flint, Toledo	Exit 53 on I-75; includes entrances from Warren Avenue
Wayne	Detroit	216.013	347.639	216B	Russell Street	Eastbound exit only
Wayne	Detroit	216.603	348.589	217A	Chene Street, East Grand Boulevard	No westbound exit or entrance from southbound East Grand Boulevard to westbound I-94; westbound access to East Grand Boulevard northbound only at exit 217B
Wayne	Detroit	217.333	349.764	217B	Mount Elliott Avenue	Signed as exit 217 (Mount Elliott Avenue, East Grand Boulevard) westbound
Wayne	Detroit	218.226	351.201	218	M-53 (Van Dyke Avenue)	
Wayne	Detroit	219.016	352.472	219	M-3 (Gratiot Avenue)	
Wayne	Detroit	219.560	353.348	220A	French Road	No westbound exit
Wayne	Detroit	219.978– 220.086	354.020– 354.194	220B	Conner Avenue – Detroit City Airport	No access from southbound Conner Avenue to eastbound I-94
Wayne	Detroit	221.387– 221.622	356.288– 356.666	222A	Outer Drive, Chalmers Avenue	
Wayne	Detroit	222.292	357.744	222B	Harper Avenue	Eastbound exit and westbound entrance
Wayne	Detroit	223.048	358.961	223	Cadieux Road	
Wayne	Detroit	223.755	360.099	224A	Moross Road	
Wayne	Harper Woods	224.430	361.185	224B	Allard Avenue, Eastwood Drive	No entrances to I-94; signs eastbound omit Eastwood Drive
Wayne	Harper Woods	225.352– 225.376	362.669– 362.708	225	M-102 west (8 Mile Road, Vernier Road)	Eastern terminus of M-102; additional westbound entrance from southbound Harper Avenue
Macomb	Eastpointe–St. Clair Shores city line	226.893	365.149	227	9 Mile Road	
Macomb	Eastpointe–Roseville–St. Clair Shores city tripoint	227.967	366.877	228	10 Mile Road	
Macomb	Roseville–St. Clair Shores city line	228.742– 229.426	368.125– 369.225	229	I-696 west – Lansing; 11 Mile Road	Eastern terminus of I-696
Macomb	Roseville–St. Clair Shores city line	230.014	370.172	230	12 Mile Road	
Macomb	Roseville	230.890	371.581	231	M-3 (Gratiot Avenue)	Eastbound exit to northbound M-3 and westbound entrance only
Macomb	Roseville	231.354	372.328	232	Little Mack Avenue	
Macomb	Clinton Township	234.209	376.923	234	Harper Avenue	Signed as exits 234A (south) and 234B (north)
Macomb	Harrison Township	234.873	377.991	235	Shook Road	Westbound exit and eastbound entrance
Macomb	Harrison Township	235.909– 235.921	379.659– 379.678	236	Metropolitan Parkway	
Macomb	Mt. Clemens	237.266	381.843	237	North River Road – Mt. Clemens	
Macomb	Harrison–Chesterfield township line	240.027– 240.259	386.286– 386.659	240	M-59 – Selfridge ANG, Utica	Signed as exits 240A (M-59 east, Selfridge ANG) and 240B (M-59 west, Utica) eastbound; eastern terminus of M-59; roadway continues beyond terminus as William P. Rosso Highway
Macomb	Chesterfield Township	241.193	388.163	241	21 Mile Road	
Macomb	Chesterfield Township	243.453	391.800	243	M-3 south – Utica M-29 north – Algonac, New Baltimore	Northern terminus of M-3; southern terminus of M-29; signs eastbound omit M-3 and Utica; signs westbound omit Algonac
Macomb	Chesterfield Township	246.737	397.085	247	M-19 north – Richmond, New Haven	Eastbound exit and westbound entrance; southern terminus of M-19
Macomb	Lenox Township	248.118	399.307	248	26 Mile Road – Marine City	Westbound access to New Haven
St. Clair	Casco–Columbus township line	257.185	413.899	257	Richmond, St. Clair	Signs eastbound omit Richmond; connects to Fred W. Moore Highway
St. Clair	St. Clair Township	262.131	421.859	262	Wadhams Road	
St. Clair	Kimball Township	266.330	428.617	266	BL I-94 east (Gratiot Road) – Marysville	Signs westbound omit BL I-94; western terminus of BL I-94
St. Clair	Kimball–Port Huron township line	269.525	433.758	269	Range Road, Dove Street	Signs westbound omit Dove Street
St. Clair	Port Huron Township	271.271– 271.820	436.568– 437.452	271	I-69 west – Flint, Lansing	Western end of I-69 concurrency; signs eastbound omit Lansing; exit 198 on I-69
St. Clair	Port Huron Township	271.529	436.984	271	BL I-69 east – Port Huron	Eastbound exit and westbound entrance; western terminus of BL I-69
St. Clair	Port Huron Township	273.826	440.680	274	Water Street, Lapeer Avenue – Port Huron	Signed as exits 274A (Lapeer Avenue) and 274B (Water Street) eastbound; indirect access to Lapeer Avenue via Lapeer Connector (former M-146); no direct eastbound entrance to Blue Water Bridge
St. Clair	Port Huron	275.102	442.734	275	M-25 north / LHCT – Lexington BL I-69 west / BL I-94 west – Downtown Port Huron	Western end of LHCT concurrency; eastbound last exit before Canada; eastern terminus of BL I-69/BL I-94; southern terminus of M-25; signs eastbound omit BL I-69/BL I-94 and Lexington; no exit number westbound
St. Clair	Port Huron	274.770	442.199	Toll Plaza (eastbound); U.S. Customs (westbound)		
St. Clair River; Canadian border		275.304– 275.398	443.059– 443.210	Blue Water Bridge (tolled)		
St. Clair River; Canadian border		275.304– 275.398	443.059– 443.210		Highway 402 east / LHCT – Sarnia, London	Continuation into Ontario
1.000 mi = 1.609 km; 1.000 km = 0.621 mi: Closed/former; Concurrency terminus; Incomplete access; Tolled

== Related trunklines ==
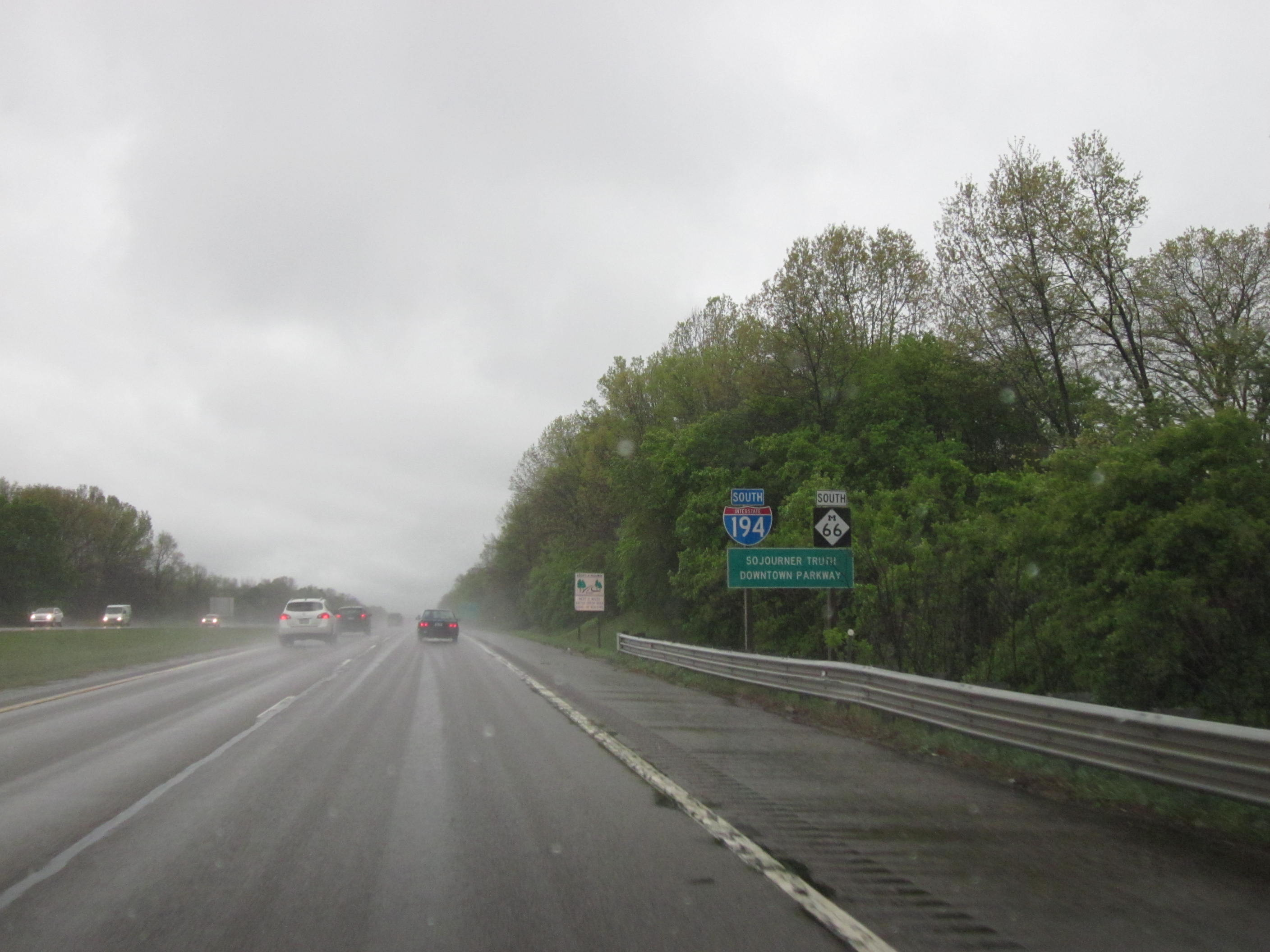
Signage along I-194/M-66, the "Sojourner Truth Downtown Parkway"

There are nine highways related to I-94 in Michigan. The first is the spur into downtown Battle Creek numbered I-194 and nicknamed "The Penetrator" and officially called the "Sojourner Truth Downtown Parkway". This auxiliary Interstate Highway runs for about three miles (4.8 km) to connect I-94 northward into downtown. The other eight highways are business loops of I-94 that connect various cities' downtowns with the main freeway. Unlike I-194, these loops are not freeways. Located from west to east along I-94's routing in Michigan, they serve Benton Harbor–St. Joseph, Kalamazoo, Battle Creek, Marshall, Albion, Jackson, Ann Arbor, and Port Huron.

== Notes ==
Interstate 94
Previous state: Indiana	Michigan	Next state: Terminus
