= Western High School (Parma, Michigan) =

Location
- 1400 South Dearing Road; Parma, Michigan 49269; United States
- Coordinates: 42°14′44″N 84°32′21″W

Information
- Established: 1959
- School district: Western School District
- Principal: Jared Vickers
- Teaching staff: 44.44 (on an FTE basis)
- Grades: 9–12
- Enrollment: 799 (2023-2024)
- Student to teacher ratio: 17.98
- Campus type: Rural
- Colors: Maroon, white and gold
- Athletics: Baseball, basketball, bowling, competitive cheer, cross country, football, golf, gymnastics, ice hockey, soccer, softball, swim, tennis, track & field, volleyball, wrestling, and powerlifting
- Nickname: Panthers
- Website: whs.wsdpanthers.org

Western High School is a high school located east of Parma, Michigan, United States. It has classes for grades 9 through 12. It is located on Dearing Road, just inside the border of Spring Arbor Township. Jared Vickers is the principal.

The school serves the northern half of Spring Arbor Township, a college community, and Parma, a mostly rural farming community. Other communities served are Woodville and Westwood, both of which are in Blackman, plus much of Sandstone, most of the area around Minard Mills, which is located in the southern portion of Tompkins, and the northeast portion of Concord Township.

== Demographics ==
The demographic breakdown of the 882 students enrolled for the 2020–2021 school year was:

- Male - 47.7%
- Female - 52.3%
- Native American/Alaskan - 0.5%
- Asian/Pacific Islander - 0.9%
- Black - 2.5%
- Hispanic - 3.6%
- White - 88.3%
- Multiracial - 4.2%

In addition, 25.1% of the students qualified for free or reduced lunches.
