= Concord Community Schools (Michigan) =

School district in Michigan, United States

Address
- 405 South Main Street Concord, Jackson County, Michigan, 49237; United States
- Coordinates: 42°10′19″N 84°38′38″W

District information
- Grades: PreKindergarten–12
- Superintendent: Rebecca Hutchinson
- Schools: 3
- Budget: $11,411,000 2022–2023 expenditures
- NCES District ID: 2610650

Students and staff
- Students: 617 (2024–2025)
- Teachers: 38.04 (on an FTE basis) (2024–2025)
- Staff: 93.8 FTE (2024–2025)
- Student–teacher ratio: 16.22 (2024–2025)
- District mascot: Yellowjackets
- Colors: Purple and Gold

Other information
- Website: www.concordschools.net

Concord Community Schools is a public school district in Jackson County, Michigan. It serves Concord and parts of the townships of Concord, Hanover, Parma, Pulaski, and Spring Arbor.

== History ==
Concord's school district was founded in 1835. A new school was built in the 1850s. It was replaced in 1878 and expanded in 1918. On October 12, 1943, the school burned down and all equipment and records were lost. For the next ten years, school would be held in temporary locations.

The current Concord Elementary/Middle School was built in fall 1953, and originally held the high school as well. Carl Kressbach of Concord was the architect. The school includes a brick from the White House, which was being renovated at the time.

On April 12, 1966, the current high school opened. An addition was built in 1975.

== Schools ==
Schools in Concord Community Schools district share a campus at 405 South Main Street in Concord. The elementary and middle schools share a building.

Schools in Concord Community Schools district
School	Notes
Concord High School	Grades 9–12.
Concord Middle School	Grades 6-8.
Concord Elementary	Grades K-5.
Concord Preschool	Preschool housed at Concord Elementary.

== Notable alumni ==
- Bob Beemer, Detroit Lions defensive end in the NFL
