= Parma Township =

Parma Township may refer to the following townships in the United States:

- Parma Township, Michigan, in Jackson County
- Parma Township, Cuyahoga County, Ohio, defunct township

== See also ==
- Parma Township, New York, town in Monroe County
