= Ford–Lodge interchange =

Ford–Lodge Interchange
- Interactive map of Ford–Lodge Interchange

Location
- Detroit, Michigan
- Coordinates: 42.3589°N 83.0764°W
- Roads at junction: I-94 (Edsel Ford Freeway); M-10 (John C.Lodge Freeway)

Construction
- Spans: 14
- Constructed: 1951–53 by MSHD
- Opened: October 1955
- Maintained by: MDOT

The Ford–Lodge interchange is a freeway interchange in Detroit, Michigan. It forms the junction of Interstate 94 (I-94, Edsel Ford Freeway), with M-10 (John C. Lodge Freeway). The interchange was completed in 1955, and is the first full freeway-to-freeway interchange in the United States.

== History ==
The Ford–Lodge interchange was part of Detroit freeway system as conceived in the late 1940s and early 1950s, a joint project involving the city of Detroit, the Wayne County Road Commission, and the Michigan State Highway Department.

One of the biggest challenges for the designers was the intersection of the two freeways. The accepted design for an interchange between two busy highways was the cloverleaf. However, the Michigan engineers rejected the idea, stating that the crossover traffic and tight turns would be too hazardous. They preferred "a design with simple turns that could be performed at relatively high speeds". A 1944 Detroit News article announced that the design would be a rotary type, which had been used on the East Coast but never in the Midwest. However, a visit by engineers from New Jersey resulted in a change of design; the New Jersey engineers warned that a rotary could only handle about 3000 vehicles per hour, far less than what the Michigan engineers anticipated.

The interchange involved 14 separate overpasses in order to provide unrestricted flow of traffic. A scale model of the interchange was put on display in New York at a "Conference of the Future"; conference organizers wanted to exhibit it because they considered it to be "most outstanding design for a highway interchange in the country".

According to the Detroit News, as soon as the barriers were removed, "cars from downtown roared under the bridges of the $15,300,000 crossing in such numbers that by 5 p.m. a haze of new concrete dust hung like fog in the air. Drivers dipped into the new interchange underpass they had never seen at a cautious 50. By the time (five seconds or so) it took to hit the straightaway, they were back at a minimum 60 and honking impatiently at the few timid souls who lagged."

== Design ==
The interchange is a full interchange, with ramps on the both right and left sides of the roadways. This "right-to-go-right-left-to-go-left" design was considered progressive for its time.
