= Bob Beemer (American football) =

American football player (born 1963)

No. 99
- Position: Defensive end

Personal information
- Born: May 14, 1963 (age 63); Jackson, Michigan, U.S.
- Listed height: 6 ft 3 in (1.91 m)
- Listed weight: 231 lb (105 kg)

Career information
- High school: Concord
- College: Toledo
- NFL draft: 1986: undrafted

Career history
- Detroit Lions (1987)

Awards and highlights
- First-team All-MAC (1985); Second-team All-MAC (1984)
- Stats at Pro Football Reference

Robert Lester Beemer (born May 14, 1963) is an American former professional football player who was a defensive end for the Detroit Lions of the National Football League (NFL). He played college football for the Toledo Rockets.
