= Gateway Bridge (Michigan) =

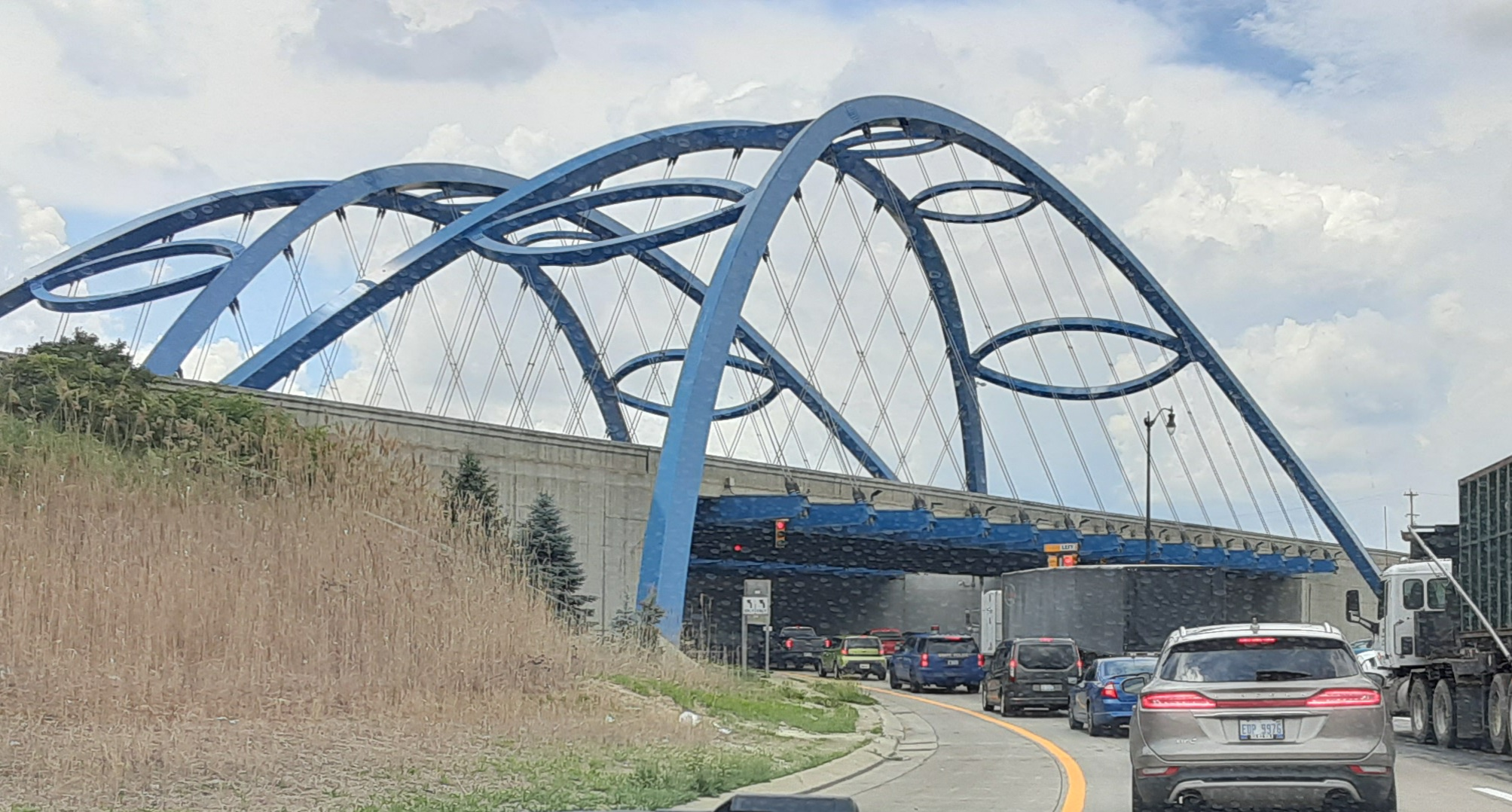
- View of Gateway Bridge from I-94 merge onto US 24
- Coordinates: 42.2649°N 83.2704°W
- Carries: I-94
- Crosses: US 24 (Telegraph Road)
- Locale: Taylor, Michigan
- Maintained by: MDOT

Characteristics
- Design: Tied-arch bridge
- Material: Steel
- Total length: 250 ft (76 m)
- Width: 75 ft (23 m)
- Height: 87 ft (27 m)

History
- Construction cost: $14 million
- Opened: Fall 2005

The Gateway Bridge is a tied-arch bridge in Taylor, Michigan. It carries Interstate 94 (I-94) over eight lanes of US Highway 24 (US 24, Telegraph Road). The bridge itself is six travel lanes wide.

== History ==
The Gateway Bridge was developed by the Detroit Regional Gateway Advisory Council (DRGAC) in preparation for Super Bowl XL, hosted in nearby Detroit in February 2006. It was one of several improvements made in the mid-2000s along 18 miles (29 km) of Interstate 94. The bridge cost $14 million (equivalent to $21.6 million in 2023) and was part of an approximately $520 million (equivalent to $804 million in 2023) I-94 improvements. The unique design meant that the cost was $2 million (equivalent to $3.1 million in 2023) higher than conventional plate-girder bridges, causing public controversy. Private funds were largely used to cover the increase.

Inspiration for the bridge came from a 1987 article by Frank Peters in the St. Louis Post-Dispatch about a tied-arch bridge over the Mississippi River.

Construction began in May 2004 while I-94 traffic continued to utilize existing bridges. C.A. Hull Company was contracted to construct the bridges and Dan's Excavating Inc. performed demolition work. Ruby+Associates provided construction engineering and proposed an alternate construction method that eliminated the need for large shoring. A steel delivery delay caused work to slow at one point. The beams were fabricated by PDM Bridge. The bridge was covered with three coats of blue paint and one clear coat to prevent fading. The bridge was completed in Fall 2005.

It is known as the Gateway Bridge, because it acts as the "gateway to Detroit" for those traveling on I-94 from Detroit Metropolitan Airport to the City of Detroit.

== Design ==
Engineers from the Michigan Department of Transportation (MDOT) worked with Alfred Benesch & Company to create the bridge design. The bridge features twin tied-arch steel spans featuring two large blue ovals, augmented with additional ovals, meant to evoke images of footballs, to commemorate Super Bowl XL. The arches reach 70 feet (21 m) above I-94 and 87 feet (27 m) above US 24. The bridge is 250 feet (76 m) long and 75 feet (23 m) wide. The six-lane bridge carries I-94 over the eight-lane US 24. The design introduced a single-point urban interchange, a new design in Michigan at the time. That interchange was completed in December 2005.

Each span uses approximately 1,400,000 pounds (640,000 kg) of steel. The bridge is topped with a 9-inch-thick (23 cm) concrete deck—which is standard in Michigan—and a 1.5-inch (3.8 cm) microsilica concrete overlay to protect the concrete's structural integrity. addition of a microsilica concrete overlay was unusual in Michigan at the time of the bridge's construction.

Special lighting is used to illuminate the bridge at night.

In 2007, the National Steel Bridge Alliance awarded the design in its medium span category.

== Maintenance ==
Prior to the bridge's opening, Wayne County and Detroit governments pledged $250,000 (equivalent to $400,000 in 2023) per year to maintain the improvements made to I-94 that prompted the bridge's construction. MDOT is responsible for maintenance of the bridge itself.
