= Concord Township, Michigan =

- Civil township
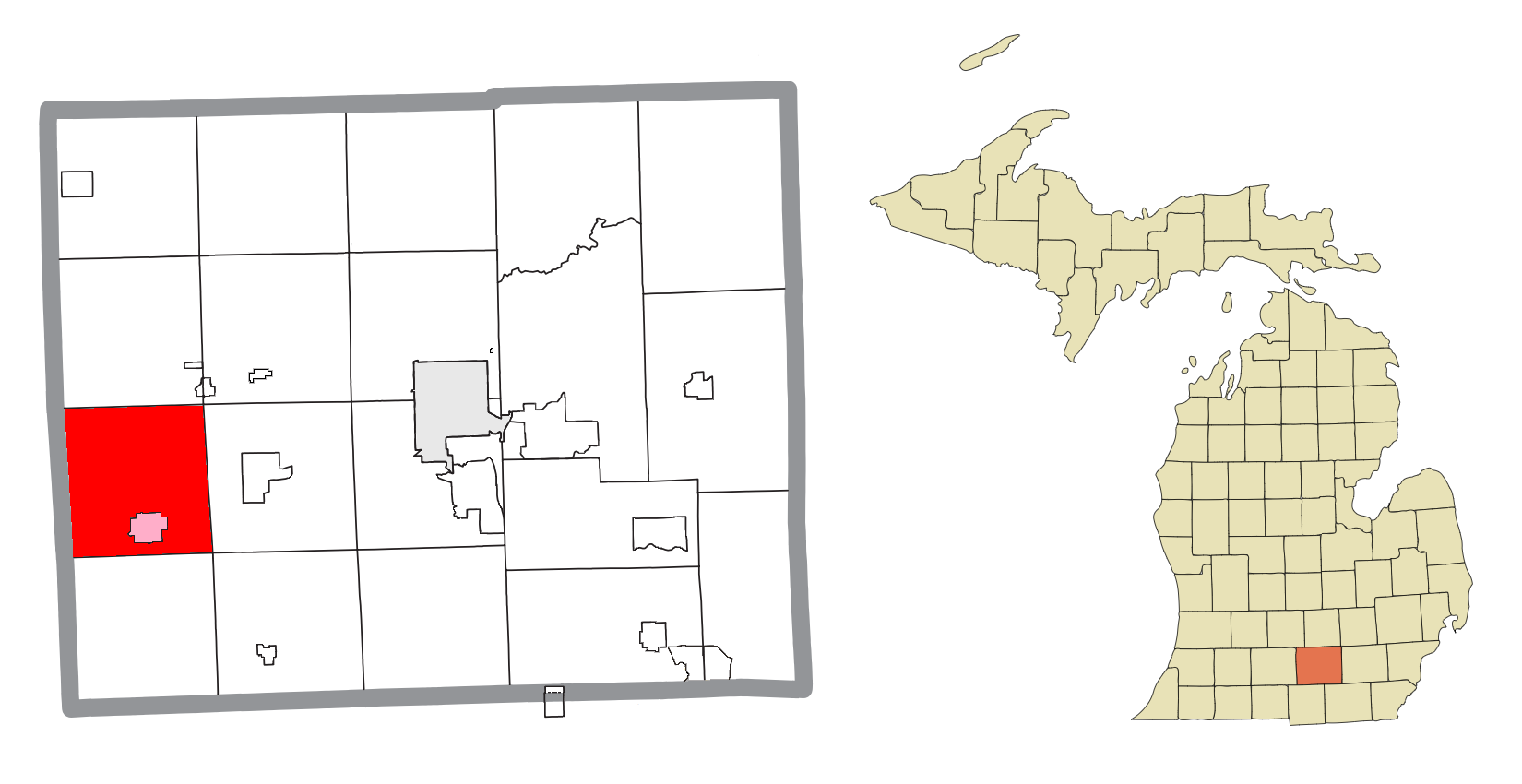
- Location within Jackson County (red) and the administered village of Concord (pink)

- Location within the state of Michigan Concord Township (the United States)
- Coordinates: 42°11′55″N 84°39′32″W
- Country: United States
- State: Michigan
- County: Jackson
- Organized: 1836

Government
  - Supervisor: David Saenz
  - Clerk: Terri Butts

Area
  - Total: 36.20 sq mi (93.8 km^{2})
  - Land: 35.73 sq mi (92.5 km^{2})
  - Water: 0.47 sq mi (1.2 km^{2})
- Elevation: 988 ft (301 m)

Population (2020)
  - Total: 2,755
  - Density: 77.11/sq mi (29.77/km^{2})
- Time zone: UTC-5 (Eastern (EST))
  - Summer (DST): UTC-4 (EDT)
- ZIP code(s): 49224 (Albion); 49237 (Concord); 49269 (Parma); 49283 (Spring Arbor)
- Area code: 517
- FIPS code: 26-17760
- GNIS feature ID: 1626127
- Website: Official website

Concord Township (/'kɐn.koɻd̪/ /ˈtɐʊn.ʃɪp/) is a civil township of Jackson County in the U.S. state of Michigan. The population was 2,755 at the 2020 census.

== Communities ==
- Concord is a village within the township.
- Bath Mills and North Concord Station were both stations on the Michigan Central Railroad in the northern part of the township. The North Concord Station was located on North Concord Road between Erie and King roads.

== Geography ==
According to the United States Census Bureau, the township has a total area of 36.20 square miles (93.76 km^{2}), of which 35.73 square miles (92.54 km^{2}) is land and 0.47 square miles (1.22 km^{2}) (1.30%) is water.

Concord Township is in western Jackson County and is bordered to the west by Calhoun County. Highway M-60 passes through the township, leading northeast to Jackson, the county seat, and southwest to Homer.

It is drained by the North Branch of the Kalamazoo River.

== Demographics ==
At the 2000 census, there were 2,692 people, 986 households and 753 families residing in the township. The population density was 75.1 inhabitants per square mile (29.0/km^{2}). There were 1,092 housing units at an average density of 30.5 per square mile (11.8/km^{2}). The racial makeup of the township was 98.11% White, 0.15% African American, 0.33% Native American, 0.33% Asian, 0.07% Pacific Islander, 0.48% from other races, and 0.52% from two or more races. Hispanic or Latino of any race were 0.82% of the population.

There were 986 households, of which 37.1% had children under the age of 18 living with them, 64.2% were married couples living together, 8.1% had a female householder with no husband present, and 23.6% were non-families. 20.2% of all households were made up of individuals, and 8.2% had someone living alone who was 65 years of age or older. The average household size was 2.72 and the average family size was 3.14.

28.8% of the population were under the age of 18, 7.5% from 18 to 24, 29.0% from 25 to 44, 23.4% from 45 to 64, and 11.3% who were 65 years of age or older. The median age was 36 years. For every 100 females, there were 100.1 males. For every 100 females age 18 and over, there were 99.1 males.

The median household income was $50,000 and the median family income was $55,991. Males had a median income of $37,482 versus $25,625 for females. The per capita income for the township was $19,417. About 3.5% of families and 5.2% of the population were below the poverty line, including 4.0% of those under age 18 and 4.7% of those age 65 or over.
