= Spring Arbor Township, Michigan =

- Civil township
- Seal

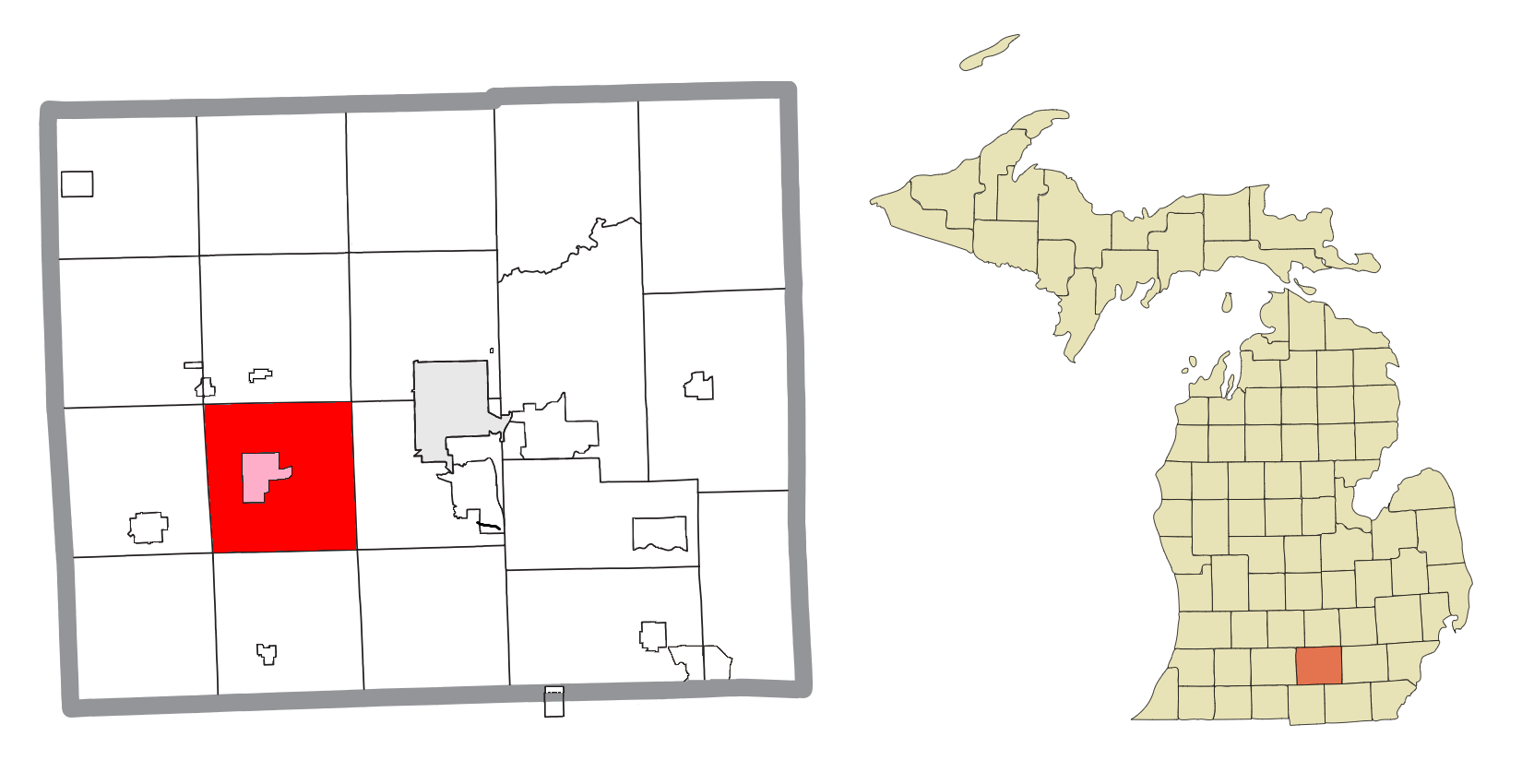
- Location within Jackson County (red) and the administered community of Spring Arbor (pink)

- Location within the state of Michigan Spring Arbor Township (the United States)
- Coordinates: 42°12′47″N 84°31′54″W
- Country: United States
- State: Michigan
- County: Jackson
- Established: 1835

Government
  - Supervisor: David Herlein
  - Clerk: Patricia Bush
  - Treasurer: Katie Trachsel
  - Trustees: Mike Archer; Jim Buck; Troy Ganton; Josh Walz

Area
  - Total: 35.75 sq mi (92.6 km^{2})
  - Land: 35.10 sq mi (90.9 km^{2})
  - Water: 0.65 sq mi (1.7 km^{2})
- Elevation: 1,001 ft (305 m)

Population (2020)
  - Total: 8,530
  - Density: 243/sq mi (93.8/km^{2})
- Time zone: UTC-5 (Eastern (EST))
  - Summer (DST): UTC-4 (EDT)
- ZIP code(s): 49201 (Jackson); 49237 (Concord); 49246 (Horton); 49269 (Parma); 49283 (Spring Arbor)
- Area code: 517
- FIPS code: 26-75640
- GNIS feature ID: 1627106
- Website: Official website

Spring Arbor Township is a civil township of Jackson County, Michigan, United States. The population was 8,530 at the 2020 census, up from 8,267 at the 2010 census.

== Communities ==
- Spring Arbor is an unincorporated community and census-designated place within the township.

== Geography ==
According to the United States Census Bureau, the township has a total area of 35.75 square miles (92.59 km^{2}), of which 35.10 square miles (90.91 km^{2}) is land and 0.65 square miles (1.68 km^{2}) (1.82%) is water.

The township is in west-central Jackson County, 9 miles (14 km) west of Jackson, the county seat. Highway M-60 passes through the township, including the community of Spring Arbor, leading east to the western side of Jackson and west to Concord and Tekonsha. The west side of the township is part of the Kalamazoo River watershed, while the east side flows toward the Grand River. The North Branch of the Kalamazoo River passes through the southwest corner of the township.

Located west of the city of Jackson, it covers the entirety of the survey township of T3S R2W.

== Demographics ==
As of the census of 2000, there were 7,577 people, 2,570 households, and 1,930 families residing in the township. The population density was 214.1 inhabitants per square mile (82.7/km^{2}). There were 2,694 housing units at an average density of 76.1 per square mile (29.4/km^{2}). The racial makeup of the township was 97.04% White, 0.81% African American, 0.40% Native American, 0.50% Asian, 0.13% Pacific Islander, 0.36% from other races, and 0.77% from two or more races. Hispanic or Latino of any race were 1.72% of the population.

There were 2,570 households, out of which 36.7% had children under the age of 18 living with them, 61.7% were married couples living together, 9.7% had a female householder with no husband present, and 24.9% were non-families. 21.1% of all households were made up of individuals, and 9.7% had someone living alone who was 65 years of age or older. The average household size was 2.64 and the average family size was 3.05.

In the township the population was spread out, with 25.3% under the age of 18, 14.3% from 18 to 24, 25.2% from 25 to 44, 21.8% from 45 to 64, and 13.4% who were 65 years of age or older. The median age was 35 years. For every 100 females, there were 91.6 males. For every 100 females age 18 and over, there were 85.9 males.

The median income for a household in the township was $51,770, and the median income for a family was $59,407. Males had a median income of $42,245 versus $27,729 for females. The per capita income for the township was $19,622. About 4.5% of families and 7.9% of the population were below the poverty line, including 8.9% of those under age 18 and 5.1% of those age 65 or over.

== Education ==
The following school districts include sections of the township:

- Western School District
- Concord Community Schools
- Hanover-Horton School District
