= Sandstone Charter Township, Michigan =

Sandstone Township, Michigan
- Charter township
- Sandstone Charter Township
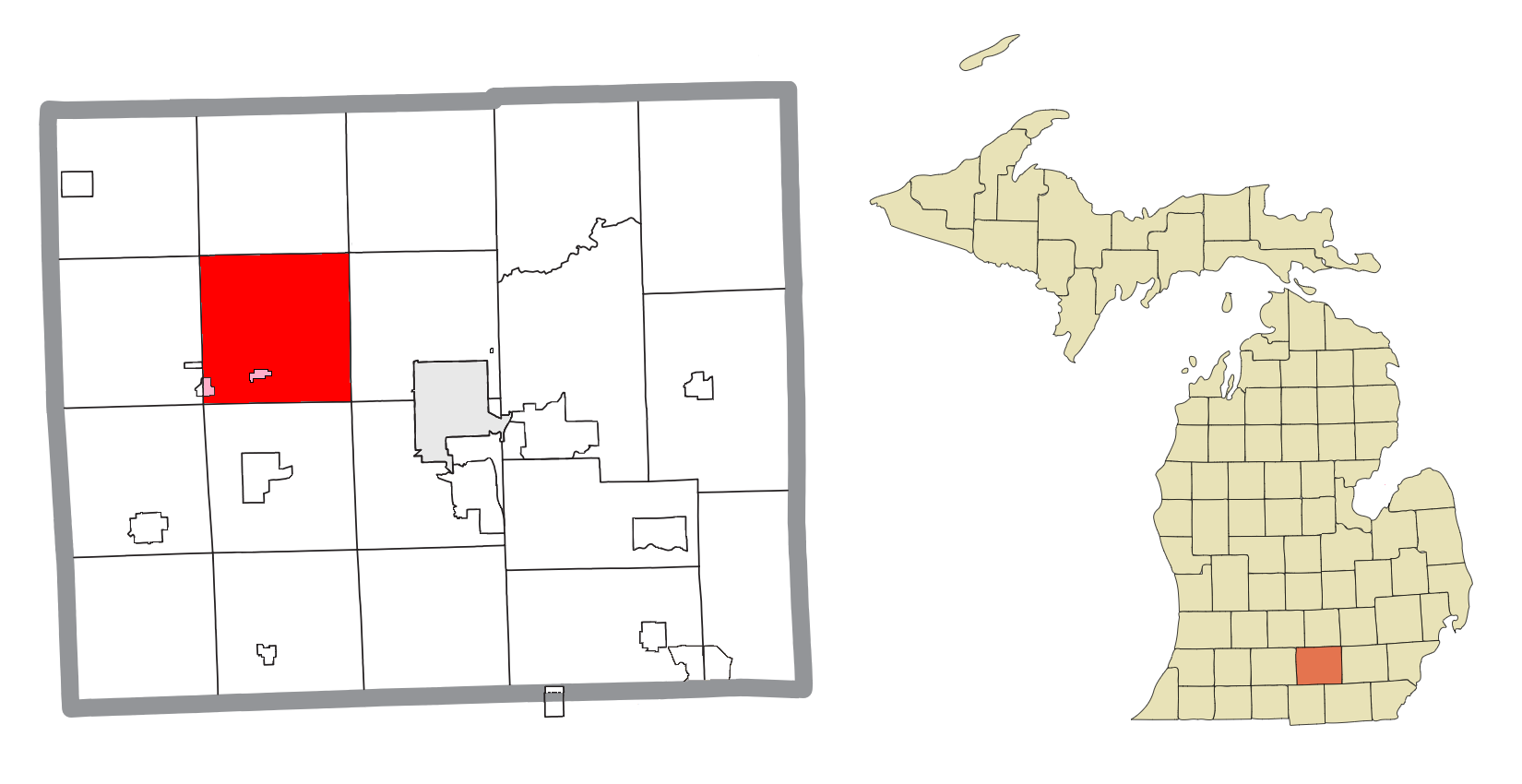
- Location within Jackson County (red) and administered portions of Parma village (pink)

- Location within the state of Michigan
- Coordinates: 42°17′12″N 84°32′36″W
- Country: United States
- State: Michigan
- County: Jackson
- Established: 1837

Government
  - Supervisor: L. Keith Acker
  - Clerk: Priscilla Sterrett

Area
  - Total: 36.18 sq mi (93.7 km^{2})
  - Land: 36.00 sq mi (93.2 km^{2})
  - Water: 0.18 sq mi (0.47 km^{2})
- Elevation: 991 ft (302 m)

Population (2020)
  - Total: 3,927
  - Density: 109.1/sq mi (42.12/km^{2})
- Time zone: UTC-5 (Eastern (EST))
  - Summer (DST): UTC-4 (EDT)
- ZIP code(s): 49201 (Jackson); 49269 (Parma)
- Area code: 517
- FIPS code: 26-71500
- GNIS feature ID: 1627041
- Website: Official website

Sandstone Charter Township is a charter township of Jackson County in the U.S. state of Michigan. As of the 2020 census, the population was 3,927.

== Communities ==
- Parma is a village that contains two sections within the township and also extends into Parma Township to the west.
- Sandstone is a small unincorporated community in the southeastern part of the township at 42°15′10″N 84°31′04″W.

== History ==
Originally part of Spring Arbor Township, Sandstone was established in 1837 by act of the state legislature. It incorporated as a charter township in 2000 after rapid commercial and industrial development and the need for expanded municipal powers. One major development was Michigan Automotive Compressors, Inc. (MACI), which produces parts for the automotive industry and employs several hundred members of the community.

Sandstone Station is a former railroad stop along the current Norfolk Southern Railway/Amtrak line between Jackson and Albion. The station building is located at the intersection of Sandstone Road and Michigan Avenue (formerly U.S. Highway 12).

- Sandstone Station

== Geography ==
According to the United States Census Bureau, the township has a total area of 36.18 square miles (93.71 km^{2}), of which 36.00 square miles (93.24 km^{2}) is land and 0.18 square miles (0.47 km^{2}) (0.50%) is water.

The township is in western Jackson County. Interstate 94 passes through the township south of its center, with access from Exits 130 and 133. I-94 leads east 7 miles (11 km) to Jackson, the county seat, and west 33 miles (53 km) to Battle Creek.

The township is drained by Sandstone Creek, which flows north toward the Grand River. The entire territory encompasses the T2S R2W survey township.

== Government ==
Sandstone is a Charter Township, incorporated under the Charter Township Act of 1947 and governed by a Township Board, consisting of a Supervisor, Clerk, Treasurer and four Trustees. The members of the Board are currently:

- Supervisor: Keith Acker, (Republican)
- Clerk: Priscilla Sterrett, (Republican)
- Treasurer: Theresa Taylor, (Republican)
- Trustees: Cheryl Marks, William Paulis, Rosalyn Thompson, and James Wellman (all Republican)

== Demographics ==
As of the census of 2000, there were 3,801 people, 1,321 households, and 1,051 families residing in the township. The population density was 104.8 inhabitants per square mile (40.5/km^{2}). There were 1,358 housing units at an average density of 37.4 per square mile (14.4/km^{2}). The racial makeup of the township was 97.40% White, 0.50% African American, 0.39% Native American, 0.45% Asian, 0.29% from other races, and 0.97% from two or more races. Hispanic or Latino of any race were 0.97% of the population.

There were 1,321 households, out of which 38.6% had children under the age of 18 living with them, 67.2% were married couples living together, 8.4% had a female householder with no husband present, and 20.4% were non-families. 17.3% of all households were made up of individuals, and 6.0% had someone living alone who was 65 years of age or older. The average household size was 2.80 and the average family size was 3.15.

In the township the population was spread out, with 29.0% under the age of 18, 6.1% from 18 to 24, 28.6% from 25 to 44, 24.8% from 45 to 64, and 11.5% who were 65 years of age or older. The median age was 38 years. For every 100 females, there were 100.2 males. For every 100 females age 18 and over, there were 95.3 males.

The median income for a household in the township was $50,396, and the median income for a family was $53,594. Males had a median income of $40,175 versus $26,985 for females. The per capita income for the township was $22,622. About 4.3% of families and 4.7% of the population were below the poverty line, including 6.1% of those under age 18 and 3.6% of those age 65 or over.

== Education ==
There are three school districts in the township. They are:

- Western School District
- Northwest School District
- Springport School District
