= Parma, Michigan =

- Village
- Village of Parma
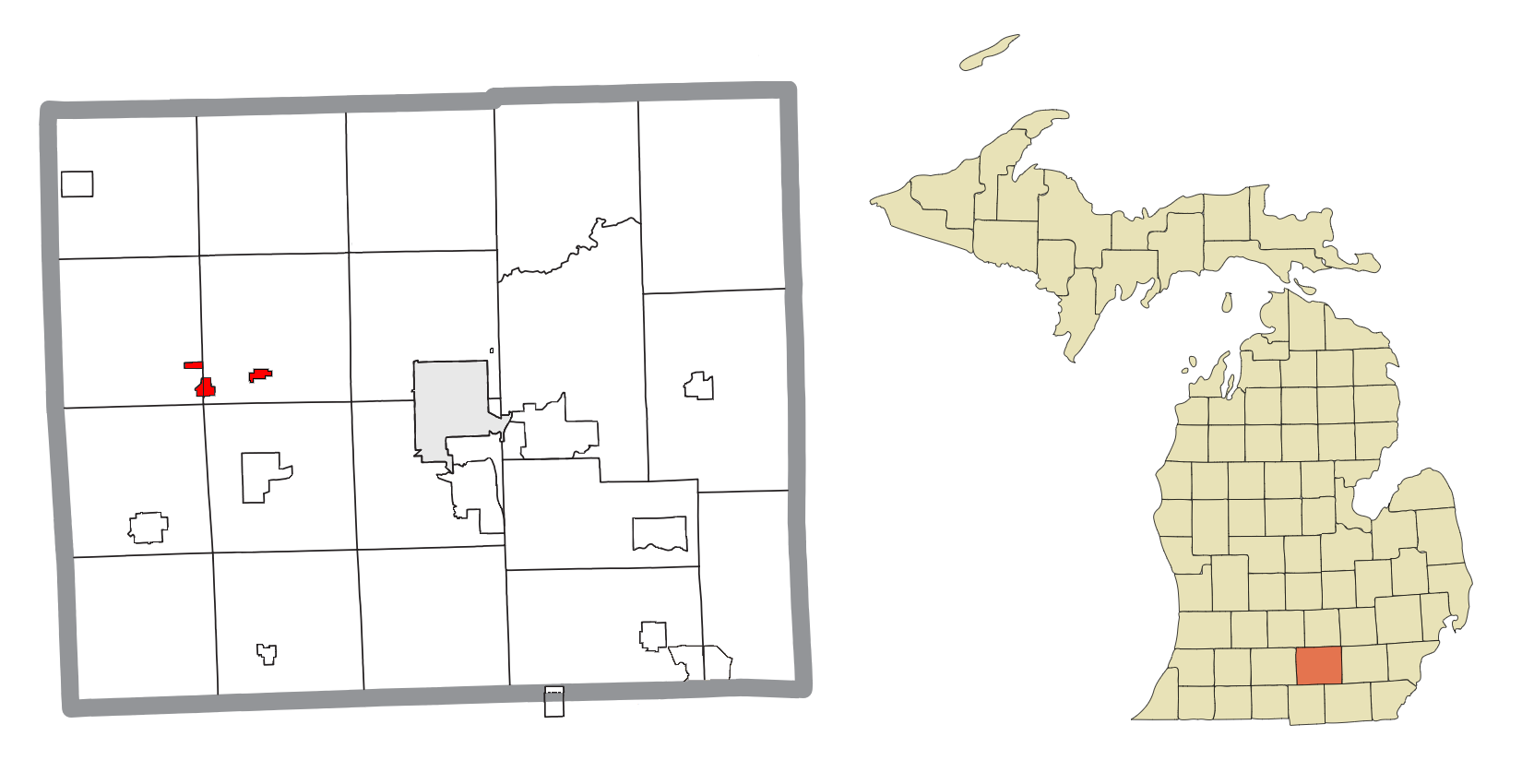
- Location within Jackson County

- Location within the state of Michigan
- Coordinates: 42°15′30″N 84°35′59″W
- Country: United States
- State: Michigan
- County: Jackson
- Townships: Parma and Sandstone
- Established: 1847

Government
  - Type: Village council
  - President: James Jenkins
  - Clerk: Joanne Havican

Area
  - Total: 1.05 sq mi (2.72 km^{2})
  - Land: 1.05 sq mi (2.72 km^{2})
  - Water: 0 sq mi (0.00 km^{2})
- Elevation: 1,001 ft (305 m)

Population (2020)
  - Total: 780
  - Density: 742.9/sq mi (286.84/km^{2})
- Time zone: UTC−5 (Eastern (EST))
  - Summer (DST): UTC−4 (EDT)
- ZIP code(s): 49269
- Area code: 517
- FIPS code: 26-62740
- GNIS feature ID: 0634419
- Website: Official website

Parma is a village in Jackson County in the U.S. state of Michigan. The population was 780 at the 2020 census. The village is divided into three sections with boundaries in Parma Township and Sandstone Charter Township.

== History ==
Parma was originally located a few miles east of its current location along the Michigan Central Railroad at a stop known as Gidley's Station. When it was moved to its current location, it was known as Groveland, after a noticeable grove of trees within the town. Part of this grove still exists where Grove St. curves around a copse of trees near its intersection with Westlawn St. in the eastern half of Parma. When the village was incorporated in 1847, its name was changed to Parma. In the early 1900s Parma was also known as Cracker Hill. A book titled Cracker Hill Crumbs, about the village's history, was published in 1975.

== Geography ==
According to the United States Census Bureau, the village has a total area of 1.06 square miles (2.75 km^{2}), all land. Parma is bisected by a township line; as a result, the town lies in both Parma and Sandstone townships.

== Demographics ==
Historical population
Census	Pop.	Note	%±
1880	482		—
1890	490		1.7%
1900	420		−14.3%
1910	509		21.2%
1920	564		10.8%
1930	613		8.7%
1940	575		−6.2%
1950	680		18.3%
1960	770		13.2%
1970	880		14.3%
1980	873		−0.8%
1990	809		−7.3%
2000	907		12.1%
2010	769		−15.2%
2020	780		1.4%
U.S. Decennial Census

=== 2010 census ===
As of the census of 2010, there were 769 people, 287 households, and 207 families residing in the village. The population density was 725.5 inhabitants per square mile (280.1/km^{2}). There were 322 housing units at an average density of 303.8 per square mile (117.3/km^{2}). The racial makeup of the village was 95.8% White, 0.4% African American, 0.4% Native American, 0.9% Asian, 0.7% from other races, and 1.8% from two or more races. Hispanic or Latino of any race were 2.5% of the population.

There were 287 households, of which 41.5% had children under the age of 18 living with them, 48.8% were married couples living together, 16.4% had a female householder with no husband present, 7.0% had a male householder with no wife present, and 27.9% were non-families. 20.9% of all households were made up of individuals, and 10.1% had someone living alone who was 65 years of age or older. The average household size was 2.62 and the average family size was 3.01.

The median age in the village was 36.5 years. 29% of residents were under the age of 18; 8.9% were between the ages of 18 and 24; 22.6% were from 25 to 44; 26.7% were from 45 to 64; and 12.6% were 65 years of age or older. The gender makeup of the village was 51.5% male and 48.5% female.

=== 2000 census ===
As of the census of 2000, there were 907 people, 310 households, and 233 families residing in the village. The population density was 1,541.2 inhabitants per square mile (595.1/km^{2}). There were 317 housing units at an average density of 538.7 per square mile (208.0/km^{2}). The racial makeup of the village was 96.14% White, 0.55% African American, 0.88% Native American, 0.55% Asian, 0.66% from other races, and 1.21% from two or more races. Hispanic or Latino of any race were 1.65% of the population.

There were 310 households, out of which 43.2% had children under the age of 18 living with them, 58.7% were married couples living together, 11.9% had a female householder with no husband present, and 24.8% were non-families. 21.0% of all households were made up of individuals, and 7.1% had someone living alone who was 65 years of age or older. The average household size was 2.86 and the average family size was 3.32.

In the village, the population was spread out, with 33.7% under the age of 18, 7.2% from 18 to 24, 30.9% from 25 to 44, 19.5% from 45 to 64, and 8.7% who were 65 years of age or older. The median age was 33 years. For every 100 females, there were 104.7 males. For every 100 females age 18 and over, there were 98.3 males.

The median income for a household in the village was $39,531, and the median income for a family was $46,429. Males had a median income of $31,307 versus $24,432 for females. The per capita income for the village was $16,483. About 1.8% of families and 3.3% of the population were below the poverty line, including 2.0% of those under age 18 and 9.1% of those age 65 or over.

== Culture and community ==
Parma has two United Methodist churches: The North Parma United Methodist Church and the Parma United Methodist Church. North Parma serves the farming congregation to the north and the "Plain Parma" church serves the village congregation. North Parma is a white clapboard country church and "Plain Parma" is an orange brick church. Both churches were served by the same minister until the fall of 2005. Currently the minister assigned to the charge serves only North Parma. The two churches remained formally connected to a certain degree until 2006, when the charge was dissolved. The Parma UMC is now formally connected to the Trinity UMC in Jackson. As of 2007, North Parma remains independent, though this is not necessarily considered to be a permanent arrangement.

Spring Life Church, formerly Howe Wesleyan Church, was part of the Methodist branch in the area and was started in 1908. In October 1912, it united with the Wesleyan Methodist church and was connected with the Rives Circuit made up of Rives, Robinson and Howe schools. In 1968 it became a Wesleyan Church with the merger of the Wesleyan Methodist and Pilgrim Holiness denominations. In April 2007, the congregation voted to change its name to Spring Life Church to re-emphasize the mission of the church which is to "Cultivate, Plant, and Grow".

Other country churches in the community are Calvary Apostolic Church and Parma Baptist Church.

=== Nearby communities ===
To the southeast is the community of Spring Arbor; northwest is the village of Springport; to the east is the city of Jackson and to the west is the city of Albion and beyond the cities of Marshall and Battle Creek, all in Calhoun County.

Parma is on Old US 12, which today is known as Michigan Avenue when it runs through Parma (and most of Southern Michigan). Today, the village has two exits on I-94, which replaced US 12 as the primary route from Detroit to Chicago when the Interstate highway system was built. The segment of I-94 that services Parma was originally part of the US 12 bypass, a freeway built prior to the Interstate system that allowed motorists to bypass Jackson and Parma. This is the oldest segment of I-94, beginning at Sargent Road in East Jackson and running west to Michigan Avenue outside of Parma. This older segment of the road is identifiable by its median, which is significantly narrower than the rest of I-94.

Parma is also located on the Michigan Central Railroad, which was historically the most significant and is currently the only railway from Detroit to Chicago. At one time Parma had a regular train station, but service was discontinued in 1954, and the old train station building was torn down.

An interurban trolley formerly ran between Parma and Jackson as well. On June 23, 1923, the train derailed and slammed into the jail, which was destroyed and never rebuilt. The scene, which is still remembered by some older residents, was commemorated in 1999 as part of the elaborate "History of Parma" section of the playground at Groner Park. The interurban station serves as the current library.

== Education ==
The Parma Union School District served the village and surrounding rural areas until 1957, when it consolidated with other school districts to form the Western School District. In 2026, Warner Elementary (built 1951), Parma Elementary (built 1953), and Bean Elementary (built 1960) were closed and consolidated into the newly built Western Elementary, which opened on February 3, 2026. Spring Arbor University is located about six miles (9.7 km) away, while Albion College is nine miles (14 km) distant. Parma is also served by Jackson College, located approximately 17 miles (27 km) away.

== Industry and commerce ==
Parma is historically and traditionally an agricultural community, and most of the surrounding area remains used for that purpose. During the turn of the century, the farming atmosphere has been eroded by hints of urban sprawl from the area, as well as a general decline in the viability of family farming.

A handful of manufacturing firms in the area have been constructed, located mostly along the U.S. Route 12 and Interstate 94 corridor In 1989, the Michigan Automotive Compressors, Inc. (MACI), an automotive parts plant owned jointly by two Japanese parent companies, Toyota Motor Corporation, and Denso was built. According to the company's webpage, MACI specializes in the manufacturing of automotive air conditioning compressors with a magnetic clutch, used in the production of various brands of cars.

== Notable people ==
- Robert E. Horton, ecologist and soil scientist
- Brian Tyler, NASCAR driver
