= Spring Arbor, Michigan =

- Census-designated place (CDP) & unincorporated community
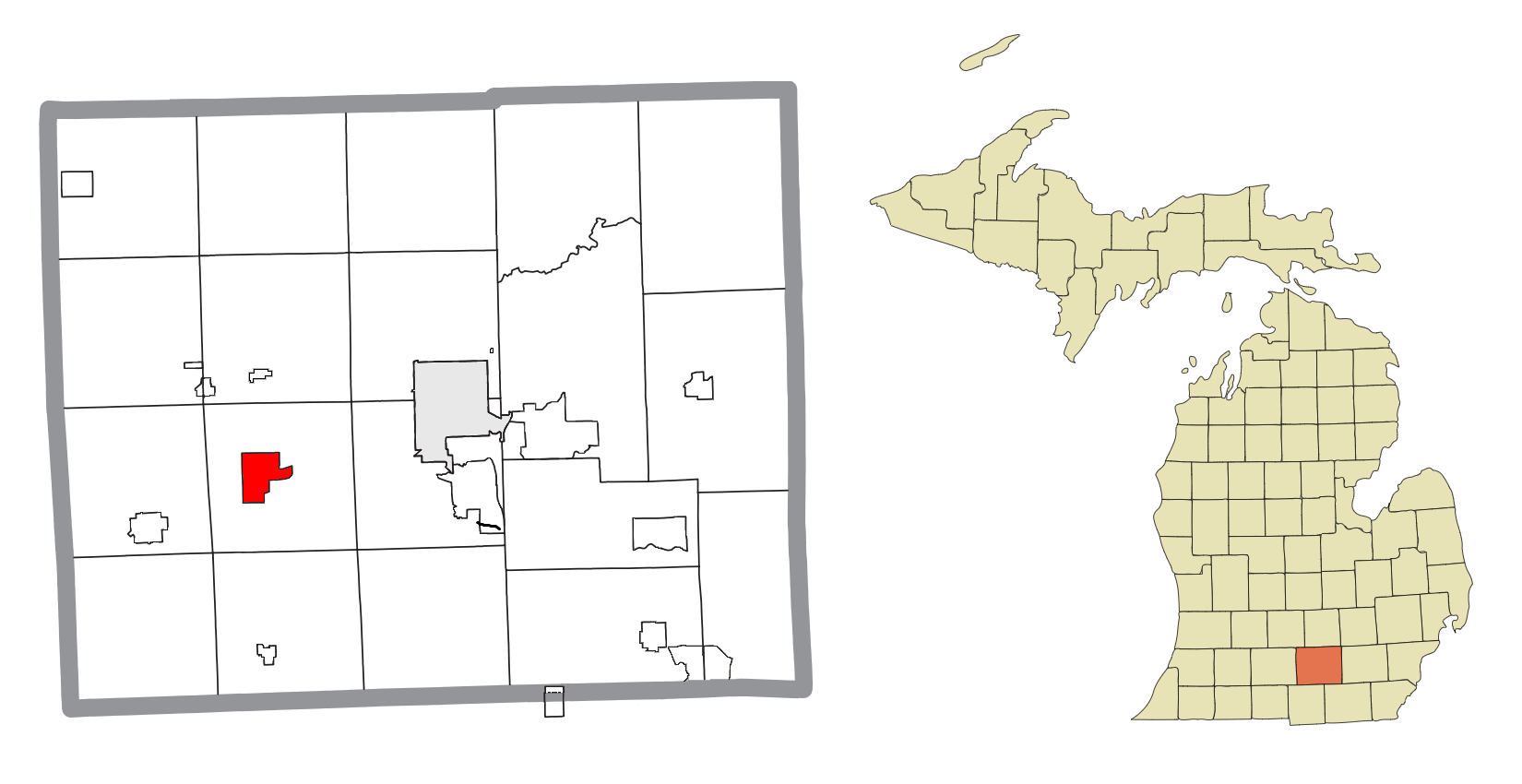
- Location within Jackson County

- Location within the state of Michigan Spring Arbor (the United States)
- Coordinates: 42°12′18″N 84°33′10″W
- Country: United States
- State: Michigan
- County: Jackson
- Township: Spring Arbor

Area
  - Total: 2.81 sq mi (7.28 km^{2})
  - Land: 2.78 sq mi (7.19 km^{2})
  - Water: 0.035 sq mi (0.09 km^{2})
- Elevation: 1,001 ft (305 m)

Population (2020)
  - Total: 2,916
  - Density: 1,050/sq mi (405.4/km^{2})
- Time zone: UTC-5 (Eastern (EST))
  - Summer (DST): UTC-4 (EDT)
- ZIP code(s): 49283
- Area code: 517
- FIPS code: 26-75620
- GNIS feature ID: 638533

Spring Arbor is an unincorporated community and census-designated place (CDP) in Jackson County in the U.S. state of Michigan. As of the 2020 census, Spring Arbor had a population of 2,916. The CDP is located within Spring Arbor Township.

Spring Arbor is the home of Spring Arbor University, a liberal arts university affiliated with the Free Methodist Church.

== History ==
Potawatomi Native Americans resided in present-day Spring Arbor in three known aboriginal villages until their removal to reservations near Green Bay, Wisconsin.

Organized by Territorial Council in 1832, Spring Arbor Township has continued to exist with its present boundaries since 1837. Spring Arbor was first spelled Spring Arbour on all early maps.

During the mid-19th century, a Village of Spring Arbour had been planned along what is now the intersection of Cross and Hammond roads in the southwest portion of the township. The development of such a village began but ended with the departure of the Free Will Baptists' seminary to what is now Hillsdale College. Remnants of this plot are clearly visible on an aerial view of the area: a portion of Matthews Road continues along a street directed at the intersections of Cross and Hammond. Falling Waters Park can be found at this former establishment with historical information about the area including the Potawatomi village, the founding of the village of Spring Arbor, the 1835 founding of what would eventually become Albion College, and the 1844 founding of the predecessor of both Hillsdale College and Spring Arbor University.

== Geography ==
According to the United States Census Bureau, the CDP has a total area of 2.81 square miles (7.28 km^{2}), of which 2.78 square miles (7.20 km^{2}) is land and 0.03 square miles (0.08 km^{2}) (1.07%) is water.

Spring Arbor is in western Jackson County in the center of Spring Arbor Township. State highway M-60 passes through the center of town, leading northeast 9 miles (14 km) to Jackson, the county seat, and southwest 24 miles (39 km) to Tekonsha.

Spring Arbor is well known for its artesian water springs which form several small lakes, creeks and rivers. Lime Lake County Park is located on 2 acres (0.81 ha) in Spring Arbor including a boat launch, a swimming area, playground equipment, and the Falling Waters Trail. The lake was created by the quarrying of marl, a calcium carbonate or lime-rich mud used to make concrete. Divers frequent this lake to view bizarre underwater mountains, pillars, and spires left behind from concrete production.

== Demographics ==
Historical population
Census	Pop.	Note	%±
2020	2,916		—
U.S. Decennial Census

=== 2020 census ===
As of the 2020 census, Spring Arbor had a population of 2,916. The median age was 22.0 years. 11.0% of residents were under the age of 18 and 18.8% of residents were 65 years of age or older. For every 100 females there were 100.0 males, and for every 100 females age 18 and over there were 104.7 males age 18 and over.

0.0% of residents lived in urban areas, while 100.0% lived in rural areas.

There were 800 households in Spring Arbor, of which 26.0% had children under the age of 18 living in them. Of all households, 47.1% were married-couple households, 13.5% were households with a male householder and no spouse or partner present, and 36.8% were households with a female householder and no spouse or partner present. About 37.5% of all households were made up of individuals and 25.7% had someone living alone who was 65 years of age or older.

There were 867 housing units, of which 7.7% were vacant. The homeowner vacancy rate was 0.7% and the rental vacancy rate was 11.4%.

Racial composition as of the 2020 census
Race	Number	Percent
White	2,672	91.6%
Black or African American	57	2.0%
American Indian and Alaska Native	16	0.5%
Asian	15	0.5%
Native Hawaiian and Other Pacific Islander	2	0.1%
Some other race	18	0.6%
Two or more races	136	4.7%
Hispanic or Latino (of any race)	153	5.2%

=== 2000 census ===
As of the census of 2000, there were 2,188 people, 643 households, and 367 families residing in the CDP. The population density was 792.2 inhabitants per square mile (305.9/km^{2}). There were 682 housing units at an average density of 246.9 per square mile (95.3/km^{2}). The racial makeup of the CDP was 95.34% White, 1.83% African American, 0.23% Native American, 1.19% Asian, 0.32% Pacific Islander, 0.27% from other races, and 0.82% from two or more races. 1.10% of the population were Hispanic or Latino of any race.

There were 643 households, out of which 25.3% had children under the age of 18 living with them, 48.7% were married couples living together, 6.7% had a female householder with no husband present, and 42.9% were non-families. 38.9% of all households were made up of individuals, and 23.8% had someone living alone who was 65 years of age or older. The average household size was 2.24 and the average family size was 3.04.

In the CDP, the population was spread out, with 16.0% under the age of 18, 31.8% from 18 to 24, 16.9% from 25 to 44, 14.4% from 45 to 64, and 21.0% who were 65 years of age or older. The median age was 28 years. For every 100 females, there were 72.3 males. For every 100 females age 18 and over, there were 67.1 males.

The median income for a household in the CDP was $38,750, and the median income for a family was $67,647. Males had a median income of $42,500 versus $26,510 for females. The per capita income for the CDP was $14,490. 8.9% of the population and 6.7% of families were below the poverty line. Out of the total people living in poverty, 7.8% are under the age of 18 and 9.3% are 65 or older.

== Education ==
Two K-12 school districts cover the CDP:

- Western School District
- Concord Community Schools

Trinity Lutheran School serves grades K-8 and is located in the northeast quarter of the township. It is affiliated with the Lutheran Church–Missouri Synod.

Spring Arbor University is located in the community. Established in 1873 as a seminary of the Free Methodist Church, it later became a high school, followed by a junior college, then a college and finally a university on April 30, 2001.

Jackson College also serves the township.

== Commerce and industry ==
There are several nursing homes, retirement centers and assisted living centers in the community, all run by the Todd Ganton and Matt Gregory families.

Spring Arbor University (a private university affiliated with the Free Methodist Church) employs approximately 275 staff and faculty on its main campus as of September 2004, which is the largest employer located in the community.

CMS Energy employs a large number of Spring Arbor residents, but is located in Jackson.
