= Parma Township, Michigan =

- Civil township
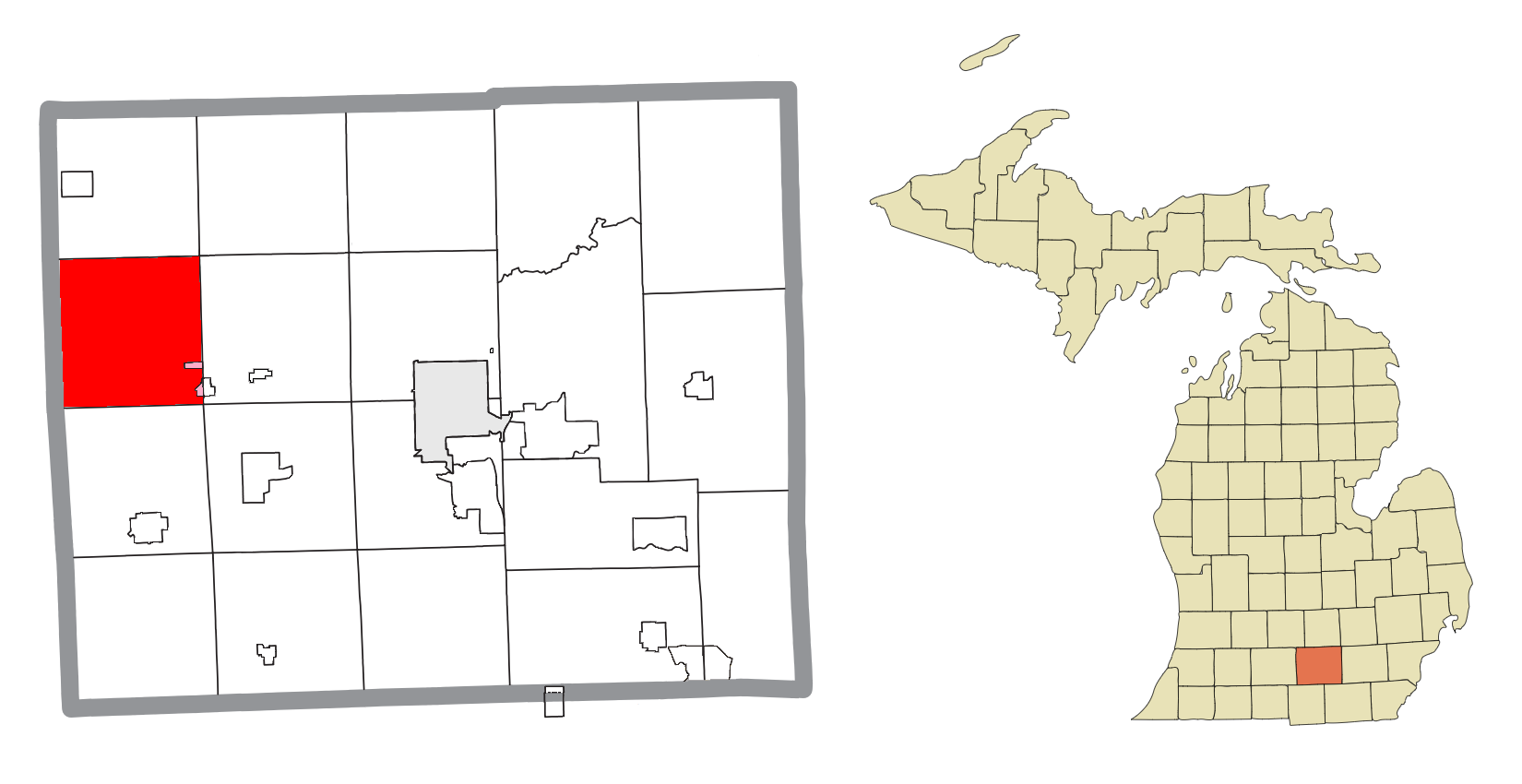
- Location within Jackson County (red) and administered portions of the Parma village (pink)

- Location within the state of Michigan Parma Township (the United States)
- Coordinates: 42°16′32″N 84°39′41″W
- Country: United States
- State: Michigan
- County: Jackson

Government
  - Supervisor: Wendy Chamberlain
  - Clerk: Donald Spangler

Area
  - Total: 36.40 sq mi (94.3 km^{2})
  - Land: 36.30 sq mi (94.0 km^{2})
  - Water: 0.10 sq mi (0.26 km^{2})
- Elevation: 950 ft (290 m)

Population (2020)
  - Total: 2,668
  - Density: 73.50/sq mi (28.38/km^{2})
- Time zone: UTC-5 (Eastern (EST))
  - Summer (DST): UTC-4 (EDT)
- ZIP code(s): 49224 (Albion); 49269 (Parma); 49284 (Springport)
- Area code: 517
- FIPS code: 26-62760
- GNIS feature ID: 1626884
- Website: Official website

Parma Township is a civil township of Jackson County in the U.S. state of Michigan. The population was 2,668 at the 2020 census.

== Communities ==
- Devereaux is an unincorporated community in the township established in 1872.
- Parma is a village at the southeast corner of the township, partially within Sandstone Charter Township to the east.

== Geography ==
According to the United States Census Bureau, the township has a total area of 36.40 square miles (94.28 km^{2}), of which 36.30 square miles (94.02 km^{2}) is land and 0.10 square miles (0.26 km^{2}) (0.27%) is water.

Parma Township is in western Jackson County, bordered on its west side by Calhoun County. Interstate 94 passes through the township, with access from four exits. I-94 leads west 6 miles (10 km) to Albion and east 14 miles (23 km) to Jackson. Most of the township drains west as part of the Kalamazoo River watershed, while the northeast part of the township is within the Grand River watershed.

== Demographics ==
As of the census of 2000, there were 2,696 people, 943 households, and 742 families residing in the township. The population density was 74.2 inhabitants per square mile (28.6/km^{2}). There were 1,001 housing units at an average density of 27.6 per square mile (10.7/km^{2}). The racial makeup of the township was 93.58% White, 3.64% African American, 0.85% Native American, 0.15% Asian, 0.07% Pacific Islander, 0.74% from other races, and 0.96% from two or more races. Hispanic or Latino of any race were 1.93% of the population.

There were 943 households, out of which 37.4% had children under the age of 18 living with them, 64.5% were married couples living together, 10.0% had a female householder with no husband present, and 21.3% were non-families. 16.9% of all households were made up of individuals, and 5.9% had someone living alone who was 65 years of age or older. The average household size was 2.82 and the average family size was 3.17.

In the township the population was spread out, with 27.6% under the age of 18, 7.6% from 18 to 24, 28.4% from 25 to 44, 26.1% from 45 to 64, and 10.2% who were 65 years of age or older. The median age was 38 years. For every 100 females, there were 101.0 males. For every 100 females age 18 and over, there were 100.8 males.

The median income for a household in the township was $48,510, and the median income for a family was $53,315. Males had a median income of $37,361 versus $25,568 for females. The per capita income for the township was $19,026. About 4.5% of families and 7.1% of the population were below the poverty line, including 10.1% of those under age 18 and 6.7% of those age 65 or over.
