= Nottawa Creek =

Location
- Country: United States

Physical characteristics
- Source
  - location: Nottawa Lake in Calhoun County, Michigan
- Mouth
  - location: St. Joseph River
- Discharge
  - location: mouth
  - average: 184.45 cu ft/s (5.223 m^{3}/s) (estimate)

Nottawa Creek (also known as Nottawa River, Nottawaseepe River, and Nottawaseppe River) is a 33.9-mile-long (54.6 km) stream in the U.S. state of Michigan that flows into the St. Joseph River at 42°00′15″N 85°23′40″W, approximately three miles east of the village of Mendon.

The Nottawa is formed by the outflow of Nottawa Lake in south central Calhoun County. The lake is fed by Nottawa Drain, which along with Goose Pond Drain drains an area to the east of the lake. The Nottawa Creek flows northwest from the lake then arcs to the southwest and flows through the village of Athens before joining the St. Joseph River.

The Nottawa Creek system drains all or portions of the following townships:

- In Calhoun County
  - Athens Township
  - Burlington Township
  - Clarendon Township
  - Eckford Township
  - Fredonia Township
  - Leroy Township (via Pine Creek)
  - Newton Township
  - Tekonsha Township
- In Branch County
  - Sherwood Township
- In Kalamazoo County
  - Climax Township (via Bear Creek)
  - Wakeshma Township (via Bear Creek)
- In St. Joseph County
  - Leonidas Township

== Tributaries ==
- (left) Bear Creek
- (left) Pine Creek
  - (right) Histand Drain
  - (left) Waterman Drain
    - (left) Miller and Melody Drain
  - (right) Houghton Drain
  - Cotton Lake
- (right) Rowe and Wallace Drain
- (right) French Drain
- (right) Alder Creek
- (left) Mud Creek
  - (right) Yost Francisco Drain
    - Hyde Lake
- (right) Gleason Drain
- (left) unnamed drain
  - Fish Lake
  - Lyon Lake
  - Long Lake
  - Pine Lake
- Nottawa Lake
  - Klingaman Lake
  - Nottawa Drain
    - (left) Goose Pond Drain

== See also ==
- Nottawaseppi Huron Band of Potawatomi
- Notawasepe Potawatamie Reservation
