= Michigan's 63rd House of Representatives district =

American legislative district

Michigan's 63rd State House of Representatives district
Representative
Jay DeBoyer; R–Clay
- Demographics: 87.7% White; 4% Black; 2.9% Hispanic; 1% Asian; 0.1% Native American; 0.3% Other; 4.1% Multiracial
- Population (2024): 91,729

Michigan's 63rd House of Representatives district (also referred to as Michigan's 63rd House district) is a legislative district within the Michigan House of Representatives located in part of Macomb and St. Clair counties. The district was created in 1965, when the Michigan House of Representatives district naming scheme changed from a county-based system to a numerical one.

== List of representatives ==
Representative	Party	Dates	Residence	Notes
Robert James Slingerlend	Democratic	1965–1966	Lake Orion	
Donald E. Bishop	Republican	1967–1970	Rochester	
James Damman	Republican	1971–1974	Troy	
Ruth McNamee	Republican	1975–1982	Birmingham	
Gordon R. Sparks	Republican	1983–1992	Troy	
Donald H. Gilmer	Republican	1993–1998	Augusta	
Jerry VanderRoest	Republican	1999–2002	Galesburg	
Lorence Wenke	Republican	2003–2008	Richland	
Jase Bolger	Republican	2009–2014	Marshall	Served as House Speaker from 2011 to 2014.
David Maturen	Republican	2015–2018	Vicksburg	Lived in Portage until around 2017.
Matt Hall	Republican	2019–2022	Battle Creek	
Jay DeBoyer	Republican	2023–present	Clay	
Pamela Hornberger	Republican	(Note: Member-elect.)	Chesterfield Township	

== Recent elections ==
=== 2020s ===
2026 Michigan House of Representatives election
Party	Candidate	Votes	%
Republican	Pamela Hornberger	28,886	62.83
Democratic	Jamie Sonneberger	17,092	37.17
Total votes		45,978	100
Republican hold			

2024 Michigan House of Representatives election
Party	Candidate	Votes	%
Republican	Jay DeBoyer	37,308	67.7
Democratic	Robert Kelly-McFarland	17,801	32.3
Total votes		55,108	100
Republican hold			

2022 Michigan House of Representatives election
Party	Candidate	Votes	%
Republican	Jay DeBoyer	28,050	64.3
Democratic	Kelly Noland	15,598	35.7
Total votes		43,648	100
Republican hold			

2020 Michigan House of Representatives election
Party	Candidate	Votes	%
Republican	Matt Hall	31,379	60.6
Democratic	Luke Howell	18,613	36.0
Libertarian	Rafael Wolf	1,093	2.1
Green	John Anthony La Pietra	660	1.3
Democratic	Ron Hawkins (Write-in)	6	0.0
Total votes		51,751	100
Republican hold			

2018 Michigan House of Representatives election
Party	Candidate	Votes	%
Republican	Matt Hall	22,711	56.6
Democratic	Jennifer Aniano	15,809	39.4
Libertarian	Ronald Hawkins	1,059	2.6
Green	John Anthony La Pietra	557	1.4
Total votes		40,136	100
Republican hold			

2016 Michigan House of Representatives election
Party	Candidate	Votes	%
Republican	David Maturen	26,878	60.9
Democratic	Lynn Shiflea	14,749	33.4
Green	John Anthony La Pietra	2,523	5.7
Total votes		44,150	100
Republican hold			

2014 Michigan House of Representatives election
Party	Candidate	Votes	%
Republican	David Maturen	16,718	56.2
Democratic	Bill Farmer	13,023	43.8
Total votes		29,741	100
Republican hold			

2012 Michigan House of Representatives election
Party	Candidate	Votes	%
Republican	Jase Bolger	22,196	50.9
Democratic	Bill Farmer	21,440	49.1
Total votes		43,636	100
Republican hold			

2010 Michigan House of Representatives election
Party	Candidate	Votes	%
Republican	Jase Bolger	20,931	62.8
Democratic	Dave Morgan	12,407	37.2
Total votes		33,338	100
Republican hold			

2008 Michigan House of Representatives election
Party	Candidate	Votes	%
Republican	Jase Bolger	27,641	56.6
Democratic	Phyllis Smith	21,179	43.4
Total votes		48,820	100
Republican hold			

== Historical district boundaries ==
Map	Description	Apportionment Plan	Notes
	Oakland County (part): Addison Township; Avon Township; Oakland Township; Orion Township; Oxford Township; Pontiac (part); Pontiac Township; Troy (part)	1964 Apportionment Plan	
	Oakland County (part): Avon Township; Birmingham; Bloomfield Township; Rochester; Royal Oak (part); Troy (part)	1972 Apportionment Plan	
	Oakland County (part): Avon Township; Rochester; Troy (part)	1982 Apportionment Plan	
	Calhoun County (part): Albion; Albion Township; Athens Township; Burlington Township; Clarence Township; Clarendon Township; Convis Township; Eckford Township; Fredonia Township; Homer Township; Lee Township; Leroy Township; Marengo Township; Marshall; Marshall Township; Newton Township; Sheridan Township; Tekonsha Township; Kalamazoo County (part): Brady Township; Charleston Township; Climax Township; Comstock Township; Galesburg; Pavilion Township; Prairie Ronde Township; Ross Township; Schoolcraft Township; Wakeshma Township	1992 Apportionment Plan	
	Calhoun County (part): Battle Creek (part); Bedford Township (part); Eckford Township (part); Emmett Township; Fredonia Township (part); Marshall (part); Marshall Township; Newton Township; Pennfield Township; Kalamazoo County (part): Brady Township; Charleston Township; Climax Township; Comstock Township; Galesburg; Pavilion Township; Richland Township; Ross Township; Schoolcraft Township; Wakeshma Township	2001 Apportionment Plan	
	Calhoun County (part): Athens Township; Burlington Township; Clarendon Township; Eckford Township; Emmett Township; Fredonia Township; Homer Township; Leroy Township; Marengo Township; Marshall; Marshall Township; Newton Township; Tekonsha Township; Kalamazoo County (part): Brady Township; Charleston Township; Climax Township; Comstock Township; Galesburg; Kalamazoo Township (part); Pavilion Township; Richland Township; Ross Township; Wakeshma Township	2011 Apportionment Plan	
