= Athens Area Schools =

School district in Michigan

Address
- 4320 K Drive S East Leroy, Calhoun County, Michigan, 49051; United States

District information
- Grades: Kindergarten–12
- Superintendent: Kipp Beaudoin
- Schools: 2
- Budget: $7,486,000 2022–2023 expenditures
- NCES District ID: 2603510

Students and staff
- Students: 455 (2024–2025)
- Teachers: 49.9 (on an FTE basis) (2024–2025)
- Staff: 92.32 FTE (2024–2025)
- Student–teacher ratio: 9.12 (2024–2025)
- District mascot: Indians

Other information
- Website: www.athensk12.org

Athens Area Schools is a public school district in West Michigan. In Calhoun County, it serves Athens, East Leroy, and parts of the townships of Athens, Burlington, Leroy, and Newton. In Branch County, it serves part of Sherwood Township. In Kalamazoo County, it serves part of Wakeshma Township. In St. Joseph County, it serves part of Leonidas Township.

== History ==
Athens' former school building was built in 1910. The Battle Creek fire department saved the building on October 23, 1925, when a fire burned the top two floors. School was held in temporary quarters while the building was repaired.

The current Athens Junior/Senior High School opened in fall 1953.

The 2010-2011 school year began with several changes to district buildings. The middle school closed and sixth grade joined the elementary school, and seventh and eighth grade joined the high school. The middle school gymnasium remains in use by the district. In fall 2011, sixth grade joined the high school, using space created by a new addition to the building. The facility improvements were funded by a $2.74 million bond issue in 2010, part of a long-term cost reduction strategy.

== Schools ==
Schools in Athens Area Schools
School	Address	Notes
Athens Junior/Senior High School	300 East Holcomb, Athens	Grades 6–12
East Leroy Elementary	4320 K Drive S, East Leroy	Grades K-5
