= Climax-Scotts Community Schools =

School district in Michigan, United States

Address
- 372 S. Main Street Climax, Kalamazoo County, Michigan, 49034; United States

District information
- Grades: PreKindergarten–12
- Superintendent: Doug Newington
- Schools: 3
- Budget: $9,452,000 2022–2023 expenditures
- NCES District ID: 2610020

Students and staff
- Students: 650 (2024–2025)
- Teachers: 33.68 (on an FTE basis) (2024–2025)
- Staff: 79.5 FTE (2024–2025)
- Student–teacher ratio: 19.3 (2024–2025)
- District mascot: Panthers

Other information
- Website: www.csschools.net

Climax-Scotts Community Schools is a public school district in West Michigan. In Kalamazoo County, it serves Climax, Climax Township, and parts of the townships of Charleston, Pavilion, and Wakeshma. In Calhoun County, it serves parts of Battle Creek and Leroy Township.

== History ==
The merger of school districts of the towns of Climax and Scotts was approved by voters in June 1946.

== Schools ==
Schools in Climax-Scotts Community Schools district
School	Address	Notes
Climax-Scotts Junior/Senior High School	372 S. Main Street, Climax	Grades 6-12
Climax-Scotts Elementary	11250 East QR Ave., Scotts	Grades PreK-5
Climax-Scotts Virtual Academy	372 S. Main Street, Climax	Online school
