= Laura Spurr =

Native American leader (1945–2010)

Laura Wesley Spurr

Tribal Chairwoman, Nottawaseppi Huron Band of Potawatomi leader

Personal details
- Born: Laura Alonzo Wesley; August 10, 1945 Battle Creek, Michigan, US
- Died: February 19, 2010 (aged 64) Murrieta, California, US
- Resting place: East Alstead, New Hampshire
- Spouse: Stephen Spurr
- Children: 2
- Education: Bachelor's degree, nursing, University of Michigan, 1971; Master's degree, nursing administration and education DePaul University
- Known for: Development of FireKeepers Casino, homes, a health center and a community center on the Pine Creek Indian Reservation; forty years in nursing.
- Awards: Honored as one of two "Tribal Leaders of the Year" for 2009, by the Native American Finance Officers Association

Laura Spurr (August 10, 1945 – February 19, 2010) was the American chairwoman of the Nottawaseppi Huron Band of Potawatomi, a federally recognized Potawatomi tribe based in Calhoun County, Michigan, from 2003 until her death in 2010.

== Biography ==
=== Personal life and career ===
Spurr was born Laura Alonzo Wesley in Battle Creek, Michigan, on August 10, 1945, but was raised in Athens, Michigan. She attended Athens High School before earning a bachelor's degree in nursing on a scholarship to the University of Michigan in 1971. She married her husband, Stephen Spurr, on March 13, 1971.

Spurr began her nursing career at the University of Michigan Medical Center in Ann Arbor. She worked in nursing for more than forty years throughout the United States, including New York City, Washington D.C., Chicago and Grosse Pointe, Michigan. She taught nursing at Saint Vincent's Catholic Medical Center in Greenwich Village, New York City, beginning in 1971. She relocated with her husband to Washington D.C., where she worked as a nurse administrator, teacher and nurse. Spurr moved with her family back to Michigan in 1987, where she worked at a Detroit hospital.

She received a master's degree in nursing administration and education from DePaul University, later working as supervisor and administrator.

=== Nottawaseppi Huron Band of Potawatomi ===
Spurr joined the Nottawaseppi Tribal Council in 1999. She became chairman of the Nottawaseppi Huron Band of Potawatomi from 2000 until 2001, before becoming the tribe's treasurer from 2001 until 2003. Spurr once again became the Nottawaseppi Huron Band's chairwoman in 2003, a position she held until February 2010.

Spurr worked for more than a decade to place the Nottawaseppi Huron Band's land in a federal trust and to build the FireKeepers Casino on the reservation in Battle Creek. Spurr oversaw much of the development of the $300 million FireKeepers Casino, which opened in Emmett Township, Michigan, on August 5, 2009.

A resident of Grosse Pointe Park in Metro Detroit, Spurr drove to the tribe's headquarters near Athens, in western Michigan, for business where she worked on the Nottawaseppi Huron Band's behalf for 60 to 70 hours per week as chairwoman. She represented the tribe as the United States Environmental Protection Agency's National Tribal Operations Committee. Spurr also created health and education committees for the tribal government and launched a scholarship program. She also helped to develop residential homes, a health center and a community center on the Pine Creek Indian Reservation.

On February 10, 2009, the Native American Finance Officers Association honored her as one of its two "Tribal Leaders of the Year" for her efforts to develop the FireKeepers Casino. The award honors two Native Americans who positively influence their communities through "perseverance, creativity and outstanding public service."

In late February 2010, Spurr travelled to California to present the design and construction plans of the FireKeepers Casino at a conference held at the Pechanga Resort and Casino on the Pechanga Band of Luiseño Indians reservation. Spurr collapsed from cardiopulmonary arrest on Thursday, February 18, 2010, shortly after completing her presentation to the conference. She was taken to the Rancho Springs Medical Center in Murrieta, California, where she died on Friday afternoon February 19, 2010, at the age of 64.

Her husband was Stephen J. Spurr, an economics professor at Wayne State University; they had two sons. Spurr and her husband were residents of Grosse Pointe Park at the time of her death.

Spurr was buried at a family burial plot in East Alstead, New Hampshire, following her funeral, which included a pipe ceremony.

== See also ==
- List of Native American politicians
- Native American women in politics
