= Leroy Township, Michigan =

Leroy Township may refer to the following places in the U.S. state of Michigan:

- Leroy Township, Calhoun County, Michigan
- Leroy Township, Ingham County, Michigan
- LeRoy Township, Michigan in Osceola County

== See also ==
- Leroy, Presque Isle County, Michigan, unincorporated community in Krakow Township
- LeRoy, Michigan, village and post office in Osceola County
- Leroy Township (disambiguation)
