= Jase Bolger =

American politician (born 1971)

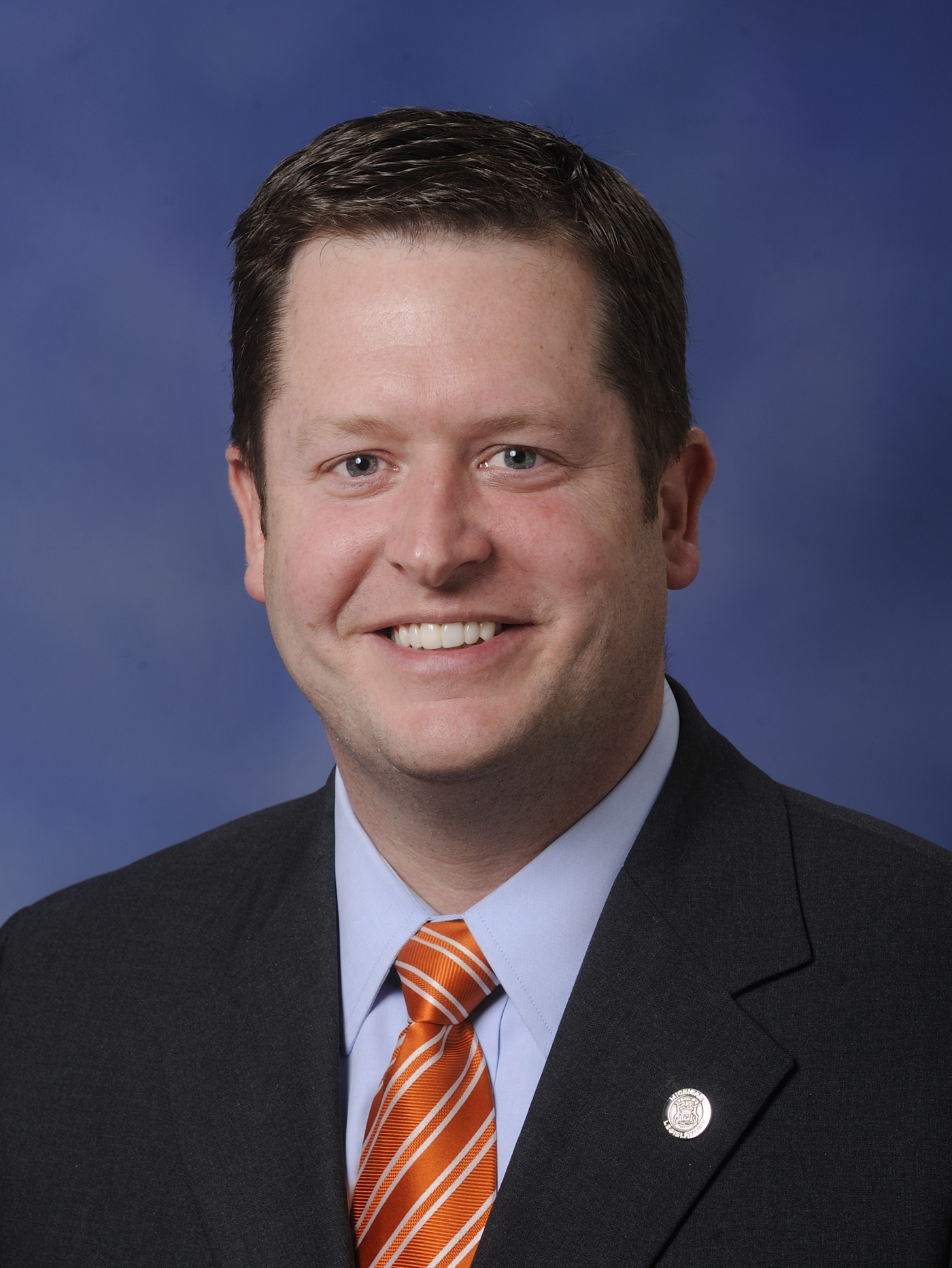
- Bolger in 2010

Chair; Michigan Civil Service Commission Elected on April 27, 2023
- In office December 29, 2016 – December 31, 2024
- Governor: Gretchen Whitmer; Rick Snyder
- Preceded by: Janet McClelland
- Succeeded by: David Berridge

71st Speaker of the Michigan House of Representatives
- In office January 1, 2011 – December 31, 2014
- Preceded by: Andy Dillon
- Succeeded by: Kevin Cotter

Member of the Michigan House of Representatives from the 63rd district
- In office January 1, 2009 – December 31, 2014
- Preceded by: Lorence Wenke
- Succeeded by: David Maturen

Personal details
- Born: February 2, 1971 (age 55) Grand Rapids, Michigan, U.S.
- Party: Republican
- Spouse: Molly Bolger (m. 1993)
- Children: 2
- Education: Western Michigan University (BBA)

James "Jase" Bolger (born February 2, 1971) served as the 71st Speaker of the Michigan House of Representatives from January 12, 2011 to the end of 2014 session. Bolger is a member of the Republican Party, and represented Michigan's 63rd house district from 2009 to 2014. After being term limited out, he founded a consulting firm, Tusker Strategies. Bolger was also appointed by former Governor Rick Snyder on December 29, 2016 to the Michigan Civil Service Commission and was elected chair on April 27, 2023 and served until December 31, 2024. Bolger was named President and CEO of the West Michigan Policy Forum on May 19, 2025.

== Personal life, education and career ==
James "Jase" Bolger was born in Grand Rapids, Michigan, the son of James and Eileen Bolger. Due to his father's job as a Michigan State Police trooper, the family moved around the state often, before settling in Charlotte, Michigan when Jase entered first grade. He graduated Western Michigan University with a Bachelor of Business Administration with a dual major in Finance and Political Science.

Prior to entering politics, Bolger founded (and continues to help operate) a small collections/skip tracing business that updates phone records for Fortune 100 companies. An Eagle Scout, he has also been associated with AYSO Soccer, the Rotary Club, United Way, the KAAAP mentor program, Oaklawn Hospital, the Knights of Columbus and several Chambers of Commerce. He is married and has two children. Bolger and his family are Roman Catholic.

== Political career ==
Bolger was first elected to public office in 2004 as a Calhoun County Commissioner, he was later reelected for the same post in 2006. One of his stated priorities as a Commissioner was to minimize the county's spending which he believed was necessary to secure the county's future. During his time as county commissioner Bolger worked with the Democratic majority to achieve consolidation for three 911 Calhoun County dispatchers. The consolidation of the Battle Creek, Albion and Marshall centers into a single center, located in Marshall, resulted in improved service and a net saving of $1.5 million for local taxpayers.

Bolger was first elected as a State Representative in November 2008, when he defeated Democratic nominee Phyllis Smith by a 13-point margin. He was subsequently reelected in 2010 and 2012 and served as Speaker until 2014. In 2012, Democrats campaigned heavily trying to defeat Bolger, spending nearly $1 million on mail, television and radio attack ads; however, Bolger won re-election to his third and final term.

Under Bolger's leadership, Republicans retained their majority in the Michigan House while President Barack Obama was re-elected by a 9.5 point margin in Michigan, and U.S. Senator Debbie Stabenow was re-elected by a 20-point margin.

He represented Michigan's 63rd legislative District, which included the eastern Kalamazoo County city of Galesburg and the townships of Brady, Charleston, Climax, Comstock, Kalamazoo, Pavilion, Richland, Ross and Wakeshma; as well as the central/southern Calhoun County city of Marshall, village of Athens, Burlington, Homer, Tekonsha and the townships of Athens, Burlington, Clarendon, Eckford, Emmett, Fredonia, Homer, Leroy, Marengo, Marshall, Newton and Tekonsha.

After completing his term Speaker of the Michigan House of Representatives, Bolger founded a consulting firm, Tusker Strategies. In addition to his private sector work, Bolger was appointed in 2016 to serve on the Michigan Civil Service Commission for a term ending December 31, 2024. The Commission is a bipartisan, four-member body, appointed by the governor of the state to regulate all conditions of employment for state employees. On April 27, 2023 Bolger was elected to serve as Chair of the Michigan Civil Service Commission.

== Political positions and initiatives ==
Bolger was elected as House leader in 2011, during his time as Speaker numerous legislative packages that aided Michigan's recovery passed. Specifically, the Michigan House has passed legislation to cut duplicative regulation, as well as reforming the tax structure and pension systems. In addition to those initiatives, the Speaker has worked with Republicans statewide to pass right-to-work legislation and education reform measures. The Michigan House has also passed a balanced budget ahead of schedule all four years Bolger served as Speaker.

=== Education reform ===
During Bolger's term as Speaker he achieved bipartisan support for education reform. Since 2011, the Michigan House of Representatives have passed numerous education reforms including tenure reform, expansion of cyber and charter school choices, teacher benefit reforms and early childhood development investment. During Bolger's first year as Speaker, the House passed tenure reform. Tenure reform in Michigan guaranteed students would not be left with an underperforming teacher or lose a teacher who is exceeding. Tenure reform made it easier for a school district to fire ineffective teachers, and banned the last in first out approach previously utilized.

In addition to tenure reform, Bolger and the House passed legislation that expanded school choice options, guaranteeing more students access to cyber and charter schools; the legislation passed with bipartisan support. The school choice legislation gradually lifts the cap on charter schools authorized by universities and allows for more cyber school options.

During the Speaker's term, teacher benefit reforms were also accomplished. The legislation, which is described as the biggest change in the state's teacher retirement system in a generation, allows school districts to allocate less towards retirement pensions and more towards students. School district leaders have noted the change to retirement pension requirements have been a blessing, saying the separation allows school districts to spend more on school operations. The reform also created the option for teachers to commit more towards their own retirement, or have the option for a smaller pension.

The Republican-led House under Bolger increased funding for early childhood development by $65 million in 2013 and again in 2014. The changes to funding for early childhood development have resulted in at least 16,000 more students being able to attend pre-k schooling. Regarding increased early childhood development funding Speaker Bolger said,

We should expand early childhood education opportunities as investments to help kids succeed. Those investments also will provide savings to our schools and communities years later as those students learn — and a decade later as they find success through working and don't enter our criminal justice system.

The Speaker's comments on early childhood funding were applauded by the Children's Leadership Council of Michigan.

=== Job growth ===
Michigan saw a sharp decline in the labor force starting in 2008 and lasting until 2011, which resulted in 800,000 jobs lost. In 2009, Michigan's unemployment rate hit a record-high 14.2 percent. During that same period Michigan saw its population base shrink. In 2011, Bolger worked with Republicans in the house to pass tax, education and pension reform measures, and employers have responded positively to the changes. Since the reforms were passed in 2011, more than 300,000 jobs returned to the state. During Bolger's time as Speaker from 2011 through 2014, Michigan had the fifth highest job growth in the nation, and the state's unemployment rate decreased to 6.7 percent.

==== Poverty decline ====
From 2008 until the end of 2010 under a Democrat controlled Michigan House of Representatives and Democratic Governor Jennifer Granholm, Michigan's poverty rate rose from 14.4% in 2008 up to 17.5% in 2011. When elected Speaker, Bolger stated it was the goal of Republican leaders to address our state's increasing poverty rate by creating more jobs. Specifically, Bolger stated "it has to be all about job creation.

After four years of Republican reforms led by Bolger, Governor Rick Snyder and former Senate Majority Leader Randy Richardville, Michigan saw significant economic improvement with more than 300,000 jobs added to state's economy, which aided the state's poverty rate decrease. While Bolger was Speaker, Michigan's poverty rate declined each year since 2011, from a high of 17.5% down to 16.2% in 2014.

=== Right to Work ===
In 2012, Michigan became the nation's 24th right-to-work state. Prior to passage, Speaker Bolger was the sole legislative leader who supported right-to-work when other Michigan Republicans were lukewarm on the idea. The day Bolger was elected Speaker of the Michigan House of Representatives he stated that fellow Republicans should join him in reviewing the potential for right-to-work legislation. During Bolger's term as Speaker, right-to-work legislation was introduced and passed by the House on December 6, 2012. The legislation was eventually signed by Governor Rick Snyder on December 11, 2012. Nearly six years after passage, workers in Michigan earn 8.06% less than the states that border Michigan and kept collective bargaining.

=== Tax reform and venture capital growth ===
Bolger worked with Senate Majority Leader Randy Richardville and Governor Snyder to pass tax reform in the state. The tax overhaul was the largest in 17 years, and included eliminating the Michigan Business Tax, reforming the personal income and pension tax systems. The changes in corporate tax structure have resulted in Michigan improving its corporate tax business environment from an all-time low ranking of 49th up to seventh-best in the country. Under the new tax changes, Michigan has become a top state for venture capital projects with 312 new projects in 2013. The state ranks fifth in new project development, and 10th for projects per capita.

Additionally, Bolger and the House passed legislation to improve the personal property tax system in Michigan. The personal property tax legislation, which was championed by the Lieutenant Governor Brian Calley, allows for 100 percent reimbursement to municipalities and an 80 percent reduction in business taxes based on the previous system.

=== Balancing the budget ===
When Bolger assumed his new role the state was facing a $1.8 billion budget deficit, noting the budget deficit was a concern Bolger worked with Republicans to balance the budget. Prior to becoming Speaker, Michigan saw annual budget shortfalls of $1.5 billion on average, as well as repeated government shutdowns. In his first year as Speaker, Bolger, Senate Majority Leader Randy Richardville and Governor Rick Snyder worked to pass a budget which resulted in Michigan seeing a more than $450 million surplus.

In each subsequent year the Michigan legislature has passed, and the governor has signed a balanced budget. In each of the past three years, Michigan has seen a surplus that has also helped replenish the state's Rainy Day Fund, which in 2011 had $2.2 million in reserves and now is projected to surpass $700 million in reserves for the 2014-15 fiscal year budget.

=== Detroit revitalization ===
Speaker Bolger has stated that he plans to work with legislators on both sides of the aisle to assist Detroit in its revitalization. In October 2013, the Speaker visited Detroit with state Representative Harvey Santana, a Democrat from Michigan's 9th house district, and pledged to explore ways to fight crime, lower auto insurance rates and clean up the city. After the visit Speaker Bolger met with the Michigan State Police to discuss alternatives to fighting crime, as well as discussing plans about alternative sentencing options with other legislators.

Also, since that visit the Speaker has worked with local Detroit representatives to garner support for scrap metal theft legislation and education reform. Recently, the Speaker proposed a change to Michigan's auto insurance laws, which would help reduce cost for Detroit's drivers; after promoting his proposal the Speaker met with Representatives John Olumba and Santana in an effort to create bi-partisan reform.

==== Detroit's bankruptcy and recovery ====
In May 2014, Bolger announced the formation of a special committee, House Committee on Detroit's Recovery and Michigan's Future, to help Detroit settle the largest municipal bankruptcy in history while protecting Michigan taxpayers statewide. Bolger was quoted as saying "we are putting a strong team in place to resolve this difficult issue today with a vision for a bright future." The committee introduced legislation to help Detroit avoid further bankruptcy litigation by offering a $194.8 million lump sum to the city's retirement systems. In addition to the one-time contribution, legislation was passed to create an oversight commission to aid Detroit's recovery.

The Speaker also called on unions to make contributions to help in the Detroit settlement. Bolger requested unions to make a material contribution that is reflective of other parties involved in the settlement. Bolger's request did not come without opposition, the Detroit Free Press issued an editorial claiming Governor Rick Snyder should convince Speaker Bolger to drop his demand or go around Bolger. The Detroit News editorialized that the union contribution demand was too much, and the likelihood of unions contributing would be slim. Other critics wrote that Bolger's demand would imperil the settlement. Bolger did receive support from conservative columnists and was urged to continue his demand. Bolger held firm to his request, and unions - the first was The Michigan Building and Construction Trades Council - did agree to make material contributions towards health care costs to help with the Detroit bankruptcy settlement. After unions agreed to contribution money towards the settlement, the Michigan House passed legislation with major bipartisan support.

Governor Snyder called the legislative package an opportunity to change the direction of Detroit. Upon passage, the Detroit News called the final legislative package a "grand piece of work", and the Detroit Free Press opined that the deal showed that lawmakers "get it".

== Political controversies ==
=== 2012: HB 5711 floor debate ===
On June 13, 2012, Speaker Bolger allegedly refused to recognize now former Michigan state legislator Lisa Brown for a full service day after she used the term "vagina" during a floor debate over a bill (HB 5711) to further regulate abortion in the state. Initially, Brown claimed she was denied the opportunity to speak due to religious discrimination, and then later claimed she was silenced for saying "vagina."

A spokesman for Bolger said that Brown was not allowed to give her opinion on a school employee retirement bill because when Brown said "Mr. Speaker, I'm flattered that you're all are so interested in my vagina, but no means no", she had violated the rules of the House and had "failed to maintain the decorum of the House."

=== 2012: Party switch controversy ===
In 2012, Bolger worked with then-Democratic Michigan state Rep. Roy Schmidt to switch parties at the filing deadline. Schmidt expressed dissatisfaction with what he called extreme party bosses in the Democratic party. Schmidt recruited a replacement for Democrats, 22-year-old Matt Mojzak, who did not mount a campaign, thus effectively leaving the Democrats without a viable candidate. With no serious Democratic candidate, Schmidt effectively ensured his victory as a Republican. Schmidt reportedly offered to pay Mojzak $450 to file as the Democratic challenger. Schmidt later upped the amount to $1,000 when Mojzak announced he was going to withdraw his candidacy.

Bolger exchanged text messages with Schmidt, which indicated he was involved in the Mojzak affair. Several independent investigations and a grand jury review exonerated Bolger of breaking any rules. Ingham County Circuit Judge Rosemarie Aquilina wrote that an exhaustive and diligent probe uncovered no crime or wrongdoing, and that an indictment was not warranted. Kent County Prosecutor Bill Forsyth condemned the scheme as a travesty but could not file charges. Bolger authored an op-ed in the Detroit Free Press offering his apology to any offended voters and noted his error in judgment.

== Electoral history ==
2008 General Election - Michigan's 63rd state House of Representatives District
Party	Candidate	Votes	%	±%
Republican	Jase Bolger	27,641	56.6	+1.4
Democratic	Phyllis Smith	21,188	43.4	−1.4

2010 General Election - Michigan's 63rd state House of Representatives District
Party	Candidate	Votes	%	±%
Republican	Jase Bolger (I)	20,935	62.8	+6.2
Democratic	Dave Morgan	12,408	37.2	−6.2

2012 General Election - Michigan's 63rd state House of Representatives District
Party	Candidate	Votes	%	±%
Republican	Jase Bolger (I)	22,196	50.9	−11.9
Democratic	Bill Farmer	21,440	49.1	+11.9

== See also ==
- List of Michigan state legislatures

Political offices
Preceded by Andy Dillon	Speaker of the Michigan House of Representatives; 2011–2014	Succeeded by Arlan Meekhof
