= Scotts, Michigan =

- Census-designated place (CDP) & unincorporated community
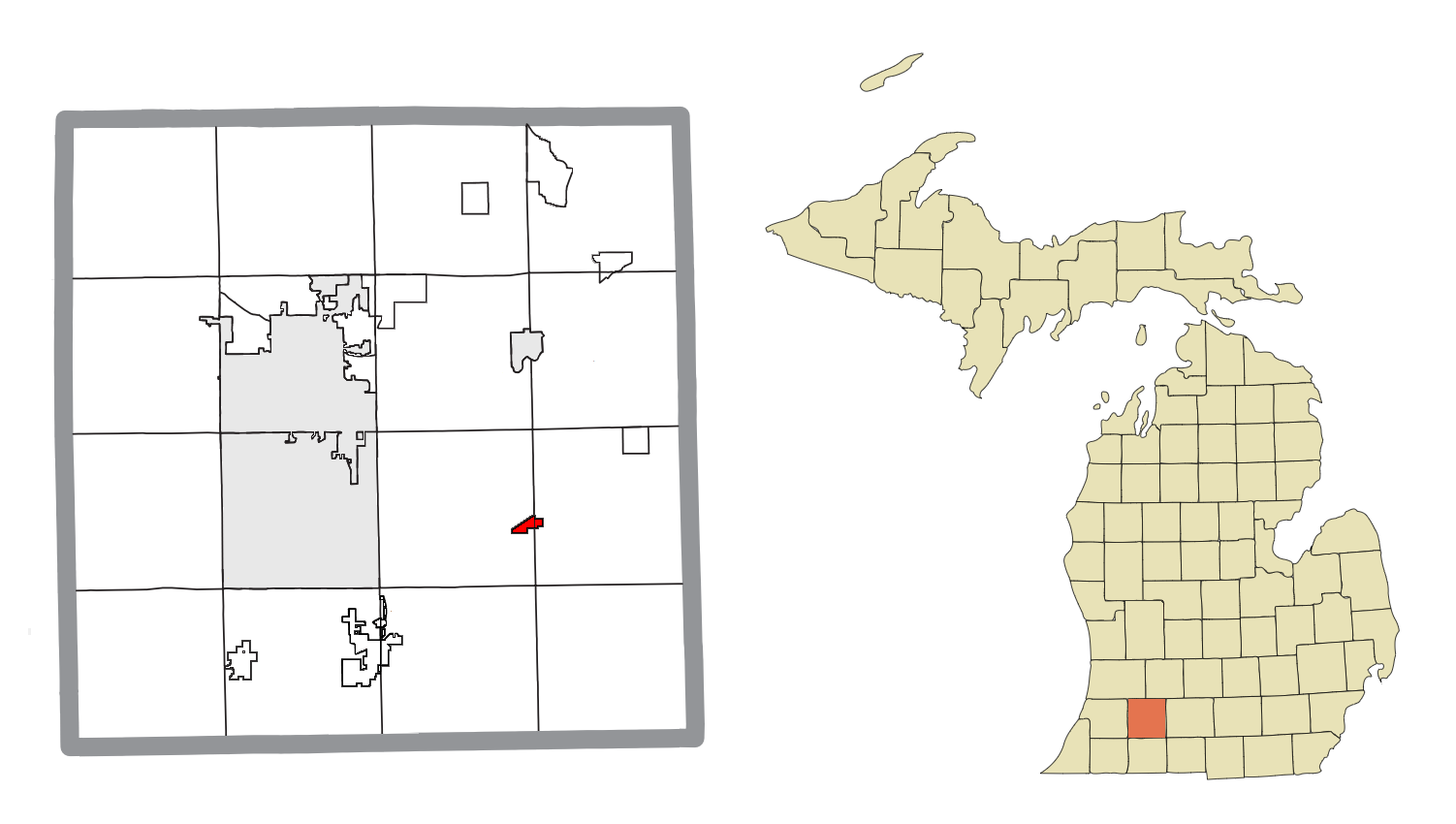
- Location within Kalamazoo County

- Location within the state of Michigan Location within the United States
- Coordinates: 42°11′45″N 85°24′47″W
- Country: United States
- State: Michigan
- County: Kalamazoo
- Townships: Climax, Pavilion

Area
  - Total: 0.24 sq mi (0.63 km^{2})
  - Land: 0.24 sq mi (0.63 km^{2})
  - Water: 0 sq mi (0.00 km^{2})
- Elevation: 915 ft (279 m)

Population (2020)
  - Total: 187
  - Density: 772/sq mi (297.9/km^{2})
- Time zone: UTC-5 (Eastern (EST))
  - Summer (DST): UTC-4 (EDT)
- ZIP code: 49088
- Area code: 269
- GNIS feature ID: 637482

Scotts is an unincorporated community and census-designated place (CDP) in Kalamazoo County in the U.S. state of Michigan. As of the 2020 census, Scotts had a population of 187. The community is located on the boundary between Climax Township and Pavilion Township.

== Demographics ==
Historical population
Census	Pop.	Note	%±
2020	187		—
U.S. Decennial Census

=== 2020 census ===
As of the 2020 United States census, the area had a population of 187 people. The racial makeup was 47.8% White, 33.0% Black, 0% Asian, 0% Native American, and 19.2% from two or more races. Hispanic or Latino people of any race were 0% of the population.

== History ==
Land at Scotts was first deeded to Dan Wheeler in 1835. Samuel Scott settled here in 1847 and the community became known as Scotts Crossing, later shortened to Scotts. A post office named Scotts opened on February 19, 1872, with Servetus Bathrick as its first postmaster. The community was platted by Bathrick in 1874.

On May 2, 2015, a 4.2 magnitude earthquake struck West Michigan, with the epicenter less than one mile NW of Scotts. The quake was felt from Wisconsin to southern Ontario, and revealed a previously unknown fault line stretching from Kalamazoo to Coldwater.

== Present ==
Scotts is situated on the boundary between Climax and Pavilion townships along the Grand Trunk Western Railroad line at 42°11′45″N 85°24′47″W, approximately 11 miles (18 km) southeast of Kalamazoo. Scotts has a post office with ZIP code 49088, which serves large portions of Climax, Pavilion, and northwest Wakeshma Township, and westward to Indian Lake and Long Lake in the city of Portage.

The center of Scotts has several businesses, including a cafe, ice cream shop, general store, and salon, as well as a township fire station. The community was home to its own K-12 school district called Scotts School until 1946, when it consolidated with the nearby school district in Climax to form Climax-Scotts Community Schools. Facilities are split between the two communities. Climax-Scotts Elementary School (K-5) is located in Scotts on the former site of Scotts High School. Climax-Scotts Jr./Sr. High School (7-12), administrative offices, bussing, and athletic facilities are located 7 miles NE in Climax. In 2006, the original school bell for Scotts School was recovered and restored, and is now on display outside the Scotts Community Center.
