= Pine Creek Indian Reservation =

- Pine Creek Potawatomi Reservation
- U.S. National Register of Historic Places
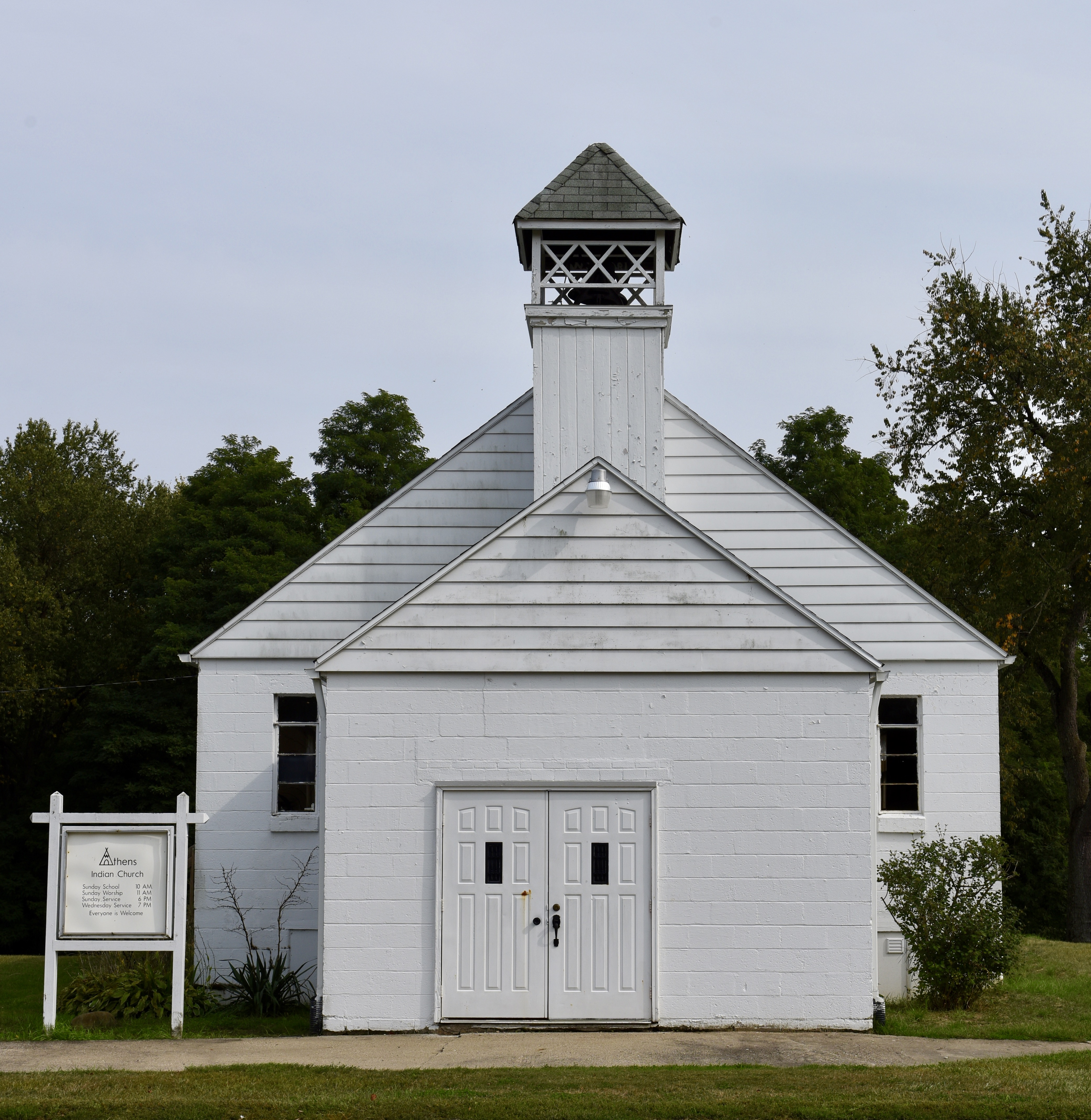
- Athens Indian Church
- Interactive map
- Location: 1485 Mno-Bmadzewen Way, Fulton, Michigan
- Coordinates: 42°06′15″N 85°15′32″W
- Area: 120 acres (49 ha)
- Built: 1845
- NRHP reference No.: 73000946
- Added to NRHP: March 30, 1973

The Pine Creek Indian Reservation is the home of the Nottawaseppi Huron Band of Potawatomi (NHBP), a federally-recognized tribe of Potawatomi in the United States. The reservation headquarters is located at 1485 Mno-Bmadzewen Way, between Fulton, Michigan and Athens, Michigan. The historic structures on the reservation were listed on the National Register of Historic Places in 1973.

== History ==
In 1838, members of the Potawatomi nation were forcibly removed from local lands to Kansas, in an operation known as the Potawatomi Trail of Death. During this removal, a group of Tribal Members escaped and returned to their native lands in Michigan. In 1845, Chief Moguago purchased a 120-acre parcel of land along the Pine Creek, and established the Pine Creek Indian Reservation. With the help of Europeans in nearby Athens, the Potawatomi constructed several houses and a school.
