= Lorence Wenke =

American politician (born 1945)

Member of the Michigan House of Representatives from the 63rd district
- In office January 1, 2003 – December 31, 2008
- Preceded by: Jerry Vander Roest
- Succeeded by: Jase Bolger

Personal details
- Born: October 9, 1945 (age 80) Kalamazoo, Michigan
- Party: Republican (until 2014); Libertarian (since 2014)
- Spouse: Nancy
- Children: 2
- Website: http://votewenke.com

Lorence R. Wenke (born October 9, 1945) is an American politician from the state of Michigan. He is a former member of the Michigan House of Representatives.

== Career ==
Wenke served in the Michigan House of Representatives. In 2004, Wenke was one of only two Republicans in the state legislature to vote against adding an amendment to the Michigan Constitution outlawing gay marriage. Tonya Schuitmaker defeated Wenke in the 2010 Republican Party primary election for the 20th district of the Michigan Senate.

With Schuitmaker running for reelection in a different district in the 2014 election, Wenke announced that he would run for the 20th district seat in September 2013. In 2014, he switched to the Libertarian Party over difference with the Republican Party on gay marriage and issues surrounding taxation. Running in the general election against Democratic Party nominee Sean McCann and Republican Party nominee Margaret O'Brien, Wenke received less than 10% of the vote. His 7,000 votes were the most for a Libertarian candidate in Kalamazoo County history.

== See also ==
- Party switching in the United States
