= Leroy Township =

Leroy Township or Le Roy Township may refer to:

== Illinois ==
- Leroy Township, Boone County, Illinois

== Iowa ==
- Leroy Township, Audubon County, Iowa
- Leroy Township, Benton County, Iowa
- Le Roy Township, Bremer County, Iowa

== Kansas ==
- Le Roy Township, Coffey County, Kansas

== Michigan ==
- Leroy Township, Calhoun County, Michigan
- Leroy Township, Ingham County, Michigan
- Le Roy Township, Osceola County, Michigan

== Minnesota ==
- Le Roy Township, Mower County, Minnesota

== Missouri ==
- Leroy Township, Barton County, Missouri

== Pennsylvania ==
- Leroy Township, Bradford County, Pennsylvania

== Ohio ==
- LeRoy Township, Lake County, Ohio

== South Dakota ==
- Le Roy Township, Lake County, South Dakota, in Lake County, South Dakota
