= David Maturen =

American politician

Rep. David Maturen

Member of the Michigan House of Representatives from the 63rd district
- In office January 1, 2015 – December 31, 2018
- Preceded by: Jase Bolger
- Succeeded by: Matt Hall

Personal details
- Born: February 8, 1948 (age 78) Bay City, Michigan
- Party: Republican
- Education: Western Michigan University

David Maturen (born February 8, 1948) is an American politician who represented the 63rd District in the Michigan House of Representatives. He was elected in November 2014 and served as vice chair of the House Tax Policy Committee and was a member of the Energy Policy, Local Government, and Transportation and Infrastructure committees. The 63rd District encompasses parts of Calhoun and Kalamazoo counties.

Prior to being elected to the Michigan House of Representatives, Maturen served on the Kalamazoo County Board of Commissioners for 12 years.

== Education ==
Maturen holds a bachelor's degree in Business Administration and a Master of Public Administration degree from Western Michigan University.

== Personal life and professional career ==
Maturen grew up in Essexville, Michigan. He has been married to his wife, Nancy, for 45 years, and they have three daughters and two granddaughters.

Maturen is a licensed real estate appraiser and real estate broker. Maturen is the owner of the Portage-based real estate appraisal firm Maturen & Associates, Inc. and previously served as the chair of the State Board of Real Estate Appraisers and as secretary to the board of trustees of the Appraisal Foundation.
