= Nottawaseppi Huron Band of Potawatomi =

Federally-recognized Potawatomi tribe in the United States

Nadwézibiniyek

Total population
- About 1500

Regions with significant populations
- Michigan

Languages
- English, formerly Potawatomi

Religion
- Christianity, traditional tribal religion

Related ethnic groups
- Other Potawatomi, Ojibwe, Odawa

The Nottawaseppi Huron Band of Potawatomi (NHBP) (Potawatomi: Nadwézibiniyek) is a federally-recognized tribe of Potawatomi in the United States. The tribe achieved federal recognition on December 19, 1995, and currently has approximately 1,500 members.

The Pine Creek Indian Reservation is located at 42°06′18″N 85°15′40″W in Athens Township in southwestern Calhoun County in southwestern Michigan. It has a land area of a little over 199 acres. It has purchased an additional 230 acres of land for its use and operates a gaming casino in Battle Creek.

== Name ==
Despite the name, this band of Potawatomi has no direct connection with the unrelated Huron people. Rather, both "Nottawaseppi" and "Huron" refer to the band's historical location along the Clinton River in southeastern Michigan. This river was formerly known as the Nottawasippee River or the Huron River of St. Clair. The root Nottawa in Nottawasippee is an Ojibwe ethnic slur meaning "like rattlesnakes", referring to the Huron people, who inhabited the area prior to the arrival of the Potawatomi, Odawa and Ojibwe.

== History ==
In the 19th century, especially, the Potawatomi people and closely related tribes of Odawa and Ojibwe peoples of the Anishinaabe were affiliated as the Council of Three Fires. All these peoples were highly decentralized and bands operated independently. During the 17th and 18th centuries, numerous bands moved into what is now Michigan.

The Nottawaseppi Huron Band of Potawatomi signed a treaty with the United States to cede much of its land in 1820, and was assigned a smaller portion of land as its reservation. It is located at 42°06′18″N 85°15′40″W in Athens Township in southwestern Calhoun County.

In the 20th century, the 1934 Indian Reorganization Act was intended to encourage tribes to set up self-government. The nine historic bands of Odawa, Ojibwe and Potawatomi in Michigan were not covered by this act and later had to achieve federal recognition or reaffirmation as tribes independently, a process that continues.

The band organized to regain self-government, gaining reaffirmation of its status as a tribe in 1995 by Congressional legislation. Their homeland headquarters are in Wakeshma Township, near Athens, in the southwestern region of Michigan's Lower Peninsula. This is about 17 miles southwest of Battle Creek (about 22 miles by vehicle route). Athens Township is within the major city's metropolitan area. The Band also maintains satellite offices in Grand Rapids, about 74 miles north of Fulton/Athens. The service area of the tribe includes the reservation as well as members living in Kalamazoo, Calhoun, Ottawa, Kent and Allegan counties.

== Government ==
The NHBP is governed by a written constitution and an elected 5-member tribal council. This includes the following executive officers: Chairperson, Vice-chairperson, Secretary, Treasurer and Sergeant-at-Arms.

=== Tribal Court ===
The NHBP Tribal Court was established in 2006. It is run by a Tribal Chief Justice.

=== Tribal departments ===
The NHBP administration is divided into departments for Administration, Bkedé O Mshiké, Communications, Culture, Finance, Environmental, Government Records, Human Resources, Information Technology, Legal, Membership Services, Planning, Public Works, Social Services and Tribal Historic Preservation Office.

== Economy ==
The NHBP own FireKeepers Casino, a 236,000-square-foot (21,900 m^{2}) casino with an attached 2,078-space parking garage on 78 acres (320,000 m^{2}) located in Battle Creek, Michigan. This operation is governed by a compact with the state of Michigan. The NHBP also owns Waséyabek Development Company, LLC, to foster economic self-sufficiency through non-gaming business acquisitions, developments and investments.

== Tribal timeline of events ==
- 1970 – The Tribe is incorporated in the state of Michigan. Government by a written constitution and an elected Tribal Council is established.
- 1995 – The United States government restores federal recognition to the tribe on December 19.
- 1998 – The Tribe purchases a 155-acre (630,000 m^{2}) property on Q Drive near Fulton, Michigan.
- 2000 – An administration building is constructed.
- 2003 – A multi-use trail system is constructed.
- 2004 – Road construction begins. On August 7, the Athens Arch is dedicated by the Athens Superintendent of Schools at Athens High School. The arch commemorates the history of the Huron Potawatomi and the cordial relations between the tribe and the town of Athens, Michigan.
- 2005 – The tribe constructs its first group of single family, energy-efficient homes on the Reservation.
- 2006 – A Tribal court is established.
- 2007 – A Community Center and Health Center are constructed. A 79-acre (320,000 m^{2}) parcel of property in Emmett Township is placed into Federal trust on behalf of the Tribe. The Tribe places 75 acres (300,000 m^{2}) of the Q Drive property into the USDA wetland reserve program.
- 2008 – Construction begins on FireKeepers Casino in Battle Creek, Michigan.
- 2009 – FireKeepers Casino opens on August 5, 2009.
- 2010 – Nottawaseppi Huron Band chairwoman Laura Spurr, who had served in that position since 2003 and helped to develop the FireKeepers Casino, dies on February 19, 2010.

== See also ==
- Anishinaabe
- Council of Three Fires
- Potawatomi
- Notawasepe Potawatamie Reservation, established by treaty of 1820 with the United States and home of many of the band's ancestors in the 1820s.
