= Sherwood, Michigan =

- Village
- Village of Sherwood
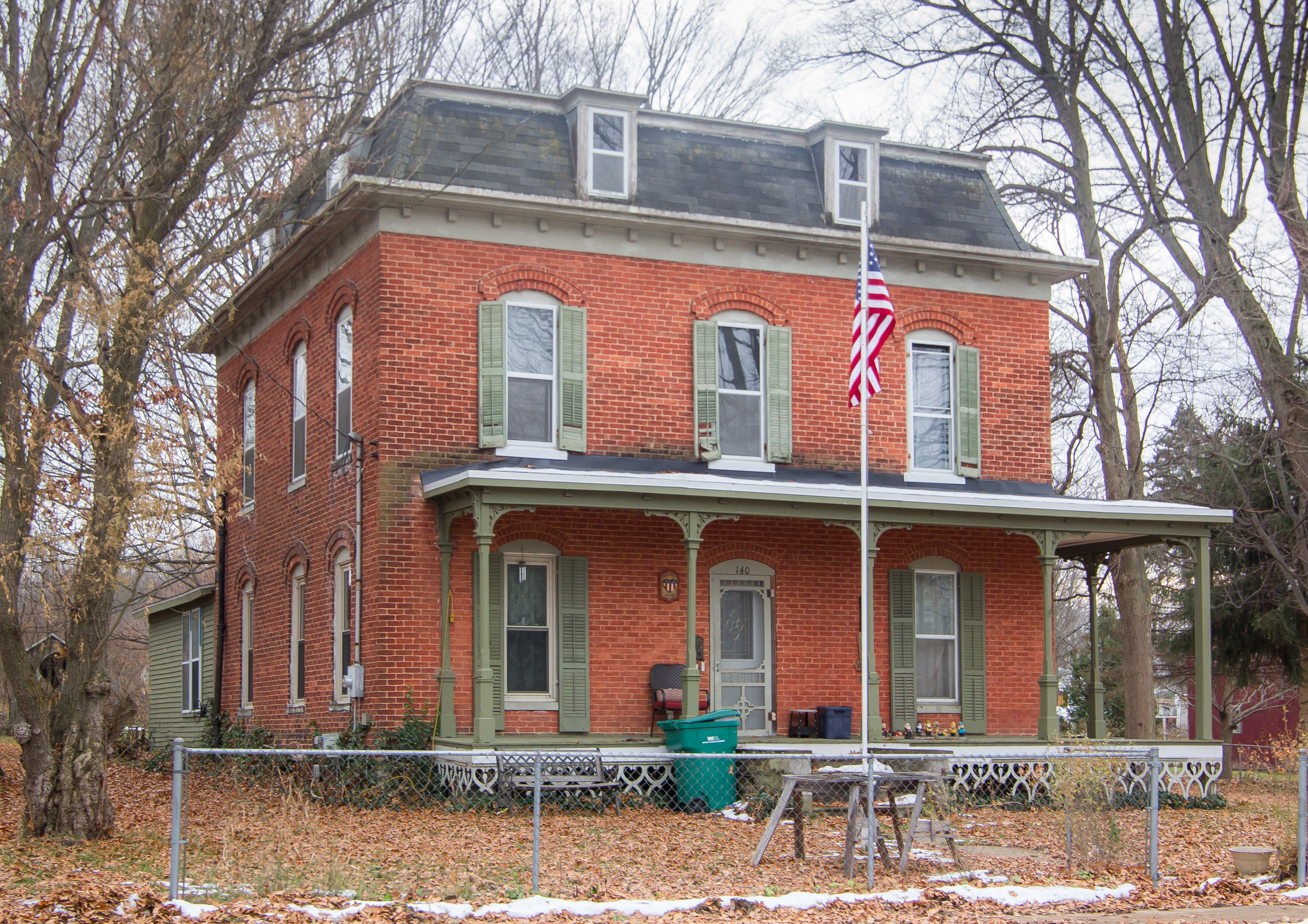
- Henry A. Locke House in Sherwood

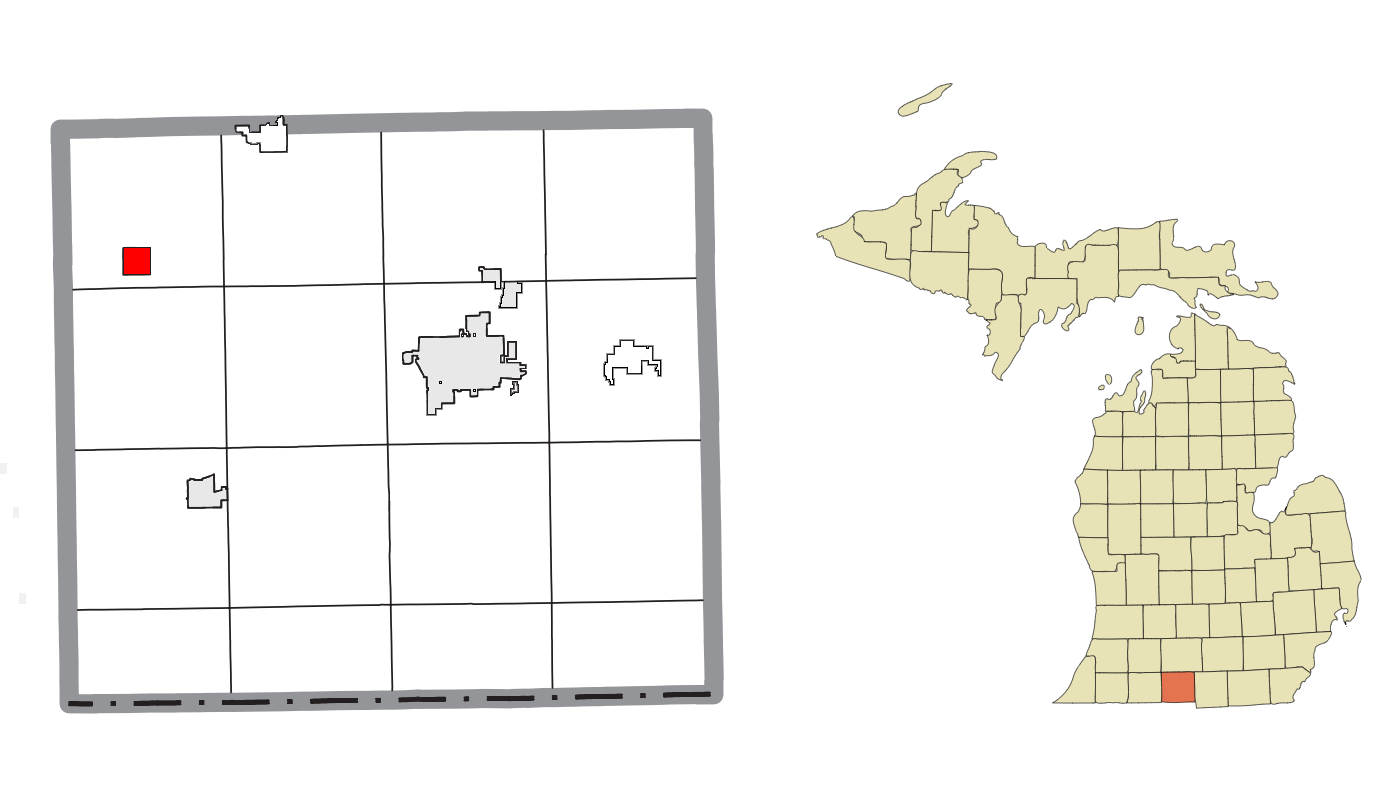
- Location within Branch County

- Location within the state of Michigan Location within the United States
- Coordinates: 42°0′2″N 85°14′24″W
- Country: United States
- State: Michigan
- County: Branch
- Township: Sherwood
- Settled: 1832
- Incorporated: 1887

Government
  - Type: Village council
  - President: Traci Counterman
  - Clerk: Linda Luce

Area
  - Total: 1.00 sq mi (2.59 km^{2})
  - Land: 1.00 sq mi (2.59 km^{2})
  - Water: 0 sq mi (0.00 km^{2})
- Elevation: 879 ft (268 m)

Population (2020)
  - Total: 285
  - Density: 285/sq mi (110/km^{2})
- Time zone: UTC-5 (Eastern (EST))
  - Summer (DST): UTC-4 (EDT)
- ZIP code(s): 49089
- Area code: 517
- FIPS code: 26-73420
- GNIS feature ID: 0637777

Sherwood is a village in Branch County of the U.S. state of Michigan. The population was 285 at the 2020 census. The village is located within Sherwood Township.

== History ==
The community was originally called Hazenville when it was formed from the farmland of E. F. Hazen in 1832. When a post office began operating on March 8, 1833, it was named Durham. It was ultimately renamed to Sherwood on June 10, 1839. It was named after one of the first settlers, Alexander Tomlinson, who came from Sherwood Forest, England. The Sherwood post office closed on December 4, 1866. The nearby Newstead post office, which was established in early 1867, was transferred here and took over the Sherwood name on April 16, 1868. The Michigan Central Railroad built a line through the community in 1871. Sherwood incorporated as a village in 1887.

On May 7 2024 a Tornado Emergency was issued for the area and a EF2 Tornado came through.

== Geography ==
According to the U.S. Census Bureau, the village has a total area of 1.00 square mile (2.59 km^{2}), all land.

The St. Joseph River flows just northwest of the village boundaries.

== Demographics ==
Historical population
| Census | Pop. | Note | %± |
|---|---|---|---|
| 1880 | 211 | | — |
| 1890 | 447 | | 111.8% |
| 1900 | 366 | | −18.1% |
| 1910 | 346 | | −5.5% |
| 1920 | 250 | | −27.7% |
| 1930 | 282 | | 12.8% |
| 1940 | 281 | | −0.4% |
| 1950 | 362 | | 28.8% |
| 1960 | 356 | | −1.7% |
| 1970 | 400 | | 12.4% |
| 1980 | 353 | | −11.7% |
| 1990 | 320 | | −9.3% |
| 2000 | 324 | | 1.3% |
| 2010 | 309 | | −4.6% |
| 2020 | 285 | | −7.8% |
U.S. Decennial Census

=== 2010 census ===
As of the census of 2010, there were 309 people, 106 households, and 77 families residing in the village. The population density was 315.3 inhabitants per square mile (121.7/km^{2}). There were 128 housing units at an average density of 130.6 per square mile (50.4/km^{2}). The racial makeup of the village was 95.1% White, 0.6% African American, 3.6% Native American, and 0.6% from two or more races. Hispanic or Latino of any race were 0.3% of the population.

There were 106 households, of which 40.6% had children under the age of 18 living with them, 50.0% were married couples living together, 12.3% had a female householder with no husband present, 10.4% had a male householder with no wife present, and 27.4% were non-families. 20.8% of all households were made up of individuals, and 10.4% had someone living alone who was 65 years of age or older. The average household size was 2.92 and the average family size was 3.32.

The median age in the village was 39.2 years. 23.9% of residents were under the age of 18; 11.7% were between the ages of 18 and 24; 26.6% were from 25 to 44; 26% were from 45 to 64; and 12% were 65 years of age or older. The gender makeup of the village was 50.5% male and 49.5% female.

=== 2000 census ===
As of the census of 2000, there were 324 people, 114 households, and 93 families residing in the village. The population density was 320.8 inhabitants per square mile (123.9/km^{2}). There were 126 housing units at an average density of 124.7 per square mile (48.1/km^{2}). The racial makeup of the village was 96.60% White, 0.62% African American, 0.93% Native American, and 1.85% from two or more races. Hispanic or Latino of any race were 0.62% of the population.

There were 114 households, out of which 41.2% had children under the age of 18 living with them, 57.9% were married couples living together, 15.8% had a female householder with no husband present, and 18.4% were non-families. 14.9% of all households were made up of individuals, and 8.8% had someone living alone who was 65 years of age or older. The average household size was 2.84 and the average family size was 3.04.

In the village, the population was spread out, with 30.9% under the age of 18, 9.9% from 18 to 24, 28.7% from 25 to 44, 22.2% from 45 to 64, and 8.3% who were 65 years of age or older. The median age was 31 years. For every 100 females, there were 109.0 males. For every 100 females age 18 and over, there were 103.6 males.

The median income for a household in the village was $39,844, and the median income for a family was $41,250. Males had a median income of $31,429 versus $25,893 for females. The per capita income for the village was $16,101. About 8.3% of families and 10.6% of the population were below the poverty line, including 16.5% of those under age 18 and 8.3% of those age 65 or over.
