= Matt Hall (politician) =

American politician

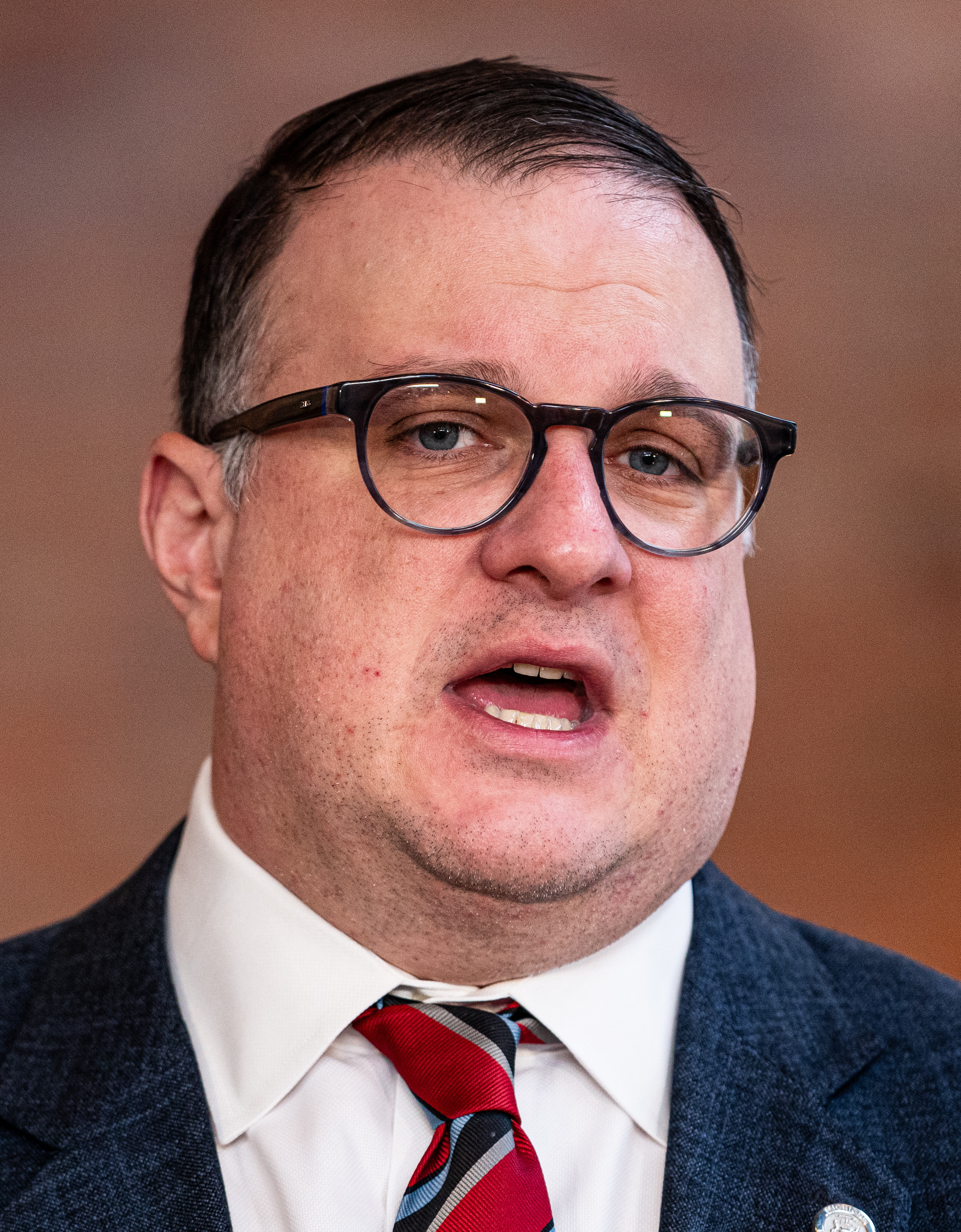

79th Speaker of the Michigan House of Representatives
- Incumbent
- Assumed office January 8, 2025
- Preceded by: Joe Tate

Minority Leader of the Michigan House of Representatives
- In office January 11, 2023 – January 8, 2025
- Preceded by: Donna Lasinski
- Succeeded by: Ranjeev Puri

Member of the Michigan House of Representatives
- Incumbent
- Assumed office January 1, 2019
- Preceded by: David Maturen
- Constituency: 63rd district (2019–2023); 42nd district (2023–present)

Personal details
- Party: Republican
- Education: Western Michigan University (BA, JD)

Matthew Hall is an American lawyer and politician serving as the 79th speaker of the Michigan House of Representatives since January 2025. A member of the Republican Party, Hall has served in the Michigan House of Representatives since 2019 (currently representing the 42nd district), and served as the House Minority Leader from 2023 to 2025.

== Education ==
In 2006, Hall earned a bachelor's degree in Business Management and Public Administration from Western Michigan University Haworth College of Business. In 2017, he earned a Juris Doctor degree from Western Michigan University Cooley Law School.

== Political career ==
In 2005, Hall began his career as a legislative intern at the Michigan House of Representatives. Hall was an External Affairs Representative for the Michigan Department of State, and he was the Field Director of Terri Lynn Land for Michigan Secretary of State.

In 2007, Hall became a Business Development Representative for L-3 Combat Propulsion Systems. From 2007 to 2009, he served as a vice-chair for the Michigan Republican Party.

In 2011, he became the West Michigan Liaison for Michigan's Office of the Attorney General. He became an attorney when he was admitted to the bar in November 2017.

=== Michigan House of Representatives ===
On November 6, 2018, Hall was elected to the Michigan House of Representatives from District 63 with 56.6% of the vote. In his first term, Hall chaired the Oversight Committee. In 2020, he was also appointed chair of the Joint Select Committee on the COVID-19 pandemic.

Hall was reelected in 2020 with 60.6% of the vote. Following the election, House Republicans selected him to serve as caucus chair. During his second term, Hall chaired the Tax Policy Committee.

In 2022, Hall was elected to a third term with 55% of the vote, now representing District 42 following redistricting. House Republicans elected Hall minority leader for the new term. Hall was reelected to the state House in 2024.

=== Speaker of the Michigan House of Representatives ===
In February 2026, Hall praised President Donald Trump for threatening to block the opening of the Gordie Howe International Bridge between Windsor, Ontario and Detroit, Michigan. Hall noted that there was another bridge connecting Canada and Michigan, the Ambassador Bridge, "owned by an American" and that a lot of people were happy with just one bridge." The Ambassador Bridge is owned and monetized by the Moroun family, major Republican Party donors who have for years sought to prevent the construction of another bridge.

== Personal life ==
Hall currently lives in Richland Township, Michigan.

== See also ==
- Michigan House of Representatives
- 2018 Michigan House of Representatives election
- 2020 Michigan House of Representatives election
- 2022 Michigan House of Representatives election

Michigan House of Representatives
Preceded by David Maturen	Member of the Michigan House of Representatives from the 63rd district 2019–2023	Succeeded by Jay DeBoyer
Preceded by Ann Bollin	Member of the Michigan House of Representatives from the 42nd district 2023–present	Incumbent
Preceded by Donna Lasinski	Minority Leader of the Michigan House of Representatives; 2023–2025	Succeeded by Ranjeev Puri
Political offices
Preceded by Joe Tate	Speaker of the Michigan House of Representatives; 2025–present	Incumbent
