= Wakeshma Township, Michigan =

- Civil township
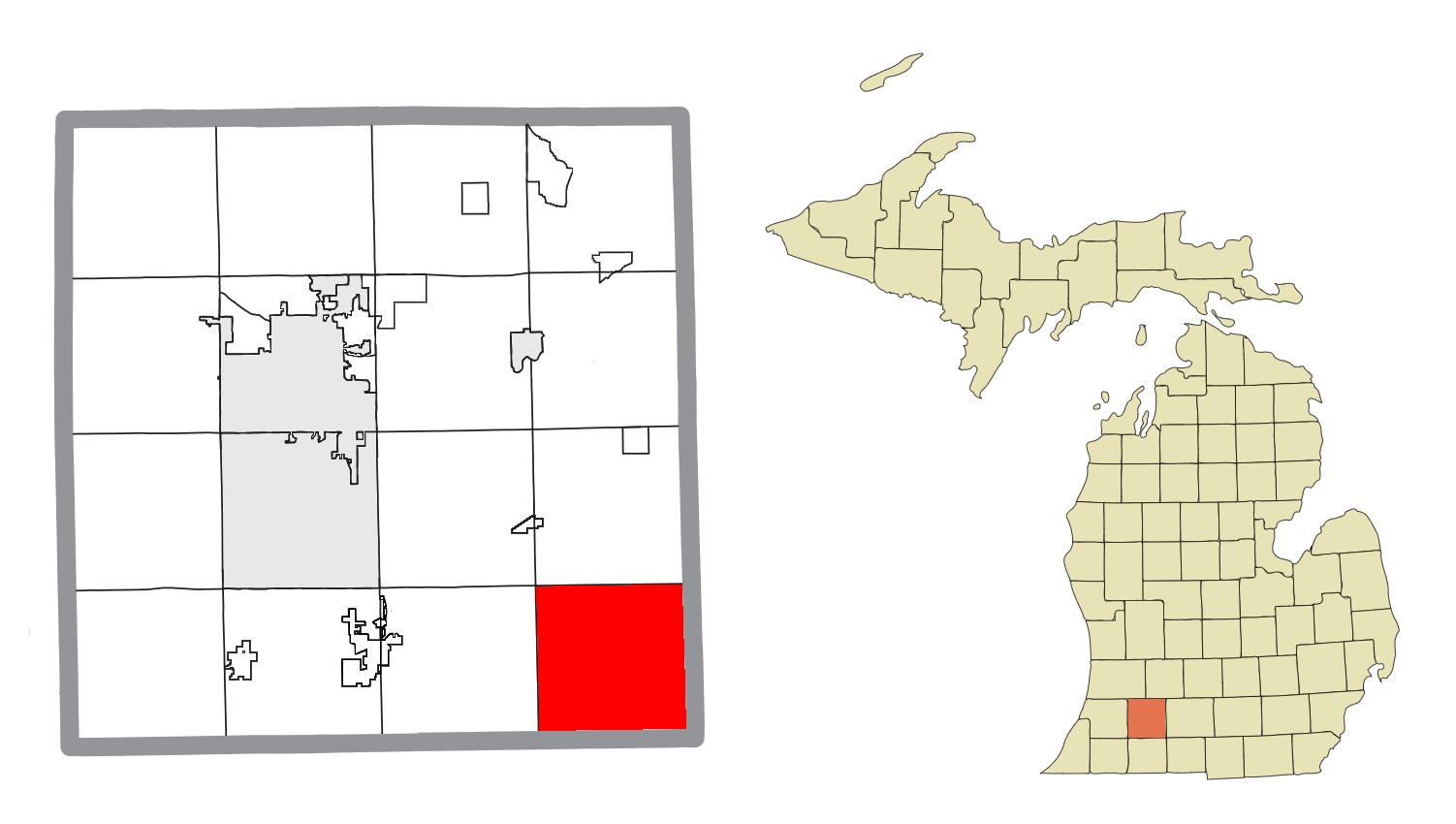
- Location within Kalamazoo County

- Location within the state of Michigan Location within the United States
- Coordinates: 42°6′56″N 85°21′13″W
- Country: United States
- State: Michigan
- County: Kalamazoo

Area
  - Total: 36.0 sq mi (93.3 km^{2})
  - Land: 36.0 sq mi (93.3 km^{2})
  - Water: 0 sq mi (0.0 km^{2})
- Elevation: 906 ft (276 m)

Population (2020)
  - Total: 1,341
  - Density: 37.2/sq mi (14.4/km^{2})
- Time zone: UTC-5 (Eastern (EST))
  - Summer (DST): UTC-4 (EDT)
- FIPS code: 26-077-82840
- GNIS feature ID: 1627206
- Website: wakeshmatownship.com

Wakeshma Township is a civil township of Kalamazoo County in the U.S. state of Michigan. The 2020 census recorded a population of 1,341, up from 1,301 at the 2010 census.

== Communities ==
- Fulton is an unincorporated community near the center of the township at 42°06′54″N 85°21′09″W. It is the only population center in the township.
- The Fulton area ZIP code is 49052 and serves the eastern and southern portions of the township as well as a portion of southeast Climax Township and western Athens Township in Calhoun County.
- Fulton is the site of the federally recognized Nottawaseppi Huron Band of Potawatomi's headquarters. The Band has a reservation near here and jurisdiction over tribal members in neighboring counties. It owns and operates a gaming casino in Battle Creek, Michigan, approximately 25 miles (40 km) northeast of Fulton.

== Geography ==
According to the United States Census Bureau, the township has a total area of 36.0 square miles (93.3 km^{2}), all land. Little Portage Creek and Bear Creek flow through the township.

Adjacent townships in Kalamazoo County are: Brady (west), Pavilion (northwest) and Climax (north). In Calhoun County: Leroy (northeast) and Athens (east). In Branch County: Sherwood (southeast). In St. Joseph County: Leonidas (south) and Mendon (southwest).

== Demographics ==
As of the census of 2000, there were 1,414 people, 486 households, and 402 families residing in the township. The population density was 39.3 inhabitants per square mile (15.2/km^{2}). There were 502 housing units at an average density of 13.9 per square mile (5.4/km^{2}). The racial makeup of the township was 97.60% White, 0.50% African American, 0.07% Native American, 0.35% Asian, 0.64% from other races, and 0.85% from two or more races. Hispanic or Latino of any race were 0.64% of the population.

There were 486 households, out of which 40.7% had children under the age of 18 living with them, 69.8% were married couples living together, 7.8% had a female householder with no husband present, and 17.1% were non-families. 13.6% of all households were made up of individuals, and 4.5% had someone living alone who was 65 years of age or older. The average household size was 2.88 and the average family size was 3.14.

In the township the population was spread out, with 28.8% under the age of 18, 6.6% from 18 to 24, 30.6% from 25 to 44, 23.8% from 45 to 64, and 10.3% who were 65 years of age or older. The median age was 36 years. For every 100 females, there were 107.0 males. For every 100 females age 18 and over, there were 108.1 males.

The median income for a household in the township was $52,328, and the median income for a family was $53,264. Males had a median income of $36,739 versus $27,292 for females. The per capita income for the township was $20,051. About 7.3% of families and 8.7% of the population were below the poverty line, including 13.2% of those under age 18 and 8.3% of those age 65 or over.
