= Notawasepe Potawatamie Reservation =

The Notawasepe Potawatamie Reservation was the home of the principal ancestors of the Nottawaseppi Huron Band of Potawatomi starting in 1821, under a treaty made with the United States government. The reservation, which was first established in 1821 and significantly expanded in 1827, was disbanded in 1833.

== History ==
The Notawasepe Potawatamie Reservation was established under the 1821 Treaty of Chicago, which reserved a four-square-mile tract of land along the St. Joseph River for a band of Potawatomi later known as the Nottawaseppi Huron Band of Potawatomi. The reservation was enlarged by the 1827 Treaty of St. Joseph, which expanded it to ninety-nine sections of land. In the 1833 Treaty of Chicago, the Potawatomi ceded the reservation and other lands in Michigan to the United States as part of the federal Indian removal policy. Although the reservation was formally ceded in 1833, many Potawatomi continued to reside in the area for several years before removal west of the Mississippi River.
