= East Leroy, Michigan =

- Unincorporated community
- Location within Michigan
- Coordinates: 42°09′58″N 85°13′03″W
- Country: United States
- State: Michigan
- County: Calhoun
- Elevation: 915 ft (279 m)
- Time zone: UTC-5 (Eastern (EST))
  - Summer (DST): UTC-4 (EDT)
- ZIP code: 49051
- Area code: 269
- GNIS feature ID: 625226

East Leroy is an unincorporated community in Calhoun County, Michigan, United States. East Leroy is 11 miles (18 km) south-southwest of Battle Creek. East Leroy has a post office with ZIP code 49051.

== History ==
David C. Fish became the first resident of East Leroy in 1836, though Ira Case had bought land in the area the previous year. Fish's wife named the community Leroy after the couple's first son, Leroy Fish. A marsh in the area split the community into East and West Leroy. The post office opened on June 28, 1852, under the name Secillia; William H. Gilles was its first postmaster. The post office closed in 1871 but reopened in 1872, and it was renamed East Leroy in 1874.
