= Michigan Civil Service Commission =

Organization

Agency overview
- Formed: 1908
- Headquarters: Lansing, Michigan
- Minister responsible: Thomas M Wardrop, Commission Chair
- Agency executives: Jan Winters, State Personnel Director; Matthew Fedorchuk, Deputy Director
- Parent agency: Department of Management and Budget
- Website: www.michigan.gov/mdcs/

State Personnel Director of State of Michigan
- Incumbent; Jan Winters
- Appointer: Michigan Civil Service Commission
- Formation: 1965
- Website: www.michigan.gov/mdcs/

The Michigan Civil Service Commission is a four-member constitutionally created commission to administer Michigan's classified state civil service and human resource functions.

== History ==
Initially created in Michigan's 1908 Constitution, the commission continued into the next ratified Constitution of 1963. In the Executive Organization Act of 1965, the Department of Civil Service with the commission as its head with its chief administrative officer being the State Personnel Director. Under EXECUTIVE ORDER No.2007 - 30, the Department of Civil Service was abolished with the Board of Ethics, State Officers Compensation Commission and Civil Service Commission transfer to Department of Management and Budget.
