= Climax, Michigan =

- Village
- Village of Climax
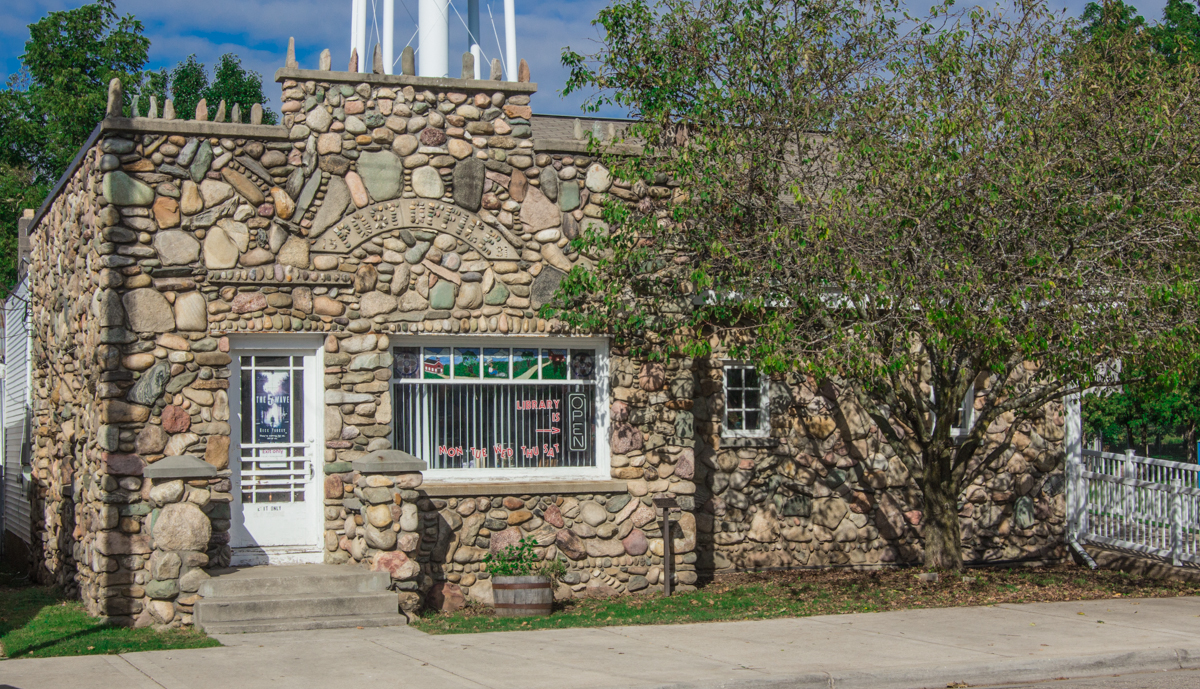
- Old Climax Post Office

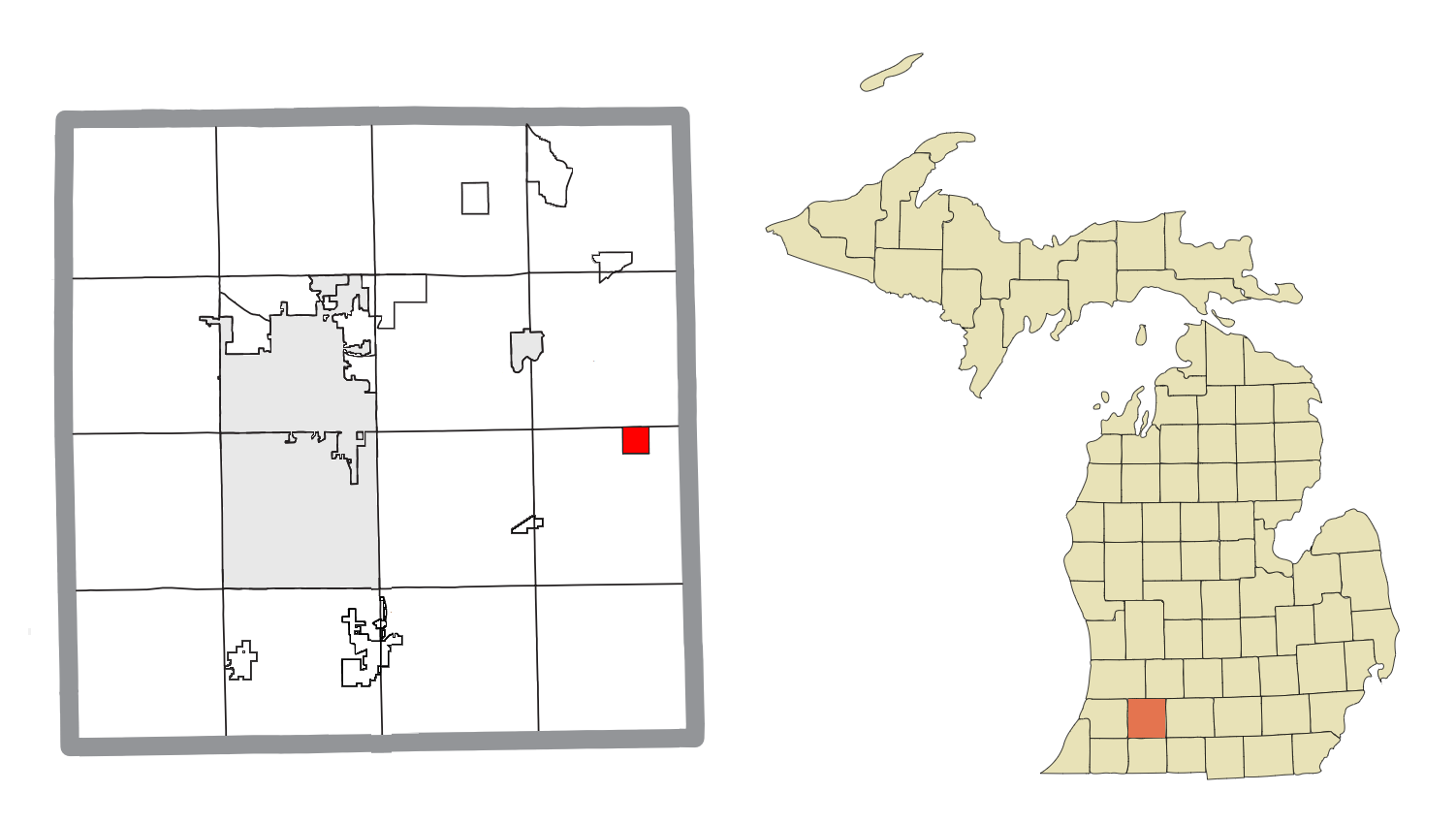
- Location within Kalamazoo County

- Location within the state of Michigan Location within the United States
- Coordinates: 42°14′15″N 85°20′13″W
- Country: United States
- State: Michigan
- County: Kalamazoo
- Township: Climax

Area
  - Total: 1.05 sq mi (2.73 km^{2})
  - Land: 1.05 sq mi (2.73 km^{2})
  - Water: 0 sq mi (0.00 km^{2})
- Elevation: 965 ft (294 m)

Population (2020)
  - Total: 712
  - Density: 674.8/sq mi (260.54/km^{2})
- Time zone: UTC-5 (Eastern (EST))
  - Summer (DST): UTC-4 (EDT)
- ZIP code: 49034
- Area code: 269
- FIPS code: 26-16440
- GNIS feature ID: 0623472

Climax is a village in Kalamazoo County in the U.S. state of Michigan. As of the 2020 census, Climax had a population of 712. The village is located within Climax Township on the northern boundary with Charleston Township, and is roughly 12 miles (19 km) west of Battle Creek and 16 miles (26 km) east of Kalamazoo. Climax shares a school district with the neighboring town of Scotts.

== History ==
In 1825, John Mullet was among the first white settlers in Climax, along with Calvin White (1831), and the Farnsworth brothers (1832) More Euro-American settlement of this area began in 1838. It was incorporated as a village in 1899.

Climax got its name in 1834, when the family of Judge Caleb Eldred found a prairie after months of searching for good farmland. His son, Daniel B. Eldred, climbed a tree to look around and said, "This caps the climax of everything we saw."

On December 3, 1896, Climax and the surrounding area was the first community to receive free rural mail service from the U.S. Post Office in the state of Michigan.

== Geography ==
According to the United States Census Bureau, the village has a total area of 1.06 square miles (2.75 km^{2}), all land.

== Demographics ==
Historical population
Census	Pop.	Note	%±
1880	268		—
1890	369		37.7%
1900	398		7.9%
1910	425		6.8%
1920	395		−7.1%
1930	441		11.6%
1940	460		4.3%
1950	524		13.9%
1960	587		12.0%
1970	594		1.2%
1980	619		4.2%
1990	677		9.4%
2000	791		16.8%
2010	767		−3.0%
2020	712		−7.2%
U.S. Decennial Census

=== 2010 census ===
As of the census of 2010, there were 767 people, 280 households, and 213 families living in the village. The population density was 723.6 inhabitants per square mile (279.4/km^{2}). There were 303 housing units at an average density of 285.8 per square mile (110.3/km^{2}). The racial makeup of the village was 98.3% White, 0.5% African American, 0.1% Asian, 0.3% from other races, and 0.8% from two or more races. Hispanic or Latino of any race were 2.0% of the population.

There were 280 households, of which 37.5% had children under the age of 18 living with them, 56.8% were married couples living together, 11.8% had a female householder with no husband present, 7.5% had a male householder with no wife present, and 23.9% were non-families. 18.9% of all households were made up of individuals, and 6.5% had someone living alone who was 65 years of age or older. The average household size was 2.74 and the average family size was 3.11.

The median age in the village was 37.9 years. 26.5% of residents were under the age of 18; 8.7% were between the ages of 18 and 24; 25.1% were from 25 to 44; 30.3% were from 45 to 64; and 9.4% were 65 years of age or older. The gender makeup of the village was 50.3% male and 49.7% female.

=== 2000 census ===
As of the census of 2000, there were 791 people, 279 households, and 212 families living in the village. The population density was 769.9 inhabitants per square mile (297.3/km^{2}). There were 291 housing units at an average density of 283.2 per square mile (109.3/km^{2}). The racial makeup of the village was 96.08% White, 0.88% African American, 0.63% Native American, 1.14% from other races, and 1.26% from two or more races. Hispanic or Latino of any race were 3.16% of the population.

There were 279 households, out of which 41.6% had children under the age of 18 living with them, 63.4% were married couples living together, 7.9% had a female householder with no husband present, and 24.0% were non-families. 19.0% of all households were made up of individuals, and 7.2% had someone living alone who was 65 years of age or older. The average household size was 2.84 and the average family size was 3.28.

In the village, the population was spread out, with 31.9% under the age of 18, 8.7% from 18 to 24, 30.7% from 25 to 44, 21.1% from 45 to 64, and 7.6% who were 65 years of age or older. The median age was 32 years. For every 100 females, there were 91.1 males. For every 100 females age 18 and over, there were 96.7 males.

The median income for a household in the village was $44,464, and the median income for a family was $50,625. Males had a median income of $35,833 versus $27,604 for females. The per capita income for the village was $18,658. About 2.8% of families and 4.7% of the population were below the poverty line, including 5.5% of those under age 18 and none of those age 65 or over.
