= FireKeepers Casino Hotel =

Casino and hotel

Coordinates: 42.29701°N 85.07493°W

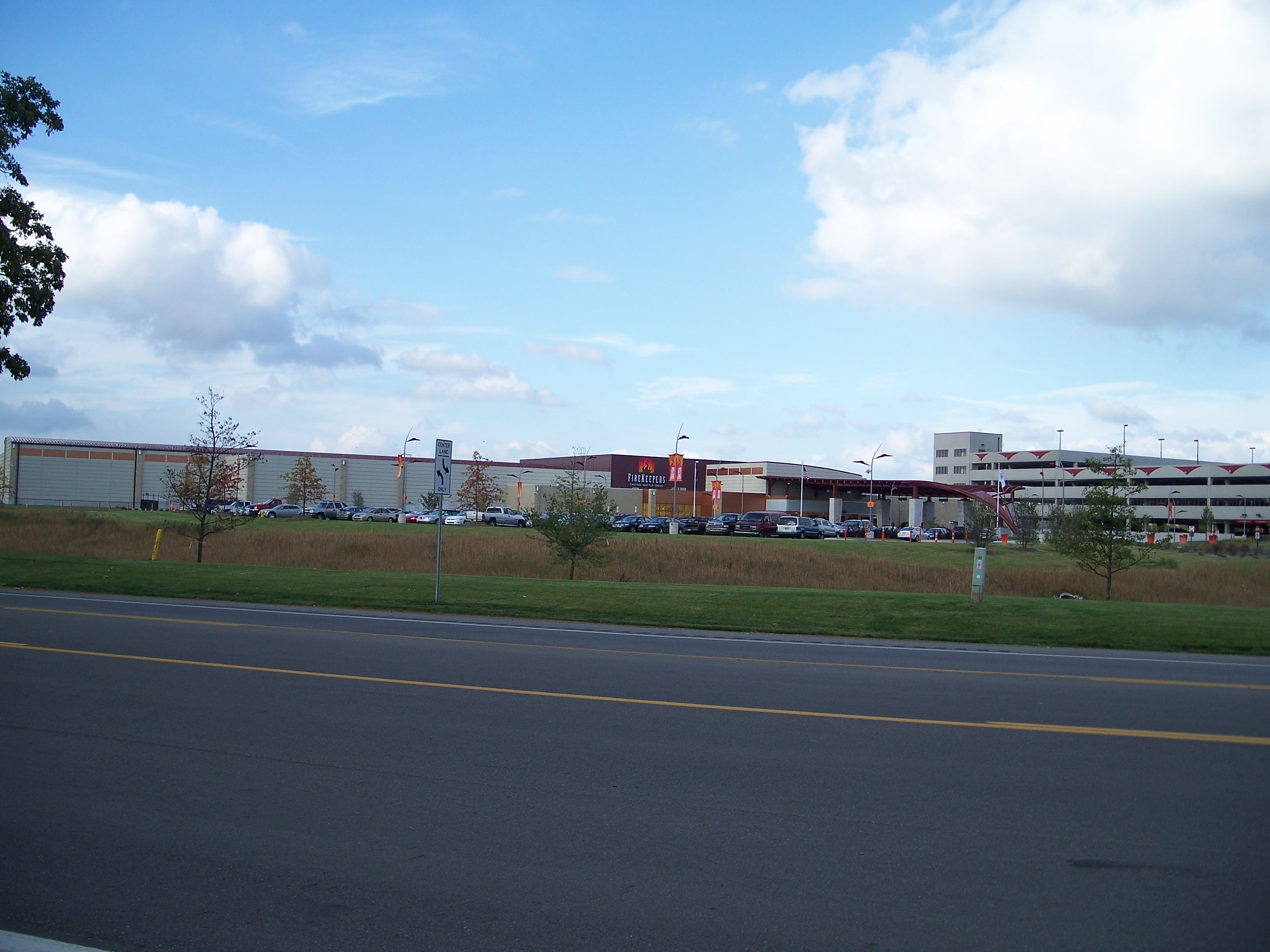
- Interactive map of FireKeepers Casino Hotel
- Location: Battle Creek, Michigan; 11177 East Michigan Ave
- Opened: August 5, 2009
- Gaming space: 107,000 square feet (9,900 m^{2})
- Casino type: Land-based
- Owner: Nottawaseppi Huron Band of Potawatomi
- Renovated in: 2021 (hotel addition)

FireKeepers Casino Hotel is a 236,000-square-foot (21,900 m^{2}) casino and hotel in Emmett Charter Township, Michigan, between Battle Creek and Marshall. It is owned and operated by the Nottawaseppi Huron Band of Potawatomi. Construction began May 7, 2008, and the casino opened to the general public on August 5, 2009. Construction was a joint venture between Shingobee Builders and Clark Construction. The hotel and other additions opened in December 2012.

== Description ==
The casino has 2,900 state-of-the-art slot machines, and 76 table games, including blackjack, roulette, craps, Big Six and baccarat. It has six restaurants, a sports bar and cabaret. The gaming floor occupies 107,000 square feet (9,900 m^{2}), and there are 3,000 parking spaces, 2,080 of them in a covered garage. Interest in employment with FireKeepers remained high, with nearly 16,000 applications received in 2010.

FireKeepers was developed by Gaming Entertainment Michigan (GEM), a joint venture of gaming operator Full House Resorts and real estate developer Robert Mathewson. From its opening, GEM signed an agreement to manage the casino through August 2016, receiving 26 percent of net income. The Nottawaseppi Huron Band bought out the agreement four years early for $97.5 million, and took over management in May 2012.

The casino advertises via a huge electronic sign on the I-94 freeway, the heavily traveled corridor between Detroit and Chicago. The sign is 50 ft (15 m) tall by 30 ft (9.1 m) wide by 8 ft (2.4 m) deep, and the total structure weighs more than 10 short tons (9,100 kg). The electronic display unit on the sign is 15 ft (4.6 m) tall by 22 ft (6.7 m) wide. It is double sided (there is one unit on each side of the sign), and each side has 43,000 full-color pixels. The sign can display 281 trillion colors, significantly more than the human eye can distinguish. Content is sent via wireless broad band communication from the casino marketing office. The sign uses energy-saving LED technology, and the cost of its energy consumption will be about $17.59 per day. More than 47,000 vehicles travel pass the FireKeepers Casino location daily, and the sign is expected to be seen by more than 66,000 persons each day.

The tribe expanded the complex in 2012, completing construction and opening an eight-story, 243-room hotel in December of that year. The expansion included: a new grand lobby featuring a symbolic light totem, porte cochere, an event center, new restaurant, and smoke-free gaming area.

The tribe opened the Pit Stop gas station on the property in November of 2016, featuring sixteen fuel pumps, car wash, convenience store and five RV parking spots with electric hook-up.

The tribe announced that FireKeepers Casino would sponsor the June 2016 NASCAR Sprint Cup race at Michigan International Speedway, now called the FireKeepers Casino 400.
