= Fredonia Township, Michigan =

- Township
- Location within the state of Michigan
- Coordinates: 42°11′39″N 85°0′5″W
- Country: United States
- State: Michigan
- County: Calhoun

Area
  - Total: 34.8 sq mi (90.2 km^{2})
  - Land: 34.0 sq mi (88.1 km^{2})
  - Water: 0.81 sq mi (2.1 km^{2})
- Elevation: 938 ft (286 m)

Population (2020)
  - Total: 1,585
  - Density: 46.6/sq mi (18.0/km^{2})
- Time zone: UTC-5 (Eastern (EST))
  - Summer (DST): UTC-4 (EDT)
- FIPS code: 26-30500
- GNIS feature ID: 1626312
- Website: www.fredoniatownship.com

Fredonia Township is a civil township of Calhoun County in the U.S. state of Michigan located southwest of the city of Marshall. It is part of the Battle Creek Metropolitan Statistical Area. The population was 1,585 at the 2020 census.

== History ==
Fredonia Township was organized in 1838. The first town meeting was held at the home of Ebby Hyde on April 2, 1838. The name "Fredonia" had been coined by Samuel Latham Mitchill about 1803. He had proposed it as a replacement name for the United States, coupling the English word "freedom" with a Latin ending, meaning "place of freedom". Instead the word became a popular name for many new towns and cities.

== Communities ==
- Ellis Corner is a named place located at the intersection or H Drive South and 13 Mile Road. This was also the location of a post office in this township from 1882 until 1901. The Fredonia Township Fire Station #2 is located in Ellis Corners.
- Marshall city limit extends into the northeast corner of the township.
- Wrights Corner is a named place located at the intersection of F Drive South (M227) and 17 Mile Road (Old 27) and the location of the township hall and fire station #1.

== Geography ==
According to the United States Census Bureau, the township has a total area of 34.8 square miles (90.2 km^{2}), of which 34.0 square miles (88.1 km^{2}) is land and 0.81 square miles (2.1 km^{2}), or 2.38%, is water.

== Demographics ==
Historical population
Census	Pop.	Note	%±
1960	1,206		—
1970	1,442		19.6%
1980	1,755		21.7%
1990	1,741		−0.8%
2000	1,723		−1.0%
2010	1,626		−5.6%
2020	1,585		−2.5%
Source: Census Bureau. Census 1960- 2000, 2010.

As of the census of 2010 there were 1,626 people, 679 households, and 503 families residing in the township. The population density was 50.4 inhabitants per square mile (19.5/km^{2}) and housing density was 21.3 per square mile (8.2/km^{2}).

Of the 679 households, 29.0% had children under the age of 18 living with them, 61.9% were married couples living together, 8.5% had a female householder with no husband present, and 25.9% were non-families. 22.1% of all households were made up of individuals, and 8.1% had someone living alone who was 65 years of age or older. The average household size was 2.53 and the average family size was 2.91.

The township population age distribution was 23.3% under the age of 18, 7.6% from 18 to 24, 27.2% from 25 to 44, 27.9% from 45 to 64, and 13.9% who were 65 years of age or older. The median age was 41 years. For every 100 females, there were 96.0 males. For every 100 females age 18 and over, there were 97.2 males.

The median income for a household in the township was $46,635, and the median income for a family was $50,909. Males had a median income of $35,388 versus $28,875 for females. The per capita income for the township was $21,354. About 5.6% of families and 7.8% of the population were below the poverty line, including 13.3% of those under age 18 and 6.0% of those age 65 or over.
