= Sherwood Township, Michigan =

- Civil township
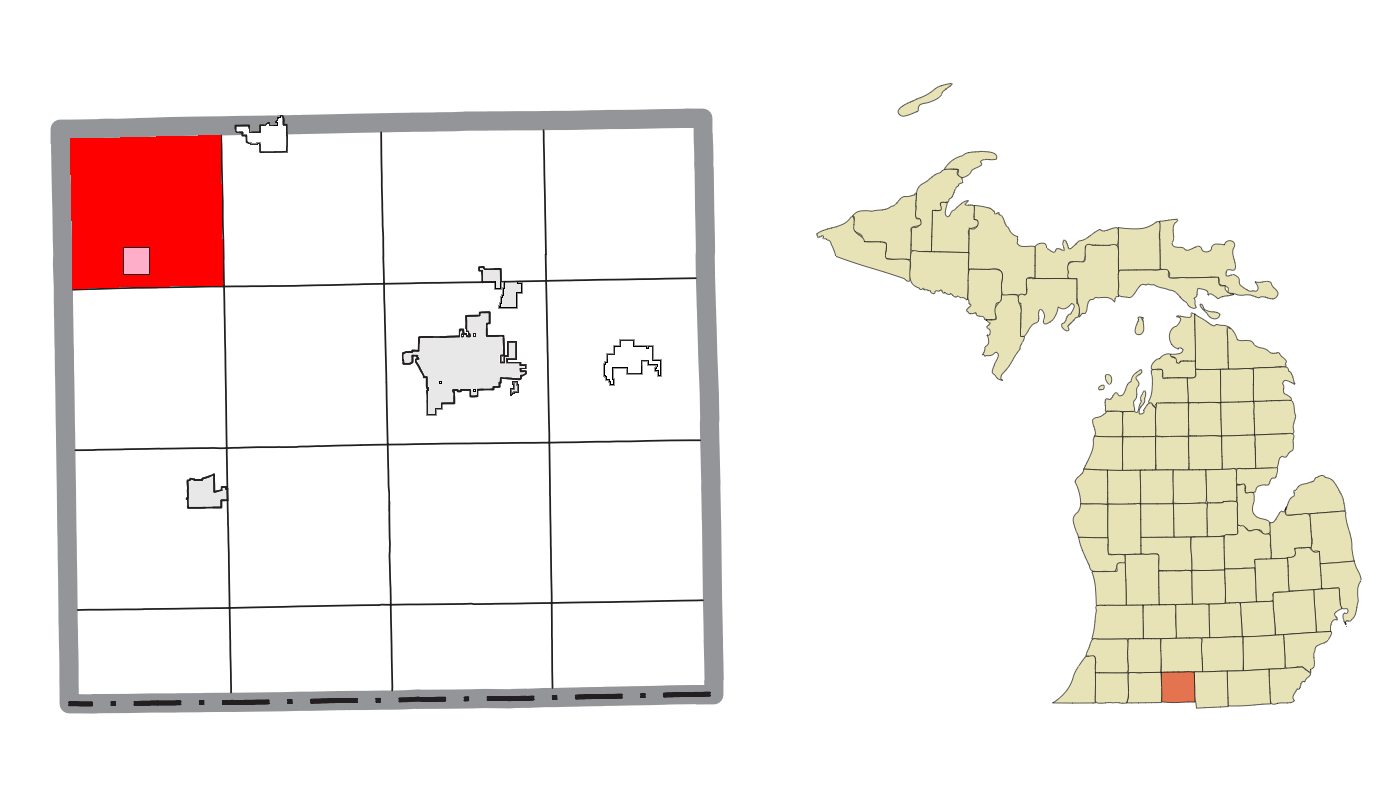
- Location within Branch County (red) and the administered village of Sherwood (pink)

- Location within the state of Michigan Location within the United States
- Coordinates: 42°01′34″N 85°13′57″W
- Country: United States
- State: Michigan
- County: Branch

Area
  - Total: 36.1 sq mi (93.6 km^{2})
  - Land: 34.6 sq mi (89.7 km^{2})
  - Water: 1.5 sq mi (3.9 km^{2})
- Elevation: 869 ft (265 m)

Population (2020)
  - Total: 1,959
  - Density: 56.6/sq mi (21.8/km^{2})
- Time zone: UTC-5 (Eastern (EST))
  - Summer (DST): UTC-4 (EDT)
- ZIP code: 49089
- Area code: 517
- FIPS code: 26-73440
- GNIS feature ID: 1627079
- Website: https://sherwoodtwpmi.gov/

Sherwood Township is a civil township of Branch County in the U.S. state of Michigan. The population was 1,959 at the 2020 census.

The village of Sherwood is located within the township. There are no other incorporated municipalities and no named settlements or unincorporated communities within the township.

== Geography ==
M-60/M-66 passes through the northwest corner of the township. M-66 separates from M-60 and goes due north while M-60 continues east.

The St. Joseph River flows diagonally from northeast to southwest through the township. The township is drained by several small streams and lakes that flow into the St. Joseph. Nottawa Creek passes through the northwest corner of the township, before joining the St. Joseph further downstream in Leonidas Township in St. Joseph County.

According to the United States Census Bureau, Sherwood Township has a total area of 36.1 square miles (93.6 km^{2}), of which 34.6 square miles (89.7 km^{2}) is land and 1.5 square miles (3.9 km^{2}), or 4.16%, is water.

== Demographics ==
Historical population
| Census | Pop. | Note | %± |
|---|---|---|---|
| 2000 | 2,284 | | — |
| 2010 | 2,094 | | −8.3% |
| 2020 | 1,959 | | −6.4% |

As of the census of 2000, there were 2,284 people, 885 households, and 658 families residing in the township. The population density was 65.5 inhabitants per square mile (25.3/km^{2}). There were 1,112 housing units at an average density of 31.9 per square mile (12.3/km^{2}). The racial makeup of the township was 97.02% White, 0.22% African American, 0.92% Native American, 0.13% Asian, 0.04% Pacific Islander, 0.04% from other races, and 1.62% from two or more races. Hispanic or Latino of any race were 0.96% of the population.

There were 885 households, out of which 31.6% had children under the age of 18 living with them, 56.6% were married couples living together, 10.8% had a female householder with no husband present, and 25.6% were non-families. 20.0% of all households were made up of individuals, and 7.8% had someone living alone who was 65 years of age or older. The average household size was 2.58 and the average family size was 2.94.

In the township the population was spread out, with 25.5% under the age of 18, 7.6% from 18 to 24, 29.0% from 25 to 44, 24.7% from 45 to 64, and 13.2% who were 65 years of age or older. The median age was 37 years. For every 100 females, there were 108.0 males. For every 100 females age 18 and over, there were 106.8 males.

The median income for a household in the township was $34,231, and the median income for a family was $38,203. Males had a median income of $30,485 versus $21,536 for females. The per capita income for the township was $15,560. About 8.8% of families and 11.4% of the population were below the poverty line, including 16.4% of those under age 18 and 10.9% of those age 65 or over.
