= Athens Township, Michigan =

- Township
- Location within the state of Michigan
- Coordinates: 42°6′27″N 85°14′1″W
- Country: United States
- State: Michigan
- County: Calhoun

Area
  - Total: 36.1 sq mi (93.6 km^{2})
  - Land: 35.9 sq mi (93.1 km^{2})
  - Water: 0.19 sq mi (0.5 km^{2})
- Elevation: 873 ft (266 m)

Population (2020)
  - Total: 2,444
  - Density: 71/sq mi (27.4/km^{2})
- Time zone: UTC-5 (Eastern (EST))
  - Summer (DST): UTC-4 (EDT)
- ZIP code: 49011
- Area code: 269
- FIPS code: 26-03900
- GNIS feature ID: 1625856
- Website: https://www.athenstwp.org/

Athens Township is a civil township of southwest Calhoun County in the U.S. state of Michigan, about 15 miles (24 km) south of Battle Creek. It is part of the Battle Creek, Michigan Metropolitan Statistical Area. As of the 2020 census, the township population was 2,444. The Nottawaseppi Huron Band of Potawatomi is based in Athens Township.

== History ==
Euro-American settlers first came to what would become Athens Township in 1831. Unlike in many other parts of Michigan the Potawatomi people were never fully driven out, although their reservation was dissolved in 1833. The first Athens Township Meeting was held in 1835. As of 1913 there were about 60 Potawatomi residents of Athens Township, out of about 1,500 residents total. Based on the 1910 US census for Athens township and village there were 1,537 residents, of whom five were listed as mulattoes (four of them children of a mulatto mother and white father) and 69 were listed as Indians. Of the 69 Indians, 40 were living in the Indian Village Reservation that at that time existed in Athens Township. At least two of the Indians were Ottawa and not Potawatomi.

== Communities ==
- Athens is a village located at 42°05′12″N 85°14′08″W within the southern portion of the township.
- Cecelia was a part of the township that had its own post office from 1860 until 1875.
- Huron Potawatomi Indian Reservation is an Indian reservation located within the southwest portion of the township. The Huron Potawatomi Indian Reservation is the land base of the federally recognized Nottawaseppi Huron Band of Potawatomi.

== Geography ==
According to the United States Census Bureau, the township has a total area of 36.1 square miles (93.6 km^{2}), of which 35.9 square miles (93.1 km^{2}) is land and 0.19 square miles (0.5 km^{2}), or 0.53%, is water. Nottawa Creek and Pine Creek are the largest streams in the township, both flowing generally from northeast to southwest towards the St. Joseph River. Pine Creek joins Nottowa Creek approximately one mile west of the village of Athens.

== Demographics ==
Historical population
Census	Pop.	Note	%±
1960	1,975		—
1970	2,136		8.2%
1980	2,294		7.4%
1990	2,515		9.6%
2000	2,571		2.2%
2010	2,554		−0.7%
2020	2,444		−4.3%
Source: Census Bureau. Census 1960-1990 2000, 2010.

As of the census of 2000, there were 2,571 people, 956 households, and 738 families residing in the township. The population density was 71.1 inhabitants per square mile (27.5/km^{2}). There were 1,003 housing units at an average density of 27.7 units per square mile (10.7 units/km^{2}). The racial makeup of the township was 96.93% White, 0.19% African American, 1.21% Native American, 0.08% Asian, 0.12% Pacific Islander, 0.31% from other races, and 1.17% from two or more races. Hispanic or Latino of any race were 1.56% of the population.

There were 956 households, out of which 34.7% had children under the age of 18 living with them, 64.5% were married couples living together, 8.2% had a female householder with no husband present, and 22.7% were non-families. 19.0% of all households were made up of individuals, and 9.5% had someone living alone who was 65 years of age or older. The average household size was 2.69 and the average family size was 3.04.

In the township the population was spread out, with 27.3% under the age of 18, 7.7% from 18 to 24, 28.1% from 25 to 44, 23.0% from 45 to 64, and 13.9% who were 65 years of age or older. The median age was 37 years. For every 100 females, there were 98.5 males. For every 100 females age 18 and over, there were 95.5 males.

The median income for a household in the township was $43,929, and the median income for a family was $49,607. Males had a median income of $37,039 versus $26,500 for females. The per capita income for the township was $18,864. About 3.7% of families and 5.2% of the population were below the poverty line, including 6.2% of those under age 18 and 5.2% of those age 65 or over.
