= Pavilion Township, Michigan =

- Charter township
- Charter Township of Pavilion
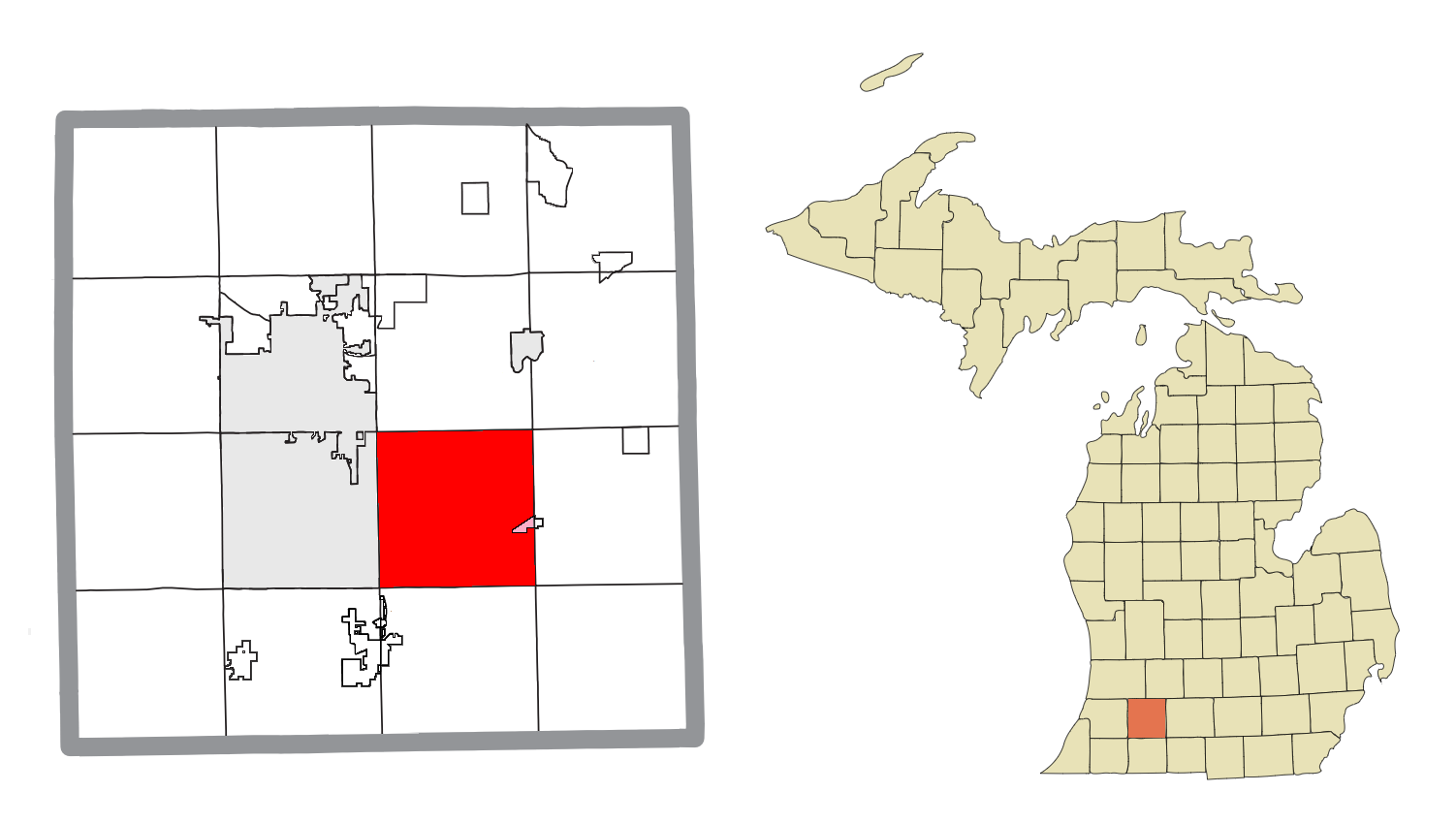
- Location within Kalamazoo County and an administered portion of the CDP of Scotts

- Location within the state of Michigan Location within the United States
- Coordinates: 42°11′46″N 85°28′38″W
- Country: United States
- State: Michigan
- County: Kalamazoo

Area
  - Total: 36.4 sq mi (94.2 km^{2})
  - Land: 35.0 sq mi (90.7 km^{2})
  - Water: 1.4 sq mi (3.5 km^{2})
- Elevation: 850 ft (260 m)

Population (2020)
  - Total: 6,387
  - Density: 182/sq mi (70.4/km^{2})
- Time zone: UTC-5 (Eastern (EST))
  - Summer (DST): UTC-4 (EDT)
- FIPS code: 26-62960
- GNIS feature ID: 1626885
- Website: www.paviliontwpmi.gov

Pavilion Charter Township is a charter township of Kalamazoo County in the U.S. state of Michigan. The population was 6,387 at the 2020 census, up from 6,222 at the 2010 census. It contains part of the census-designated place of Scotts, which it shares with Climax Township.

== Geography ==
The township is in central Kalamazoo County and is bordered to the west by the city of Portage. The city of Kalamazoo touches the northwest corner of the township. According to the United States Census Bureau, the township has a total area of 36.4 square miles (94.2 km^{2}), of which 35.0 square miles (90.7 km^{2}) are land and 1.4 square miles (3.5 km^{2}), or 3.74%, are water. Several lakes occupy the township, the largest of which are Long Lake on the western border and Indian Lake on the southern border.

== Demographics ==
As of the census of 2000, there were 5,829 people, 2,114 households, and 1,644 families residing in the township. The population density was 167.1 inhabitants per square mile (64.5/km^{2}). There were 2,253 housing units at an average density of 64.6 per square mile (24.9/km^{2}). The racial makeup of the township was 95.61% White, 1.13% African American, 0.45% Native American, 0.29% Asian, 0.03% Pacific Islander, 0.65% from other races, and 1.84% from two or more races. Hispanic or Latino of any race were 2.08% of the population.

There were 2,114 households, out of which 38.6% had children under the age of 18 living with them, 63.4% were married couples living together, 10.0% had a female householder with no husband present, and 22.2% were non-families. 17.1% of all households were made up of individuals, and 4.9% had someone living alone who was 65 years of age or older. The average household size was 2.75 and the average family size was 3.08.

In the township the population was spread out, with 28.5% under the age of 18, 7.0% from 18 to 24, 30.6% from 25 to 44, 24.7% from 45 to 64, and 9.2% who were 65 years of age or older. The median age was 36 years. For every 100 females, there were 98.9 males. For every 100 females age 18 and over, there were 97.4 males.

The median income for a household in the township was $46,675, and the median income for a family was $52,135. Males had a median income of $39,773 versus $28,340 for females. The per capita income for the township was $20,351. About 5.6% of families and 7.5% of the population were below the poverty line, including 8.9% of those under age 18 and 4.7% of those age 65 or over.
