= Newton Township, Calhoun County, Michigan =

Newton Township, Michigan
- Township
- Location within the state of Michigan
- Coordinates: 42°11′59″N 85°7′46″W
- Country: United States
- State: Michigan
- County: Calhoun

Area
  - Total: 36.4 sq mi (94.2 km^{2})
  - Land: 36.0 sq mi (93.2 km^{2})
  - Water: 0.39 sq mi (1.0 km^{2})
- Elevation: 922 ft (281 m)

Population (2020)
  - Total: 2,781
  - Density: 77.3/sq mi (29.8/km^{2})
- Time zone: UTC-5 (Eastern (EST))
  - Summer (DST): UTC-4 (EDT)
- FIPS code: 26-57620
- GNIS feature ID: 1626804
- Website: newtontwp.org

Newton Township is a civil township of Calhoun County in the U.S. state of Michigan. The population was 2,781 at the 2020 census. The township was named after Newton, Massachusetts.

== Geography ==
According to the United States Census Bureau, the township has a total area of 36.4 square miles (94.2 km^{2}), of which 36.0 square miles (93.2 km^{2}) is land and 0.39 square miles (1.0 km^{2}), or 1.04%, is water.

== Demographics ==
Historical population
Census	Pop.	Note	%±
1960	1,469		—
1970	1,327		−9.7%
1980	1,979		49.1%
1990	2,025		2.3%
2000	2,493		23.1%
2010	2,551		2.3%
2020	2,781		9.0%
Source: Census Bureau. Census 1960- 2000, 2010.

As of the census of 2000, there were 2,493 people, 1,017 households, and 768 families residing in the township. The population density was 69.4 inhabitants per square mile (26.8/km^{2}). There were 1,077 housing units at an average density of 30.0 per square mile (11.6/km^{2}). The racial makeup of the township was 97.11% White, 0.40% African American, 0.24% Native American, 1.04% Asian, 0.12% Pacific Islander, 0.36% from other races, and 0.72% from two or more races. Hispanic or Latino of any race were 1.44% of the population.

There were 1,017 households, out of which 27.6% had children under the age of 18 living with them, 67.5% were married couples living together, 5.3% had a female householder with no husband present, and 24.4% were non-families. 22.2% of all households were made up of individuals, and 10.4% had someone living alone who was 65 years of age or older. The average household size was 2.45 and the average family size was 2.84.

In the township the population was spread out, with 22.4% under the age of 18, 4.6% from 18 to 24, 27.1% from 25 to 44, 30.4% from 45 to 64, and 15.5% who were 65 years of age or older. The median age was 43 years. For every 100 females, there were 96.5 males. For every 100 females age 18 and over, there were 93.3 males.

The median income for a household in the township was $48,568, and the median income for a family was $53,608. Males had a median income of $41,420 versus $30,549 for females. The per capita income for the township was $23,569. About 3.6% of families and 5.4% of the population were below the poverty line, including 9.5% of those under age 18 and 5.4% of those age 65 or over.
