= Climax Township, Michigan =

- Civil township
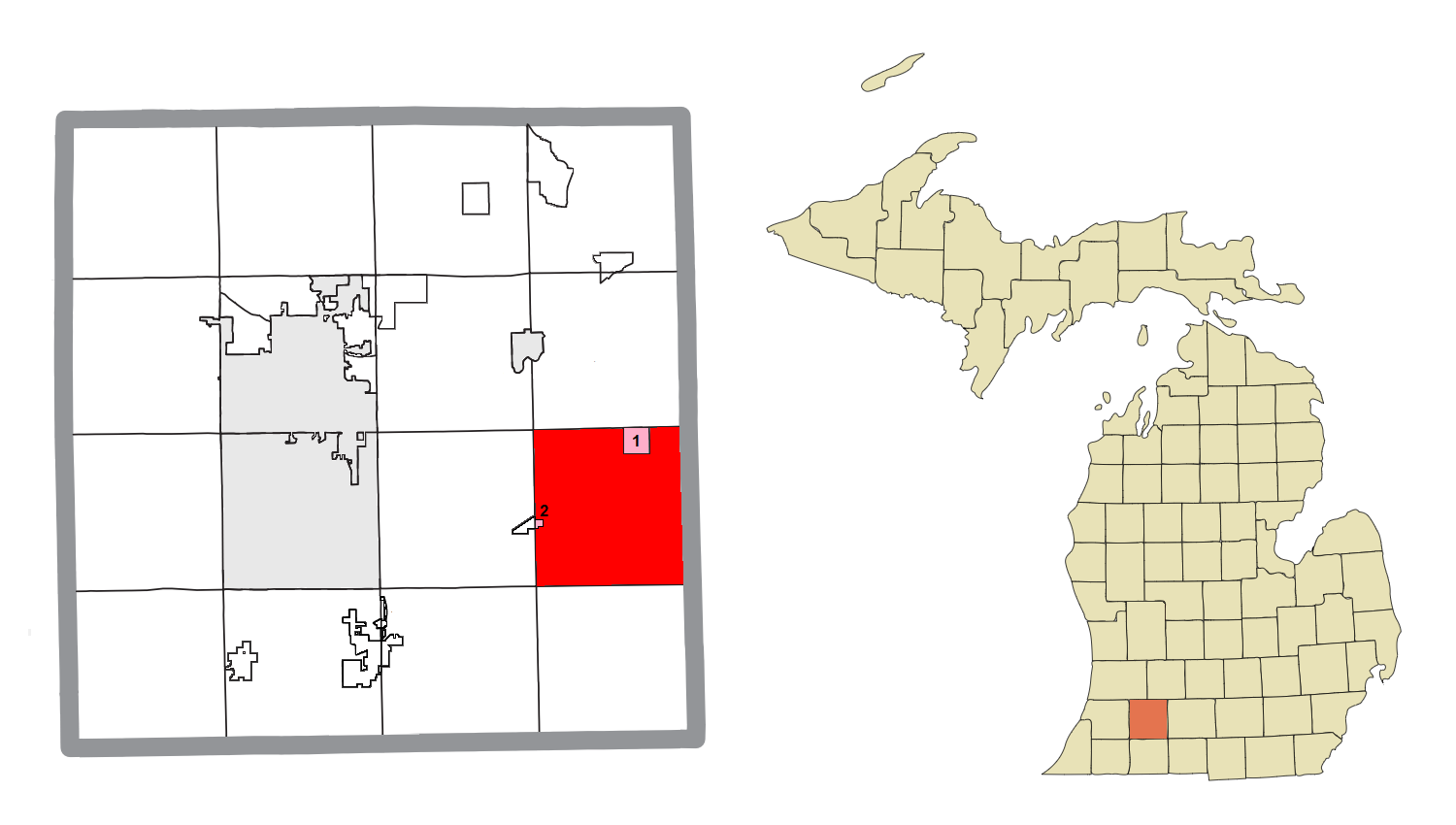
- Location within Kalamazoo County and the administered village of Climax (1) and portion of the CDP of Scotts (2)

- Location within the state of Michigan Location within the United States
- Coordinates: 42°13′N 85°22′W
- Country: United States
- State: Michigan
- County: Kalamazoo

Area
  - Total: 36.3 sq mi (94.0 km^{2})
  - Land: 36.1 sq mi (93.6 km^{2})
  - Water: 0.15 sq mi (0.4 km^{2})
- Elevation: 942 ft (287 m)

Population (2020)
  - Total: 2,364
  - Density: 65.4/sq mi (25.3/km^{2})
- Time zone: UTC-5 (Eastern (EST))
  - Summer (DST): UTC-4 (EDT)
- ZIP code: 49034
- Area code: 269
- FIPS code: 26-077-16460
- GNIS feature ID: 1626098
- Website: https://www.climaxtownship.org/

Climax Township is a civil township of Kalamazoo County in the U.S. state of Michigan. The 2020 census recorded a population of 2,364.

The village of Climax is located within the township along the northern boundary with Charleston Township, as is part of the census-designated place of Scotts, which is located along the boundary with Pavilion Township.

== Geography ==
The township is in eastern Kalamazoo County, bordered to the east by Calhoun County. According to the United States Census Bureau, the township has a total area of 36.3 square miles (94.0 km^{2}), of which 36.1 square miles (93.6 km^{2}) are land and 0.2 square miles (0.4 km^{2}), or 0.46%, are water.

== Demographics ==
As of the census of 2000, there were 2,412 people, 885 households, and 693 families residing in the township. The population density was 66.6 inhabitants per square mile (25.7/km^{2}). There were 927 housing units at an average density of 25.6 per square mile (9.9/km^{2}). The racial makeup of the township was 97.68% White, 0.37% African American, 0.46% Native American, 0.21% Asian, 0.04% Pacific Islander, 0.46% from other races, and 0.79% from two or more races. Hispanic or Latino of any race were 1.58% of the population.

There were 885 households, out of which 36.6% had children under the age of 18 living with them, 69.3% were married couples living together, 6.4% had a female householder with no husband present, and 21.6% were non-families. 18.1% of all households were made up of individuals, and 7.9% had someone living alone who was 65 years of age or older. The average household size was 2.73 and the average family size was 3.09.

In the township the population was spread out, with 27.6% under the age of 18, 6.6% from 18 to 24, 28.3% from 25 to 44, 27.0% from 45 to 64, and 10.4% who were 65 years of age or older. The median age was 38 years. For every 100 females, there were 99.2 males. For every 100 females age 18 and over, there were 98.9 males.

The median income for a household in the township was $47,620, and the median income for a family was $49,800. Males had a median income of $35,896 versus $27,194 for females. The per capita income for the township was $19,381. About 2.5% of families and 3.7% of the population were below the poverty line, including 4.6% of those under age 18 and 4.0% of those age 65 or over.
