= Athens, Michigan =

- Village
- Location of Athens in Calhoun County, Michigan
- Coordinates: 42°5′12″N 85°14′8″W
- Country: United States
- State: Michigan
- County: Calhoun
- Township: Athens

Government

Area
  - Total: 1.01 sq mi (2.62 km^{2})
  - Land: 1.01 sq mi (2.61 km^{2})
  - Water: 0.0077 sq mi (0.02 km^{2})
- Elevation: 889 ft (271 m)

Population (2020)
  - Total: 936
  - Density: 929.4/sq mi (358.85/km^{2})
- Time zone: UTC-5 (Eastern (EST))
  - Summer (DST): UTC-4 (EDT)
- ZIP code: 49011
- Area code: 269
- FIPS code: 26-03880
- GNIS feature ID: 2398004
- Website: http://athensarea.org/

Athens is a village in Calhoun County in the U.S. state of Michigan. The population was 936 at the 2020 census. The village is located in southern Athens Township, and is part of the Battle Creek, Michigan Metropolitan Statistical Area. It was settled in 1831.

== Naming ==
The village was named "Athens" after Athens, NY from where many of its early settlers came. It was the naming of its New York namesake that was directly inspired by the ancient city of Athens.

== Geography ==
According to the United States Census Bureau, the village has a total area of 1.02 square miles (2.64 km^{2}), of which 1.01 square miles (2.62 km^{2}) is land and 0.01 square miles (0.03 km^{2}) is water. The Nottawa Creek, also known as the Nottawa River, flows through Athens.

== Demographics ==
Historical population
Census	Pop.	Note	%±
1880	597		—
1890	441		−26.1%
1900	583		32.2%
1910	631		8.2%
1920	553		−12.4%
1930	622		12.5%
1940	658		5.8%
1950	768		16.7%
1960	966		25.8%
1970	996		3.1%
1980	960		−3.6%
1990	990		3.1%
2000	1,111		12.2%
2010	1,024		−7.8%
2020	936		−8.6%
Source: Census Bureau. Census 1960- 2000, 2010.

=== 2010 census ===
As of the census of 2010, there were 1,024 people, 387 households, and 279 families living in the village. The population density was 1,013.9 inhabitants per square mile (391.5/km^{2}). There were 424 housing units at an average density of 419.8 per square mile (162.1/km^{2}). The racial makeup of the village was 95.4% White, 0.5% African American, 0.9% Native American, 0.1% Asian, 0.1% Pacific Islander, 0.8% from other races, and 2.2% from two or more races. Hispanic or Latino of any race were 1.4% of the population.

There were 387 households, of which 34.6% had children under the age of 18 living with them, 54.3% were married couples living together, 11.4% had a female householder with no husband present, 6.5% had a male householder with no wife present, and 27.9% were non-families. 22.5% of all households were made up of individuals, and 9.8% had someone living alone who was 65 years of age or older. The average household size was 2.65 and the average family size was 3.08.

The median age in the village was 38.9 years. 24% of residents were under the age of 18; 10% were between the ages of 18 and 24; 25% were from 25 to 44; 26.9% were from 45 to 64; and 14.1% were 65 years of age or older. The gender makeup of the village was 50.3% male and 49.7% female.

=== 2000 census ===
As of the census of 2000, there were 1,111 people, 397 households, and 298 families living in the village. The population density was 1,115.7 inhabitants per square mile (430.8/km^{2}). There were 424 housing units at an average density of 425.8 per square mile (164.4/km^{2}). The racial makeup of the village was 97.48% White, 0.27% African American, 0.81% Native American, 0.27% Pacific Islander, 0.09% from other races, and 1.08% from two or more races. Hispanic or Latino of any race were 1.89% of the population.

There were 397 households, out of which 41.6% had children under the age of 18 living with them, 61.2% were married couples living together, 10.1% had a female householder with no husband present, and 24.7% were non-families. 20.9% of all households were made up of individuals, and 9.3% had someone living alone who was 65 years of age or older. The average household size was 2.80 and the average family size was 3.23.

In the village, the population was spread out, with 32.3% under the age of 18, 7.7% from 18 to 24, 32.3% from 25 to 44, 16.0% from 45 to 64, and 11.6% who were 65 years of age or older. The median age was 32 years. For every 100 females, there were 93.9 males. For every 100 females age 18 and over, there were 90.4 males.

The median income for a household in the village was $42,083, and the median income for a family was $49,375. Males had a median income of $36,618 versus $26,875 for females. The per capita income for the village was $16,409. About 3.7% of families and 5.3% of the population were below the poverty line, including 5.9% of those under age 18 and 6.3% of those age 65 or over.
