= Leroy Township, Calhoun County, Michigan =

Leroy Township, Michigan
- Township
- Location within the state of Michigan
- Coordinates: 42°12′10″N 85°13′58″W
- Country: United States
- State: Michigan
- County: Calhoun

Area
  - Total: 36.4 sq mi (94.4 km^{2})
  - Land: 36.0 sq mi (93.2 km^{2})
  - Water: 0.46 sq mi (1.2 km^{2})
- Elevation: 928 ft (283 m)

Population (2020)
  - Total: 3,659
  - Density: 102/sq mi (39.3/km^{2})
- Time zone: UTC-5 (Eastern (EST))
  - Summer (DST): UTC-4 (EDT)
- FIPS code: 26-47060
- GNIS feature ID: 1626607
- Website: leroytwp-calhounmi.gov

Leroy Township is a civil township of Calhoun County in the U.S. state of Michigan. It is part of the Battle Creek, Michigan Metropolitan Statistical Area. The population was 3,659 at the 2020 census.

== History ==
Leroy Township was established in 1837.

== Geography ==
Leroy Township is located in western Calhoun County, bordered by the city of Battle Creek to the north. Kalamazoo County is to the west. Unincorporated communities within the township include Pine Creek, East Leroy, Joppa, West Leroy, Morgan Corners, and Sonoma.

According to the United States Census Bureau, the township has a total area of 36.4 square miles (94.4 km^{2}), of which 36.0 square miles (93.2 km^{2}) is land and 0.46 square miles (1.2 km^{2}), or 1.23%, is water.

== Demographics ==
Historical population
Census	Pop.	Note	%±
1960	2,239		—
1970	2,679		19.7%
1980	2,929		9.3%
1990	3,026		3.3%
2000	3,240		7.1%
2010	3,712		14.6%
2020	3,659		−1.4%
Source: Census Bureau. Census 1960- 2000, 2010.

As of the census of 2000, there were 3,240 people, 1,190 households, and 937 families residing in the township. The population density was 90.2 inhabitants per square mile (34.8/km^{2}). There were 1,250 housing units at an average density of 34.8 per square mile (13.4/km^{2}). The racial makeup of the township was 96.70% White, 0.68% African American, 0.43% Native American, 0.15% Asian, 0.65% from other races, and 1.39% from two or more races. Hispanic or Latino of any race were 1.67% of the population.

There were 1,190 households, out of which 34.5% had children under the age of 18 living with them, 68.2% were married couples living together, 7.4% had a female householder with no husband present, and 21.2% were non-families. 17.3% of all households were made up of individuals, and 6.6% had someone living alone who was 65 years of age or older. The average household size was 2.70 and the average family size was 3.04.

In the township the population was spread out, with 25.9% under the age of 18, 6.5% from 18 to 24, 27.0% from 25 to 44, 28.2% from 45 to 64, and 12.3% who were 65 years of age or older. The median age was 40 years. For every 100 females, there were 96.2 males. For every 100 females age 18 and over, there were 96.4 males.

The median income for a household in the township was $52,361, and the median income for a family was $54,754. Males had a median income of $40,938 versus $29,517 for females. The per capita income for the township was $22,799. About 6.1% of families and 8.6% of the population were below the poverty line, including 9.9% of those under age 18 and 10.8% of those age 65 or over.
