= Potterville Public Schools =

School district in Michigan

Address
- 425 East Main Street Potterville, Eaton County, Michigan, 48876; United States

District information
- Grades: PreKindergarten–12
- Schools: 3
- Budget: $20,232,000 2022-2023 total expenditures
- NCES District ID: 2629160

Students and staff
- Students: 762 (2024-2025)
- Teachers: 50 (on an FTE basis) (2024-2025)
- Staff: 117.59 FTE (2024-2025)
- Student–teacher ratio: 15.24 (2024-2025)
- District mascot: Vikings

Other information
- Website: www.ppsvikings.org

Potterville Public Schools is a public school district in Eaton County, Michigan. It serves Potterville and parts of the townships of Benton, Oneida and Windsor.

== History ==
Potterville's old school, as photographed in the 1966 high school yearbook, was a two-story brick building with a hip roof and a central cupola. It contained all grades in the district until a new elementary school was built around 1954.

Replacing the old Potterville High School was a matter of controversy. A bond issue passed in September 1964 to fund construction, but that November, six district residents obtained a court injunction to halt the sale of bonds because they wanted the district dissolved and divided amongst Charlotte Public Schools, Grand Ledge Public Schools, and Waverly Community Schools. Voters overwhelmingly rejected the dissolution on February 15, 1965, but several groups of property owners had already transferred their land to other districts, contributing to the district's irregular boundaries and raising doubts about its viability within the Michigan Department of Education.

Another bond issue passed in 1967, as the middle/high school was under construction, to expand the project. The new building opened on February 12, 1969. The architecture firm was Jackson, Manson and Kane.

In fall 1974, a new junior high building opened next to the high school. Only four classrooms were square, and the others had more irregular shapes, which were preferred by teachers when choosing their rooms. As described in the newspaper, the school "certainly is colorful. Unlike the drab institutional colors, the school has tangerine, chartreuse, yellow, gold and olive—on lockers, walls and other spots in the air-conditioned school."

Declining enrollment led to the district's old elementary school to close, and the junior high became the elementary building as grades seven and eight moved to the high school. In a 1989 profile of the district in the Lansing State Journal, the district's financial difficulties were illustrated by its inadequate science curriculum and outdated books in the high school library. William Heath, then-superintendent, thought again that the district might be dissolved.

Enrollment grew between the 1999–2000 school year and the 2010–2011 school year, and three bond issues were passed by voters between 1999 and 2021. The 2021 bond issue funded an auxiliary gymnasium at the middle/high school and an early childhood center at the elementary school.

== Schools ==
Potterville's schools share a campus on north side of Potterville.

Schools in Potterville Public Schools district
| School | Address | Notes |
|---|---|---|
| Potterville Middle/High School | 425 East Main Street, Potterville | Grades 6–12. Built 1969. |
| Potterville Elementary | 511 East Main Street, Potterville | Grades K-5. Built 1974. |
| Little Vikings Early Childhood Center | 511 East Main Street, Potterville | Preschool attached to Potterville Elementary. |
