= Skyway Estates Airport =

Airport in Michigan, United States

- IATA: none; ICAO: none; FAA LID: 60G

Summary
- Airport type: Public
- Operator: Keith Gibbs
- Location: Eaton Rapids Township, Michigan
- Time zone: UTC−05:00 (-5)
  - Summer (DST): UTC−04:00 (-4)
- Elevation AMSL: 931 ft / 284 m
- Coordinates: 42°35′01.131″N 84°39′04.93″W
- Interactive map of Skyway Estates Airport

Runways
Direction	Length		Surface
Direction	ft	m	Surface
8/26	2,653	809	Turf

Statistics (2019)
- Aircraft Movements: 504
- Based Aircraft: 10

Skyway Estates Airport (ICAO: K60G, FAA LID: 60G) is a privately owned, public use general aviation airport located approximately 4 miles north of Eaton Rapids in Eaton Rapids Township, Eaton County, Michigan, United States.

== Facilities and aircraft ==
Skyway Estates Airport has one runway. The airport is attended intermittently, and only during the day.

The airport has one runway, designated as runway 8/26. It measures 2,653 x 100 ft (809 x 30 m) and is made of turf. For the 12-month period ending December 31, 2019, the airport has 504 aircraft operations per year, an average of 42 per month. It is entirely general aviation. For the same time period, 10 aircraft are based at the airport, all single-engine airplanes.

The airport does not have a fixed-base operator, and no fuel is available.

The airport is accessible by road from Columbia Highway, and is located approximately 1 mile west of M-99.

== Accidents and incidents ==
- On October 13, 1996, a Dellicker Starduster Too SA300 was destroyed when it impacted the terrain during the initial climb following takeoff from Skyway Estates Airports. Witnesses reported that the pilot performed an aggressive pull up and subsequently lost control of the airplane a few hundred feet above the ground, entering a steep right turn. The probable cause of the accident was found to be the pilot's failure to maintain adequate airspeed and subsequent inadvertent stall of the airplane.
- On January 13, 2022, Piper PA-28 Cherokee crashed after departure from Skyway Estates airport. The crash is under investigation.

== See also ==
- List of airports in Michigan
