= Eaton Intermediate School District =

School district in Michigan

Eaton Regional Education Service Agency (formerly called Eaton Intermediate School District) includes portions of Eaton County, Barry County, Ionia County, and Ingham County in Michigan, United States. Its offices are located in Charlotte, Eaton County, Michigan.

== School districts ==
- Charlotte Public Schools
- Eaton Rapids Public Schools
- Grand Ledge Public Schools
- Maple Valley Schools
- Oneida Strange Township School District 3
- Potterville Community Schools

=== Former school districts ===
- Bellevue Community Schools
- Olivet Community Schools
- Roxand Township School District 12
- Waverly Community Schools

== Schools ==
- Early On (group and home based services)
- Great Start Readiness Program Classrooms (located at local school districts)
- Eaton Great Start (located at Southridge Facility)
- Career Preparation Center (located at LCC West Campus)
- Meadowview Offsite (Special Education) (located at local school districts)
- Meadowview School (Special Education) (located at Eaton RESA Packard Facility)
- Meadowview Post Secondary Transition Program (located downtown Charlotte)
