= Charlotte Public Schools =

School district in Michigan, U.S.

Address
- 378 State Street Charlotte, Eaton, Michigan, 48813; United States

District information
- Grades: Pre-Kindergarten-12
- Superintendent: Dr. Mandy Stewart
- Schools: 7
- Budget: $57,937,000 2022-2023 total expenditures
- NCES District ID: 2608770

Students and staff
- Students: 2,293 (2024-2025)
- Teachers: 130.57 (on an FTE basis) (2024-2025)
- Staff: 289.38 FTE (2024-2025)
- Student–teacher ratio: 17.56 (2024-2025)

Other information
- Website: www.charlotteorioles.com

Charlotte Public Schools is a public school district in Eaton County, Michigan. It serves Charlotte, and parts of the townships of Benton, Brookfield, Carmel, Chester, Eaton, Eaton Rapids, Oneida, Roxand and Windsor.

== History ==
=== 1841 to 1959 ===
The district's early history is discussed in Charlotte High School's 1918 yearbook: Charlotte's first school board was elected in 1841. One of the small village's then-oldest homes was then repaired and used for the school. A single window was installed for light. The high school was an informal affair in the printing office of William Johnson, a man of "rare intellectual ability" who "created enthusiasm and interest" in the school. He taught the writing of speeches and satire, and his students' assignments were "renowned throughout the county for their originality."

By 1850, this school prospered into Charlotte Academy, a private school, but it was not financially successful, and "its greatest accomplishment was rocking as a cradle in a high wind." Around the same time, the public school district rented a building for its own academy. The district became a union school district in 1859, and in 1866 built a central school of its own.

As of 1865, as reported in the Detroit Free Press, "The Charlotte Union School is now in flourishing condition. Having secured the services of a competent principal, the Board of Trustees would invite the attention of the inhabitants of the surrounding country to the facilities offered here for the education of their sons and daughters." The first class graduated from Charlotte High School, housed within the Union School, in 1874.

1885 saw the building of Hawthorne school, near the 1866 Union School, parts of which served grades five, six and seven until 1955. It was torn down in 1956 to provide room for an addition to the high school.

A large addition to the Union School, by then known as the high school, had also been built in 1914 and dedicated in 1915. Claire Allen of Jackson was the architect. This addition, at least in part, was attached to the facade of the 1866 school building. Authors of the 1918 high school yearbook wrote, "The new building is passably convenient ... There are plenty of windows and always an abundance of fresh air."

In 1935, the Public Works Administration contributed funds to the construction of a large expansion of the high school. According to the Grand Rapids Press, "the old part of the present building will be razed and the addition constructed in 1914 retained. It will be remodeled and repaired." Warren S. Holmes was the architect. In March 1937, the new high school was dedicated with a grand pageant. Several additions were built in the 1950s, including a swimming pool addition in 1956.

=== 1960 to present ===
The district was continuing to see growing enrollment. Representatives from the architecture firm Warren Holmes Company discussed district facilities with the Citizens Advisory Committee, which in 1961 decided to build a junior high school for grades six, seven and eight that could later be expanded to become the high school. The building was ready in fall 1964, when the Battle Creek Enquirer reported on schedules, fees, and dress codes for the students: "Boys, slacks with belt, or self-belted and shirts must be tucked in; girls, simple dresses or skirts of acceptable length and with simple blouses."

The present high school was built in 1970 as an addition to the junior high school. The gymnasium featured a unique dome shape. The architect was Louis C. Kingscott and Associates. The former high school then became a junior high building.

Charlotte Middle School opened in fall 2002. In 2001, voters approved additional funds to add a pool to the new middle school project and add an 825-seat auditorium to the high school.

The 1914/1937 high school building remains at 301 Horatio Avenue. Although a portion of the building was renovated into apartments around 2004, the entire project was not completed as planned and much of the building remains vacant.

== Schools ==
Schools in Charlotte Public Schools district
| School | Address | Notes |
|---|---|---|
| Charlotte High School | 378 State Street, Charlotte | Grades 9-12. Opened 1964, high school expansion opened 1970. |
| Charlotte Middle School | 1068 Carlisle Highway, Charlotte | Grades 6-8. Opened 2002. |
| Charlotte Upper Elementary | 1068 Carlisle Highway, Charlotte | Grades 4-6. Shares a building with Charlotte Middle School. |
| Parkview Elementary | 301 E. Kalamo, Charlotte | Grades 1-3. |
| Washington Elementary | 525 High St., Charlotte | Grades 1-3. |
| Galewood Early Elementary | 512 E. Lovett, Charlotte | Grades PreK-K. |
| Weymouth Child Development Center | 346 State Street, Charlotte | Child care for ages 6 months to 12 years |
| Project Success | 378 State St., Charlotte | Alternative high school within Charlotte High School. Grades 9-12. |
