= Shaytown =

Shaytown may refer to:

- Shaytown, Michigan
- Shaytown, New Jersey
