= Lake Interstate =

Lake in the state of Michigan, United States

- Location within Michigan
- Location: Eaton County, Michigan
- Coordinates: 42°39′52″N 84°41′07″W
- Type: Lake

Lake Interstate is a 20-acre (8.1 ha) fishing lake located in Eaton County, Michigan. The lake got its name due to its close proximity to Interstate 69 - with the eastern shoreline being about 100 feet (30 m) from the interstate.

== Overview ==
Lake Interstate is a "dock and shore" fishing lake located southwest of Lansing, the state's capital city. The lake features one fishing pier, on the southern section of the lake. Residents can fish from the pier, or from the shoreline. The lake is available for residents to use year round, and there is no fee charged to enter. Fish that are commonly found in the lake are catfish, largemouth bass, bullhead, sunfish, yellow perch, sucker and others. On occasion the lake is stocked with fish. Ice fishing is common on the lake during the winter months.

The lake is about 15 feet (4.6 m) deep on average, with a maximum depth of 35 feet (10.7 m).

It is located less than two miles southwest of Lake Delta.

== Lake Interstate Game Area ==
Lake Interstate sits on Lake Interstate Game Area, 123 acres (50 ha) of land that include a trail and hunting opportunities. The land was given to the Department of Natural Resources (DNR) by the Department of Transportation, for wildlife management purposes. The game area is home to a variety of wildlife, including whitetail deer, woodchucks, rabbits, ducks, Canadian geese, turtles, and more.

=== Highways ===
- I-69
