= 1916 United States presidential election in Michigan =

- November 7, 1916

All 15 Michigan votes to the Electoral College
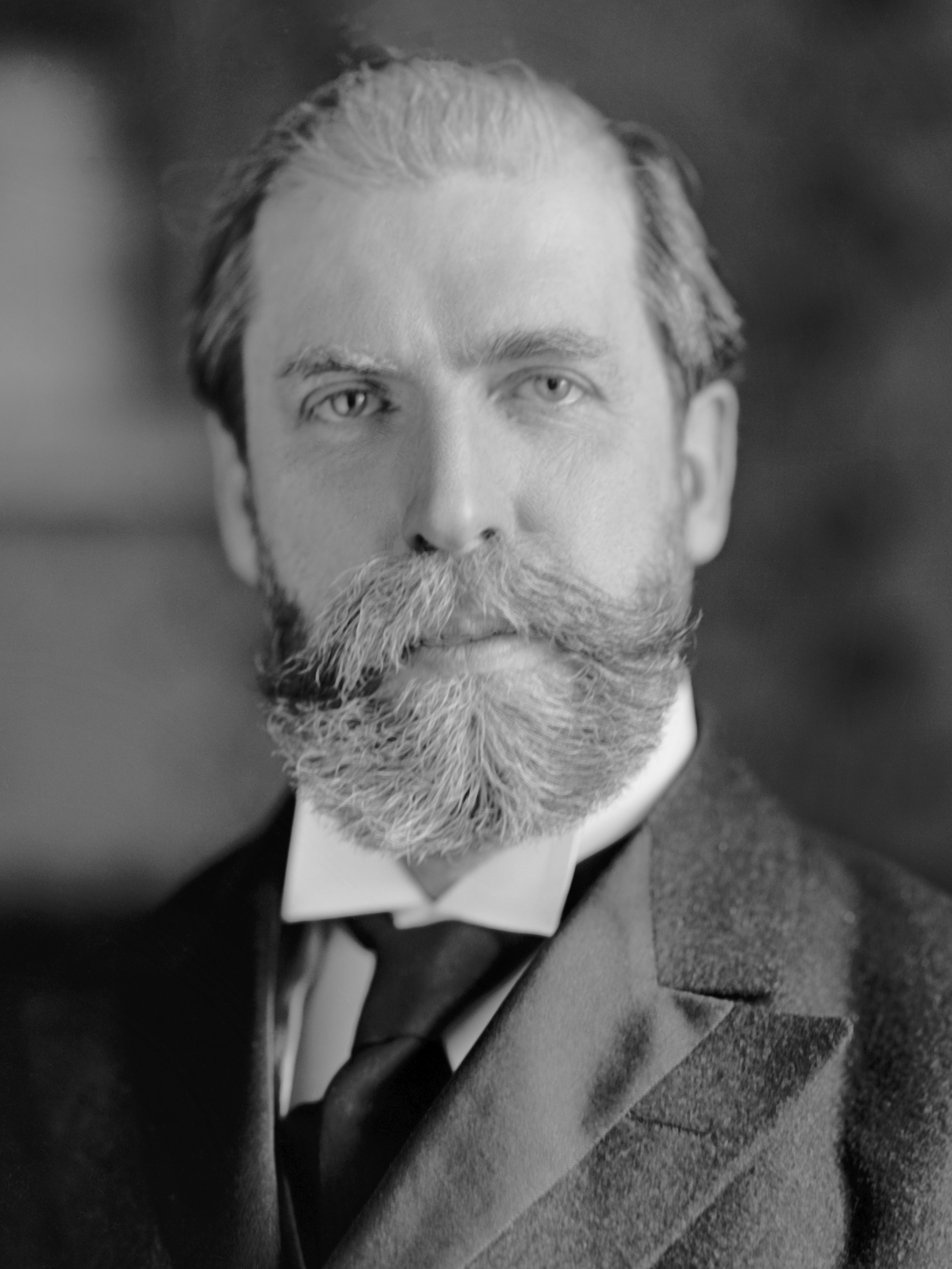

Nominee	Charles Evans Hughes	Woodrow Wilson
Party	Republican	Democratic
Home state	New York	New Jersey
Running mate	Charles W. Fairbanks	Thomas R. Marshall
Electoral vote	15	0
Popular vote	339,097	286,775
Percentage	52.09%	44.05%
County results
Hughes
40–50%
50–60%
60–70%
70–80%
Wilson
40–50%
50–60%
President before election
Woodrow Wilson
Democratic
Elected President
Woodrow Wilson
Democratic

The 1916 United States presidential election in Michigan took place on November 7, 1916, as part of the 1916 United States presidential election. Voters chose 15 representatives, or electors, to the Electoral College, who voted for president and vice president.

Following the Panic of 1893 and the Populist movement, Michigan would turn from a competitive Republican-leaning state into a rigidly one-party polity dominated by the Republican Party. The dominance of the culture of the Lower Peninsula by anti-slavery Yankees would be augmented by the turn of formerly Democratic-leaning German Catholics away from that party as a result of the remodelled party's agrarian and free silver sympathies, which became rigidly opposed by both the upper class and workers who followed them. The state Democratic Party was further crippled via the Populist movement severing its critical financial ties with business and commerce in Michigan as in other Northern states. A brief turn of the strongly evangelical Cabinet Counties toward the Populist movement in the 1896 presidential election would reverse itself following the return to prosperity under President William McKinley, so that these joined in Republican hegemony until the Great Depression.

In the 1894 elections, the Democratic Party lost all but one seat in the Michigan legislature, and over the four ensuing decades the party would never make major gains there. Unlike the other states of the Upper Midwest, the Yankee influence on the culture of the Lower Peninsula was so strong that left-wing third parties did not provide significant opposition to the Republicans, nor was there more than a moderate degree of coordinated factionalism within the hegemonic Michigan Republican Party.

Aided by the support of incumbent Governor Chase Osborn and state party leader Frank Knox, “Bull Moose” nominee Theodore Roosevelt would carry Michigan by a double-digit margin over conservative incumbent Taft in 1912. However, Roosevelt's personal interests took over from developing his party after the election, and after voting on the first ballot for favorite son Henry Ford due to his strong desire to keep America out of World War I, Michigan's Republicans would soon shift their support in the national convention to eventual nominee Charles Evans Hughes.

At the beginning of the campaign, Michigan, where Republicans had regained their customary near-monopoly of House and state legislative seats in 1914, was seen by the Hughes campaign as a safe state. However, early polls, taken only from rural areas of Central Michigan, indicated Wilson was receiving a substantial proportion of the 1912 “Bull Moose” vote. No further polls would be taken in the state, and in the end Hughes won slightly more than 52 percent of the popular vote. Wilson is one of three presidents (along with George W. Bush and Grover Cleveland) to win two terms without ever carrying the state, and the only Democrat to do so in two consecutive elections (Cleveland won two non-consecutive elections in 1884 and 1892).

== Results ==
General Election Results
Party	Pledged to	Elector	Votes
Republican	Charles Evans Hughes	Charles C. Simons	339,097
Republican	Charles Evans Hughes	James Couzens	338,725
Republican	Charles Evans Hughes	William J. Livingstone	338,065
Republican	Charles Evans Hughes	Bernard J. Onen	337,937
Republican	Charles Evans Hughes	Edmund O. Dewey	337,901
Republican	Charles Evans Hughes	John E. Wallace	337,887
Republican	Charles Evans Hughes	Guy E. Smith	337,803
Republican	Charles Evans Hughes	J. Russel Fisk	337,800
Republican	Charles Evans Hughes	Edwey C. Reid	337,737
Republican	Charles Evans Hughes	Dallas Boudeman	337,726
Republican	Charles Evans Hughes	Holden A. Putnam	337,711
Republican	Charles Evans Hughes	Benjamin Gero	337,678
Republican	Charles Evans Hughes	Homer A. Guck	337,664
Republican	Charles Evans Hughes	Hugh A. McPherson	337,389
Republican	Charles Evans Hughes	Miner S. Keeler	337,181
Democratic	Woodrow Wilson	Charles M. Wilson	286,775
Democratic	Woodrow Wilson	John W. Adams	285,151
Democratic	Woodrow Wilson	Norman Morrish	283,922
Democratic	Woodrow Wilson	Edward Frensdorf	283,897
Democratic	Woodrow Wilson	Arthur F. Jacques	283,808
Democratic	Woodrow Wilson	Frank A. Kelble	283,796
Democratic	Woodrow Wilson	Joseph B. Hendee	283,782
Democratic	Woodrow Wilson	William J. McAneeny	283,736
Democratic	Woodrow Wilson	Daniel W. Goodenough	283,684
Democratic	Woodrow Wilson	Robert Hyslop	283,662
Democratic	Woodrow Wilson	Elmer J. Ottaway	283,638
Democratic	Woodrow Wilson	Henry Heisman	283,631
Democratic	Woodrow Wilson	Clyde W. Hecox	283,614
Democratic	Woodrow Wilson	Knute S. Markstrum	283,520
Democratic	Woodrow Wilson	Joseph Merrell	283,253
Socialist	Allan L. Benson	S. H. Slagle	16,120
Socialist	Allan L. Benson	Anna Karlin	16,028
Socialist	Allan L. Benson	William C. Blackburn	16,015
Socialist	Allan L. Benson	Louis Middleton	16,013
Socialist	Allan L. Benson	John Miller	16,013
Socialist	Allan L. Benson	Daniel Rawley	16,008
Socialist	Allan L. Benson	Robert Calhoun	16,006
Socialist	Allan L. Benson	Guy L. North	16,004
Socialist	Allan L. Benson	Arthur Parent	16,004
Socialist	Allan L. Benson	John Kuskila	16,003
Socialist	Allan L. Benson	Otis M. Southworth	16,003
Socialist	Allan L. Benson	William Blanchard	16,002
Socialist	Allan L. Benson	William Aukerman	15,999
Socialist	Allan L. Benson	Albert Suppus	15,978
Socialist	Allan L. Benson	W. C. Roxburgh	15,814
Prohibition	Frank Hanly	Marshall H. Pettit	8,139
Prohibition	Frank Hanly	Judge Barnum	8,110
Prohibition	Frank Hanly	Robert King	8,108
Prohibition	Frank Hanly	Samuel Dickie	8,101
Prohibition	Frank Hanly	Lemuel B. Bissell	8,096
Prohibition	Frank Hanly	Guy W. Hawley	8,096
Prohibition	Frank Hanly	Thomas R. Davis	8,089
Prohibition	Frank Hanly	Charles R. Evans	8,089
Prohibition	Frank Hanly	Wirt McLean	8,088
Prohibition	Frank Hanly	Charles W. Obee	8,088
Prohibition	Frank Hanly	Edwin W. Orson	8,087
Prohibition	Frank Hanly	Otto E. Cutler	8,084
Prohibition	Frank Hanly	Charles T. Parris	8,082
Prohibition	Frank Hanly	Burton L. Rochwood	8,076
Prohibition	Frank Hanly	George Roelofs	8,059
Socialist Labor	Arthur E. Reimer	Wendall A. Schwan	842
Socialist Labor	Arthur E. Reimer	George W. Foshag	834
Votes cast (Note: Based on highest elector on each ticket)			650,973

=== Results by county ===
The results below are those for the highest elector on each ticket. The results listed in the 1917-1918 Michigan Manual are a "general average" for each ticket and thus not the "true" results.

County	Charles Evans Hughes Republican		Woodrow Wilson Democratic		Allan L. Benson Socialist		Frank Hanly Prohibition		Arthur Reimer Socialist Labor		Margin		Total votes cast
County	#	%	#	%	#	%	#	%	#	%	#	%	Total votes cast
Alcona	575	52.32%	471	42.86%	40	3.64%	10	0.91%	3	0.27%	104	9.46%	1,099
Alger	689	48.15%	658	45.98%	54	3.77%	24	1.68%	6	0.42%	31	2.17%	1,431
Allegan	4,808	54.54%	3,638	41.27%	224	2.54%	136	1.54%	10	0.11%	1,170	13.27%	8,816
Alpena	2,037	58.05%	1,397	39.81%	61	1.74%	12	0.34%	2	0.06%	640	18.24%	3,509
Antrim	1,340	53.73%	943	37.81%	151	6.05%	51	2.04%	9	0.36%	397	15.92%	2,494
Arenac	907	46.66%	943	48.51%	59	3.03%	31	1.59%	4	0.21%	-36	-1.85%	1,944
Baraga	753	57.22%	465	35.33%	88	6.69%	8	0.61%	2	0.15%	288	21.88%	1,316
Barry	3,165	53.67%	2,512	42.60%	111	1.88%	102	1.73%	7	0.12%	653	11.07%	5,897
Bay	6,708	51.09%	5,996	45.67%	317	2.41%	66	0.50%	43	0.33%	712	5.42%	13,130
Benzie	902	46.86%	786	40.83%	159	8.26%	64	3.32%	14	0.73%	116	6.03%	1,925
Berrien	7,524	53.66%	6,069	43.29%	232	1.65%	132	0.94%	64	0.46%	1,455	10.38%	14,021
Branch	3,101	48.73%	3,068	48.22%	93	1.46%	98	1.54%	3	0.05%	33	0.52%	6,363
Calhoun	6,491	41.98%	8,075	52.23%	651	4.21%	195	1.26%	49	0.32%	-1,584	-10.25%	15,461
Cass	2,523	46.67%	2,674	49.46%	140	2.59%	60	1.11%	9	0.17%	-151	-2.79%	5,406
Charlevoix	1,880	54.43%	1,172	33.93%	308	8.92%	70	2.03%	24	0.69%	708	20.50%	3,454
Cheboygan	1,577	50.89%	1,407	45.40%	89	2.87%	21	0.68%	5	0.16%	170	5.49%	3,099
Chippewa	2,368	54.55%	1,774	40.87%	143	3.29%	49	1.13%	7	0.16%	594	13.68%	4,341
Clare	1,050	54.07%	781	40.22%	76	3.91%	33	1.70%	2	0.10%	269	13.85%	1,942
Clinton	3,388	60.40%	2,116	37.73%	39	0.70%	66	1.18%	0	0.00%	1,272	22.68%	5,609
Crawford	408	45.64%	462	51.68%	17	1.90%	6	0.67%	1	0.11%	-54	-6.04%	894
Delta	3,106	59.73%	1,798	34.58%	239	4.60%	41	0.79%	16	0.31%	1,308	25.15%	5,200
Dickinson	2,399	60.52%	1,303	32.87%	212	5.35%	43	1.08%	7	0.18%	1,096	27.65%	3,964
Eaton	3,813	50.67%	3,490	46.38%	109	1.45%	99	1.32%	14	0.19%	323	4.29%	7,525
Emmet	1,752	50.45%	1,381	39.76%	291	8.38%	41	1.18%	8	0.23%	371	10.68%	3,473
Genesee	9,365	48.38%	9,335	48.23%	418	2.16%	200	1.03%	39	0.20%	30	0.15%	19,357
Gladwin	942	52.28%	755	41.90%	62	3.44%	37	2.05%	6	0.33%	187	10.38%	1,802
Gogebic	2,222	55.04%	1,551	38.42%	124	3.07%	130	3.22%	10	0.25%	671	16.62%	4,037
Grand Traverse	1,958	45.87%	1,891	44.30%	330	7.73%	63	1.48%	27	0.63%	67	1.57%	4,269
Gratiot	3,437	51.93%	2,991	45.19%	60	0.91%	121	1.83%	9	0.14%	446	6.74%	6,618
Hillsdale	3,480	48.66%	3,440	48.11%	44	0.62%	182	2.55%	5	0.07%	40	0.56%	7,151
Houghton	8,030	59.94%	4,677	34.91%	276	2.06%	398	2.97%	15	0.11%	3,353	25.03%	13,396
Huron	4,762	70.62%	1,845	27.36%	75	1.11%	59	0.87%	2	0.03%	2,917	43.26%	6,743
Ingham	7,857	47.59%	7,731	46.83%	626	3.79%	236	1.43%	60	0.36%	126	0.76%	16,510
Ionia	3,953	48.15%	3,946	48.07%	140	1.71%	161	1.96%	9	0.11%	7	0.09%	8,209
Iosco	991	55.80%	740	41.67%	24	1.35%	20	1.13%	1	0.06%	251	14.13%	1,776
Iron	2,159	67.43%	890	27.80%	127	3.97%	21	0.66%	5	0.16%	1,269	39.63%	3,202
Isabella	2,703	53.75%	2,161	42.97%	73	1.45%	87	1.73%	5	0.10%	542	10.78%	5,029
Jackson	6,951	44.73%	8,120	52.26%	231	1.49%	223	1.44%	14	0.09%	-1,169	-7.52%	15,539
Kalamazoo	5,951	41.88%	7,194	50.63%	797	5.61%	245	1.72%	22	0.15%	-1,243	-8.75%	14,209
Kalkaska	723	57.20%	433	34.26%	81	6.41%	21	1.66%	6	0.47%	290	22.94%	1,264
Kent	16,126	42.38%	20,467	53.79%	950	2.50%	507	1.33%	3	0.01%	-4,341	-11.41%	38,053
Keweenaw	862	77.80%	197	17.78%	21	1.90%	26	2.35%	2	0.18%	665	60.02%	1,108
Lake	589	60.22%	355	36.30%	29	2.97%	5	0.51%	0	0.00%	234	23.93%	978
Lapeer	3,346	61.52%	1,959	36.02%	25	0.46%	100	1.84%	9	0.17%	1,387	25.50%	5,439
Leelanau	999	53.59%	785	42.11%	56	3.00%	22	1.18%	2	0.11%	214	11.48%	1,864
Lenawee	6,268	51.97%	5,544	45.97%	79	0.66%	161	1.33%	9	0.07%	724	6.00%	12,061
Livingston	2,470	50.90%	2,305	47.50%	9	0.19%	65	1.34%	4	0.08%	165	3.40%	4,853
Luce	528	64.63%	266	32.56%	6	0.73%	17	2.08%	0	0.00%	262	32.07%	817
Mackinac	1,091	53.38%	916	44.81%	31	1.52%	6	0.29%	0	0.00%	175	8.56%	2,044
Macomb	4,564	58.13%	3,136	39.94%	47	0.60%	95	1.21%	9	0.11%	1,428	18.19%	7,851
Manistee	2,362	49.86%	2,207	46.59%	107	2.26%	53	1.12%	8	0.17%	155	3.27%	4,737
Marquette	5,286	63.04%	2,653	31.64%	331	3.95%	101	1.20%	14	0.17%	2,633	31.40%	8,385
Mason	2,203	52.63%	1,733	41.40%	178	4.25%	72	1.72%	0	0.00%	470	11.23%	4,186
Mecosta	2,464	56.93%	1,515	35.00%	257	5.94%	85	1.96%	7	0.16%	949	21.93%	4,328
Menominee	2,706	57.15%	1,863	39.35%	118	2.49%	46	0.97%	2	0.04%	843	17.80%	4,735
Midland	2,112	57.52%	1,479	40.28%	60	1.63%	15	0.41%	6	0.16%	633	17.24%	3,672
Missaukee	1,155	53.95%	933	43.58%	26	1.21%	25	1.17%	2	0.09%	222	10.37%	2,141
Monroe	3,789	46.51%	4,227	51.89%	47	0.58%	82	1.01%	1	0.01%	-438	-5.38%	8,146
Montcalm	3,906	55.64%	2,856	40.68%	110	1.57%	138	1.97%	10	0.14%	1,050	14.96%	7,020
Montmorency	394	53.10%	286	38.54%	54	7.28%	7	0.94%	1	0.13%	108	14.56%	742
Muskegon	5,715	51.98%	4,524	41.15%	601	5.47%	127	1.16%	27	0.25%	1,191	10.83%	10,994
Newaygo	2,419	57.90%	1,653	39.56%	0	0.00%	90	2.15%	16	0.38%	766	18.33%	4,178
Oakland	7,732	51.86%	6,654	44.63%	294	1.97%	204	1.37%	25	0.17%	1,078	7.23%	14,909
Oceana	1,957	53.88%	1,409	38.79%	171	4.71%	84	2.31%	11	0.30%	548	15.09%	3,632
Ogemaw	877	50.87%	754	43.74%	42	2.44%	50	2.90%	1	0.06%	123	7.13%	1,724
Ontonagon	1,236	53.97%	902	39.39%	123	5.37%	24	1.05%	5	0.22%	334	14.59%	2,290
Osceola	2,203	61.62%	1,306	36.53%	19	0.53%	47	1.31%	0	0.00%	897	25.09%	3,575
Oscoda	245	55.68%	185	42.05%	5	1.14%	5	1.14%	0	0.00%	60	13.64%	440
Otsego	532	48.45%	536	48.82%	9	0.82%	16	1.46%	5	0.46%	-4	-0.36%	1,098
Ottawa	5,496	55.85%	4,013	40.78%	242	2.46%	85	0.86%	5	0.05%	1,483	15.07%	9,841
Presque Isle	1,409	60.97%	827	35.79%	61	2.64%	8	0.35%	6	0.26%	582	25.18%	2,311
Roscommon	313	52.87%	248	41.89%	23	3.89%	3	0.51%	5	0.84%	65	10.98%	592
Saginaw	9,575	51.73%	8,451	45.66%	313	1.69%	143	0.77%	27	0.15%	1,124	6.07%	18,509
Sanilac	4,660	68.99%	1,934	28.63%	38	0.56%	120	1.78%	3	0.04%	2,726	40.36%	6,755
Schoolcraft	997	58.96%	632	37.37%	45	2.66%	15	0.89%	2	0.12%	365	21.58%	1,691
Shiawassee	3,945	51.24%	3,333	43.29%	179	2.32%	233	3.03%	9	0.12%	612	7.95%	7,699
St. Clair	6,542	57.30%	4,636	40.60%	131	1.15%	101	0.88%	8	0.07%	1,906	16.69%	11,418
St. Joseph	3,132	44.94%	3,577	51.32%	191	2.74%	61	0.88%	9	0.13%	-445	-6.38%	6,970
Tuscola	4,466	63.33%	2,355	33.39%	53	0.75%	171	2.42%	7	0.10%	2,111	29.93%	7,052
Van Buren	4,318	55.22%	3,256	41.64%	167	2.14%	66	0.84%	13	0.17%	1,062	13.58%	7,820
Washtenaw	6,505	54.02%	5,279	43.84%	136	1.13%	106	0.88%	16	0.13%	1,226	10.18%	12,042
Wayne	70,520	51.62%	61,860	45.28%	3,236	2.37%	994	0.73%	0	0.00%	8,660	6.34%	136,610
Wexford	2,335	55.01%	1,690	39.81%	115	2.71%	96	2.26%	9	0.21%	645	15.19%	4,245
Totals	339,097	52.09%	286,775	44.05%	16,120 (Note: The county results add up to 16,126)	2.48%	8,139	1.25%	842	0.13%	52,322	8.04%	650,973

==== Counties that flipped from Progressive to Republican ====
- Alcona
- Alger
- Allegan
- Alpena
- Antrim
- Baraga
- Barry
- Bay
- Benzie
- Berrien
- Cheboygan
- Chippewa
- Clare
- Clinton
- Delta
- Emmet
- Genesee
- Gogebic
- Grand Traverse
- Gratiot
- Hillsdale
- Houghton
- Huron
- Ingham
- Iosco
- Isabella
- Kalkaska
- Keweenaw
- Lake
- Lapeer
- Leelanau
- Luce
- Marquette
- Mason
- Mecosta
- Menominee
- Midland
- Missaukee
- Montcalm
- Muskegon
- Newaygo
- Oceana
- Ogemaw
- Osceola
- Oscoda
- Ottawa
- Presque Isle
- Roscommon
- Sanilac
- Shiawassee
- St. Clair
- Tuscola
- Van Buren
- Wayne
- Wexford

==== Counties that flipped from Democratic to Republican ====
- Branch
- Eaton
- Ionia
- Lenawee
- Livingston
- Mackinac
- Macomb
- Manistee
- Saginaw
- Washtenaw

==== Counties that flipped from Progressive to Democratic ====
- Arenac
- Calhoun
- Jackson
- Kalamazoo
- Kent
- St. Joseph

==== Counties that flipped from Republican to Democratic ====
- Crawford
- Otsego

== Analysis ==
Despite Hughes’ comfortable win, incumbent President Woodrow Wilson did nonetheless achieve the best performance in Michigan by a Democrat since Grover Cleveland in 1888. Wilson improved seventeen percent on his 1912 showing when he finished third behind both Roosevelt and Taft, with most of his gains occurring in the heavily evangelical cabinet counties of the southern part of the state. Wilson was the first Democrat to ever carry Kalamazoo County. This was the last time the Republican candidate won Michigan without carrying Kent County - the home of Grand Rapids, until Donald Trump did so in 2024. This is the last time a Democrat won two terms without ever carrying the state.

== See also ==
- United States presidential elections in Michigan
