= Maple Valley Schools =

School district in Michigan

Address
- 11090 Nashville Highway Vermontville, Eaton County, Michigan, 49096; United States
- Coordinates: 42°36′42.2″N 85°03′20.4″W

District information
- Grades: PreKindergarten–12
- Established: 1963
- Superintendent: Katherine Bertolini
- Schools: 4
- Budget: $16,698,000 2022-2023 total expenditures
- NCES District ID: 2622620

Students and staff
- Students: 873 (2024-2025)
- Teachers: 56.05 (on an FTE basis) (2024-2025)
- Staff: 145.24 FTE (2024-2025)
- Student–teacher ratio: 15.58 (2024-2025)
- District mascot: Lion
- Colors: Blue and White

Other information
- Intermediate school district: Eaton Intermediate School District
- Website: mvs.k12.mi.us

Maple Valley Schools is a public school district in West Michigan. In Eaton County, it serves Vermontville and parts of the townships of Carmel, Kalamo, Chester, Sunfield and Vermontville. In Barry County, it serves Nashville and parts of the townships of Assyria, Baltimore, Castleton, Hastings, and Maple Grove.

== History ==
Nashville's old high school, also known as W. K. Kellogg School, was built in 1902 and expanded in 1936 with funding from the W.K. Kellogg Foundation.

Residents of Nashville and Vermontville were reluctant to merge their independent school districts, but by 1963, the districts had inadequate facilities and a merger would help fund improvements. The state fire marshal found the buildings to be hazardous, causing Vermontville to lose its accreditation and Nashville to be put on tentative accreditation. Voters approved the merger the fourth time it was on the ballot, and a few months later they approved a bond issue to build a new junior/senior high school.

The building program also included additions at Fuller Street and Maplewood Elementaries, tearing down the Vermontville High School, and tearing down the oldest section of Nashville High School and renovating the newer part as an upper elementary building. The new junior/senior high school was dedicated on October 10, 1965.

Nashville's old high school has been converted to apartments.

== Schools ==
Schools in Maple Valley Schools district
School	Address	Notes
Maple Valley Junior/Senior High School	11090 Nashville Highway, Vermontville	Grades 7-12. Built 1965.
Fuller Street Elementary	251 Fuller Street, Nashville	Grades PreK-2. Built 1951.
Maplewood Elementary	170 Seminary Street, Vermontville	Grades 3-6. Built 1952.
Pathways High School	11090 Nashville Highway, Vermontville	Alternative high school within Maple Valley Junior/Senior High School.
