= 1924 United States presidential election in Michigan =

Presidential Election in Michigan, 1924

- November 4, 1924

All 15 Michigan votes to the Electoral College

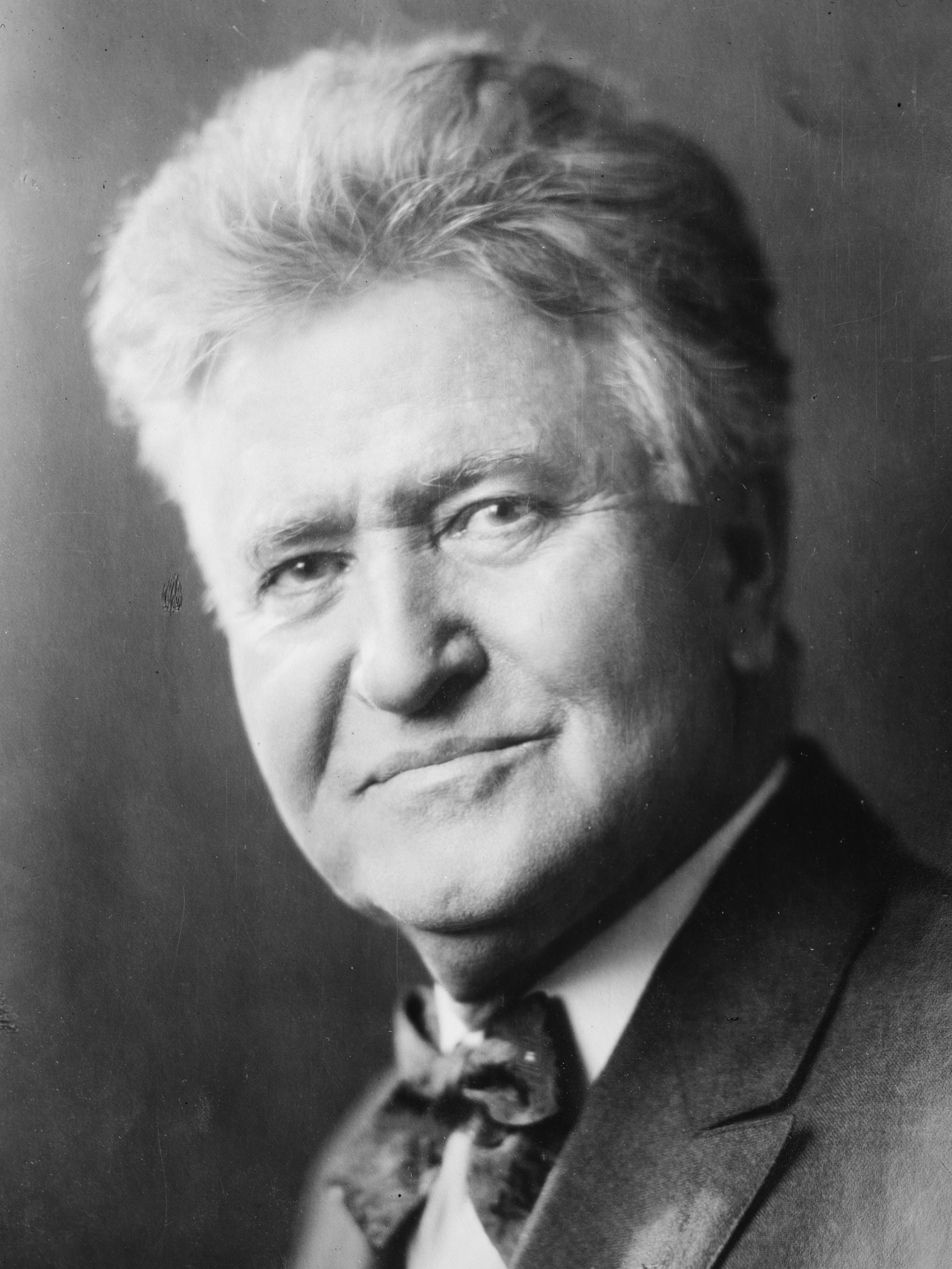
Nominee	Calvin Coolidge	John W. Davis	Robert M. La Follette
Party	Republican	Democratic	Progressive
Home state	Massachusetts	West Virginia	Wisconsin
Running mate	Charles G. Dawes	Charles W. Bryan	Burton K. Wheeler
Electoral vote	15	0	0
Popular vote	874,631	152,359	122,014
Percentage	75.37%	13.13%	10.51%
County results
Coolidge
40–50%
50–60%
60–70%
70–80%
80–90%
90–100%
President before election
Calvin Coolidge
Republican
Elected President
Calvin Coolidge
Republican

The 1924 United States presidential election in Michigan took place on November 4, 1924, as part of the 1924 United States presidential election. Voters chose fifteen representatives, or electors, to the Electoral College, who voted for president and vice president.

Ever since the Panic of 1893 and the Populist movement, Michigan had been rigidly one-party polity dominated by the Republican Party. In the 1894 elections, the Democratic Party lost all but one seat in the Michigan legislature, and over the four ensuing decades the party would never make major gains there. The dominance of the culture of the Lower Peninsula by anti-slavery Yankees would be augmented by the turn of formerly Democratic-leaning German Catholics away from that party as a result of the remodelled party's agrarian and free silver sympathies, which became rigidly opposed by both the upper class and workers who followed them, while the Populist movement eliminated Democratic ties with the business and commerce of Michigan and other Northern states. By the 1920s, the only significant financial backer of the state Democratic Party was billionaire William Comstock.

Unlike the other states of the Upper Midwest, the Yankee influence on the culture of the Lower Peninsula was so strong that left-wing third parties did not provide significant opposition to the Republicans, nor was there more than a moderate degree of coordinated factionalism within the hegemonic Michigan Republican Party.

By taking a substantial proportion of the 1912 “Bull Moose” vote, incumbent president Woodrow Wilson would manage the best performance in Michigan by a Democrat since Grover Cleveland in 1888, but 1918 saw a major reaction against Wilson throughout the Midwest, due to supposed preferential treatment of Southern farmers. Republicans would hold every seat in the State Senate for over a decade after the fall election, as they had between 1895 and 1897 and between 1905 and 1911, and every seat in both houses of the state legislature between 1921 and 1923.

The only campaigning done in the state by any of the three major candidates – Republican Party incumbent Calvin Coolidge of Massachusetts, Democratic nominee John W. Davis of West Virginia and third-party candidate Robert M. La Follette of the Progressive Party — was a tour by conservative Southern Democrat Davis in September, during which he campaigned to eliminate the income tax burden of the poorer classes.

== Results ==
General Election Results
Party	Pledged to	Elector	Votes
Republican	Calvin Coolidge	Stella B. Roben	874,631
Republican	Calvin Coolidge	John A. Weeks	872,331
Republican	Calvin Coolidge	James W. Ames	871,451
Republican	Calvin Coolidge	Thornton Dixon	871,307
Republican	Calvin Coolidge	Mary W. Miller	871,296
Republican	Calvin Coolidge	Francis J. Shields	871,294
Republican	Calvin Coolidge	Phila L. Hamilton	871,258
Republican	Calvin Coolidge	George S. Lovelace	871,258
Republican	Calvin Coolidge	James H. Kinnane	870,994
Republican	Calvin Coolidge	Dallas Boudeman	870,979
Republican	Calvin Coolidge	John A. Whitman	870,876
Republican	Calvin Coolidge	Martha Pier Woodard	870,756
Republican	Calvin Coolidge	John L. A. Galster	870,548
Republican	Calvin Coolidge	Rudolph J. Grandt	870,417
Republican	Calvin Coolidge	Frank Scadden	870,345
Democratic	John W. Davis	Charles H. Bryan	152,359
Democratic	John W. Davis	George D. Jackson	152,238
Democratic	John W. Davis	Angus McLean	152,064
Democratic	John W. Davis	Lette Shay	152,038
Democratic	John W. Davis	Georgia E. White	152,002
Democratic	John W. Davis	John F. Finnigan	151,709
Democratic	John W. Davis	Donald M. McKenzie	151,643
Democratic	John W. Davis	James B. Balch	151,642
Democratic	John W. Davis	Kate Carlisle	151,451
Democratic	John W. Davis	George B. Stanford	151,446
Democratic	John W. Davis	John G. Rulison	151,429
Democratic	John W. Davis	Charles J. Biek	151,416
Democratic	John W. Davis	Robert E. Bunker	151,408
Democratic	John W. Davis	Henry R. Scovill	151,381
Democratic	John W. Davis	Georeg H. Anklam	151,380
Independent Progressive	Robert M. La Follette	John J. Scannell	122,014
Independent Progressive	Robert M. La Follette	Cornelius Gallagher	121,273
Independent Progressive	Robert M. La Follette	Jennie Buell	121,232
Independent Progressive	Robert M. La Follette	Claude O. Taylor	121,221
Independent Progressive	Robert M. La Follette	Minnie E. Jeffries	121,152
Independent Progressive	Robert M. La Follette	Carl V. Oberg	121,149
Independent Progressive	Robert M. La Follette	Jefferson G. Brown	121,144
Independent Progressive	Robert M. La Follette	Elizabeth D. Granzow	121,137
Independent Progressive	Robert M. La Follette	Louis E. Rowley	121,122
Independent Progressive	Robert M. La Follette	James H. Pound	121,120
Independent Progressive	Robert M. La Follette	Albert M. Todd	121,097
Independent Progressive	Robert M. La Follette	William C. Lash	121,092
Independent Progressive	Robert M. La Follette	Pauline Eisinger	121,089
Independent Progressive	Robert M. La Follette	Charles O. Gunn	121,069
Independent Progressive	Robert M. La Follette	Arnold C. Rassmussen	120,939
Prohibition	Herman P. Faris	Andrew Wood	6,085
Prohibition	Herman P. Faris	Ralph E. Hopusch	6,071
Prohibition	Herman P. Faris	Olive Johnson	5,994
Prohibition	Herman P. Faris	Edward D. Brooks	5,992
Prohibition	Herman P. Faris	Frank A. Luttenbacher	5,973
Prohibition	Herman P. Faris	Frank Nooper	5,962
Prohibition	Herman P. Faris	Wirt McClain	5,948
Prohibition	Herman P. Faris	Joseph Sewell	5,945
Prohibition	Herman P. Faris	Lula Deming	5,943
Prohibition	Herman P. Faris	Christepher Tucker	5,938
Prohibition	Herman P. Faris	Edwin Moffitt	5,931
Prohibition	Herman P. Faris	Libbie Catherman	5,913
Prohibition	Herman P. Faris	Elmer L. Wilder	5,912
Prohibition	Herman P. Faris	Harold R. Luttenbacher	5,909
Prohibition	Herman P. Faris	Charles H. Pallycott	5,889
Socialist Labor (Note: The 1925-1926 Michigan Official Directory and Legislative Manual credits these votes to William Z. Foster, Socialist Labor. This slate of electors was a Socialist Labor ticket, all sample ballots in newspapers are consistent on that front. However, Foster was not the nominee for the Socialist Labor Party in 1924. The Socialist Labor nominee was Frank T. Johns.)	Frank T. Johns	Arthur Davis	5,330
Socialist Labor	Frank T. Johns	Steve Mitchell	5,179
Socialist Labor	Frank T. Johns	Steve Marsovszki	5,139
Socialist Labor	Frank T. Johns	Thomas S. Corbet	4,921
Socialist Labor	Frank T. Johns	Joseph Kerekes	4,921
Socialist Labor	Frank T. Johns	John Fredricson	4,910
Socialist Labor	Frank T. Johns	George Hasseler	4,908
Socialist Labor	Frank T. Johns	Henry Kruse	4,899
Socialist Labor	Frank T. Johns	Paul Sidge	4,892
Socialist Labor	Frank T. Johns	Louis Kovacs	4,890
Socialist Labor	Frank T. Johns	Anton Kummel	4,885
Socialist Labor	Frank T. Johns	Charles Schepovich	4,876
Socialist Labor	Frank T. Johns	Charles Literaty	4,872
Socialist Labor	Frank T. Johns	Ignatz Fodi	4,871
Socialist Labor	Frank T. Johns	Elles Toth	4,864
Write-in		Scattering	100
Votes cast (Note: Based on highest elector on each ticket)			1,160,519

=== Results by county ===
County	Calvin Coolidge Republican		John W. Davis Democratic		Robert M. La Follette Progressive		Herman P. Faris Prohibition		Frank T. Johns Socialist Labor		Margin		Total votes cast
County	#	%	#	%	#	%	#	%	#	%	#	%	Total votes cast
Alcona	1,027	72.32%	184	12.96%	179	12.61%	21	1.48%	9	0.63%	843	59.37%	1,420
Alger	1,623	66.30%	228	9.31%	505	20.63%	38	1.55%	46	1.88%	1,118 (Note: In this county where La Follette ran second ahead of Davis, margin given is Coolidge vote minus La Follette vote, and percentage margin Collidge percentage minus La Follette percentage.)	45.67%	2,448 (Note: Includes 8 Scattering votes)
Allegan	9,417	79.31%	1,562	13.16%	795	6.70%	68	0.57%	30	0.25%	7,855	66.16%	11,873 (Note: Includes 1 Scattering vote)
Alpena	4,628	75.78%	948	15.52%	488	7.99%	21	0.34%	22	0.36%	3,680	60.26%	6,107
Antrim	2,246	76.79%	371	12.68%	270	9.23%	23	0.79%	15	0.51%	1,875	64.10%	2,925
Arenac	1,767	67.57%	575	21.99%	254	9.71%	14	0.54%	5	0.19%	1,192	45.58%	2,615
Baraga	1,714	71.71%	208	8.58%	391	16.13%	36	1.49%	37	1.53%	1,323	55.58%	2,424 (Note: Includes 38 Scattering votes)
Barry	5,656	70.72%	2,046	25.58%	242	3.03%	44	0.55%	10	0.13%	3,610	45.14%	7,998
Bay	14,861	64.75%	5,881	25.62%	1,991	8.68%	142	0.62%	76	0.33%	8,980	39.13%	22,951
Benzie	1,922	73.84%	198	7.61%	419	16.10%	44	1.69%	20	0.77%	1,503	57.74%	2,603
Berrien	15,612	63.73%	4,445	18.15%	4,183	17.08%	158	0.64%	99	0.40%	11,167	45.59%	24,497
Branch	6,016	64.67%	2,253	24.22%	943	10.14%	69	0.74%	21	0.23%	3,763	40.45%	9,302
Calhoun	18,165	71.91%	4,020	15.91%	2,782	11.01%	170	0.67%	125	0.49%	14,145	55.99%	25,262
Cass	4,545	59.93%	2,328	30.70%	645	8.50%	43	0.57%	23	0.30%	2,217	29.23%	7,584
Charlevoix	3,346	79.65%	406	9.66%	387	9.21%	37	0.88%	25	0.60%	2,940	69.98%	4,201
Cheboygan	2,683	64.16%	994	23.77%	441	10.55%	45	1.08%	19	0.45%	1,689	40.39%	4,182
Chippewa	5,443	77.44%	516	7.34%	997	14.18%	36	0.51%	37	0.53%	4,446	63.25%	7,029
Clare	1,920	77.67%	358	14.48%	157	6.35%	19	0.77%	18	0.73%	1,562	63.19%	2,472
Clinton	6,637	76.81%	1,359	15.73%	596	6.90%	38	0.44%	11	0.13%	5,278	61.08%	8,641
Crawford	840	72.92%	163	14.15%	137	11.89%	7	0.61%	5	0.43%	677	58.77%	1,152
Delta	4,761	49.83%	463	4.85%	4,204	44.00%	48	0.50%	78	0.82%	557	5.83%	9,554
Dickinson	4,538	68.66%	400	6.05%	1,495	22.62%	80	1.21%	96	1.45%	3,043	46.04%	6,609
Eaton	8,232	73.66%	2,462	22.03%	394	3.53%	55	0.49%	32	0.29%	5,770	51.63%	11,175
Emmet	3,020	69.23%	773	17.72%	501	11.49%	35	0.80%	33	0.76%	2,247	51.51%	4,362
Genesee	34,264	83.82%	4,225	10.34%	2,124	5.20%	125	0.31%	140	0.34%	30,039	73.48%	40,878
Gladwin	1,908	78.36%	255	10.47%	242	9.94%	23	0.94%	7	0.29%	1,653	67.89%	2,435
Gogebic	5,128	66.54%	487	6.32%	1,781	23.11%	168	2.18%	143	1.86%	3,347	43.43%	7,707
Grand Traverse	4,011	74.86%	558	10.41%	709	13.23%	54	1.01%	26	0.49%	3,302	61.63%	5,358
Gratiot	6,720	76.09%	1,839	20.82%	200	2.26%	53	0.60%	20	0.23%	4,881	55.26%	8,832
Hillsdale	6,556	68.45%	1,980	20.67%	947	9.89%	67	0.70%	28	0.29%	4,576	47.78%	9,578
Houghton	13,833	83.02%	1,045	6.27%	1,579	9.48%	83	0.50%	122	0.73%	12,254	73.54%	16,662
Huron	8,843	81.14%	988	9.07%	983	9.02%	60	0.55%	24	0.22%	7,855	72.08%	10,898
Ingham	28,005	81.15%	4,814	13.95%	1,488	4.31%	146	0.42%	52	0.15%	23,191	67.20%	34,511 (Note: Includes 6 Scattering votes)
Ionia	9,502	73.21%	2,821	21.74%	559	4.31%	79	0.61%	18	0.14%	6,681	51.48%	12,979
Iosco	1,713	71.43%	304	12.68%	329	13.72%	32	1.33%	20	0.83%	1,384	57.71%	2,398
Iron	2,802	65.06%	247	5.73%	1,143	26.54%	60	1.39%	55	1.28%	1,659	38.52%	4,307
Isabella	5,245	77.08%	1,208	17.75%	285	4.19%	52	0.76%	15	0.22%	4,037	59.32%	6,805
Jackson	19,640	69.18%	5,639	19.86%	2,880	10.14%	141	0.50%	90	0.32%	14,001	49.32%	28,390
Kalamazoo	18,451	75.31%	3,587	14.64%	2,283	9.32%	97	0.40%	82	0.33%	14,864	60.67%	24,500
Kalkaska	966	70.46%	205	14.95%	177	12.91%	18	1.31%	5	0.36%	761	55.51%	1,371
Kent	45,207	76.61%	7,982	13.53%	5,356	9.08%	260	0.44%	203	0.34%	37,225	63.08%	59,008
Keweenaw	1,421	91.15%	50	3.21%	67	4.30%	6	0.38%	15	0.96%	1,354	86.85%	1,559
Lake	1,069	68.79%	313	20.14%	160	10.30%	4	0.26%	8	0.51%	756	48.65%	1,554
Lapeer	6,297	83.65%	929	12.34%	248	3.29%	40	0.53%	14	0.19%	5,368	71.31%	7,528
Leelanau	1,792	75.36%	301	12.66%	249	10.47%	23	0.97%	13	0.55%	1,491	62.70%	2,378
Lenawee	13,358	72.65%	3,950	21.48%	958	5.21%	82	0.45%	40	0.22%	9,408	51.16%	18,388
Livingston	4,886	67.37%	2,037	28.09%	274	3.78%	40	0.55%	15	0.21%	2,849	39.29%	7,252
Luce	850	80.65%	112	10.63%	83	7.87%	9	0.85%	0	0.00%	738	70.02%	1,054
Mackinac	1,606	51.62%	998	32.08%	481	15.46%	12	0.39%	14	0.45%	608	19.54%	3,111
Macomb	11,147	69.96%	3,191	20.03%	1,506	9.45%	54	0.34%	35	0.22%	7,956	49.93%	15,933
Manistee	3,701	58.09%	1,314	20.62%	1,294	20.31%	43	0.67%	19	0.30%	2,387	37.47%	6,371
Marquette	9,771	70.70%	845	6.11%	2,984	21.59%	121	0.88%	99	0.72%	6,787	49.11%	13,820
Mason	3,567	67.18%	815	15.35%	791	14.90%	63	1.19%	74	1.39%	2,752	51.83%	5,310
Mecosta	3,884	76.96%	794	15.73%	304	6.02%	33	0.65%	32	0.63%	3,090	61.22%	5,047
Menominee	4,142	53.35%	1,055	13.59%	2,459	31.67%	48	0.62%	60	0.77%	1,683	21.68%	7,764
Midland	4,004	79.08%	625	12.34%	358	7.07%	64	1.26%	12	0.24%	3,379	66.74%	5,063
Missaukee	1,723	85.09%	208	10.27%	79	3.90%	13	0.64%	2	0.10%	1,515	74.81%	2,025
Monroe	8,940	58.12%	4,981	32.38%	1,343	8.73%	73	0.47%	46	0.30%	3,959	25.74%	15,383
Montcalm	6,942	78.97%	1,396	15.88%	349	3.97%	78	0.89%	26	0.30%	5,546	63.09%	8,791
Montmorency	748	63.93%	140	11.97%	264	22.56%	14	1.20%	4	0.34%	484	41.37%	1,170
Muskegon	14,422	79.22%	1,462	8.03%	2,188	12.02%	68	0.37%	66	0.36%	12,234	67.20%	18,206
Newaygo	4,243	79.22%	720	13.44%	333	6.22%	48	0.90%	12	0.22%	3,523	65.78%	5,356
Oakland	28,603	81.27%	4,105	11.66%	2,201	6.25%	162	0.46%	125	0.36%	24,498	69.60%	35,196
Oceana	3,335	74.79%	650	14.58%	380	8.52%	50	1.12%	35	0.78%	2,685	60.22%	4,459 (Note: Includes 9 Scattering votes)
Ogemaw	1,714	79.32%	258	11.94%	156	7.22%	19	0.88%	14	0.65%	1,456	67.38%	2,161
Ontonagon	2,249	70.90%	417	13.15%	399	12.58%	23	0.73%	61	1.92%	1,832	57.76%	3,172 (Note: Includes 23 Scattering votes)
Osceola	3,050	77.79%	566	14.44%	256	6.53%	40	1.02%	9	0.23%	2,484	63.35%	3,921
Oscoda	389	82.07%	52	10.97%	30	6.33%	0	0.00%	2	0.42%	337	71.10%	474
Otsego	1,144	73.81%	249	16.06%	143	9.23%	8	0.52%	6	0.39%	895	57.74%	1,550
Ottawa	11,688	78.55%	1,871	12.57%	1,220	8.20%	54	0.36%	47	0.32%	9,817	65.97%	14,880
Presque Isle	2,315	67.24%	431	12.52%	645	18.73%	27	0.78%	14	0.41%	1,670	48.51%	3,443 (Note: Includes 11 Scattering votes)
Roscommon	484	69.64%	99	14.24%	101	14.53%	6	0.86%	5	0.72%	383	55.11%	695
Saginaw	23,618	67.99%	6,206	17.87%	4,649	13.38%	162	0.47%	103	0.30%	17,412	50.12%	34,738
Sanilac	7,767	84.53%	983	10.70%	366	3.98%	50	0.54%	22	0.24%	6,784	73.84%	9,188
Schoolcraft	1,515	61.34%	190	7.69%	720	29.15%	24	0.97%	21	0.85%	795	32.19%	2,470
Shiawassee	8,987	72.99%	1,738	14.12%	1,366	11.09%	144	1.17%	78	0.63%	7,249	58.87%	12,313
St. Clair	17,435	76.54%	3,600	15.80%	1,635	7.18%	68	0.30%	42	0.18%	13,835	60.73%	22,780
St. Joseph	6,633	65.41%	2,649	26.12%	747	7.37%	52	0.51%	56	0.55%	3,984	39.29%	10,140 (Note: Includes 3 Scattering votes)
Tuscola	7,490	80.37%	1,076	11.55%	653	7.01%	91	0.98%	9	0.10%	6,414	68.83%	9,319
Van Buren	7,384	71.55%	1,646	15.95%	1,170	11.34%	72	0.70%	48	0.47%	5,738	55.60%	10,320
Washtenaw	14,326	72.24%	3,603	18.17%	1,728	8.71%	93	0.47%	80	0.40%	10,723	54.07%	19,830
Wayne	268,653	80.11%	23,817	7.10%	39,773	11.86%	1,121	0.33%	1,972	0.59%	228,880	68.25%	335,336
Wexford	3,926	77.47%	592	11.68%	443	8.74%	74	1.46%	33	0.65%	3,334	65.79%	5,068
Totals	874,631	75.37%	152,359	13.13%	122,014	10.51%	6,085	0.52%	5,330	0.46%	722,272	62.24%	1,160,519

== Analysis ==
The first poll taken showed it clearly that Coolidge would carry Michigan by a huge margin, although there was substantial debate as to whom the opposition vote would go — early polls had La Follette receiving twice as many votes as Davis, but Democratic spokesmen worried that the state's few Democrats would desert to Coolidge said Davis would out-poll the Wisconsin Senator. Ultimately, Davis did out-poll the Wisconsin Senator, whose figures of around 20 percent in October would fall to only 10.51 percent of the vote on election day, whilst Coolidge carried Michigan with a percentage even higher than originally predicted and which surpassed Warren G. Harding’s record performance from 1920.

Coolidge carried Michigan with 75.37 percent of the popular vote. This remains the best performance in a presidential election in Michigan as of the 2024 election, and Coolidge emulated Theodore Roosevelt in 1904 and William Howard Taft in 1908 by carrying every county in the state. Michigan was to be Coolidge's second strongest state in the 1924 election in terms of popular vote percentage after his birth state of Vermont.

Democrat Davis gathered only 13.13 percent of the vote and did not pass one-third in any of Michigan's eighty-three counties, whilst La Follette, who carried his neighbouring home state of Wisconsin and received over thirty percent in all other states of the Upper Midwest, received limited support in Michigan because it was less German and more Yankee and Polish than any other Midwestern state. La Follette's best performance was in the heavily Finnish and anti-clerical Upper Peninsula, where he received forty-four percent in Delta County and over twenty percent in seven other counties in the western Upper Peninsula. However, in the more populous Lower Peninsula, La Follette exceeded his national vote share of 16.62 percent only in four of sixty-eight counties, (Note: These were Presque Isle, Manistee, Montmorency, and Berrien Counties) and consequently the Wisconsin Senator won only 10.51 percent of Michigan's total vote, making it his third-weakest state in the Midwest after heavily Southern-leaning Indiana and Missouri. As in 1920, the Republican presidential landslide was accompanied by a clean sweep of every seat in both houses of the State legislature.

== See also ==
- United States presidential elections in Michigan
