= Potterville, Michigan =

- City
- Seal

- Location of Potterville, Michigan
- Coordinates: 42°37′48″N 84°44′36″W
- Country: United States
- State: Michigan
- County: Eaton
- Village: 1881
- City: 1962

Government
  - Type: Mayor-council
  - Mayor: Jennifer Lenneman

Area
  - Total: 1.88 sq mi (4.87 km^{2})
  - Land: 1.75 sq mi (4.52 km^{2})
  - Water: 0.14 sq mi (0.35 km^{2})
- Elevation: 902 ft (275 m)

Population (2020)
  - Total: 3,055
  - Density: 1,749.7/sq mi (675.57/km^{2})
- Time zone: UTC-5 (Eastern (EST))
  - Summer (DST): UTC-4 (EDT)
- ZIP code: 48876
- Area code: 517
- FIPS code: 26-66100
- GNIS feature ID: 1626939
- Website: https://pottervillemi.org/

Potterville is a city in Eaton County in the U.S. state of Michigan. The population was 3,055 at the 2020 census.

== History ==
=== Potter Family ===
Potterville is named for the family of Linus Potter (b. 1798), who settled in the area in November of 1845. He lived on a homestead there with his wife Diana until 1846, when he died suddenly of "over laboring in his harvest field, and drinking too freely of cold water." He was buried on his own farm, on what is now the lot on the southwest corner of Main Street and Hartel Road, though later his body was moved to a plot in the Benton Township Cemetery. His wife and seven children (George, Maria "Louisa", Theodore Edgar, Charles, Sarah, John and James) stayed in Potterville after his death.

While he resided in the county, Linus was elected Justice of the Peace of two townships in 1845, and Supervisor of Benton Township in 1846. He was considered one of the "most useful and enterprising" early citizens of Eaton County.

Prior to their move to Eaton County, Linus and his wife Diana had resided Cayuga County, New York. In 1830, they traveled to Michigan by way of the Erie Canal, to Buffalo and then by way of Lake Erie steamboat to Detroit. From there, Linus and Diana walked to Plymouth, Michigan, a journey of about thirty miles, before walking on to Saline. The pair carried their eldest son, three-year-old George, and their eldest daughter, Louisa.

Following Linus Potter's death, Diana Potter continued to raise her children and keep her homestead. In a letter to a grandson written when she was eighty years of age, she said, "I kept my family with me until they became men and women, and neither of my five boys, to my knowledge, have ever used liquor or tobacco, and all have good homes and families."

==== Potter Children ====
George Potter was a land owner in Potterville before 21 years of age. In 1856 he became the Sheriff of Eaton County and later was elected to a seat in the State Senate.

Louisa was the first schoolteacher in the area, teaching seven pupils in her father's new barn in 1846.

Theodore Edgar worked with a team of surveyors to survey a road from Battle Creek to Lansing (though he joined the team beginning in Potterville) and later helped to build a road through Potterville.

James worked with his brother George to acquire land and build many local businesses, and he was also responsible in part for getting the railroad routed through Potterville. Later he and his brother moved their factories to Lansing and were influential in the growth of that community. James was the donor of the land for Potter Park in Lansing.

=== Incorporation ===
Potterville incorporated as a village within Benton Township in 1881, and as a city in 1962 withdrawing it completely from the township.

=== Disasters ===
On July 6, 1994, a lightning strike at Fox Park injured 22 beach-goers. The lightning struck the water and "walked up the beach."

A rare Michigan earthquake on September 2, 1994, had its epicenter just east of the city. The shock had a body wave magnitude of 3.5 and a maximum Mercalli intensity of V (Moderate). It could be felt through most of Mid-Michigan.

The city experienced a massive train derailment of 35 Canadian National railroad cars over Memorial Day weekend 2002. Due to leaking propane from the cars, the entire city was evacuated. The cause of the derailment was found to have been a faulty rail.

== Geography ==
According to the United States Census Bureau, the city has a total area of 1.82 square miles (4.71 km^{2}), of which 1.68 square miles (4.35 km^{2}) is land and 0.14 square miles (0.36 km^{2}) is water.

== Demographics ==
Historical population
Census	Pop.	Note	%±
1880	471		—
1890	505		7.2%
1900	495		−2.0%
1910	430		−13.1%
1920	330		−23.3%
1930	492		49.1%
1940	547		11.2%
1950	624		14.1%
1960	1,028		64.7%
1970	1,280		24.5%
1980	1,502		17.3%
1990	1,523		1.4%
2000	2,168		42.4%
2010	2,617		20.7%
2020	3,055		16.7%
U.S. Decennial Census

=== 2020 census ===
As of the 2020 census, Potterville had a population of 3,055. The median age was 33.7 years. 27.0% of residents were under the age of 18 and 10.8% of residents were 65 years of age or older. For every 100 females there were 98.0 males, and for every 100 females age 18 and over there were 91.7 males age 18 and over.

99.5% of residents lived in urban areas, while 0.5% lived in rural areas.

There were 1,172 households in Potterville, of which 38.1% had children under the age of 18 living in them. Of all households, 44.5% were married-couple households, 18.3% were households with a male householder and no spouse or partner present, and 27.8% were households with a female householder and no spouse or partner present. About 24.1% of all households were made up of individuals and 7.6% had someone living alone who was 65 years of age or older.

There were 1,218 housing units, of which 3.8% were vacant. The homeowner vacancy rate was 1.2% and the rental vacancy rate was 6.1%.

Racial composition as of the 2020 census
Race	Number	Percent
White	2,646	86.6%
Black or African American	46	1.5%
American Indian and Alaska Native	9	0.3%
Asian	22	0.7%
Native Hawaiian and Other Pacific Islander	0	0.0%
Some other race	30	1.0%
Two or more races	302	9.9%
Hispanic or Latino (of any race)	215	7.0%

=== 2010 Census ===
As of the census of 2010, there were 2,617 people, 952 households, and 702 families residing in the city. The population density was 1,557.7 inhabitants per square mile (601.4/km^{2}). There were 1,112 housing units at an average density of 661.9 per square mile (255.6/km^{2}). The racial makeup of the city was 94.2% White, 1.3% African American, 0.6% Native American, 0.5% Asian, 0.6% from other races, and 2.6% from two or more races. Hispanic or Latino of any race were 5.7% of the population.

There were 952 households, of which 45.4% had children under the age of 18 living with them, 51.2% were married couples living together, 16.8% had a female householder with no husband present, 5.8% had a male householder with no wife present, and 26.3% were non-families. 21.6% of all households were made up of individuals, and 4.9% had someone living alone who was 65 years of age or older. The average household size was 2.75 and the average family size was 3.16.

The median age in the city was 32.4 years. 31.2% of residents were under the age of 18; 8.3% were between the ages of 18 and 24; 30% were from 25 to 44; 23.5% were from 45 to 64; and 7.1% were 65 years of age or older. The gender makeup of the city was 48.6% male and 51.4% female.

=== 2000 Census ===
As of the census of 2000, there were 2,168 people, 802 households, and 572 families residing in the city. The population density was 1,178.3 inhabitants per square mile (454.9/km^{2}). There were 892 housing units at an average density of 484.8/sq mi (187.2/km^{2}). The racial makeup of the city was 95.48% White, 0.23% African American, 0.42% Native American, 0.42% Asian, 1.48% from other races, and 1.98% from two or more races. Hispanic or Latino of any race were 4.01% of the population.

There were 802 households, out of which 44.0% had children under the age of 18 living with them, 50.4% were married couples living together, 17.3% had a female householder with no husband present, and 28.6% were non-families. 22.9% of all households were made up of individuals, and 4.9% had someone living alone who was 65 years of age or older. The average household size was 2.70 and the average family size was 3.18.

In the city, the population was spread out, with 33.7% under the age of 18, 9.0% from 18 to 24, 33.9% from 25 to 44, 18.1% from 45 to 64, and 5.3% who were 65 years of age or older. The median age was 29 years. For every 100 females, there were 92.5 males. For every 100 females age 18 and over, there were 87.5 males.

The median income for a household in the city was $42,292, and the median income for a family was $48,182. Males had a median income of $33,988 versus $26,250 for females. The per capita income for the city was $17,880. About 3.5% of families and 5.9% of the population were below the poverty line, including 5.0% of those under age 18 and 6.0% of those age 65 or over.

== Education ==
The city is served by Potterville Public Schools, whose schools are located on one campus along Main Street just east of N. Hartel Road (M-100). The district mascot is the Vikings, with school colors of maroon and gold. This campus includes an elementary, middle, and high school (including sport facilities). Also sharing this campus are the administration and preschool buildings.

== Transportation ==
Potterville is located approximately 12.6 miles (20.2 kilometers) southwest of downtown Lansing and 7 miles (11.2 kilometers) northeast of Charlotte along Lansing Road at its intersection with Hartel Road/M-100. The city is connected with interstate highway system immediately south of this intersection where M-100 interchanges with I-69. M-100 also connects Potterville to I-96 just north of Grand Ledge.

The city is serviced by Canadian National Railway (CN) along its Flint Subdivision.

== Highways ==
Highways

- I-69
- M-100

== Public safety ==
The City of Potterville Police Department provides law enforcement services to Potterville with three full-time officers, one part-time officer, and a full-time chief. Fire services are provided by the Benton Twp. Fire & EMS Department, which utilizes a combination of full-time, part-time and paid-on-call firefighters/medical personnel, which took effect on September 10, 2019, when the city decided to dissolve the Potterville City Fire Dept. due to unforeseen circumstances. The Benton Township Fire Department currently covers the city of Potterville.

== Notable people ==
- Joe Davis, current play-by-play broadcaster for Fox Sports and the Los Angeles Dodgers
