= 1904 United States presidential election in Michigan =

- November 8, 1904

All 14 Michigan votes to the Electoral College
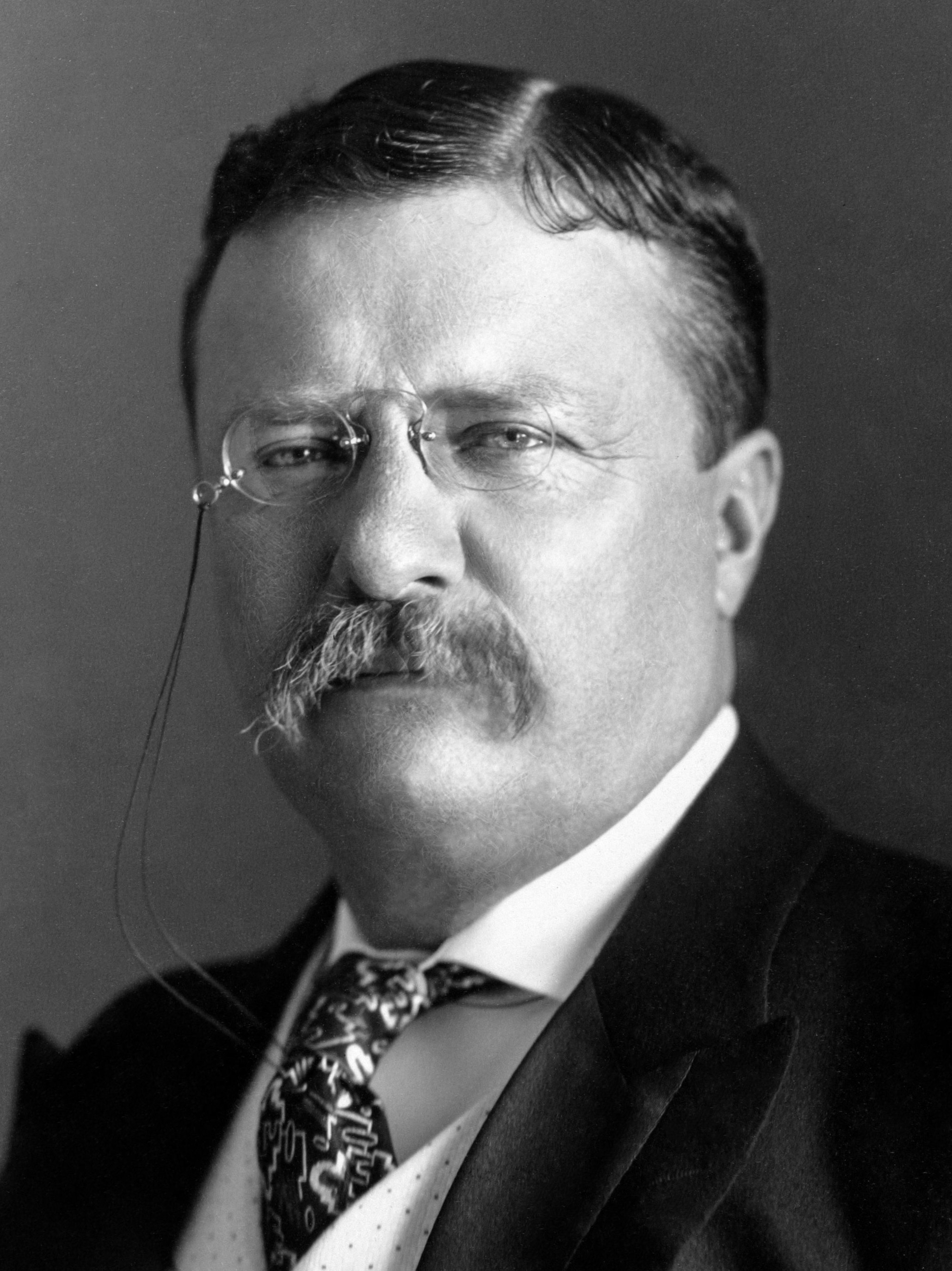

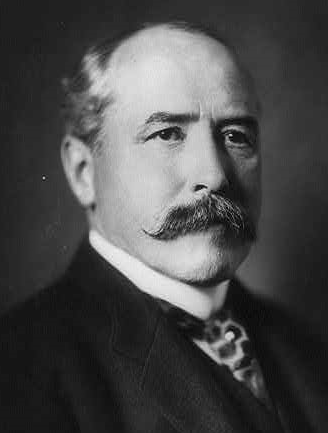
Nominee	Theodore Roosevelt	Alton B. Parker
Party	Republican	Democratic
Home state	New York	New York
Running mate	Charles W. Fairbanks	Henry G. Davis
Electoral vote	14	0
Popular vote	364,957	135,392
Percentage	69.51%	25.79%
County results
Roosevelt
50–60%
60–70%
70–80%
80–90%
90–100%
President before election
Theodore Roosevelt
Republican
Elected President
Theodore Roosevelt
Republican

The 1904 United States presidential election in Michigan took place on November 8, 1904, as part of the 1904 United States presidential election. Voters chose 14 representatives, or electors, to the Electoral College, who voted for president and vice president.

Following the Panic of 1893 and the Populist movement, Michigan would turn from a competitive Republican-leaning state into a rigidly one-party polity dominated by the Republican Party. The dominance of the culture of the Lower Peninsula by anti-slavery Yankees would be augmented by the turn of formerly Democratic-leaning German Catholics away from that party as a result of the remodelled party's agrarian and free silver sympathies, which became rigidly opposed by both the upper class and workers who followed them. The state Democratic Party was further crippled financially by the fact that the Populist movement had severed its ties with business and commerce in Michigan as in other Northern states. A brief turn of the strongly evangelical Cabinet Counties toward the Populist movement in the 1896 United States presidential election would reverse itself following the return to prosperity under President William McKinley, so that these joined in Republican hegemony until the Great Depression.

In the 1894 elections, the Democratic Party lost all but one seat in the Michigan legislature, and the party would only make minor gains there for the next third of a century. Unlike the other states of the Upper Midwest, the Yankee influence on the culture of the Lower Peninsula was so strong that left-wing third parties did not provide significant opposition to the Republicans, nor was there more than a moderate degree of coordinated factionalism within the hegemonic Michigan Republican Party.

Although Michigan's few Democrats had cast their vote for the eventual nominee Alton B. Parker, they ultimately did nothing to campaign for him during his fall campaign, as polls consistently showed that Michigan would vote overwhelmingly Republican. Incumbent Republican Theodore Roosevelt did briefly visit the state during his campaign, but did no extensive work because the state was believed so safe. Predictions of a Roosevelt margin of 200,000 were conservative as in the end he defeated Parker by over 227,000 votes.

Roosevelt became the first presidential candidate to win all 83 of Michigan's counties, and furthermore carried them all by double digits; his lowest vote share in any county was 56.95 percent in Monroe County. Parker broke forty percent only in Monroe County and thirty percent in just fourteen counties. In most of the sparsely populated Upper Peninsula, Roosevelt carried over eighty percent of the vote, and in two counties even exceeded ninety percent.

== Results ==
General Election Results
Party	Pledged to	Elector	Votes
Republican Party	Theodore Roosevelt	Phillip H. McMillan	364,957
Republican Party	Theodore Roosevelt	Homer E. Buck	361,805
Republican Party	Theodore Roosevelt	Robert B. Loomis	361,741
Republican Party	Theodore Roosevelt	Edward G. McPherson	361,722
Republican Party	Theodore Roosevelt	Whitman E. Clark	361,673
Republican Party	Theodore Roosevelt	Edgar Rexford	361,673
Republican Party	Theodore Roosevelt	Frank E. Knappeu	361,660
Republican Party	Theodore Roosevelt	William M. Smith	361,587
Republican Party	Theodore Roosevelt	John F. Wallace	361,559
Republican Party	Theodore Roosevelt	Harland B. Dudley	361,536
Republican Party	Theodore Roosevelt	Edgar B. Foss	361,526
Republican Party	Theodore Roosevelt	Albert B. Cogger	361,417
Republican Party	Theodore Roosevelt	Otto C. Davidson	361,401
Republican Party	Theodore Roosevelt	Henry M. Duffield	361,212
Democratic Party	Alton B. Parker	Thomas F. Carroll	135,392
Democratic Party	Alton B. Parker	Joseph L. Hudson	134,284
Democratic Party	Alton B. Parker	Gilbert M. Stark	134,151
Democratic Party	Alton B. Parker	Samuel Folz	134,112
Democratic Party	Alton B. Parker	Samuel W. Beakes	134,101
Democratic Party	Alton B. Parker	Peter Doran	134,085
Democratic Party	Alton B. Parker	Frank W. Hubbard	134,085
Democratic Party	Alton B. Parker	Frank H. Carroll	134,074
Democratic Party	Alton B. Parker	Horace N. Montague	134,060
Democratic Party	Alton B. Parker	Leon D. Case	134,045
Democratic Party	Alton B. Parker	Antoine E. Cartier	134,041
Democratic Party	Alton B. Parker	Charles L. Smyth	134,027
Democratic Party	Alton B. Parker	Walter F. Newberry	134,013
Democratic Party	Alton B. Parker	John Power	133,909
Prohibition Party	Silas C. Swallow	Samuel Dickie	13,441
Prohibition Party	Silas C. Swallow	Charles P. Russell	13,348
Prohibition Party	Silas C. Swallow	David S. Warner	13,328
Prohibition Party	Silas C. Swallow	Myron S. Mead	13,319
Prohibition Party	Silas C. Swallow	Frank Taft	13,318
Prohibition Party	Silas C. Swallow	Henry H. Moore	13,316
Prohibition Party	Silas C. Swallow	Daniel M. Christian	13,312
Prohibition Party	Silas C. Swallow	John F. Harper	13,312
Prohibition Party	Silas C. Swallow	Henry G. Coleman	13,311
Prohibition Party	Silas C. Swallow	Louis R. Russell	13,310
Prohibition Party	Silas C. Swallow	Gedeon Vivier	13,308
Prohibition Party	Silas C. Swallow	John M. Deakins	13,307
Prohibition Party	Silas C. Swallow	James W. Case	13,304
Prohibition Party	Silas C. Swallow	Julian S. West	13,302
Socialist Party	Eugene V. Debs	John W. Wright	9,042
Socialist Party	Eugene V. Debs	Henry E. Allen	8,952
Socialist Party	Eugene V. Debs	Albert L. Heath	8,944
Socialist Party	Eugene V. Debs	Cyrus L. Shaw	8,943
Socialist Party	Eugene V. Debs	William G. Welsh	8,942
Socialist Party	Eugene V. Debs	John Santry	8,941
Socialist Party	Eugene V. Debs	Edward L. Card	8,940
Socialist Party	Eugene V. Debs	Otis M. Southworth	8,938
Socialist Party	Eugene V. Debs	Hugh R. Jenkins	8,936
Socialist Party	Eugene V. Debs	Abraham N. Mohr	8,936
Socialist Party	Eugene V. Debs	Joseph La Barge	8,933
Socialist Party	Eugene V. Debs	Ollie Kirchen	8,931
Socialist Party	Eugene V. Debs	Joseph Boustead	8,927
Socialist Party	Eugene V. Debs	Henry A. Ramsey	8,906
People's Party	Thomas E. Watson	Henry C. Grece	1,159
People's Party	Thomas E. Watson	Daniel C. Wachs	1,157
People's Party	Thomas E. Watson	Edwin Cox	1,155
People's Party	Thomas E. Watson	Frank Emerson Powers	1,154
People's Party	Thomas E. Watson	James E. Stewart	1,153
People's Party	Thomas E. Watson	Daniel Thompson	1,153
People's Party	Thomas E. Watson	John A. Corner	1,152
People's Party	Thomas E. Watson	James M. Houghton	1,152
People's Party	Thomas E. Watson	Alexander Little	1,152
People's Party	Thomas E. Watson	Le Roy E. Lockwood	1,152
People's Party	Thomas E. Watson	Henry H. Long	1,152
People's Party	Thomas E. Watson	Albert E. Beebe	1,151
People's Party	Thomas E. Watson	John M. Harris	1,108
People's Party	Thomas E. Watson	John P. Terry	1,061
Socialist Labor Party	Charles H. Corregan	Edward Bauer	1,036
Socialist Labor Party	Charles H. Corregan	Elizabertus Smith	1,010
Votes cast (Note: Based on highest elector on each ticket)			525,027

=== Results by county ===
The results below are those for the highest elector on each ticket. The results listed in the 1905-1906 Michigan Manual are a "general average" for each ticket and thus not the "true" results.

County	Theodore Roosevelt Republican		Alton B. Parker Democratic		Silas C. Swallow Prohibition		Eugene V. Debs Socialist		Thomas E. Watson Populist		Charles H. Corregan Socialist Labor		Margin		Total votes cast
County	#	%	#	%	#	%	#	%	#	%	#	%	#	%	Total votes cast
Alcona	903	87.08%	93	8.97%	21	2.03%	20	1.93%	0	0.00%	0	0.00%	810	78.11%	1,037
Alger	1,085	81.46%	204	15.32%	10	0.75%	27	2.03%	4	0.30%	2	0.15%	881	66.14%	1,332
Allegan	5,618	73.78%	1,599	21.00%	285	3.74%	77	1.01%	31	0.41%	5	0.07%	4,019	52.78%	7,615
Alpena	2,539	69.73%	902	24.77%	31	0.85%	147	4.04%	7	0.19%	15	0.41%	1,637	44.96%	3,641
Antrim	2,632	82.98%	435	13.71%	87	2.74%	13	0.41%	5	0.16%	0	0.00%	2,197	69.26%	3,172
Arenac	1,386	68.89%	458	22.76%	93	4.62%	67	3.33%	6	0.30%	2	0.10%	928	46.12%	2,012
Baraga	565	73.19%	186	24.09%	11	1.42%	4	0.52%	2	0.26%	4	0.52%	379	49.09%	772
Barry	3,703	63.18%	1,823	31.10%	279	4.76%	40	0.68%	9	0.15%	7	0.12%	1,880	32.08%	5,861
Bay	7,627	68.27%	3,147	28.17%	245	2.19%	77	0.69%	23	0.21%	53	0.47%	4,480	40.10%	11,172
Benzie	1,591	74.14%	296	13.79%	215	10.02%	35	1.63%	5	0.23%	4	0.19%	1,295	60.34%	2,146
Berrien	7,330	62.96%	3,827	32.87%	210	1.80%	222	1.91%	31	0.27%	22	0.19%	3,503	30.09%	11,642
Branch	4,388	69.66%	1,605	25.48%	176	2.79%	59	0.94%	59	0.94%	12	0.19%	2,783	44.18%	6,299
Calhoun	7,539	64.54%	3,102	26.55%	312	2.67%	639	5.47%	35	0.30%	55	0.47%	4,437	37.98%	11,682
Cass	3,160	57.62%	1,938	35.34%	216	3.94%	140	2.55%	24	0.44%	6	0.11%	1,222	22.28%	5,484
Charlevoix	2,779	81.28%	473	13.83%	97	2.84%	59	1.73%	6	0.18%	5	0.15%	2,306	67.45%	3,419
Cheboygan	2,590	70.23%	978	26.52%	49	1.33%	50	1.36%	9	0.24%	12	0.33%	1,612	43.71%	3,688
Chippewa	2,928	77.77%	665	17.66%	131	3.48%	35	0.93%	5	0.13%	1	0.03%	2,263	60.11%	3,765
Clare	1,463	71.09%	517	25.12%	45	2.19%	27	1.31%	5	0.24%	1	0.05%	946	45.97%	2,058
Clinton	4,113	64.78%	2,060	32.45%	127	2.00%	32	0.50%	12	0.19%	5	0.08%	2,053	32.34%	6,349
Crawford	597	73.89%	190	23.51%	10	1.24%	8	0.99%	3	0.37%	0	0.00%	407	50.37%	808
Delta	3,363	80.09%	657	15.65%	48	1.14%	99	2.36%	10	0.24%	22	0.52%	2,706	64.44%	4,199
Dickinson	2,995	87.80%	286	8.38%	68	1.99%	44	1.29%	9	0.26%	9	0.26%	2,709	79.42%	3,411
Eaton	5,573	69.39%	2,142	26.67%	205	2.55%	63	0.78%	38	0.47%	10	0.12%	3,431	42.72%	8,031
Emmet	2,726	69.21%	944	23.97%	244	6.19%	10	0.25%	13	0.33%	2	0.05%	1,782	45.24%	3,939
Genesee	6,642	68.57%	2,306	23.81%	398	4.11%	303	3.13%	14	0.14%	24	0.25%	4,336	44.76%	9,687
Gladwin	1,101	79.49%	232	16.75%	35	2.53%	14	1.01%	1	0.07%	2	0.14%	869	62.74%	1,385
Gogebic	2,122	78.01%	415	15.26%	115	4.23%	44	1.62%	6	0.22%	18	0.66%	1,707	62.76%	2,720
Grand Traverse	3,407	81.39%	599	14.31%	136	3.25%	16	0.38%	21	0.50%	7	0.17%	2,808	67.08%	4,186
Gratiot	4,553	67.68%	1,863	27.69%	238	3.54%	46	0.68%	24	0.36%	3	0.04%	2,690	39.99%	6,727
Hillsdale	4,993	70.47%	1,670	23.57%	332	4.69%	49	0.69%	35	0.49%	6	0.08%	3,323	46.90%	7,085
Houghton	8,876	78.41%	1,475	13.03%	384	3.39%	529	4.67%	14	0.12%	42	0.37%	7,401	65.38%	11,320
Huron	4,209	71.17%	1,487	25.14%	170	2.87%	38	0.64%	8	0.14%	2	0.03%	2,722	46.03%	5,914
Ingham	6,846	60.53%	3,881	34.31%	387	3.42%	149	1.32%	29	0.26%	18	0.16%	2,965	26.22%	11,310
Ionia	5,464	63.91%	2,729	31.92%	246	2.88%	87	1.02%	16	0.19%	7	0.08%	2,735	31.99%	8,549
Iosco	1,492	75.35%	427	21.57%	35	1.77%	25	1.26%	1	0.05%	0	0.00%	1,065	53.79%	1,980
Iron	1,624	90.47%	140	7.80%	20	1.11%	3	0.17%	6	0.33%	2	0.11%	1,484	82.67%	1,795
Isabella	3,578	71.16%	1,320	26.25%	93	1.85%	18	0.36%	18	0.36%	1	0.02%	2,258	44.91%	5,028
Jackson	7,798	62.93%	4,131	33.34%	254	2.05%	111	0.90%	25	0.20%	72	0.58%	3,667	29.59%	12,391
Kalamazoo	7,226	62.31%	3,289	28.36%	498	4.29%	491	4.23%	27	0.23%	65	0.56%	3,937	33.95%	11,596
Kalkaska	1,362	84.07%	181	11.17%	70	4.32%	3	0.19%	4	0.25%	0	0.00%	1,181	72.90%	1,620
Kent	20,313	71.47%	6,504	22.88%	674	2.37%	833	2.93%	52	0.18%	45	0.16%	13,809	48.59%	28,421
Keweenaw	659	94.55%	29	4.16%	4	0.57%	2	0.29%	0	0.00%	3	0.43%	630	90.39%	697
Lake	908	79.09%	215	18.73%	10	0.87%	13	1.13%	2	0.17%	0	0.00%	693	60.37%	1,148
Lapeer	3,950	68.98%	1,529	26.70%	175	3.06%	57	1.00%	13	0.23%	2	0.03%	2,421	42.28%	5,726
Leelanau	1,479	75.42%	416	21.21%	59	3.01%	3	0.15%	2	0.10%	2	0.10%	1,063	54.21%	1,961
Lenawee	7,891	67.40%	3,334	28.48%	379	3.24%	44	0.38%	48	0.41%	11	0.09%	4,557	38.93%	11,707
Livingston	3,291	60.31%	1,991	36.49%	154	2.82%	9	0.16%	9	0.16%	3	0.05%	1,300	23.82%	5,457
Luce	371	80.83%	64	13.94%	16	3.49%	3	0.65%	1	0.22%	4	0.87%	307	66.88%	459
Mackinac	1,206	69.27%	506	29.06%	20	1.15%	5	0.29%	3	0.17%	1	0.06%	700	40.21%	1,741
Macomb	4,849	60.30%	2,992	37.20%	152	1.89%	30	0.37%	14	0.17%	5	0.06%	1,857	23.09%	8,042
Manistee	3,162	67.56%	1,226	26.20%	109	2.33%	157	3.35%	6	0.13%	20	0.43%	1,936	41.37%	4,680
Marquette	5,668	82.94%	785	11.49%	219	3.20%	121	1.77%	21	0.31%	20	0.29%	4,883	71.45%	6,834
Mason	2,422	72.23%	767	22.88%	124	3.70%	33	0.98%	5	0.15%	2	0.06%	1,655	49.36%	3,353
Mecosta	3,333	75.97%	900	20.52%	125	2.85%	26	0.59%	2	0.05%	1	0.02%	2,433	55.46%	4,387
Menominee	3,270	72.99%	994	22.19%	94	2.10%	103	2.30%	8	0.18%	11	0.25%	2,276	50.80%	4,480
Midland	2,121	70.68%	769	25.62%	74	2.47%	30	1.00%	6	0.20%	1	0.03%	1,352	45.05%	3,001
Missaukee	1,792	80.94%	341	15.40%	51	2.30%	20	0.90%	10	0.45%	0	0.00%	1,451	65.54%	2,214
Monroe	4,419	56.95%	3,136	40.42%	170	2.19%	16	0.21%	14	0.18%	4	0.05%	1,283	16.54%	7,759
Montcalm	5,342	76.75%	1,375	19.76%	166	2.39%	57	0.82%	8	0.11%	12	0.17%	3,967	57.00%	6,960
Montmorency	657	80.02%	152	18.51%	10	1.22%	0	0.00%	1	0.12%	1	0.12%	505	61.51%	821
Muskegon	5,490	76.48%	1,184	16.49%	104	1.45%	380	5.29%	5	0.07%	15	0.21%	4,306	59.99%	7,178
Newaygo	2,981	75.79%	794	20.19%	135	3.43%	16	0.41%	4	0.10%	3	0.08%	2,187	55.61%	3,933
Oakland	7,020	61.90%	3,971	35.02%	263	2.32%	61	0.54%	19	0.17%	6	0.05%	3,049	26.89%	11,340
Oceana	2,664	75.66%	594	16.87%	203	5.77%	46	1.31%	12	0.34%	2	0.06%	2,070	58.79%	3,521
Ogemaw	1,325	75.50%	328	18.69%	84	4.79%	9	0.51%	8	0.46%	1	0.06%	997	56.81%	1,755
Ontonagon	1,352	77.08%	356	20.30%	17	0.97%	22	1.25%	3	0.17%	4	0.23%	996	56.78%	1,754
Osceola	2,955	80.21%	565	15.34%	138	3.75%	14	0.38%	7	0.19%	5	0.14%	2,390	64.88%	3,684
Oscoda	326	86.24%	44	11.64%	7	1.85%	1	0.26%	0	0.00%	0	0.00%	282	74.60%	378
Otsego	1,244	78.83%	267	16.92%	45	2.85%	14	0.89%	4	0.25%	4	0.25%	977	61.91%	1,578
Ottawa	5,928	75.35%	1,553	19.74%	178	2.26%	169	2.15%	19	0.24%	20	0.25%	4,375	55.61%	7,867
Presque Isle	1,861	82.86%	365	16.25%	13	0.58%	5	0.22%	1	0.04%	1	0.04%	1,496	66.61%	2,246
Roscommon	375	71.43%	116	22.10%	13	2.48%	20	3.81%	0	0.00%	1	0.19%	259	49.33%	525
Saginaw	10,164	60.65%	5,336	31.84%	205	1.22%	961	5.73%	22	0.13%	71	0.42%	4,828	28.81%	16,759
Sanilac	4,688	74.37%	1,221	19.37%	341	5.41%	24	0.38%	25	0.40%	5	0.08%	3,467	55.00%	6,304
Schoolcraft	1,481	83.48%	226	12.74%	42	2.37%	20	1.13%	3	0.17%	2	0.11%	1,255	70.74%	1,774
Shiawassee	5,576	66.18%	2,250	26.71%	465	5.52%	102	1.21%	16	0.19%	16	0.19%	3,326	39.48%	8,425
St. Clair	8,323	69.00%	3,252	26.96%	243	2.01%	212	1.76%	14	0.12%	18	0.15%	5,071	42.04%	12,062
St. Joseph	3,659	59.89%	2,174	35.58%	122	2.00%	109	1.78%	37	0.61%	9	0.15%	1,485	24.30%	6,110
Tuscola	5,016	72.21%	1,520	21.88%	351	5.05%	41	0.59%	14	0.20%	4	0.06%	3,496	50.33%	6,946
Van Buren	5,297	72.77%	1,637	22.49%	217	2.98%	73	1.00%	46	0.63%	9	0.12%	3,660	50.28%	7,279
Washtenaw	6,586	62.11%	3,780	35.65%	173	1.63%	35	0.33%	11	0.10%	19	0.18%	2,806	26.46%	10,604
Wayne	50,047	69.14%	20,471	28.28%	450	0.62%	1,214	1.68%	59	0.08%	148	0.20%	29,576	40.86%	72,389
Wexford	3,010	76.38%	691	17.53%	221	5.61%	12	0.30%	5	0.13%	2	0.05%	2,319	58.84%	3,941
Totals	364,957	69.51%	135,392	25.79%	13,441	2.56%	9,042	1.72%	1,159	0.22%	1,036	0.20%	229,565	43.72%	525,027

==== Counties that flipped from Democratic to Republican ====
- St. Joseph

== See also ==
- United States presidential elections in Michigan
