= Crandell Park =

Park in Eaton County, United States of America

- Location within Michigan
- Location: Eaton County, Michigan, US
- Nearest city: Charlotte, Michigan
- Coordinates: 42°33′17″N 84°46′16″W
- Area: 432 acres (0.675 mi^{2})
- Established: 2017
- Governing body: Eaton County

Crandell Park is a public park in Eaton County, Michigan covering about 432 acres (0.675 mi^{2}). The park is located about 2 miles east of Charlotte. The entrance to the park is off Michigan highway M-50. It is Eaton County's newest park, being established in 2017. Crandell Lake (located within the park) is Eaton County's largest lake at 160 acres (0.25 mi^{2}) in size.

Crandell Park was established in 2017, after Eaton County purchased the land for US$3.9 million in 2016 from a local resident named Randy Crandell. The transaction was made possible due to a Michigan Department of Natural Resources (DNR) grant. The grant covered 75% of the cost, and Crandell donated the remaining 25%.

== Facilities ==
The park is available to the public for recreational use. The walking trail that goes around the lake is a just under 3 miles (4.8 km) long. A few recreational activities available to park goers include kayaking, canoeing, fishing, walking, running, and bird watching. Parking is located at the southeast section of the park, right on M-50. Also located in the same area of the park are restrooms and a kayak launch.

== Highways ==
- M-50

== See also ==
- List of lakes in Michigan
