= Grand Ledge Public Schools =

School district in Michigan, United States

Address
- 220 Lamson Street Grand Ledge, Eaton, Michigan, 48837; United States

District information
- Grades: PreK-12
- Superintendent: Bill Barnes
- Schools: 8
- Budget: $97,053,000 2022-2023 total expenditures
- NCES District ID: 2616410

Students and staff
- Students: 5,440 (2024-25)
- Teachers: 304.16 FTE (2024-25)
- Staff: 669.29 FTE (2024-25)
- Student–teacher ratio: 17.89 (2024-25)
- Athletic conference: Capital Area Activities Conference
- District mascot: Comets
- Colors: Navy blue and gold

Other information
- Website: www.glcomets.net

Grand Ledge Public Schools is a Michigan school district that includes the city of Grand Ledge and the village of Mulliken, as well as portions of the townships of Danby in Ionia County, Eagle, Watertown, and Westphalia in Clinton County, and Delta, Oneida, Roxand, and Windsor in Eaton County.

== History ==
Grand Ledge High School opened in fall 1959. At the time, the former high school became Jonas Sawdon Junior High School for grades seven and eight. By 1995, this building housed the district administration.

In 2018, a three-phase bond was based in the district. This included school renovations and improvements to athletic and other school-related facilities. Some major projects included a new track & field complex located along M-43 and just southeast of the existing track & field facility, a brand new weight room and performing arts addition to the high school, and new Wacousta Elementary School (opened in fall 2024).

== Athletics ==
Grand Ledge High School has a rich athletics history in Mid-Michigan. Known as a baseball powerhouse for their state titles in 1977 and 1995, they have also won state titles in boys' golf (1995), football (2000), and girls' gymnastics (2008, 2009, 2010, 2011, 2012, 2013).

Notable figures from Grand Ledge High School:

- Matt Greene (2012 & 2014 Stanley Cup Champion, 2001 graduate)
- Al Horford (2024 NBA Champion, 2004 graduate)
- Pat O'Keefe (legendary baseball and football coach, led school to all state titles in both baseball and football)

All three individuals are members of the Grand Ledge Athletics Hall of Fame.

== Schools ==
List of Schools in Grand Ledge School District
School	Address	Notes
High School (Grades 9-12)
Grand Ledge High School	820 Spring Street, Grand Ledge	Built 1959.
Middle School (Grades 7-8)
Kenneth T. Beagle Middle School	600 South Street, Grand Ledge	Built 1975.
Intermediate School (Grades 5-6)
Leon W. Hayes Intermediate School	12620 Nixon Road, Grand Ledge	Built 1967.
Elementary Schools (Grades K-4)
Delta Center Elementary	305 South Canal Road, Lansing	Built 1959.
T. Carl Holbrook Elementary	615 Jones Street, Grand Ledge	Built 1953.
Wacousta Elementary	9325 Herbison Road, Eagle	Original built in 1975, new building built in 2024.
Willow Ridge Elementary	12840 Nixon Road, Grand Ledge	Built 1997.
Preschools
Delta Mills Early Childhood Center	6816 Delta River Drive, Lansing	Built 1958.
Clarence W. Neff Early Childhood Center	950 Jenne Street, Grand Ledge	Built 1954.

Prior to the 2021-22 school year, Leon W. Hayes School was the middle school (grades 7-8), Delta Center, Willow Ridge, Wacousta, and Kenneth T. Beagle Schools were the elementary schools (grades 1-6), Clarence W. Neff School was the district-wide kindergarten building, and T. Carl Holbrook and Delta Mills Schools were the early childhood centers.
