= Lake Delta =

Lake in the state of Michigan, United States

- Location within Michigan
- Location: Delta Township, Michigan
- Coordinates: 42°41′09″N 84°39′30″W
- Type: Lake

Lake Delta is a 40-acre (16 ha) lake in Delta Township, Michigan, just a few miles southwest of the state's capitol of Lansing, in Eaton County. Running adjacent to the lake is Interstate 96 (I-96) to the west, and Interstate 69 to the northwest.

== Overview ==
Lake Delta features both dock and shore fishing, located south of the Lansing Board of Water and Light facility. It has three fishing docks. They are located on the northwest, east, and southern sections of the lake. The lake is available to local residents from April through November, contingent on weather conditions.

=== Highways ===
- I-69
- I-96
