= Eaton County, Michigan =

County in Michigan, United States

- County
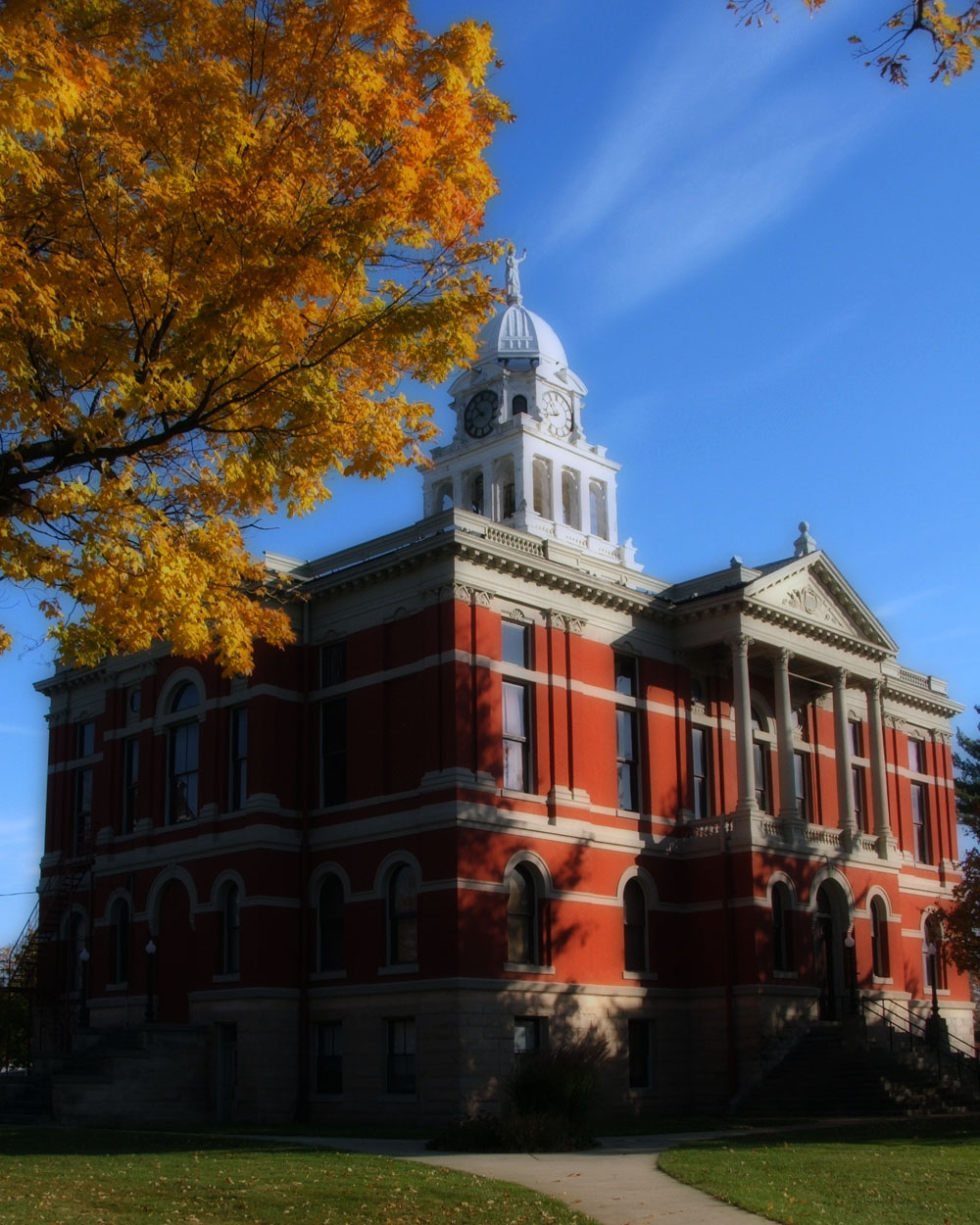
- Eaton County Courthouse

- Seal

- Location within the U.S. state of Michigan
- Coordinates: 42°35′N 84°51′W
- Country: United States
- State: Michigan
- Founded: 1837
- Named for: John Eaton
- Seat: Charlotte
- Largest city: Charlotte

Area
  - Total: 579 sq mi (1,500 km^{2})
  - Land: 575 sq mi (1,490 km^{2})
  - Water: 4.3 sq mi (11 km^{2}) 0.7%

Population (2020)
  - Total: 109,175
  - Estimate (2025): 109,581 ▲
  - Density: 190/sq mi (73.3/km^{2})
- Time zone: UTC−5 (Eastern)
  - Summer (DST): UTC−4 (EDT)
- Congressional districts: 2nd, 7th
- Website: www.eatoncounty.org

Eaton County is a county in the U.S. state of Michigan. As of the 2020 United States census, the population was 109,175. The county seat is Charlotte. The county was organized in 1837 and was named for John Eaton, who was Secretary of War under U.S. President Andrew Jackson, making it one of Michigan's Cabinet counties. Eaton County is included in the Lansing-East Lansing, Metropolitan Statistical area in Central Michigan.

== History ==
Eaton County was organized in 1837 from open territory. It was named after John H. Eaton, an American Secretary of War. The county is one of the so-called Cabinet counties because it was named after a member of the cabinet of US President Andrew Jackson.

Eaton County was created by the Michigan Territorial Legislature on October 29, 1829: "That as much of the country as is included within the following limits, viz., north of the base line and south of the line between townships four and five north of the base line, and east of the line between ranges six and seven west of the meridian, and west of the line between ranges two and three west of the meridian, be and the same is set off into a separate county, and the name thereof shall be Eaton." The county was named in honor of Gen. John H. Eaton, secretary of war in the cabinet of President Andrew Jackson. The following week (November 4), the legislature added this directive: "That the county of Eaton shall be attached to and compose a part of the county of St. Joseph." On November 5, they also added an act to direct that the counties of Eaton, Branch and Calhoun, and all the country north attached to Eaton be set off into a township by the name of Eaton, and it was ordered that the first town meeting should be held at the house of Jabez Bronson, who lived on the site of the present village of Bronson in Branch county. This was no hardship, for there was not at that time a single white settler within the bounds of Eaton county.

The following summer (July 30, 1830), the Territorial Legislature changed Eaton's assignment, attaching it to Kalamazoo for administrative, revenue, and judicial purposes. Then on March 17, 1835, it directed: "That the county of Eaton shall be a township of Belleville,' and the first township meeting shall be held at such place as the sheriff of Calhoun county shall appoint in said county of Eaton, and shall be attached to the county of Eaton for all judicial purposes."

By 1837 the Territory had been admitted to the Union as a State. On December 29 of that year, the new state legislature created Eaton County as an independent entity: "That the county of Eaton be and the same is hereby organized, and the inhabitants thereof entitled to all the rights and privileges to which by law the inhabitants of other counties of this state are entitled."

While the name "Belleville" was given to the first organized township, including the whole county, it does not appear to have been used in any official documents. The second place where the name of the township is mentioned in a legislative enactment is on March 17 in the session laws of 1837, where it appears under the name of "Bellevue." Official business has always been transacted under the latter name, and yet there is no known law showing that the name has ever been legally changed from "Belleville."

The first division of the town of Bellevue occurred on March 11, 1837, when Eaton and Vermontville were organized. The four northwestern townships, now Vermontville, Chester, Roxand and Sunfield, were set off as a township and named Vermontville; while the four southeastern townships, now Eaton, Eaton Rapids, Hamlin, and Brookfield were organized as the township of Eaton.

This left the four northeastern towns, Benton, Oneida, Delta, and Windsor, and the four remaining towns, Bellevue, Kalamo, Carmel, and Walton, cornering at the geographical center of the county in a single organized township known as Bellevue. But on March 6, 1838, the northeast quarter of the county was detached from Bellevue and was formed as the town of Oneida.

In 1832, a surveyor, George W. Barnes, bought a homestead in central Eaton County; that area is now contained in Charlotte. On March 21, 1833, he applied to Territorial Governor George B. Porter for a commission to be appointed to locate the county seat: "That in the month of may last he put up in three public places in the county of Kalamazoo notices that application would be made to the governor of the territory of Michigan to appoint commissioners to locate a seat of justice for Eaton County, agreeably to the law in such cases made and provided." Accordingly, three locals (Charles C. Hascall, Stillman Blanchard, John W. Strong) were named on April 29. On June 5 they reported to the Governor that they met "at Prairie Ronde [Round] in the county of Kalamazoo on the 27th day of May, 1833, and on June 4, located the county seat on land which is owned by George W. Barnes. The point selected for the seat of justice in this county is on a beautiful prairie, about one mile square, near two and a half miles south of the center of the county, and about one mile north of the Battle creek, the nearest point to the center of the county where water can be obtained for hydraulic purposes."

== Geography ==
According to the US Census Bureau, the county has a total area of 579 square miles (1,500 km^{2}), of which 575 square miles (1,490 km^{2}) is land and 4.3 square miles (11 km^{2}) (0.7%) is water.

=== Rivers ===
- Battle Creek River
- Grand River
- Thornapple River

=== Lakes ===
- Crandell Lake
- Lake Delta
- Lake Interstate
- Pine Lake

=== Adjacent counties ===
- Clinton County – northeast
- Ingham County – east
- Jackson County – southeast
- Calhoun County - south
- Barry County – west
- Ionia County – northwest

== Transportation ==
=== Major highways ===
- I-69
- BL I-69
- BL I-69
- I-96
- BL I-96
- I-496
- M-43
- M-50
- M-66
- M-78
- M-79
- M-99
- M-100
- M-188

=== Airports ===
- Fitch H. Beach Airport - general aviation airport in Charlotte.
- Capital Region International Airport in Clinton County, Michigan, northeast of Eaton County – airline service.
- Rapids Airway Airport (light aviation, grass field, private use only) - two miles (3.2 km) NE of Eaton Rapids.

== Demographics ==
Historical population
Census	Pop.	Note	%±
1840	2,379		—
1850	7,058		196.7%
1860	16,476		133.4%
1870	25,171		52.8%
1880	31,225		24.1%
1890	32,094		2.8%
1900	31,668		−1.3%
1910	30,499		−3.7%
1920	29,377		−3.7%
1930	31,728		8.0%
1940	34,124		7.6%
1950	40,023		17.3%
1960	49,684		24.1%
1970	68,892		38.7%
1980	88,337		28.2%
1990	92,879		5.1%
2000	103,655		11.6%
2010	107,759		4.0%
2020	109,175		1.3%
2025 (est.)	109,581	▲	0.4%
US Decennial Census; 1790-1960 1900-1990; 1990-2000 2010-2018

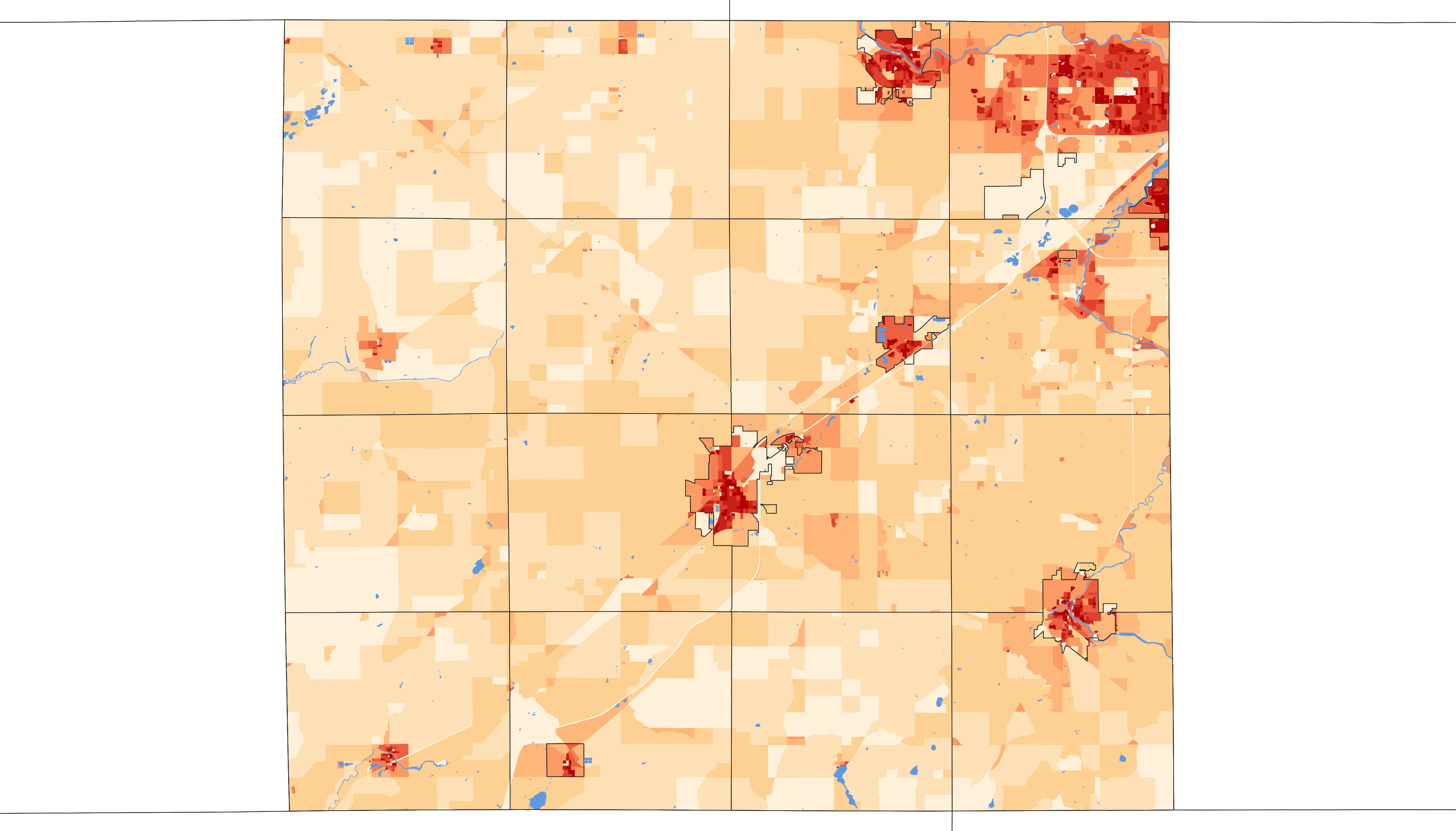
Population density of Eaton County MI by 2020 census block

=== Racial and ethnic composition ===
Eaton County, Michigan – Racial and ethnic composition Note: the US Census treats Hispanic/Latino as an ethnic category. This table excludes Latinos from the racial categories and assigns them to a separate category. Hispanics/Latinos may be of any race.
Race / Ethnicity (NH = Non-Hispanic)	Pop 1980	Pop 1990	Pop 2000	Pop 2010	Pop 2020	% 1980	% 1990	% 2000	% 2010	% 2020
White alone (NH)	83,914	86,410	91,895	91,540	87,200	94.99%	93.04%	88.65%	84.95%	79.87%
Black or African American alone (NH)	1,967	3,271	5,397	6,661	7,463	2.23%	3.52%	5.21%	6.18%	6.84%
Native American or Alaska Native alone (NH)	264	406	418	407	307	0.30%	0.44%	0.40%	0.38%	0.28%
Asian alone (NH)	399	543	1,150	1,790	2,444	0.45%	0.58%	1.11%	1.66%	2.24%
Native Hawaiian or Pacific Islander alone (NH)	x	x	25	13	13	x	x	0.02%	0.01%	0.01%
Other race alone (NH)	177	50	110	115	346	0.20%	0.05%	0.11%	0.11%	0.32%
Mixed race or Multiracial (NH)	x	x	1,337	2,132	4,875	x	x	1.29%	1.98%	4.47%
Hispanic or Latino (any race)	1,616	2,199	3,323	5,101	6,527	1.83%	2.37%	3.21%	4.73%	5.98%
Total	88,337	92,879	103,655	107,759	109,175	100.00%	100.00%	100.00%	100.00%	100.00%

=== 2020 census ===
As of the 2020 census, the county had a population of 109,175. The median age was 41.4 years, with 21.2% of residents under the age of 18 and 19.5% of residents 65 years of age or older. For every 100 females there were 96.3 males, and for every 100 females age 18 and over there were 93.5 males age 18 and over.

As of the 2020 census, the racial makeup of the county was 81.8% White, 7.0% Black or African American, 0.4% American Indian and Alaska Native, 2.3% Asian, <0.1% Native Hawaiian and Pacific Islander, 1.7% from some other race, and 6.7% from two or more races, with Hispanic or Latino residents of any race comprising 6.0% of the population.

As of the 2020 census, 62.0% of residents lived in urban areas while 38.0% lived in rural areas.

As of the 2020 census, there were 44,950 households in the county, of which 27.2% had children under the age of 18 living in them. Of all households, 48.1% were married-couple households, 17.9% were households with a male householder and no spouse or partner present, and 26.5% were households with a female householder and no spouse or partner present. About 29.3% of all households were made up of individuals and 12.7% had someone living alone who was 65 years of age or older.

As of the 2020 census, there were 47,497 housing units, of which 5.4% were vacant. Among occupied housing units, 72.6% were owner-occupied and 27.4% were renter-occupied. The homeowner vacancy rate was 1.1% and the rental vacancy rate was 6.4%.

=== 2010 census ===
As of the 2010 United States census, there were 107,759 people living in the county. 87.8% were White, 6.3% Black or African American, 1.7% Asian, 0.4% Native American, 1.2% of some other race and 2.6% of two or more races. 4.7% were Hispanic or Latino (of any race). 24.2% were of English ancestry, 22.9% were of German ancestry and 9.3% were of Irish ancestry.

=== 2000 census ===
As of the 2000 United States census, there were 103,655 people, 40,167 households, and 28,237 families in the county. The population density was 180 inhabitants per square mile (69/km^{2}). There were 42,118 housing units at an average density of 73 per square mile (28/km^{2}). The racial makeup of the county was 90.25% White, 5.29% Black or African American, 0.44% Native American, 1.13% Asian, 0.03% Pacific Islander, 1.17% from other races, and 1.70% from two or more races. 3.21% of the population were Hispanic or Latino of any race. 95.6% spoke only English, while 2.0% spoke Spanish.

There were 40,167 households, out of which 33.80% had children under the age of 18 living with them, 56.30% were married couples living together, 10.30% had a female householder with no husband present, and 29.70% were non-families. 24.50% of all households were made up of individuals, and 8.40% had someone living alone who was 65 years of age or older. The average household size was 2.54 and the average family size was 3.03.

The county population contained 26.10% under the age of 18, 9.10% from 18 to 24, 28.80% from 25 to 44, 24.60% from 45 to 64, and 11.30% who were 65 years of age or older. The median age was 36 years. For every 100 females, there were 94.60 males. For every 100 females age 18 and over, there were 91.50 males.

The median income for a household in the county was $49,588, and the median income for a family was $57,898. Males had a median income of $41,978 versus $29,638 for females. The per capita income for the county was $22,411. About 4.10% of families and 5.80% of the population were below the poverty line, including 6.80% of those under age 18 and 5.90% of those age 65 or over.

== Government ==
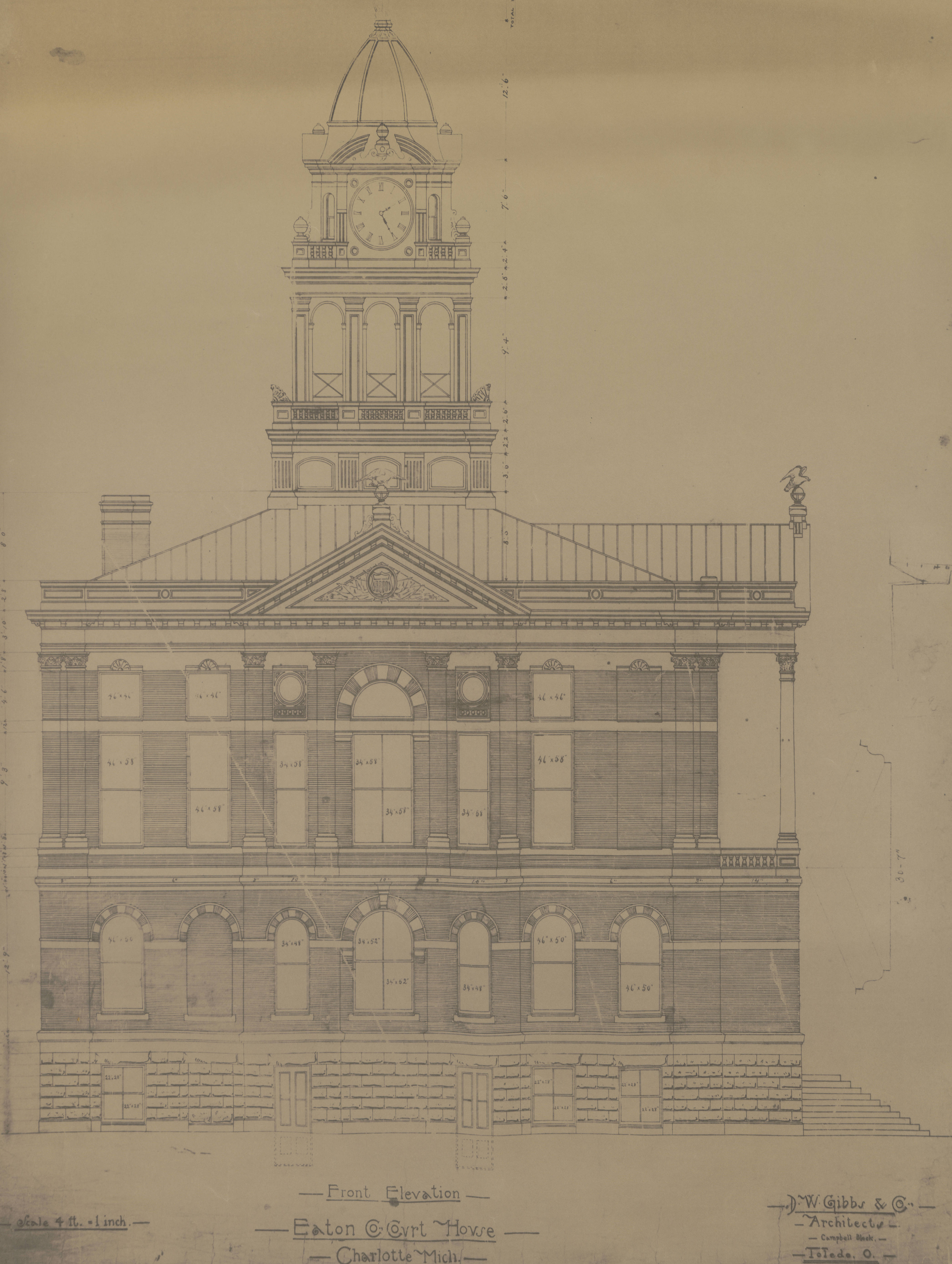
Architectural drawing for the Eaton County Courthouse, designed by David W. Gibbs and Company, 1880s

Eaton County has been reliably Republican for most of its history. Since 1884, the Republican Party nominee has carried the county vote in 81% of the elections (29 of 36 elections) for president. However, population growth in Lansing and the surrounding area has made the county more competitive in recent years. Barack Obama carried the county in both 2008 and 2012, as did Michigan governor Jennifer Granholm, a Democrat, in her winning gubernatorial campaigns of 2002 and 2006. In 2014, Republican governor Rick Snyder narrowly lost the county while winning statewide. Donald Trump won by narrow margins in 2016 and 2020, and won a majority in 2024.

United States presidential election results for Eaton County, Michigan
Year	Republican		Democratic		Third party(ies)	
Year	No.	%	No.	%	No.	%
1884	4,106	49.37%	3,717	44.69%	494	5.94%
1888	4,624	52.11%	3,266	36.81%	983	11.08%
1892	3,788	48.24%	2,837	36.13%	1,228	15.64%
1896	4,270	46.97%	4,631	50.95%	189	2.08%
1900	4,809	53.78%	3,908	43.70%	225	2.52%
1904	5,553	69.39%	2,141	26.75%	309	3.86%
1908	4,364	55.92%	3,131	40.12%	309	3.96%
1912	2,333	32.02%	2,482	34.06%	2,472	33.92%
1916	3,802	50.82%	3,461	46.26%	218	2.91%
1920	7,343	70.99%	2,727	26.36%	274	2.65%
1924	8,232	73.66%	2,462	22.03%	481	4.30%
1928	8,493	78.38%	2,285	21.09%	58	0.54%
1932	5,840	44.34%	6,887	52.29%	445	3.38%
1936	6,649	47.39%	6,780	48.32%	602	4.29%
1940	9,864	63.26%	5,645	36.20%	85	0.55%
1944	9,975	65.89%	5,049	33.35%	116	0.77%
1948	8,637	64.84%	4,264	32.01%	419	3.15%
1952	13,723	72.16%	5,170	27.18%	125	0.66%
1956	13,762	69.33%	6,053	30.49%	35	0.18%
1960	14,163	66.97%	6,912	32.68%	74	0.35%
1964	8,919	41.38%	12,590	58.41%	46	0.21%
1968	14,184	57.13%	8,347	33.62%	2,295	9.24%
1972	20,413	68.47%	8,986	30.14%	412	1.38%
1976	22,120	63.65%	12,083	34.77%	547	1.57%
1980	22,927	57.35%	12,742	31.87%	4,308	10.78%
1984	27,720	72.57%	10,290	26.94%	189	0.49%
1988	24,193	60.78%	15,322	38.49%	291	0.73%
1992	18,669	38.99%	16,752	34.99%	12,462	26.03%
1996	20,092	44.98%	19,781	44.29%	4,793	10.73%
2000	24,803	50.34%	23,211	47.11%	1,258	2.55%
2004	29,781	53.41%	25,411	45.58%	563	1.01%
2008	25,900	44.95%	30,742	53.36%	974	1.69%
2012	26,197	47.82%	27,913	50.95%	678	1.24%
2016	27,609	48.80%	24,938	44.08%	4,028	7.12%
2020	31,798	49.43%	31,299	48.66%	1,230	1.91%
2024	33,102	50.76%	31,056	47.63%	1,050	1.61%

United States Senate election results for Eaton County, Michigan1
Year	Republican		Democratic		Third party(ies)	
Year	No.	%	No.	%	No.	%
2024	31,627	48.94%	31,453	48.67%	1,549	2.40%

Michigan Gubernatorial election results for Eaton County
Year	Republican		Democratic		Third party(ies)	
Year	No.	%	No.	%	No.	%
2022	23,828	44.49%	28,806	53.78%	924	1.73%

The county government operates the jail, maintains rural roads, operates the major local courts, records deeds, mortgages, and vital records, administers public health regulations, and participates with the state in the provision of social services. The county board of commissioners controls the budget and has limited authority to make laws or ordinances. In Michigan, most local government functions — police and fire, building and zoning, tax assessment, street maintenance, etc. — are the responsibility of individual cities and townships.

=== Elected officials ===
- Prosecuting Attorney: Doug Lloyd (R)
- Sheriff: Tom Reich (D)
- County Clerk/Register of Deeds: Diana Bosworth (R)
- County Treasurer: Bob Robinson, APR (D)
- Drain Commissioner: Richard Wagner (R)
- Circuit Court Judge: Jan Cunningham
- Circuit Court Judge: John Maurer
- Probate Court Judge: Thomas K. Byerley

=== County Board of Commissioners ===
15 members, elected from districts (8 Republicans, 7 Democrats)

== Education ==
School districts located in Eaton County:

- Bellevue Community Schools, Bellevue
- Charlotte Public Schools, Charlotte
- Eaton Intermediate School District, Charlotte
- Eaton Rapids Public Schools, Eaton Rapids
- Grand Ledge Public Schools, Grand Ledge. Village of Mulliken schools was annexed by Grand Ledge Public Schools
- Maple Valley Schools, Vermontville
- Olivet Community Schools, Olivet
- Oneida Township S/D #3, Oneida Township
- Potterville Public Schools, Potterville
- Roxand Township School District #12, Roxand Township
- Waverly Community Schools, Delta Township

Some county residents attend out-of-county schools:

- Village of Dimondale (Holt Public Schools, Holt, Ingham County)
- Village of Sunfield (Lakewood Public Schools, Lake Odessa, Ionia County)
- A small portion of northeast Delta Township (Lansing Public Schools, Lansing, Ingham County)
- Ingham Intermediate School District (Waverly Community Schools, Village of Dimondale, portion of Delta Township)
- Ionia Intermediate School District (Village of Sunfield)
- Calhoun Intermediate School District (Bellevue Community Schools, Olivet Community Schools)

== Communities ==
=== Cities ===
- Charlotte (county seat)
- Eaton Rapids
- Grand Ledge
- Lansing (partial)
- Olivet
- Potterville

=== Villages ===
- Bellevue
- Dimondale
- Mulliken
- Sunfield
- Vermontville

=== Census-designated place ===
- Waverly

=== Other unincorporated communities ===
- Ainger (called Thurman in 1887)
- Bismark
- Brookfield
- Canada Settlement
- Carlisle (called Hyde's Mills until 1843)
- Charlesworth
- Chester
- Clinton Junction
- Delta Center
- Delta Mills (originally called Grand River City)
- Delwood
- East Walton
- Elmira
- Five Points Corner
- Gresham
- Hoytville
- Kalamo
- Kelly
- Kingsland
- Little Venice
- Millett (originally called Millett's Station)
- Moore's Station
- Needmore
- Oneida Center
- Packard
- Petrieville
- Shaytown
- Stalls Corner
- Walton (called East Bellevue until 1840)
- West Benton
- West Windsor
- Woodbury

=== Townships ===
- Bellevue Township
- Benton Charter Township
- Brookfield Township
- Carmel Township
- Chester Township
- Delta Charter Township
- Eaton Rapids Township
- Eaton Township
- Hamlin Township
- Kalamo Township
- Oneida Charter Township
- Roxand Township
- Sunfield Township
- Vermontville Township
- Walton Township
- Windsor Charter Township

== See also ==
- List of Michigan State Historic Sites in Eaton County
- National Register of Historic Places listings in Eaton County, Michigan
