= Benton Township, Eaton County, Michigan =

Benton Township, Michigan
- Charter township
- Charter Township of Benton
- Location within the state of Michigan Benton Township, Michigan (the United States)
- Coordinates: 42°38′43″N 84°47′07″W
- Country: United States
- State: Michigan
- County: Eaton
- Organized: 1843

Area
  - Total: 33.7 sq mi (87.4 km^{2})
  - Land: 33.7 sq mi (87.4 km^{2})
  - Water: 0 sq mi (0.0 km^{2})
- Elevation: 879 ft (268 m)

Population (2020)
  - Total: 2,766
  - Density: 82.0/sq mi (31.6/km^{2})
- Time zone: UTC-5 (Eastern (EST))
  - Summer (DST): UTC-4 (EDT)
- ZIP codes: 48813 (Charlotte, 48837 (Grand Ledge), 48876 (Potterville)
- Area code: 517
- FIPS code: 26-07440
- GNIS feature ID: 1625917
- Website: https://bentontownship.net/

Benton Charter Township is a charter township of Eaton County in the U.S. state of Michigan. As of the 2020 census, the township population was 2,766.

When the township was organized in 1843, the Michigan State Legislature named it "Tom Benton", after Thomas Hart Benton, the notable U.S. Senator from Missouri. The name was changed to simply "Benton" in 1845.

== Communities ==
- The city of Potterville is within the township, but is administratively autonomous. The Potterville ZIP code, 48876 serves areas in the eastern part of Benton Township.
- West Benton was a rural post office in the western part of the township, which operated from January 12, 1855 until October 19, 1860.
- The city of Charlotte is to the southwest, and the Charlotte ZIP code 48813 serves portions of Benton Township.
- The city of Grand Ledge is to the north, and the Grand Ledge ZIP code 48837 serves areas in the northern part of Benton Township.

== Geography ==
According to the United States Census Bureau, the township has a total area of 33.7 square miles (87 km^{2}), all land.

== Demographics ==
As of the census of 2000, there were 2,712 people, 991 households, and 814 families residing in the township. The population density was 80.4 inhabitants per square mile (31.0/km^{2}). There were 1,018 housing units at an average density of 30.2 per square mile (11.7/km^{2}). The racial makeup of the township was 96.87% White, 0.44% African American, 0.26% Native American, 1.11% from other races, and 1.33% from two or more races. Hispanic or Latino of any race were 3.58% of the population.

There were 991 households, out of which 33.8% had children under the age of 18 living with them, 71.0% were married couples living together, 8.3% had a female householder with no husband present, and 17.8% were non-families. 13.4% of all households were made up of individuals, and 4.2% had someone living alone who was 65 years of age or older. The average household size was 2.72 and the average family size was 2.96.

In the township the population was spread out, with 24.7% under the age of 18, 8.0% from 18 to 24, 28.0% from 25 to 44, 30.0% from 45 to 64, and 9.4% who were 65 years of age or older. The median age was 39 years. For every 100 females, there were 97.8 males. For every 100 females age 18 and over, there were 98.3 males.

The median income for a household in the township was $56,815, and the median income for a family was $61,576. Males had a median income of $40,815 versus $31,453 for females. The per capita income for the township was $23,990. About 0.2% of families and 2.0% of the population were below the poverty line, including 0.3% of those under age 18 and 3.8% of those age 65 or over.
