= Sunfield Township, Michigan =

- Township
- Location within the state of Michigan Sunfield Township, Michigan (the United States)
- Coordinates: 42°43′41″N 85°0′37″W
- Country: United States
- State: Michigan
- County: Eaton

Area
  - Total: 36.4 sq mi (94.2 km^{2})
  - Land: 36.0 sq mi (93.3 km^{2})
  - Water: 0.31 sq mi (0.8 km^{2})
- Elevation: 869 ft (265 m)

Population (2020)
  - Total: 2,050
  - Density: 56.9/sq mi (22.0/km^{2})
- Time zone: UTC-5 (Eastern (EST))
  - Summer (DST): UTC-4 (EDT)
- ZIP code: 48890
- Area code: 517
- FIPS code: 26-77440
- GNIS feature ID: 1627139
- Website: http://www.sunfieldtownship.org

Sunfield Township is a civil township of Eaton County in the U.S. state of Michigan. The population was 2,050 at the 2020 census, up from 1,997 at the 2010 census.

== Communities ==
- The Village of Sunfield is the only incorporated municipality within the township.
- Bismark was a post office in the southern part of the township. Brothers Silas P. and J. Hatch Loomis emigrated here in 1835. A post office named Bismark was established on January 26, 1871, with Hatch J. Loomis as the first postmaster, and operated until June 30, 1904.
- Clinton Junction was an unincorporated community that developed around a sawmill. It had a post office from 1871 until 1874.
- Delwood was an unincorporated community in the township. It had a post office from 1882 until 1903.
- Little Venice is an unincorporated community on M-50 (Clinton Trail) and the junction with Dow Road from the north and Granger Highway from the west at 42°41′26″N 84°57′21″W
- Shaytown is an unincorporated community approximately one mile northwest of Little Venice at the junction of M-50 (Clinton Trail) and Shaytown Road at 42°42′15″N 84°58′34″W
- Woodbury is an unincorporated community in the northwest corner of the township at 42°45′40″N 85°04′28″W. It was founded as the Chicago, Kalamazoo and Saginaw Railway came through the area in 1889, and was named for a railroad official. A post office opened on November 18, 1889 with Charles A. Lapo as the first postmaster, and operated until November 15, 1933.

== Geography ==
According to the United States Census Bureau, the township has a total area of 36.4 square miles (94.2 km^{2}), of which 36.0 square miles (93.3 km^{2}) is land and 0.3 square mile (0.8 km^{2}) (0.88%) is water.

== Demographics ==
As of the census of 2000, there were 2,177 people, 777 households, and 619 families residing in the township. The population density was 60.4 inhabitants per square mile (23.3/km^{2}). There were 826 housing units at an average density of 22.9 per square mile (8.8/km^{2}). The racial makeup of the township was 97.29% White, 0.23% African American, 0.09% Native American, 0.09% Asian, 0.73% from other races, and 1.56% from two or more races. Hispanic or Latino of any race were 2.30% of the population.

There were 777 households, out of which 35.6% had children under the age of 18 living with them, 67.1% were married couples living together, 6.9% had a female householder with no husband present, and 20.3% were non-families. 16.6% of all households were made up of individuals, and 5.8% had someone living alone who was 65 years of age or older. The average household size was 2.78 and the average family size was 3.12.

In the township the population was spread out, with 27.1% under the age of 18, 8.7% from 18 to 24, 28.3% from 25 to 44, 24.6% from 45 to 64, and 11.2% who were 65 years of age or older. The median age was 37 years. For every 100 females, there were 102.3 males. For every 100 females age 18 and over, there were 101.3 males.

The median income for a household in the township was $50,104, and the median income for a family was $54,813. Males had a median income of $43,816 versus $25,536 for females. The per capita income for the township was $19,291. About 3.4% of families and 4.2% of the population were below the poverty line, including 4.7% of those under age 18 and 3.2% of those age 65 or over.
