= Cabinet counties =

Group of ten counties in southern Michigan

Michigan with the Cabinet counties in red

The Cabinet counties are ten counties in the southern part of the U.S. state of Michigan named after President Andrew Jackson and people who served in his Cabinet. The Michigan Territorial legislature created 12 counties on October 29, 1829, naming eight of them after members of the recently elected Jackson's cabinet. Cass County was also created in 1829 and named for Lewis Cass, the Territorial Governor at the time. Cass later served in Jackson's Cabinet, making a case for it to be included as a Cabinet county. Livingston County was created in 1833 and named for Edward Livingston, Jackson's Secretary of State at the time.

The generally accepted reason for the naming of these counties after Jackson Administration members is that the Michigan Territory was trying to gain the support of these officials in its border dispute with Ohio over the Toledo Strip.

In one of his last acts in office, Jackson signed the 1837 bill making Michigan the 26th state.

== Counties ==
- Barry County, named for Postmaster General William T. Barry
- Berrien County, named for Attorney General John M. Berrien
- Branch County, named for Secretary of the Navy John Branch
- Calhoun County, named for Vice President John C. Calhoun
- Cass County, named for Jackson's second Secretary of War, Lewis Cass
- Eaton County, named for Secretary of War John Eaton
- Ingham County, named for Secretary of the Treasury Samuel D. Ingham
- Jackson County, named for Andrew Jackson himself
- Livingston County, named for Jackson's second Secretary of State, Edward Livingston
- Van Buren County, named for Secretary of State (later Vice President and then President) Martin Van Buren

== See also ==
- List of Michigan counties
