= Oneida Charter Township, Michigan =

- Charter township
- Location within the state of Michigan Oneida Charter Township (the United States)
- Coordinates: 42°43′43″N 84°46′1″W
- Country: United States
- State: Michigan
- County: Eaton

Area
  - Total: 32.7 sq mi (84.6 km^{2})
  - Land: 32.5 sq mi (84.3 km^{2})
  - Water: 0.12 sq mi (0.3 km^{2})
- Elevation: 876 ft (267 m)

Population (2020)
  - Total: 3,986
  - Density: 120/sq mi (46.3/km^{2})
- Time zone: Eastern
- FIPS code: 26-60700
- GNIS feature ID: 1626847
- Website: www.oneidatownship.org

Oneida Charter Township is a charter township of Eaton County in the U.S. state of Michigan. The population was 3,986 at the 2020 United States census, up from 3,865 in 2010.

== Geography ==
According to the US Census Bureau, the township has a total area of 32.7 square miles (84.6 km^{2}), of which 32.5 square miles (84.3 km^{2}) is land and 0.1 square miles (0.3 km^{2}), or 0.31%, is water.

== Communities ==
- Canada Settlement was an area in the township settled by a group of people from London, Ontario in 1836.
- Oneida Center

== Demographics ==
Historical population
Census	Pop.	Note	%±
1960	1,909		—
1970	2,635		38.0%
1980	3,378		28.2%
1990	3,228		−4.4%
2000	3,703		14.7%
2010	3,865		4.4%
2020	3,986		3.1%
U.S. Decennial Census

At the 2000 census, there were 3,703 people, 1,352 households and 1,050 families in the township. The population density was 113.9 inhabitants per square mile (44.0/km^{2}). There were 1,423 housing units at an average density of 43.8 per square mile (16.9/km^{2}). The racial makeup of the township was 96.81% White, 0.51% African American, 0.46% Native American, 0.30% Asian, 0.03% Pacific Islander, 0.70% from other races, and 1.19% from two or more races. Hispanic or Latino of any race were 2.40% of the population.

There were 1,352 households, of which 35.9% had children under the age of 18 living with them, 70.1% were married couples living together, 5.0% had a female householder with no husband present, and 22.3% were non-families. 18.9% of all households were made up of individuals, and 10.9% had someone living alone who was 65 years of age or older. The average household size was 2.74 and the average family size was 3.13.

26.5% of the population were under the age of 18, 6.7% from 18 to 24, 26.2% from 25 to 44, 28.4% from 45 to 64, and 12.2% who were 65 years of age or older. The median age was 40 years. For every 100 females, there were 99.2 males. For every 100 females age 18 and over, there were 95.8 males.

The median household income was $63,750 and the median family income was $71,891. Males had a median income of $53,813 versus $31,875 for females. The per capita income for the township was $26,787. About 1.9% of families and 2.7% of the population were below the poverty line, including 3.2% of those under age 18 and 0.9% of those age 65 or over.
