= Windsor Charter Township, Michigan =

- Charter township
- Flag

- Location within the state of Michigan
- Coordinates: 42°38′52″N 84°39′30″W
- Country: United States
- State: Michigan
- County: Eaton

Area
  - Total: 35.1 sq mi (90.8 km^{2})
  - Land: 34.5 sq mi (89.3 km^{2})
  - Water: 0.58 sq mi (1.5 km^{2})
- Elevation: 850 ft (260 m)

Population (2020)
  - Total: 7,140
  - Density: 207/sq mi (80.0/km^{2})
- Time zone: UTC-5 (Eastern (EST))
  - Summer (DST): UTC-4 (EDT)
- FIPS code: 26-87840
- GNIS feature ID: 1627279
- Website: https://www.windsortownship.com/

Windsor Charter Township is a charter township of Eaton County in the U.S. state of Michigan. It was organized as Windsor Township on March 16, 1842. The population was 7,140 at the 2020 census, up from 6,838 at the 2010 census.

== Communities ==
The village of Dimondale and the unincorporated community of West Windsor are within the township.

== Geography ==
According to the United States Census Bureau, the township has a total area of 35.1 square miles (90.8 km^{2}), of which 34.5 square miles (89.3 km^{2}) is land and 0.58 square miles (1.5 km^{2}), or 1.65%, is water.

== Demographics ==
Historical population
Census	Pop.	Note	%±
1960	3,200		—
1970	4,483		40.1%
1980	6,078		35.6%
1990	6,460		6.3%
2000	7,340		13.6%
2010	6,838		−6.8%
2020	7,140		4.4%
2021 (est.)	7,122		−0.3%
U.S. Decennial Census

As of the census of 2000, there were 7,340 people, 2,781 households, and 2,091 families residing in the township. The population density was 210.3 inhabitants per square mile (81.2/km^{2}). There were 2,910 housing units at an average density of 83.4 per square mile (32.2/km^{2}). The racial makeup of the township was 93.04% White, 3.02% African American, 0.50% Native American, 0.41% Asian, 0.07% Pacific Islander, 1.27% from other races, and 1.69% from two or more races. Hispanic or Latino of any race were 3.42% of the population.

There were 2,781 households, out of which 31.8% had children under the age of 18 living with them, 64.5% were married couples living together, 7.6% had a female householder with no husband present, and 24.8% were non-families. 20.8% of all households were made up of individuals, and 9.1% had someone living alone who was 65 years of age or older. The average household size was 2.57 and the average family size was 2.98.

In the township the population was spread out, with 24.2% under the age of 18, 6.1% from 18 to 24, 25.4% from 25 to 44, 29.4% from 45 to 64, and 14.9% who were 65 years of age or older. The median age was 42 years. For every 100 females, there were 95.2 males. For every 100 females age 18 and over, there were 91.5 males.

The median income for a household in the township was $57,793, and the median income for a family was $65,851. Males had a median income of $45,160 versus $31,828 for females. The per capita income for the township was $23,912. About 2.1% of families and 3.3% of the population were below the poverty line, including 3.1% of those under age 18 and 1.7% of those age 65 or over.
