= Business routes of Interstate 69 =

List of highways in Michigan

Business Loop Interstate 69
- I-69's business routes highlighted in green

Location
- Country: United States
- State: Michigan

Highway system
- Interstate Highway System; Main; Auxiliary; Suffixed; Business; Future; Michigan State Trunkline Highway System; Interstate; US; State; Byways
← I-69	→ M-69

There are currently four business routes of Interstate 69 (I-69) in the US state of Michigan. Designated Business Loop Interstate 69 (BL I-69), they are all former routings of I-69's predecessor highways, US Highway 27 (US 27), M-78 or M-21, in whole or in part. The BL I-69 in Coldwater and the one in Charlotte were both parts of US 27 before the freeway bypassed those two cities in 1967 and the early 1970s, respectively. The BL I-69 through Lansing and East Lansing was previously part of M-78 and Temporary I-69 until it was redesignated in 1987. Before 1984, the loop in Port Huron was originally part of M-21 and was initially a business spur numbered Business Spur Interstate 69 (BS I-69). It was later redesignated when it was extended to run concurrently with that city's BL I-94 which was originally part of I-94's predecessor, US 25. Each business loop follows streets through each city's downtown areas and connects to I-69 on both ends, giving traffic a route through the downtown and back to the freeway.

== Coldwater ==
Business Loop Interstate 69
- Location: Coldwater
- Length: 5.202 mi (8.372 km)
- Existed: 1967–present

Business Loop I-69 (BL I-69) is a business loop formed from part of the old US 27 and part of US 12 near and through Coldwater. At the southern end, it begins at exit 10 on I-69 where Fenn Road crosses the freeway. The business loop follows the two-lane Fenn Road west for about three-quarters of a mile (1.2 km), then curves north to merge with old US 27 (Angola Road). The highway runs northward through farmland south of Coldwater, and after approximately two miles (3.2 km), it enters the city limit at Garfield Road. Once in Coldwater, the business loop follows Clay Street through residential neighborhoods. After another half mile (0.8 km), the highway reaches a fork where Clay Street continues due north and Division Street branches to the northeast; BL I-69 follows the four-lane Division Street for about another mile (1.6 km) to the main intersection in the city known locally as "the Four Corners." This intersection is where old US 27 intersects US 12 (Chicago Street). BL I-69 turns eastward along the four-lane US 12 and continues from the Four Corners back to I-69 at exit 13.

In 1919, the Michigan State Highway Department (MSHD) (Note: The Michigan State Highway Department was reorganized into the Michigan Department of State Highways and Transportation on August 23, 1973. The name was shortened to its current form in 1978.) signposted the highway system for the first time, and the future US 27 corridor through Coldwater was part of the original M-29. On November 11, 1926, the United States Numbered Highway System was approved by the American Association of State Highway Officials (AASHO), (Note: AASHO was renamed the American Association of State Highway and Transportation Officials (AASHTO) on November 13, 1973.) and the new US 27 replaced M-29 in the area. In September 1967, the freeway bypassing Coldwater opened. At the same time, the old route through the city was redesignated as BL I-69.

Major intersections
The entire highway is in Branch County.

Location	mi	km	Destinations	Notes
Ovid–Coldwater township line	0.000	0.000	I-69 – Fort Wayne, Lansing	Southern terminus at exit 10 on I-69
Coldwater	3.734	6.009	US 12 west – Niles	Western end of US 12 concurrency
Coldwater	5.202	8.372	I-69 – Fort Wayne, Lansing US 12 east	Eastern end of US 12 concurrency; northern terminus at exit 13 on I-69
1.000 mi = 1.609 km; 1.000 km = 0.621 mi: Concurrency terminus

== Charlotte ==
Business Loop Interstate 69
- Location: Charlotte
- Length: 4.891 mi (7.871 km)
- Existed: 1974–present

Business Loop I-69 (BL I-69) is a business loop that took over the Business US 27 (Bus. US 27) route inside Charlotte. It is a surface street for the nearly five miles (8.0 km) of the loop. The trunkline starts just outside the city of Charlotte at exit 57 and follows Cochran Road The loop travels due north through rural areas south of town along a two-lane road. North of a crossing of the Battle Creek River, Cochrane Road widens to include a center turn lane. About 2 3/4 miles (4.4 km) north of the starting point, BL I-69 begins a 3/4-mile-long (1.2 km) concurrency with M-50 at Shepherd Street. North of Warren Avenue, BL I-69/M-50 widens to four lanes, two in each direction. The concurrency ends at Lawrence Avenue; M-50 continues north, and the business loop heads east on Lawrence Avenue for a few blocks. That intersection also marks the eastern terminus of M-79. From that point, BL I-69 follows Lawrence Avenue and then veers northeast onto Lansing Street to complete its loop at exit 61.

In 1919, the MSHD signposted the highway system for the first time, and the future US 27 corridor through Charlotte was part of the original M-29. On November 11, 1926, the United States Numbered Highway System was approved by the AASHO and the new US 27 replaced M-29 through Coldwater. By the end of the next year, M-78 was extended from downtown Charlotte along US 27 to run northeasterly toward Lansing. The highway through downtown Charlotte was first designated Bus. US 27 after the 1961 completion of a non-freeway bypass, a two-lane, limited-access highway east of the city. At that point I-69 only existed in the southern parts of Michigan. That freeway was not extended up to the city when the southernmost segment of I-69 was completed in 1967. By 1971, I-69 was completed to Charlotte and at the time US 27 was cosigned with I-69, the bypass being incorporated into I-69. For three years the business loop in Charlotte was not signed as BL I-69, but it was so designated in 1974 and Bus. US 27 was decommissioned in and near Charlotte.

Major intersections
The entire highway is in Eaton County.

Location	mi	km	Destinations	Notes
Carmel–Eaton township line	0.000	0.000	I-69 – Fort Wayne, Lansing	Southern terminus at exit 57 on I-69
Charlotte	2.806	4.516	M-50 east (Shepherd Street) – Eaton Rapids	Southern end of M-50 concurrency
Charlotte	3.528	5.678	M-50 west (Cochran Avenue) – Grand Rapids M-79 west (Lawrence Avenue) – Hastings	Northern end of M-50 concurrency; eastern terminus of M-79
Charlotte	4.891	7.871	I-69 – Fort Wayne, Lansing	Northern terminus at exit 61 on I-69
1.000 mi = 1.609 km; 1.000 km = 0.621 mi: Concurrency terminus

== Lansing ==
Business Loop Interstate 69
- Location: Lansing–East Lansing
- Length: 14.591 mi (23.482 km)
- Existed: 1987–present

Business Loop I-69, or BL I-69, is a business loop in the Lansing area. It is the longest business route in the state of Michigan at a length of over 14 1/2 miles (23.3 km). Beginning at exit 93 on I-96/I-69 in Eaton County west of the city, the business loop runs concurrently with M-43 east along Saginaw Highway. The roadway has five total lanes, two in each direction separated by a center turn lane, as it travels through commercial areas in Delta Township and past the Lansing Mall. BL I-69/M-43 continues east on Saginaw Highway and crosses into Ingham County at Waverly Road. From the county line eastward, the highway is known as Saginaw Street, and it passes through residential neighborhoods. Within the city of Lansing, BL I-69 utilizes a one-way pair of three-to-four-lane streets: Saginaw Street eastbound and Oakland Street westbound. One block separates the two directions of BL I-69/M-43 until the intersection with Martin Luther King Jr. Boulevard near the St. Lawrence Campus of the Sparrow Hospital; east of this intersection two blocks separate the two directions of the highway. The business loop crosses the Grand River in downtown Lansing near the campus of Lansing Community College north of the Michigan State Capitol.

On the eastern side of the river just north of Cooley Law School Stadium, BL I-69/M-43 intersects the one-way pair of Cedar and Larch streets that carries the two directions of BL I-96. BL I-69/M-43 continues through residential areas east of the other business loop. Near Marshall Park between Maryland Avenue and Marshall Street, Oakland Avenue ends and Grand River Avenue takes over for the westbound direction of BL I-69/M-43. Further east near the interchange with US 127, Grand River Avenue and Saginaw Street cross each other. M-43 departs to the southeast via Grand River Avenue while BL I-69 turns northeasterly via the four-lane Saginaw Street. East of this intersection, BL I-69 crosses into East Lansing and runs through residential areas on the north side of the city. The roadway turns due east at Abbot Road. At an intersection with Haslett Road, Saginaw Street widens into a four-lane divided highway with a grassy median. Along this section, it resumes the Saginaw Highway name and turns northeasterly again, crossing into Meridian Township. The major intersections along Saginaw Highway have Michigan left turns as well. Before the business loop ends, it crosses into Clinton County. The eastern end of BL I-69 is located at exit 94 on I-69 in Bath Township.

In 1919, the MSHD signposted the highway system for the first time, and the east–west highways through Lansing were part of the original M-29 through downtown and the original M-39 north of downtown. The north–south highway in Lansing was the original M-14. On November 11, 1926, the United States Numbered Highway System was approved by the AASHO, and the new US 27 replaced M-29 and M-14 in the area. By the end of the next year, M-78 was extended from Charlotte along US 27 to through downtown Lansing. M-78 separated from US 27 in downtown Lansing and continued northeasterly through the northern part of East Lansing. M-39 was replaced with an extended M-43 in 1938.

As the freeways in the Lansing area were completed in the 1960s through the 1980s, the highways through downtown changed designations. The section of I-96 west of Lansing opened in December 1962. In 1973, M-78 was converted to a freeway near the Flint area, and from Olivet southwest of Lansing to the new freeway, the old highway was redesignated Temporary I-69 (Temp. I-69). Additional segments of I-69 north of Lansing were finished in 1984 and 1987. I-69 was routed over I-96 and the new freeway north of Lansing, and the business loop was designated along M-43 and the former Temp. I-69 in 1987 after that second segment opened.

Major intersections

County	Location	mi	km	Destinations	Notes
Eaton	Delta Township	0.000	0.000	I-96 / I-69 – Fort Wayne M-43 west – Hastings	Western end of M-43 concurrency; western terminus at exit 93 on I-96/I-69
Ingham	Lansing	4.329	6.967	Oakland Avenue	Western end of one-way pairing
Ingham	Lansing	6.402	10.303	BL I-96 east (Cedar Street)	Eastbound direction for BL I-96
Ingham	Lansing	6.497	10.456	BL I-96 west (Larch Street)	Westbound direction for BL I-96
Ingham	Lansing Township	8.238– 8.256	13.258– 13.287	US 127 – Jackson, Clare	Exit 78 on US 127
Ingham	Lansing	8.449– 8.515	13.597– 13.704	M-43 (Grand River Avenue)	Eastern end of M-43 concurrency; eastern end of one-way pairing with Oakland and Grand River avenues
Ingham	East Lansing	10.790	17.365	Western end of divided highway	
Clinton	Bath Township	14.147	22.767	Old M-78	Eastern end of divided highway; western end of freeway
Clinton	Bath Township	14.591	23.482	I-69 – Lansing, Flint	Eastern terminus at exit 94 on I-69
1.000 mi = 1.609 km; 1.000 km = 0.621 mi: Concurrency terminus

== Port Huron ==
Business Loop Interstate 69
- Location: Port Huron
- Length: 3.077 mi (4.952 km)
- Existed: 1984–present

Business Loop I-69 (BL I-69) is a business loop running through downtown Port Huron. The first mile or so (1.7 km) of BL I-69 runs southeasterly from I-69 at the interchange where it meets I-94. The business loop follows a four-lane freeway until the intersection with 32nd Street. A bit further east, it turns due east–west into a one-way pair of three-lane surface streets, eastbound along Oak Street and westbound along Griswold Street, that run through residential areas on the west and south sides of Port Huron. East of 23rd Street. the two halves of BL I-69 narrow to two lanes each. In downtown Port Huron, BL I-69 turns northerly running concurrently with BL I-94 on four-lane Military Avenue parallel to the St. Clair River. North of the crossing of the Black River, BL I-69/BL I-94 continues northward on Huron Avenue through downtown. At the intersection with Glenwood Avenue, the business loop turns northwesterly onto Pine Grove Avenue through residential areas on the north side of the city. The street is five lanes, two in each direction with a center turn lane, and passes under the I-94/I-69 freeway at the toll and customs plazas for the Blue Water Bridge; north of the freeway, there is a ramp to connect to the eastbound direction of the freeway and the bridge. The business loop continues along Pine Grove Avenue, intersecting the southern end of M-25 at Hancock Street. At that intersection, the business loop turns westward for a block. It then turns south along the connector to terminate at westbound I-94/I-69 west of the Blue Water Bridge toll plaza.

In 1919, the MSHD signposted the highway system for the first time, and the east–west highway through Port Huron was part of the original M-19, and the north–south highway was part of the original M-27. M-21 was extended over M-19 into Port Huron by 1924. On November 11, 1926, the United States Numbered Highway System was approved by the AASHO, and the new US 25 replaced M-27 in the area. In 1964, a section of I-94 in the Port Huron area was completed. The former route of US 25 through downtown was redesignated Bus. US 25 when the main highway was shifted out to the freeway. The first freeway segment of M-21 was built into the Port Huron area in 1966; the freeway directly tied into the western end of the old route into downtown. In 1973, US 25 was decommissioned in the state, and the former Bus. US 25 was renumbered BL I-94. The remaining segment of freeway along the M-21 corridor opened in 1984 as I-69; after this freeway opened, M-21 was shortened to Flint, and the former M-21 in Port Huron became Business Spur I-69. To connect back to I-69, the business route was extended northward along BL I-94 when that highway was designated through downtown in 1986.

Major intersections
The entire highway is in St. Clair County.

Location	mi	km	Destinations	Notes
Port Huron Township	0.000	0.000	I-94 west / I-69 west – Detroit, Flint	Eastern terminus at exit 271 on I-94 and exit 198 on I-69; eastbound entrance and westbound exit
Port Huron Township	1.104	1.777	32nd Street	Eastern end of freeway
Port Huron Township	1.207	1.942	Griswold Street	Western end of one-way pairing
Port Huron	2.940	4.731	BL I-94 west (Military Street)	Southern end of BL I-94 concurrency
Port Huron	2.348	3.779	I-94 east / I-69 east – Blue Water Bridge	Part of exit 275 on I-94/I-69
Port Huron	2.625	4.225	M-25 north (Pine Grove Avenue)	Southern terminus of M-25
Port Huron	3.077	4.952	I-94 west / I-69 west – Detroit, Flint BL I-94 south	Northern end of BL I-94 concurrency; western terminus at exit 275 on I-94/I-69
1.000 mi = 1.609 km; 1.000 km = 0.621 mi: Concurrency terminus
