= U.S. Route 27 in Michigan =

Former U.S. Highway in Michigan

US Highway 27
- US 27 highlighted in red

Route information
- Maintained by MDOT
- Length: 218.195 mi (351.151 km)
- Existed: November 26, 1926–April 16, 1999
- History: Signs were removed in 2002

Major junctions
- South end: I-69 / US 27 at Indiana state line
- US 12 near Coldwater I-94 in Marshall; I-96 near Lansing; I-69 / US 127 near East Lansing US 10 near Clare
- North end: I-75 near Grayling

Location
- Country: United States
- State: Michigan
- Counties: Branch, Calhoun, Eaton, Clinton, Gratiot, Isabella, Clare, Roscommon, Crawford

Highway system
- United States Numbered Highway System; List; Special; Divided; Michigan State Trunkline Highway System; Interstate; US; State; Byways
| ← M-26 | → M-27 |

US Highway 27 (US 27) is a part of the US Highway System that now runs from Miami, Florida, to Fort Wayne, Indiana. In the US state of Michigan, it was a north–south state trunkline highway that entered the state south of Kinderhook and ended south of Grayling. Its route consisted of a freeway concurrency with Interstate 69 (I-69) from the state line north to the Lansing area before it followed its own freeway facility northward to St. Johns. From there north to Ithaca, US 27 was an expressway before continuing as a freeway to a terminus south of Grayling.

Created with the rest of the US Highway System on November 11, 1926, US 27 replaced a pair of state highways between the state line and the Cheboygan area. For a time, US 27 even extended from Cheboygan to St. Ignace over the Mackinac Bridge. The highway was converted into a series of freeways starting in the late 1950s. The northernmost section between Grayling and Mackinaw City, bypassing Cheboygan, became part of I-75, and US 27 was truncated to Grayling. Starting in the 1960s, the southern sections were included in I-69. The last section of Interstate in Michigan was completed in 1992 when I-69/US 27 opened southwest of Lansing. In the 1990s, a bypass of St. Johns north of Lansing was built, the last freeway segment of US 27 to open under that designation. On April 16, 1999, the American Association of State Highway and Transportation Officials (AASHTO) approved the removal of the US 27 designation from the state of Michigan; this change was put into place when the highway number was removed from signage in 2002. Former segments of US 27 from its pre-freeway configuration are still state highways in the form of M-27 between Indian River and Cheboygan or the various business routes in the state that previously bore Business US 27 (Bus. US 27) designations.

== Route description ==
=== Southern Michigan ===
I-69/US 27 in Michigan began at the Indiana state line southeast of Kinderhook, just north of an interchange with the Indiana Toll Road (I-80/I-90). From there, I-69/US 27 ran northward through a mixture of Southern Michigan farmland and woodland in Branch County. A few miles north of the state line, the freeway passes Coldwater Lake State Park and its namesake body of water; north of the lake, there is a welcome center for the northbound lanes. I-69/US 27 curved around the east side of Coldwater, connecting to the city's business loop on the south of town. The freeway intersects the northern end of the business loop immediately east of downtown at an interchange that also features US 12 (Chicago Road). A third interchange, some three miles (4.8 km) further north, features a distribution center for Walmart stores in the region. Further north, the freeway curves around to the northwest into Calhoun County and crosses over the St. Joseph River. I-69/US 27 turned back northward and bypassed Tekonsha to the town's west, intersecting M-60 in the process.

Curving around Nottawa Lake, I-69/US 27 continued northward through southern Calhoun County. It passed through an interchange that marked the southern terminus of M-227, a highway that runs northward into Marshall. The freeway crosses the Kalamazoo River and through an interchange with M-96 west of downtown Marshall. From that interchange northward, the BL I-94 designation was overlaid on I-69/US 27; the business loop ends at the cloverleaf interchange with I-94 northwest of Marshall. North of I-94, I-69/US 27 had one more interchange before crossing into Eaton County.

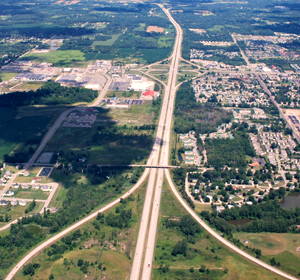
Aerial view looking north from the I-496 interchange along I-96/I-69/Former US 27 west of Lansing

In southern Eaton County, the freeway parallels the Battle Creek River north of the junction with M-78. Near Olivet, I-69/US 27 began to turn in a northeasterly direction. As it continued in that direction, it ran to the north side of Olivet. On the south side of Charlotte, I-69/US 27 turned northward, traversing an area to the east of downtown and crossing the former routing of US 27, which is now part of the business loop for the city. Further north, the freeway has a junction with M-50, a bridge over the Battle Creek River, and an interchange with the northern end of the business loop next to Fitch H. Beach Airport. North of the airport, I-69/US 27 turned northeasterly again and paralleled Lansing Road, the former route of US 27/M-78. The freeway meets the southern end of M-100 near Potterville and continues onto the Lansing–East Lansing metropolitan area. Southwest of the state's capital city, I-69/US 27 crossed over Lansing Road near Lansing Delta Township Assembly, a factory for General Motors; northeast of the complex, I-69/US 27 merged into I-96. The combined I-96/I-69/US 27 ran northward through the suburban edges of the Lansing area, intersecting the western ends of I-496 and the BL I-69 for Lansing. The freeway enters Clinton County, and just north of a crossing of the Grand River, I-69/US 27 turned eastward to separate from I-96. As a part of the larger interchange with I-96, I-69/US 27 crossed BL I-96 (Grand River Avenue) without any connections.

=== Mid-Michigan to Grayling ===
After leaving the I-96 concurrency, I-69 changes cardinal orientation and is signed as east–west from that point on. The freeway continues parallel to the Looking Glass River through suburban areas north of Capital Region International Airport. North of East Lansing, I-69/US 27 met US 127 at a cloverleaf interchange, and US 27 turned northward to separate from I-69. The US 27 freeway ran through farmland and crossed the Looking Glass River. At Price Road, US 27 met its southernmost business loop, the Bus. US 27 for St. Johns. The freeway continues due north and intersects M-21 east of town before it turns northwesterly to round the northern side of St. Johns. North of downtown, US 27 met the northern end of the business loop and the freeway ends. Continuing northward as an expressway, the highway has four lanes divided by a median with at-grade intersections at the cross roads.

In Gratiot County, US 27 was named Bagley Road. North of Wilson Road, the expressway crosses the Maple River on a causeway through a wetland area in the Maple River State Game Area. North of the river, the expressway has an interchange with M-57 then crosses a branch line of the Great Lakes Central Railroad About six miles (9.7 km) further north, US 27 turned to the northwest, separating from Bagley Road. The expressway transitions back to a full freeway as the trunkline turns north and curves around the east side of Ithaca, meeting the southern end of Ithaca's business loop at Center Road, and the opposite end north of town.

Further north, US 27 angled northwesterly between Alma and St. Louis. Each city has its own business loop, accessible on the south side through a pair of partial interchanges at Lincoln and State roads. The freeway crosses the Pine River before intersecting M-46 and the two business loops at another pair of interchanges north of downtown Alma. After US 27 crossed into Isabella County, it turned northwesterly near Shepherd. After a few miles, a short freeway spur carrying the Bus. US 27 for Mount Pleasant splits off and the main freeway turns back to the north. The two highways continue in parallel through town before turning to converge north of Mount Pleasant by the airport. After the freeway stub at the northern end of the business loop merges in, the main freeway crosses the Chippewa River.

US 27 continued through northern Isabella County to pass east of Rosebush. South of the Clare County line in Clare, US 27 met the southern end of Clare's Bus. US 27. The freeway turns northeasterly, crosses Bus. US 10 and the county line before merging with US 10. US 27/US 10 curved around Lake Shamrock on the northern end of town before meeting the northern end of Bus. US 27/Bus. US 10. The freeway continues north, past a welcome center in the median, and US 10 splits off to the west.

North of Clare, US 27 ran through forest, where it passed to the east of Harrison. On the east side of that town, the freeway crosses between Little Long and Sutherland lakes before meeting the northern end of the Harrison business loop. The freeway then crosses into Roscommon County. East of the community of Houghton Lake Heights and the city of Houghton Lake, US 27 intersected M-55. North of that interchange, the freeway parallels the western shore of Houghton Lake and crosses the Muskegon River. The freeway then turns a bit northeasterly toward Higgins Lake and follows that lake's western shore before crossing into Crawford County. Once across the county line, US 27 curved around to the northeast for about 5 1/2 miles (8.9 km) before terminating at I-75 south of Grayling.

== History ==
=== Predecessor highways ===
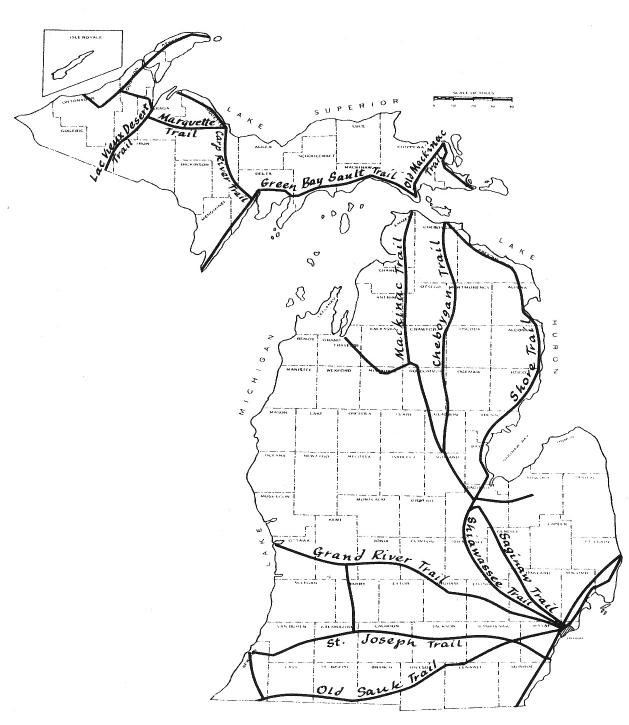
Map of the pre-statehood Indian trails

The first major overland transportation corridors in the future state of Michigan were the Indian trails. Only one of these followed part of the path of US 27; the Mackinac Trail roughly paralleled the route of US 27 from Grayling north.

The State Trunkline Highway System was created on May 13, 1913, by an act of the Michigan Legislature; at the time, no one of the system's divisions corresponded to US 27. Division 3 followed a course from Lansing northward to an intersection with Division 2. Combined with the northernmost sections of Division 2 to the Straits of Mackinac, these highways roughly described the future route of US 27. In 1919, the Michigan State Highway Department (MSHD) (Note: The Michigan State Highway Department was reorganized into the Michigan Department of State Highways and Transportation on August 23, 1973. The name was shortened to its current form in 1978.) signposted the highway system for the first time, and two different highways followed sections of the future US 27 corridor. The original M-29 ran from the Indiana state line north to Lansing. The second highway was M-14 from Lansing north to Cheboygan.

=== United States Numbered Highways era ===
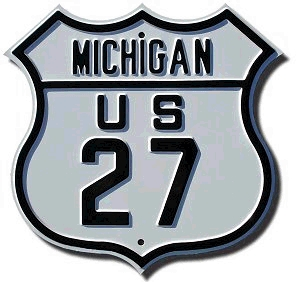
The US 27 marker originally used in Michigan

On November 11, 1926, the United States Numbered Highway System was approved by the American Association of State Highway Officials (AASHO), (Note: AASHO was renamed the American Association of State Highway and Transportation Officials (AASHTO) on November 13, 1973.) and the new US 27 replaced M-29 from the state line northward to Lansing; from Lansing northward, US 27 replaced M-14 to Cheboygan. By the end of the next year, M-78 was extended from Charlotte along US 27 to run north and east of Lansing to a junction with M-47 near Pittsburg. In 1929, the route of US 27/M-18 was realigned south of Roscommon on the east side of Higgins Lake. The same year, another realignment moved US 27 to run due north from the Clinton–Gratiot county line to M-43 at Ithaca, and a third change rounded a corner near Shepherd in Isabella County.

When a new roadway was built in the St. Louis area in 1930, the former routing into Alma was redesignated US 27A; another US 27A was created in Shepherd around the same time. By the middle of 1936, the US 27/M-78 routing through Lansing was split into two. The mainline was restricted to cars only and moved to run along Capitol Avenue. The former routing was restricted to trucks only and designated as a truck route. By the end of the year, another realignment straightened out a series of turns from the county line northward to Wolverine in Cheboygan County. The following year, US 27 was extended to follow US 23 between Cheboygan and Mackinaw City. That year, the last section of the highway was also paved southwest of Houghton Lake. In 1938, the route of US 27 on the north side of downtown Lansing was realigned on an extended Larch Street. The US 27A loop into Shepherd was removed the next year.

In the latter half of 1940, US 23 was rerouted to follow the Lake Huron shoreline northwest of Alpena; after this change was completed, US 27's concurrency with US 23 was shortened to start in downtown Cheboygan instead of south of town. Later in the decade, US 27 was rerouted to run to the west of Houghton and Higgins lakes in 1949. The next year, the truck route designation in Lansing was decommissioned when the mainline was rerouted to replace it. In the early 1950s, the highway was rerouted to the south of St. Johns, and by early 1952 a business loop was created for the city; this four-lane divided highway extended as far south as the DeWitt area. By the end of 1952, a four-lane divided highway segment opened southwest of Lansing to bypass Millett.

=== Conversion to freeways ===
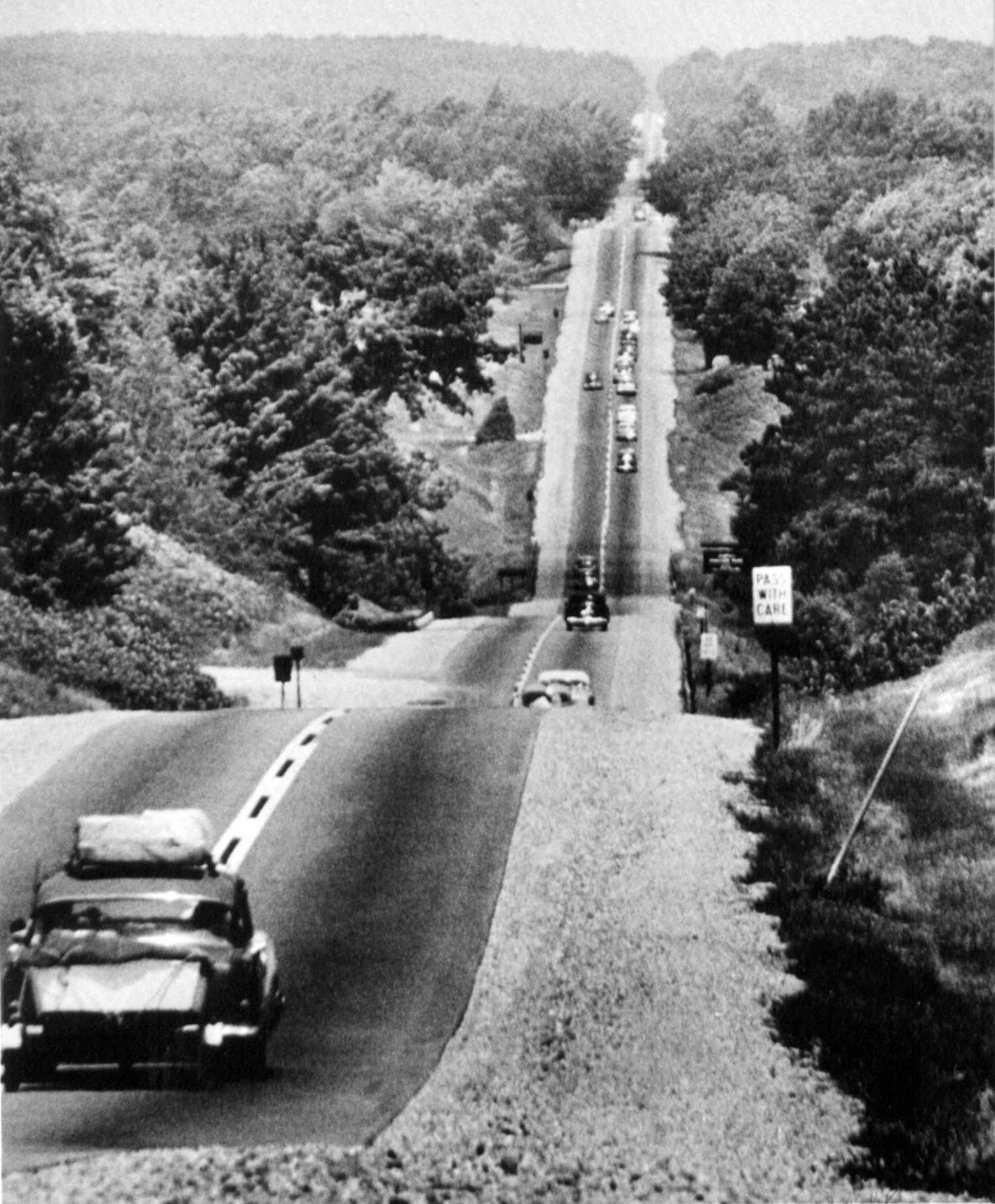
US 27 before relocation and conversion to a freeway near Clare

The first planning maps from 1947 for what later became the Interstate Highway System did not include a highway along US 27's route; instead a highway further west connecting South Bend, Indiana, with Kalamazoo was included. This alternative highway was maintained on the 1955 plan for the "National System of Interstate and Defense Highways", and numbered I-67 in August 1957. By June 1958, this freeway had been shifted further east and renumbered I-69, connecting Indianapolis, Indiana, with Marshall; no connections north and east to Lansing were planned as part of the Interstate Highway System.

The Mackinac Bridge was opened to traffic on November 1, 1957; a new section of freeway and an interchange connected US 2 to the bridge on the northern end, and a new approach road connected to U.S. Route 31 in Michigan and US 27 in Mackinaw City on the southern end. The US 27 designation was initially extended across the bridge from Mackinaw City to St. Ignace. In November 1960, sections of I-75 freeway opened from Indian River north to the southern Mackinac Bridge approaches in Mackinaw City, and US 27 was removed from the bridge.

In 1961, the MSHD had proposed that the section of US 27 south of Lansing be built as an electronic highway under a bid through General Motors; the testing for such a roadway was ultimately done at Ohio State University instead. That October, the first segment of I-75 near Grayling opened, connecting M-18 with the city. By the end of the year, the former segment of US 27 between Grayling and Gaylord was turned back to local control, and the section of highway between Indian River and Cheboygan was redesignated M-27. After this individual segment of freeway was completed, there was a gap between Gaylord and Indian River that was designated "TO I-75" on maps along the former segment of US 27, and US 27 was truncated to about five miles (8.0 km) south of Grayling. Also by the end of the same year, the highway was shifted to follow a new freeway routing from the southwest of Ithaca to Grayling, bypassing Ithaca, St. Louis, Mount Pleasant, Clare and Harrison. The old route was turned over to local control except through the aforementioned cities where it was reused for business loops. The US 27A through Alma was also bypassed by the new freeway, and it was redesignated Bus. US 27 as well. Another non-freeway bypass was built around Charlotte, and the former route was redesignated Bus. US 27.

In August 1962, the section of I-75 between Gaylord and Vanderbilt was completed. On December 12, 1962, I-96 was completed around the Lansing area, and M-78 was rerouted to follow it. The route of US 27/M-78 through downtown Lansing became US 27/Bus. M-78. On October 11, 1967, the first segment of I-69/US 27 was scheduled to open between the Indiana state line and Tekonsha. By the end of the year, the freeway was extended north to Marshall. The former route of US 27 in Coldwater was redesignated as a Business Loop I-69 (BL I-69) as well.

The MSHD requested additional Interstate Highway mileage in 1968 under the Federal-Aid Highway Act of 1968 including an extension of I-69 from Marshall to Port Huron; this extension was approved as far as I-75/US 23 in Flint on December 13, 1968. This extension encompassed the US 27 corridor between Marshall and Lansing.

In 1970, the I-69/US 27 freeway was extended from Marshall to just south of Olivet. The next year, the freeway was extended north to, and incorporated, the previous Charlotte bypass. Bus. US 27 through Charlotte remains unchanged. In 1973, the M-78 concurrency from Olivet northeasterly along US 27 was removed, and the connection along US 27 northeast of the existing I-69 freeway was designated TEMP I-69. The following year, Bus. US 27 in Charlotte was renumbered as a BL I-69. In the middle of 1974, Indiana and Michigan petitioned AASHTO to decommission the US 27 designation north of Fort Wayne, Indiana, including the entire length in Michigan; this request was denied.

A northern freeway bypass of the Lansing area opened in 1984. MDOT rerouted US 27 to follow I-96 around the west side of the city and over the new freeway to reconnect with the exiting routing north of Lansing. The former US 27 through downtown Lansing was redesignated Bus. US 27 at that time. Three years later in January 1987, MDOT dropped a proposal to reroute US 27 south of Lansing to the Jackson area, and from there west along M-60 to reconnect with I-69/US 27 at Tekonsha. Another segment of freeway opened later that year in Clinton County between US 127 near DeWitt and TEMP I-69 near Bath.

In 1991, MDOT and the Indiana Department of Transportation petitioned AASHTO to remove the US 27 designation from its concurrency with I-69 in the two states; this request was denied by the association's Special Committee on U.S. Route Numbering at its October 11, 1991, meeting because it would have resulted in a section of US 27 north of Lansing disconnected from the remainder of the highway south of Fort Wayne. The final segment of I-69/US 27 to be completed was located southwest of Lansing. It opened on October 17, 1992, when the ribbon was cut by Governor John Engler. This Interstate Highway segment was the last in the state and completed Michigan's portion of the Interstate Highway System. At the time it was complete, I-69 was concurrent with US 27 from the state line north to the DeWitt area (exit 87) and then concurrent with US 127 to exit 89.

A few years later, the statutory definition of the I-73 corridor was amended in 1995 to have a branch that would encompass the section of US 27 north of Lansing. This new Interstate was to follow US 223 and US 127 between Toledo, Ohio, and Lansing before continuing north to I-75 near Grayling. From Grayling northward, the I-73 corridor was defined to follow I-75 to Sault Ste. Marie. (Note: The original defined alignment of I-73 would have simply run along I-75 to Detroit.)

The St. Johns Bypass on US 27 opened on August 31, 1998; US 27 was extended along I-69 about two miles (3.2 km) to connect to the bypass, and US 127 was removed from its short concurrency with I-69. After this opening, US 27 was a full freeway in Michigan from the state line north to St. Johns and from Ithaca to the Grayling area. The last signalized intersection on US 27 in the state was removed in 2000 when the junction with M-57 was converted to an interchange in southern Gratiot County.

=== Decommissioning in Michigan ===

The previous year, MDOT petitioned AASHTO to decommission the US 27 designation in the state; the change was approved by AASHTO on April 16, 1999. The department considered three options to build the southern segments of I-73 in 2000; MDOT abandoned further study of these southern alignments after June 12, 2001, diverting remaining funding to safety improvement projects along the corridor. The department stated there was a "lack of need" for sections of the proposed freeway, and the project website was closed down in 2002.

The approved removal of US 27 was finally done in the middle of 2002. MDOT's stated reason for the modification was to "reduce confusion along the US 27/US 127 corridor". After US 27's signage was removed, the highway north of the Lansing area was renumbered US 127, and the US 27 designation was removed from I-69. All of the business loops were updated to reflect their new parent highway.

On August 19, 2010, the Michigan House of Representatives passed a resolution recognizing "Old US 27" as a historic road in the state. According to press reports in 2011, a group advocating on behalf of I-73 is working to revive the freeway project in Michigan. According to an MDOT spokesman, "to my knowledge, we’re not taking that issue up again."

== Exit list ==
At the time the US 27 designation was decommissioned in Michigan, only the interchanges along the section concurrent with I-69 used exit numbers.

| County | Location | mi | km | Exit | Destinations | Notes |
|---|---|---|---|---|---|---|
| Branch | Kinderhook Township | 0.000 | 0.000 | | I-69 south / US 27 south – Fort Wayne | Indiana state line |
| Branch | Kinderhook Township | 2.617 | 4.212 | 3 | Copeland Road – Kinderhook | |
| Branch | Ovid–Coldwater township line | 9.701 | 15.612 | 10 | BL I-69 north (Fenn Road) – Coldwater | |
| Branch | Coldwater | 12.607 | 20.289 | 13 | BL I-69 south / US 12 – Quincy, Coldwater | |
| Branch | Coldwater–Girard township line | 16.024 | 25.788 | 16 | Jonesville Road | |
| Calhoun | Tekonsha Township | 22.546 | 36.284 | 23 | Tekonsha, Girard | Exit for Old US 27 which follows Main Street in Tekonsha and Marshall Road in Branch County |
| Calhoun | Tekonsha Township | 24.627 | 39.633 | 25 | M-60 – Three Rivers, Jackson | |
| Calhoun | Fredonia Township | 31.532 | 50.746 | 32 | M-227 (F Drive South) | |
| Calhoun | Marshall | 36.207– 36.217 | 58.270– 58.286 | 36 | BL I-94 east (Michigan Avenue) – Marshall M-96 west (Michigan Avenue) | Southern end of BL I-94 concurrency |
| Calhoun | Marshall Township | 38.132– 38.150 | 61.368– 61.396 | 38 | I-94 – Detroit, Chicago BL I-94 east | Northern end of BL I-94 concurrency; exit 108 on I-94 |
| Calhoun | Convis Township | 41.896 | 67.425 | 42 | N Drive North | |
| Eaton | Walton Township | 48.229 | 77.617 | 48 | M-78 – Bellevue, Olivet | |
| Eaton | Walton Township | 50.406 | 81.121 | 51 | Ainger Road – Olivet | |
| Eaton | Carmel–Eaton township line | 56.676 | 91.211 | 57 | BL I-69 north (Cochran Road) – Charlotte | |
| Eaton | Charlotte | 59.549 | 95.835 | 60 | M-50 – Charlotte, Eaton Rapids | |
| Eaton | Charlotte | 61.108 | 98.344 | 61 | BL I-69 south (Lansing Road) – Charlotte | |
| Eaton | Potterville | 66.388 | 106.841 | 66 | M-100 north (Hartel Road) – Potterville, Grand Ledge | |
| Eaton | Windsor Township | 70.270 | 113.089 | 70 | Lansing Road | |
| Eaton | Delta Charter Township | 72.720– 72.743 | 117.031– 117.069 | 72 | I-96 east – Detroit | Southern end of I-96 concurrency; concurrency uses I-96 exit numbers; signed as exit 97 southbound |
| Eaton | Delta Charter Township | 74.877 | 120.503 | 95 | I-496 east – Downtown Lansing | Western terminus of I-496 |
| Eaton | Delta Charter Township | 76.341 | 122.859 | 93 | BL I-69 east / M-43 (Saginaw Highway) – Grand Ledge | Signed as exits 93B (east) and 93A (west) |
| Clinton | Watertown Township | 78.653– 80.292 | 126.580– 129.217 | 91 | I-96 west – Grand Rapids | Northern end of I-96 concurrency; I-69 changes between north–south and east–west signage; signed on I-69 westbound as exit 81 with access to and eastbound entrance from Frances Road |
| Clinton | DeWitt Township | 83.081 | 133.706 | 84 | Airport Road | |
| Clinton | DeWitt Township | 84.820 | 136.505 | 85 | DeWitt | Connects to DeWitt Road |
| Clinton | DeWitt Township | 86.315 | 138.911 | 87 | Old US 27 | |
| Clinton | DeWitt Township | 88.227– 88.256 | 141.988– 142.034 | 89 | I-69 east – Flint US 127 south – Lansing, Jackson | Northern end of I-69 concurrency; signed as exits 89A (US 127 south) and 89B (US 27 north) |
| Clinton | DeWitt–Olive township line | 91.777 | 147.701 | | Round Lake Road – DeWitt | |
| Clinton | Olive Township | 96.787 | 155.764 | | Bus. US 27 north (Price Road) – St. Johns | Signed as Price Road only southbound |
| Clinton | Bingham Township | 101.807 | 163.842 | | M-21 – Ionia, Owosso | |
| Clinton | Bingham Township | 105.257 | 169.395 | | Bus. US 27 south (Old US 27) – St. Johns | Signed as Old US 27 only northbound |
| Clinton | Greenbush Township | 106.142 | 170.819 | | Northern end of freeway; southern end of expressway | |
| Gratiot | Washington Township | 115.392 | 185.705 | | M-57 (Cleveland Avenue) – Greenville, Chesaning | |
| Gratiot | North Star Township | 121.760 | 195.954 | | Bagley Road north | Northern end of expressway; southern end of freeway |
| Gratiot | Ithaca | 123.717 | 199.103 | | Bus. US 27 north (Washington Road) – Ithaca | Signed only as Washington Road southbound |
| Gratiot | Emerson Township | 125.028 | 201.213 | | Bus. US 27 (Polk Road) – Ithaca | Signed only as Polk Road northbound |
| Gratiot | Emerson–Bethany township line | 129.053 | 207.691 | | Bus. US 27 north (Lincoln Road) – Alma | Northbound exit and southbound entrance; southern terminus of business loop through Alma |
| Gratiot | Bethany–Pine River township line | 129.373 | 208.206 | | Bus. US 27 north (State Road) – St. Louis | Southern terminus of business loop through St. Louis |
| Gratiot | Pine River Township | 131.543 | 211.698 | | Bus. US 27 south / M-46 – St. Louis | Northern terminus of business loop for St. Louis; signed as M-46 only northbound |
| Gratiot | Pine River Township | 133.010 | 214.059 | | Bus. US 27 – Alma | Southbound exit and northbound entrance; northern terminus of business loop for Alma |
| Isabella | Coe Township | 141.024 | 226.956 | | Wright Avenue, Blanchard Road – Shepherd | |
| Isabella | Union Charter Township | 145.297 | 233.833 | | Bus. US 27 north – Mt. Pleasant | Northbound exit and southbound entrance |
| Isabella | Union Charter Township | 148.713 | 239.330 | | M-20 (Pickard Street) – Big Rapids, Midland | |
| Isabella | Union Charter Township | 150.150 | 241.643 | | Bus. US 27 south – Mt. Pleasant | Southbound exit and northbound entrance |
| Isabella | Rosebush | 155.249 | 249.849 | | Rosebush | Connects to Rosebush Road |
| Isabella | Vernon Township | 162.158 | 260.968 | | Bus. US 27 north to US 10 east – Clare | Northbound entrance and southbound exit; access to eastbound US 10 via Bus. US 10 |
| Clare | Clare | 164.065– 164.312 | 264.037– 264.435 | | US 10 east – Midland | South end of US 10 concurrency; southbound exit and northbound entrance |
| Clare | Clare | 165.787 | 266.808 | | Bus. US 27 south / Bus. US 10 east – Clare | Signed as Old 27 only southbound |
| Clare | Clare | 165.911– 166.589 | 267.008– 268.099 | | Michigan Welcome Center | |
| Clare | Clare | 168.369 | 270.964 | | US 10 west to M-115 – Reed City, Cadillac | Northern end of US 10 concurrency |
| Clare | Hatton Township | 173.830 | 279.752 | | Mannsiding Road – Lake George | |
| Clare | Hayes Township | 176.201 | 283.568 | | Bus. US 27 north / M-61 – Harrison | Signed as M-61 only southbound |
| Clare | Hayes Township | 182.162 | 293.161 | | Bus. US 27 south – Harrison | Signed as Old 27 only northbound |
| Roscommon | Roscommon Township | 195.939 | 315.333 | | Snow Bowl Road | |
| Roscommon | Houghton Lake Heights | 200.555 | 322.762 | | M-55 – Lake City, West Branch | |
| Roscommon | Lyon Township | 207.596 | 334.093 | | West Higgins Lake Road | |
| Crawford | Beaver Creek Township | 212.276 | 341.625 | | Military Road – Camp Grayling, Roscommon | Signed only as Military Road southbound |
| Crawford | Beaver Creek Township | 217.719– 218.195 | 350.385– 351.151 | | I-75 north – Mackinac Bridge | Exit 249 on I-75; northbound exit to I-75 northbound and southbound entrance from I-75 southbound |
1.000 mi = 1.609 km; 1.000 km = 0.621 mi: Concurrency terminus; Incomplete access

== Related trunklines ==
Over its history, US 27 had several business loops associated with it. Since the conversion of the highway into a freeway starting in the 1950s, these business loops served Marshall, Charlotte, Lansing, St. Johns, Ithaca, Alma, St. Louis, Mount Pleasant, Clare and Harrison. The business loops north of Lansing were redesignated as business loops of US 127 in 2002 while the Charlotte loop had been reassigned BL I-69 with the completion of I-69 through the area. In addition, Michigan had a US 27A designation through Alma and a Truck US 27 in Lansing.

=== Marshall business route ===
Business US Highway 27
- Location: Marshall
- Length: 2.986 mi (4.806 km)
- Existed: 1967–1972

Business US Highway 27 (Bus. US 27) was a business route running through downtown Marshall. The designation ran concurrently with BL I-94 from I-69/US 27 on Michigan Avenue easterly from that freeway into downtown. At the intersection with Kalamazoo Avenue, Bus. US 27 turned northward, separating from BL I-94. The business route ended north of downtown at an interchange with I-94 after running for about three miles (4.8 km).

In 1967, the first segment of I-69 opened in Michigan, bypassing Marshall to the east. The state shifted US 27 out of downtown Marshall to follow the new freeway. From the temporary end of I-69 at I-94, US 27 followed I-94 back to its existing routing north of Marshall. The former route of US 27 through downtown Marshall was then redesignated Bus. US 27, using BL I-94 to connect to the new freeway carrying US 27 west of downtown. This arrangement lasted until 1972 when the Bus. US 27 designation was decommissioned and the section of highway between BL I-94 and I-94 turned over to local control.

Major intersections
The entire highway was in Calhoun County.

| Location | mi | km | Destinations | Notes |
|---|---|---|---|---|
| Marshall Township | 0.000– 0.025 | 0.000– 0.040 | I-69 / US 27 – Fort Wayne, Lansing BL I-94 east (Michigan Avenue) | Western end of BL I-94 concurrency |
| Marshall | 1.429– 1.453 | 2.300– 2.338 | BL I-94 east (Michigan Avenue) | Eastern end of BL I-94 concurrency |
| Marshall Township | 2.966– 2.986 | 4.773– 4.806 | I-94 – Chicago, Detroit | |
1.000 mi = 1.609 km; 1.000 km = 0.621 mi: Concurrency terminus

=== Truck route ===
Truck US Highway 27
- Location: Lansing
- Length: 1.529 mi (2.461 km)
- Existed: c. 1936–1950

Truck US 27 was a former truck route through the city of Lansing. It started at the corner of Capitol Avenue and Main Street and ran along Main Street to Grand Avenue. There, it turned north on Grand Avenue to Kalamazoo Street and turned east on Kalamazoo over the Grand River. At Larch Street, Truck US 27 continued north to rejoin the mainline at the corner of Larch and Saginaw streets.

By the middle of 1936, the US 27/M-78 routing through Lansing was split into two. The mainline was restricted to cars only and moved to run along Capitol Avenue. The former routing was restricted to trucks only and designated as a truck route. In 1950, the bridge for Main Street over the Grand River was completed and mainline US 27/M-78 was rerouted to use it to connect to Larch Street. From there north, US 27/M-78 followed Larch Street supplanting the truck route, which was decommissioned at that time.

== Notes ==
US Highway 27
| Previous state: Indiana | Michigan | Next state: Terminus |
