= Coldwater Township, Michigan =

Coldwater Township is the name of some places in the U.S. state of Michigan:

- Coldwater Township, Branch County, Michigan
- Coldwater Township, Isabella County, Michigan

== See also ==
- Coldwater Township (disambiguation)
