= M213 =

M213 or M-213 may refer to:

- M213, a .50 caliber machine gun
- M-213 (Michigan highway), a former state highway in Michigan
