= M-100 (Michigan highway) =

State highway in Michigan, United States

M-100
- M-100 highlighted in red

Route information
- Maintained by MDOT
- Length: 12.460 mi (20.052 km)
- Existed: c. 1925–present

Major junctions
- South end: I-69 south of Potterville
- M-43 in Grand Ledge
- North end: I-96 near Grand Ledge

Location
- Country: United States
- State: Michigan
- Counties: Eaton, Clinton

Highway system
- Michigan State Trunkline Highway System; Interstate; US; State; Byways
← M-99	→ US 102

M-100 is a north–south state trunkline highway in the central region of the U.S. state of Michigan. It runs between Potterville and Grand Ledge, connecting Interstate 69 (I-69) and I-96 west of the state capital, Lansing. The highway was previously a section of M-16. After M-16 was realigned, M-100 was created by 1927. Three extensions in the 1930s, 1950s and 1990s resulted in the current highway routing.

== Route description ==
M-100 starts at exit 66 on I-69 in Potterville. The highway runs north along Hartel Road, intersecting Lansing Road, the former route of US Highway 27 (US 27) south of downtown. Hartel Road runs due north from Potterville to Grand Ledge. North of M-43 (Saginaw Highway), M-100 follows Clinton Street, jogging northwest along Jefferson Street north of Willow Highway. Crossing the Grand River on Bridge Street, M-100 returns to Clinton Street north of the river. North of town, the roadway is once again known as Hartel Road before changing to Wright Road near the Abrams Municipal Airport. North of Grand River Highway, which is the former route of US 16, M-100 meets I-96 and ends; Wright Road continues to the north of the interchange.

Like other state highways in Michigan, M-100 is maintained by the Michigan Department of Transportation (MDOT). In 2011, the department's traffic surveys showed that on average, 16,626 vehicles travelled along the highway in the city of Grand Ledge and 5,419 vehicles used the highway daily between Potterville and Grand Ledge, the highest and lowest counts respectively. No section of M-100 is listed on the National Highway System, a network of roads important to the country's economy, defense, and mobility.

== History ==
M-100 was created in 1925 when M-16 was rerouted directly between Lansing and Eagle. M-100 started at M-39 in Grand Ledge and ran north to M-16 in Eagle. The highway was extended southward in 1932 to end at US 27/M-78 in Potterville. The northern end was extended to meet the US 16 (now I-96) freeway in 1958. The south was similarly extended in 1991 with the completion of the I-69/US 27 freeway south of Potterville.

== Major intersections ==
County	Location	mi	km	Destinations	Notes
Eaton	Potterville	0.000	0.000	I-69 – Charlotte, Lansing	Exit 66 on I-69
Eaton	Grand Ledge	10.314	16.599	M-43 – Kalamazoo, Lansing	
Clinton	Eagle Township	12.460	20.052	I-96 – Grand Rapids, Lansing	Exit 86 on I-96
1.000 mi = 1.609 km; 1.000 km = 0.621 mi
