= List of state trunkline highways in Michigan =

State Trunkline Highway System
- Highway markers from different years for former M-12 (1919), former M-7 (1926), former M-76 (1948), and current M-28

System information
- Maintained by MDOT
- Length: 5,976.147 mi (9,617.676 km) Plus 14.775 mi (23.778 km) of special routes and 24.079 mi (38.751 km) of unsigned connectors
- Formed: May 13, 1913, signed by July 1, 1919

Highway names
- State: M-nn
- Special Routes: Alternate M-nn (Alt. M-nn or M-nnA); Business M-nn (Bus. M-nn); Bypass M-nn (Byp. M-nn); Connector M-nn (Conn. M-nn); Truck M-nn (Truck M-nn)

System links
- Michigan State Trunkline Highway System; Interstate; US; State; Byways

The state trunkline highways in the US state of Michigan are the segments of the State Trunkline Highway System maintained by the Michigan Department of Transportation and numbered with the "M-" prefix officially.

== Mainline highways ==
| Number | Length (mi) | Length (km) | Southern or western terminus | Northern or eastern terminus | Formed | Removed | Notes |
|---|---|---|---|---|---|---|---|
| M-1 | 21.488 | 34.582 | Adams Avenue in Detroit | BL I-75/Bus. US 24 in Pontiac | 1970 | current | Woodward Avenue |
| M-2 | — | — | Never assigned | | — | — | May have been assigned to service drives along I-96 in Livonia, but not marked on official state maps as such |
| M-3 | 7.807 | 12.564 | US 25 in Detroit | US 16 in Detroit | 1937 | 1939 | Became M-39 (now Schaefer Highway) |
| M-3 | 26.685 | 42.945 | Randolph & Broadway streets in Detroit | I-94 and M-29 in Chesterfield Township | 1973 | current | Gratiot Avenue |
| M-4 | — | — | St. Ignace | DeTour Village | 1936 | 1939 | Became M-39, now M-134 |
| M-4 | 4.687 | 7.543 | Southfield | West Bloomfield Township | 1979 | 1986 | Northwestern Highway; now part of M-10 |
| M-5 | — | — | Cedarville | Sault Ste. Marie | 1933 | 1939 | Became M-129 |
| M-5 | 27.890 | 44.885 | Pontiac Trail in Commerce Township | Cass Avenue in Detroit | 1977 | current | Grand River Avenue |
| M-6 | — | — | Phoenix | Eagle River | 1926 | 1938 | Became M-111 (now part of M-26) |
| M-6 | — | — | I-96 in Novi | I-94 in Roseville | 1970 | 1979 | Signed along the service drives for the eastern section of I-696 |
| M-6 | 19.696 | 31.698 | I-196 near Hudsonville | I-96 near Cascade | 2001 | current | Paul B. Henry Freeway, South Beltline Freeway |
| M-7 | 34.059 | 54.813 | Three Rivers | Coldwater | 1927 | 1940 | Replaced by M-86 |
| M-8 | 5.491 | 8.837 | I-96 in Detroit | Conant Avenue near Hamtramck | 1993 | current | Davison Freeway; built in the 1940s as the first urban, depressed freeway in the world |
| M-9 | — | — | Phoenix | Eagle Harbor | 1927 | 1929 | Replaced by M-64 (became M-129, later became part of M-26; now a local road) |
| M-9 | — | — | Ohio state line | Lansing | 1929 | 1940 | Replaced by M-99 |
| M-10 | — | — | Ohio state line south of Erie | Mackinaw City | 1919 | 1926 | Replaced by US 24, US 112, US 10, and US 23 |
| M-10 | — | — | US 10 in Flint | US 10 in Flint | 1928 | 1942 | Replaced by Bus. US 10 |
| M-10 | 22.881 | 36.823 | M-3 & BS I-375 in Detroit | Orchard Lake Road in West Bloomfield | 1986 | current | John C. Lodge Freeway, Northwestern Highway |
| M-11 | — | — | Indiana state line in Grand Beach | Mackinaw City | 1919 | 1926 | Replaced by US 12 and US 31 |
| M-11 | — | — | Napoleon | Saline | 1926 | 1954 | Manchester to Saline became part of an extension of M-92 (now M-52); rest given to local control |
| M-11 | 20.840 | 33.539 | I-96 in Marne | I-96 in Cascade | 1961 | current | |
| M-12 | 406.63 | 654.41 | Ironwood | Sault Ste. Marie | 1919 | 1926 | Replaced by US 2, M-69 and what is now M-95 |
| M-13 | — | — | Fife Lake | Petoskey | 1919 | 1926 | Replaced by M-131 (now US 131) |
| M-13 | — | — | Brockway | Fort Gratiot | 1927 | 1931 | Replaced by M-136 |
| M-13 | 73.339 | 118.028 | I-69 in Lennon | US 23 in Standish | c. 1932 | current | |
| M-14 | — | — | Ohio State line near Waldron | Jackson | 1919 | 1931 | Replaced by US 127 |
| M-14 | — | — | Battle Creek | Edmore | 1931 | 1942 | Replaced by a reroute of M-66 |
| M-14 | 22.250 | 35.808 | I-94 near Ann Arbor | I-96/I-275 in Livonia | 1956 | current | |
| M-15 | — | — | Wisconsin State line near Menominee | Copper Harbor | 1919 | 1926 | Replaced by US 41 |
| M-15 | 73.664 | 118.551 | US 24 in Clarkston | M-25 in Bay City | 1926 | current | |
| M-16 | — | — | Muskegon | Detroit | 1919 | 1926 | Replaced by US 16 |
| M-17 | 6.390 | 10.284 | US 23 and BL I-94 in Ann Arbor | US 12 in Ypsilanti | 1919 | current | |
| M-18 | 77.530 | 124.772 | US 10 near North Bradley | M-72 & F-97 near Luzerne | 1919 | current | |
| M-19 | 85.626 | 137.802 | I-94 near New Haven | M-142 near Bad Axe | 1919 | current | |
| M-20 | — | — | Ludington | Bay City | 1919 | 1926 | Replaced by US 10 |
| M-20 | 132.435 | 213.133 | US 31 in New Era | US 10 in Midland | 1926 | current | |
| M-21 | 99.322 | 159.843 | M-37/M-44 in Grand Rapids | I-475 in Flint | 1919 | current | |
| M-22 | 116.651 | 187.732 | US 31 near Manistee | US 31/M-37/M-72 in Traverse City | 1919 | current | Leelanau Scenic Heritage Route |
| M-23 | — | — | — | — | 1919 | 1926 | Replaced by US 112, now US 12 |
| M-24 | — | — | Muskegon | Saginaw | 1919 | 1926 | Replaced by M-20 and US 10 (one part now M-47) |
| M-24 | 75.691 | 121.813 | I-75 & BL I-75 in Auburn Hills | M-25 in Unionville | 1926 | current | Extension of US 24 |
| M-25 | — | — | Skandia | Sault Ste. Marie | 1919 | 1926 | Replaced by an extension of M-28 |
| M-25 | 147.638 | 237.600 | BL I-69/BL I-94 in Port Huron | I-75/US 23 & US 10 in Bay City | 1933 | current | Extension of US 25 (now decommissioned) |
| M-26 | 96.355 | 155.068 | US 45 in Rockland | US 41 in Copper Harbor | 1919 | current | |
| M-27 | — | — | — | — | 1919 | 1926 | Replaced by M-29 (one part now M-25), M-51 (now M-136, Wildcat Road, M-90, and Old M-51), and M-83 (this section now M-142) |
| M-27 | 16.763 | 26.977 | I-75 near Indian River | US 23 and C-66 in Cheboygan | 1961 | current | Formerly part of US 27 |
| M-28 | 290.373 | 467.310 | US 2 in Wakefield | M-129 in Dafter Township | 1919 | current | Longest state trunkline excluding Interstate or US Highways |
| M-29 | — | — | Indiana state line south of Coldwater | Lansing | 1919 | 1926 | Replaced by US 27 |
| M-29 | 41.634 | 67.003 | I-94 & M-3 in Chesterfield Township | BL I-94 in Marysville | 1926 | current | |
| M-30 | 65.465 | 105.356 | M-46 near Merrill | BL I-75/M-55 in West Branch | 1919 | current | |
| M-31 | 166.910 | 268.616 | M-21 in Port Huron | M-20 in Bay City | 1919 | 1926 | Replaced by M-29 (this section now M-25) and M-83 (this section now M-142) |
| M-32 | 100.003 | 160.939 | M-66 in East Jordan | US 23 in Alpena | 1919 | current | |
| M-33 | 121.858 | 196.111 | I-75 in Alger | M-27 near Cheboygan | 1919 | current | |
| M-34 | 28.938 | 46.571 | M-99 near Osseo | Bus. US 223 in Adrian | 1919 | current | |
| M-35 | 128.388 | 206.620 | US 41 in Menominee | US 41/M-28 in Negaunee Township | 1919 | current | |
| M-36 | — | — | M-21 in Attica | M-53 in Burnside | 1919 | 1930 | |
| M-36 | 43.298 | 69.681 | US 127 in Mason | US 23 in Whitmore Lake | 1930 | current | |
| M-37 | 221.892 | 357.101 | I-94 & BL I-94 in Battle Creek | Cul-de-sac at Old Mission Point | 1919 | current | |
| M-38 | — | — | US 23 in Bridgeport | M-53 in Marlette | 1919 | 1961 | |
| M-38 | 42.225 | 67.955 | US 45 & M-64 in Ontonagon | US 41 in Baraga | 1968 | current | Formerly part of M-35 |
| M-39 | — | — | Woodbury | Lansing | 1919 | 1937 | Became an extension of M-43 |
| M-39 | 7.807 | 12.564 | US 25 in Detroit | US 16 in Detroit | 1939 | 1959 | Schaefer Highway |
| M-39 | 17.006 | 27.369 | Lafayette Boulevard in Lincoln Park | M-10 in Southfield | 1959 | current | Southfield Freeway, Southfield Highway; roadway continues as Southfield Road at northern end |
| M-40 | 74.266 | 119.520 | US 12 near Mottville | BL I-196/US 31 in Holland | 1919 | current | |
| M-41 | 38.1 | 61.3 | M-24 in Holton | M-11 in Hart | 1919 | 1926 | Replaced in part by M-20, now M-120 |
| M-42 | 10.339 | 16.639 | Bus. US 131 in Manton | M-66 near Lake City | 1919 | current | |
| M-43 | 136.723 | 220.034 | BL I-196 in South Haven | I-96 in Webberville | 1919 | current | |
| M-44 | 37.463 | 60.291 | M-11 and M-37 in Kentwood | M-66 near Ionia | 1919 | current | |
| M-45 | — | — | Wisconsin border south of Kingsford | Humboldt Township | 1919 | 1934 | Renumbered to M-95 because of designation of US 45 in Michigan |
| M-45 | 24.434 | 39.323 | US 31 in Agnew | I-196 in Grand Rapids | 1964 | current | Lake Michigan Drive |
| M-46 | 199.190 | 320.565 | Muskegon Avenue in Muskegon | M-25 in Port Sanilac | 1919 | current | Trans-peninsular highway |
| M-47 | 14.328 | 23.059 | M-46 near Shields | US 10 near Midland | 1919 | current | |
| M-48 | 43.723 | 70.365 | I-75 in Rudyard | M-134 in DeTour Village | 1919 | current | |
| M-49 | — | — | US 127 in Mason | US 23 in Whitmore Lake | 1919 | 1930 | Replaced by M-36 |
| M-49 | 25.480 | 41.006 | SR 49 near Columbia, OH | M-99 in Litchfield | 1930 | current | |
| M-50 | 138.072 | 222.205 | I-96 near Lowell | US 24 in Monroe | 1919 | current | |
| M-51 | — | — | Holland | Grand Rapids | 1919 | 1926 | Replaced by an extension of M-21 (this section now M-121) |
| M-51 | — | — | M-46 in Carsonville | M-142 in Harbor Beach | 1926 | 1965 | |
| M-51 | 40.405 | 65.026 | SR 933 at Indiana state line near South Bend, IN | I-94 near Paw Paw | 1971 | current | |
| M-52 | 127.300 | 204.869 | SR 109 at Ohio state line | M-46 near Saginaw | 1919 | current | |
| M-53 | 120.980 | 194.698 | M-3 in Detroit | M-25 in Port Austin | 1919 | current | Van Dyke Avenue (splits to freeway at Clinton Township) |
| M-54 | — | — | Grand Rapids | Baldwin | 1919 | 1926 | Transferred to an extension of M-37 |
| M-54 | 1.270 | 2.044 | WIS 77 at Ironwood | US 2 in Ironwood | 1934 | 1942 | transferred to Business US 2 |
| M-54 | 30.276 | 48.724 | I-75 in Grand Blanc | I-75/US 23 in Birch Run | 1962 | current | |
| M-55 | 150.944 | 242.921 | US 31 in Manistee | US 23 in Tawas City | 1919 | current | Trans-peninsular highway |
| M-56 | 16.426 | 26.435 | US 24 in Monroe | US 24/US 25 near Flat Rock | 1919 | 1957 | |
| M-56 | 12.726 | 20.481 | M-13 & M-21 near Lennon | I-69/M-21 in Flint | 1971 | 1984 | Replaced by M-21 |
| M-57 | 16.426 | 26.435 | Boyne Falls | Clarion | 1919 | 1926 | Replaced by M-75 |
| M-57 | 1.132 | 1.822 | WIS 57 in Breitung Township | US 2 in Quinnesec | 1927 | 1928 | Transferred to an extension of US 141 |
| M-57 | 105.377 | 169.588 | US 131 near Rockford | M-15 near Otisville | 1930 | current | |
| M-58 | — | — | Indiana state line south of Niles | St. Joseph | 1919 | 1926 | Replaced by US 31 |
| M-58 | — | — | US 10 in Pontiac | US 10 in Pontiac | 1930 | 1961 | Replaced by reroute of US 10 (now US 24 and Business US 24) |
| M-58 | 5.108 | 8.221 | M-47 near Shields | I-675 in Saginaw | 1971 | current | |
| M-59 | 60.514 | 97.388 | I-96 near Howell | I-94 near Mount Clemens | 1919 | current | Hall Road |
| M-60 | 104.224 | 167.732 | US 12 near Niles | I-94 & BL I-94 near Jackson | 1919 | current | |
| M-61 | 62.276 | 100.224 | M-115 near Marion | US 23 in Standish | 1919 | current | |
| M-62 | 28.329 | 45.591 | SR 23 near Granger, IN | M-140 near Eau Claire | c. 1924 | current | |
| M-63 | — | — | US 131 in Le Roy | M-37 west of Luther | 1919 | 1961 | |
| M-63 | 16.141 | 25.976 | M-139 near Scottdale | I-196/US 31 near Lake Michigan Beach | 1986 | current | Formerly part of US 33 |
| M-64 | — | — | Ohio State Line | Lansing | 1919 | 1929 | Replaced by M-9 (now M-99) |
| M-64 | — | — | Phoenix | Eagle Harbor | 1929 | 1930 | Replaced by M-129 (later became part of M-26; now a local road) |
| M-64 | 63.765 | 102.620 | CTH-B near Presque Isle, WI | US 45 & M-38 in Ontonagon | 1930 | current | |
| M-65 | — | — | Ohio State Line | Flint | 1919 | 1926 | Replaced by US 23 |
| M-65 | 103.176 | 166.046 | US 23 near Omer | US 23 near Rogers City | 1930 | current | |
| M-66 | 266.399 | 428.728 | SR 9 near Sturgis | US 31 in Charlevoix | 1919 | current | |
| M-67 | 12.044 | 19.383 | US 41 in Trenary | M-94 in Chatham | 1919 | current | |
| M-68 | 14.235 | 22.909 | M-26 in Rockland | Ontonagon | 1919 | 1927 | Replaced by M-35 (this section now part of US 45) |
| M-68 | 53.390 | 85.923 | US 31 in Alanson | Bus. US 23 in Rogers City | 1936 | current | |
| M-69 | 55.280 | 88.965 | WIS 69 at Wisconsin state line | M-28 in Covington | 1919 | 1926 | Replaced by US 2 and US 102 (now part of US 141) |
| M-69 | 65.260 | 105.026 | US 2/US 141 in Crystal Falls | US 2/US 41 near Bark River | 1926 | current | |
| M-70 | 22.1 | 35.6 | M-76 near Sterling | M-55 near Prescott | 1919 | 1960 | |
| M-71 | 10.530 | 16.946 | M-21 in Owosso | I-69 in Durand | 1919 | current | |
| M-72 | 156.552 | 251.946 | M-22 in Empire | US 23 in Harrisville | 1919 | current | Trans-peninsular highway |
| M-73 | 8.171 | 13.150 | STH-55 near Iron River | US 2 near Iron River | 1919 | current | |
| M-74 | 18.4 | 29.6 | M-66 near Pioneer | M-55 near Merritt | 1919 | 1939 | |
| M-75 | 2.793 | 4.495 | Wisconsin state line in Breitung Township | M-12 in Iron Mountain | 1919 | 1926 | Replaced by an extension of M-45 (now M-95) |
| M-75 | 11.768 | 18.939 | US 131 in Boyne Falls | US 131 in Walloon Lake | 1927 | current | |
| M-76 | 61.187 | 98.471 | US 23 in Standish | US 27 near Grayling | 1919 | 1973 | Replaced by I-75 |
| M-77 | 42.602 | 68.561 | US 2 in Blaney Park | H-58 in Grand Marais | 1919 | current | |
| M-78 | 10.744 | 17.291 | M-66 near Battle Creek | I-69 near Olivet | 1919 | current | |
| M-79 | 24.890 | 40.057 | M-37 near Hastings | BL I-69/M-50 in Charlotte | 1919 | current | |
| M-80 | — | — | Adrian | Somerset | 1919 | 1926 | Replaced by US 127 (now US 223) |
| M-80 | — | — | M-18 in Beaverton | M-30 in Billings | 1927 | 1939 | |
| M-80 | 7.917 | 12.741 | I-75 & H-63 near Kinross | M-129 near Kincheloe | 1994 | current | |
| M-81 | 45.636 | 73.444 | M-13 in Saginaw | M-53 near Cass City | 1919 | current | |
| M-82 | — | — | M-25 near Newberry | Eight Mile Corner | 1919 | 1926 | Replaced by M-48 |
| M-82 | 31.492 | 50.681 | M-120 near Fremont | US 131 near Howard City | 1926 | current | |
| M-83 | — | — | Mohawk | Gay | 1919 | 1926 | |
| M-83 | — | — | — | Harbor Beach | 1926 | 1939 | Renumbered M-142 |
| M-83 | 14.672 | 23.612 | I-75/US 23 in Birch Run | M-15 near Richville | 1929 | current | |
| M-84 | — | — | Garnet | McLeods Corner southeast of Newberry | 1919 | 1926 | Replaced by M-48 |
| M-84 | — | — | M-81 near Reese | M-29 in Unionville | 1926 | 1930 | Replaced by M-83 |
| M-84 | 14.710 | 23.673 | M-58 in Saginaw | M-25 in Bay City | 1960 | current | |
| M-85 | — | — | M-66 (now M-91) | Stanton | 1919 | 1930 | Replaced by M-57 |
| M-85 | — | — | Mayville | Caro | 1930 | 1941 | Replaced by M-24 |
| M-85 | 21.882 | 35.216 | I-75 near Rockwood | Griswold Street in Detroit | 1956 | current | Fort Street |
| M-86 | — | — | Six Lakes | Remus | 1921 | 1924 | Replaced by M-66 |
| M-86 | — | — | Orleans | Woods Corners | 1924 | 1929 | Replaced by M-44 |
| M-86 | 34.059 | 54.813 | Bus. US 131/M-60 in Three Rivers | US 12 near Coldwater | 1940 | current | Replaced M-7 |
| M-87 | 11.564 | 18.610 | Bus. US 23 in Fenton | US 10 in Holly | 1919 | 1960 | |
| M-88 | 26.215 | 42.189 | US 31 in Eastport | US 131 & C-38 in Mancelona | 1919 | current | |
| M-89 | 61.153 | 98.416 | I-196/US 31 near Ganges | BL I-94 in Battle Creek | 1919 | current | |
| M-90 | 16.553 | 26.639 | M-45 near Sagola | Foster City | 1919 | 1927 | Replaced by M-69 |
| M-90 | 44.178 | 71.098 | M-24 near North Branch | M-25 in Lexington | 1927 | current | |
| M-91 | — | — | M-15 in Memominee | Cedar River | 1919 | 1927 | Replaced by M-35 |
| M-91 | — | — | US 23 in Rogers City | CR 646 near Huron Beach | 1927 | 1940 | Replaced by US 23 |
| M-91 | 24.464 | 39.371 | M-44 near Belding | M-46 in Lakeview | 1942 | current | |
| M-92 | 36.639 | 58.965 | SR 109 near Clinton | US 12 in Stockbridge | 1919 | 1962 | Replaced by M-52 |
| M-93 | 11.810 | 19.006 | Camp Grayling | Hartwick Pines State Park | 1919 | current | |
| M-94 | 86.983 | 139.986 | M-553 near K.I. Sawyer | US 2 in Manistique | c. 1927 | current | |
| M-95 | 5.147 | 8.283 | M-68 in Onaway | Onaway State Park | 1919 | 1934 | Replaced by M-211 |
| M-95 | 55.162 | 88.775 | CTH-N at Aurora, WI | US 41/M-28 in Humboldt Township | 1934 | current | Leif Erickson Highway; replaced M-45 |
| M-96 | 33.379 | 53.718 | BS I-94 in Kalamazoo | BL I-94 in Marshall | 1926 | current | |
| M-97 | 17.169 | 27.631 | M-3 in Detroit | M-59 near Mount Clemens | 1929 | current | |
| M-98 | 16.2 | 26.1 | US 2 near Germfask | M-28 near McMillan | 1919 | 1960 | Now H-33 and H-44 |
| M-99 | — | — | US 31 in Muskegon | Hart | 1919 | 1929 | |
| M-99 | — | — | US 2 in Gulliver | Port Inland | 1931 | 1939 | |
| M-99 | 86.058 | 138.497 | SR 15 near Pioneer, OH | I-496 & Capitol Loop in Lansing | 1940 | current | Replaced M-9 |
| M-100 | 12.460 | 20.052 | I-69 near Potterville | I-96 near Grand Ledge | 1927 | current | |
| M-101 | 1.22 | 1.96 | Millersburg | US 23 near Millersburg | — | — | |
| M-102 | 20.804 | 33.481 | M-5 on the Livonia–Farmington Hills city line | I-94 in Harper Woods | c. 1928 | current | 8 Mile Road |
| M-103 | — | — | SR 13 near Bristol, IN | US 12 in White Pigeon | 1932 | c. 1960 | Replaced by US 131 |
| M-103 | 3.055 | 4.917 | SR 15 near Bristol, IN | US 12 in Mottville | c. 1960 | current | Replaced part of US 131 |
| M-104 | — | — | M-47 at Pittsburg | DeWitt | 1927 | 1939 | |
| M-104 | 7.677 | 12.355 | US 31 in Ferrysburg | I-96 near Nunica | 1940 | current | Replaced part of US 16 |
| M-105 | 3.548 | 5.710 | M-53 near Bad Axe | M-83 near Elkton | 1928 | 1939 | |
| M-106 | 27.041 | 43.518 | BL I-94/Bus. US 127/M-50 in Jackson | M-36 near Gregory | 1928 | current | |
| M-107 | 9.576 | 15.411 | Lake of the Clouds | M-64 in Silver City | 1935 | 2008 | |
| M-108 | — | — | Three-legged highway in Mackinaw City | | 1928 | 1957 | Connected the State Highway Ferry Docks with the Fort Michilimackinac State Historic Park and US 31 |
| M-108 | 1.069 | 1.720 | I-75 near Mackinaw City | Michigan Welcome Center in Mackinaw City | 1960 | 2010 | |
| M-109 | 6.831 | 10.993 | M-22 near Empire | M-22 in Glen Arbor | c. 1929 | current | Leelanau Scenic Heritage Route; runs through the Sleeping Bear Dunes National Lakeshore |
| M-110 | 1.715 | 2.760 | US 31 in Parkdale | Orchard Beach State Park | 1927 | 2003 | |
| M-111 | — | — | Bay City | Bay City State Park | 1928 | 1938 | |
| M-111 | — | — | Phoenix | Eagle River | 1939 | 1940 | |
| M-112 | 8.70 | 14.00 | Ypsilanti | Dearborn | 1942 | 1956 | Replaced by I-94 |
| M-113 | 16.573 | 26.672 | M-37 near Hannah | US 131 in Walton Junction | 1927 | current | |
| M-114 | 13.454 | 21.652 | Paris Township | Comstock Park | c. 1929 | 1945 | Former bypass routing around Grand Rapids; trunkline had three legs at the time of its decommissioning with an east–west branch in Comstock Park |
| M-115 | 96.432 | 155.192 | Bus. US 10/Bus. US 127 in Clare | M-22 in Frankfort | 1929 | current | |
| M-116 | 7.018 | 11.294 | US 10 in Ludington | Ludington State Park | 1928 | current | |
| M-117 | 14.479 | 23.302 | US 2 in Engadine | M-28 near Newberry | 1941 | current | |
| M-118 | 10.247 | 16.491 | M-40/M-89 in Allegan | US 131 near Martin | 1929 | 1988 | Replaced by M-222 |
| M-119 | — | — | M-40 in Paw Paw | US 12 near Mottville | 1930 | 1971 | Replaced by M-40 |
| M-119 | 27.548 | 44.334 | US 31 near Bay View | C-66/C-77 in Cross Village | 1979 | current | Formerly the northern end of M-131 |
| M-120 | — | — | US 16 in Lansing | Lansing | 1930 | 1939 | Replaced by M-174 |
| M-120 | — | — | SR 120 on the Michigan–Indiana state line | SR 120 on the Michigan–Ohio state line | 1939 | 1961 | |
| M-120 | 27.901 | 44.902 | Bus. US 31 in Muskegon | M-20 in Hesperia | 1969 | current | Once was part of M-20 |
| M-121 | — | — | — | — | 1933 | 1935 | |
| M-121 | 5.700 | 9.173 | I-69 near Bishop Airport in Flint | M-54 in Burton | 1935 | 2003 | Bristol Road; provided access to Bishop International Airport and a truck bypass route from I-69 to General Motors plants near I-75 |
| M-121 | 12.763 | 20.540 | Main Street in Zeeland | I-196 in Grandville | 2007 | current | Once was part of M-21; Chicago Drive |
| M-122 | 1.068 | 1.719 | US 2 in St. Ignace | State Ferry Dock in St. Ignace | 1929 | 1957 | Former route from US 2 to state ferry docks for service from St. Ignace to Mackinaw City; ferry service ended after the Mackinac Bridge was opened in 1957. |
| M-123 | 96.071 | 154.611 | I-75 near St. Ignace | M-28 near Newberry | 1936 | current | Tahquamenon Scenic Heritage Route |
| M-124 | 7.731 | 12.442 | M-50 in Brooklyn | US 12 in Springville | 1929 | current | |
| M-125 | — | — | Thompson | US 2 | 1931 | 1936 | |
| M-125 | — | — | 7 Mile Road in Bay County | US 23 | 1938 | c. 1956 | |
| M-125 | 19.480 | 31.350 | Detroit Avenue near Toledo, OH | US 24 near Monroe | 1974 | current | Former routing of US 25 |
| M-126 | 11.94 | 19.22 | Muskegon Heights | Nunica | 1934 | 1940 | Replaced by US 16 |
| M-129 | — | — | Marenisco | Lake Gogebic State Park | 1926 | 1930 | Replaced by M-64 |
| M-129 | — | — | Phoenix | Copper Harbor | 1930 | 1935 | Replaced by M-26 (portions now a local road) |
| M-129 | 33.223 | 53.467 | M-134 in Cedarville | BS I-75 in Sault Ste. Marie | 1939 | current | Follows the Michigan Meridian |
| M-130 | 9.11 | 14.66 | US 23/M-50 in Raisinville Township | US 24 in Monroe | 1930 | 1955 | |
| M-131 | 27.548 | 44.334 | US 31 in Bayview | C-66/C-77 in Cross Village | 1926 | 1979 | Replaced by M-119 |
| M-132 | 7.766 | 12.498 | Main Street in Dexter | US 12 in Ann Arbor | 1928 | 1959 | |
| M-134 | — | — | M-66 near McBain | Prosper Road in Falmouth | 1929 | 1938 | |
| M-134 | 50.233 | 80.842 | I-75 near St. Ignace | Drummond | 1939 | current | Includes the Drummond Island Ferry across the DeTour Passage |
| M-135 | 18.2 | 29.3 | US 2 near Gould City | M-28 near McMillan | c. 1928 | 1960 | Now H-33 |
| M-136 | 17.033 | 27.412 | M-19 in Brockway | M-25 in Port Huron | 1931 | current | |
| M-137 | 2.884 | 4.641 | Interlochen State Park | US 31 in Interlochen | 1930 | 2020 | Returned to local control; formerly connected to Interlochen Center for the Arts and Interlochen State Park |
| M-138 | 20.141 | 32.414 | M-15 near Munger | M-24 near Akron | 1931 | current | |
| M-139 | 26.487 | 42.627 | US 12 near Niles | BL I-94 in Benton Harbor | 1931 | current | |
| M-140 | 37.205 | 59.876 | M-139 near Niles | I-196/US 31 & BL I-196 near South Haven | c. 1931 | current | |
| M-142 | — | — | M-55 and M-66 near Lake City | Lake City Experiment Station at Call Road near Lake City | 1929 | 1939 | now Jennings Road |
| M-142 | 39.186 | 63.064 | M-25 in Bay Port | M-25 in Harbor Beach | 1939 | current | |
| M-143 | — | — | US 27 near Cheboygan | Cheboygan State Park | 1931 | 1960 | Lincoln Avenue |
| M-143 | 0.936 | 1.506 | Lansing–East Lansing city line | M-43 in East Lansing | 1962 | current | Unsigned from 1989 until 2013 |
| M-144 | 0.388 | 0.624 | Michigan State Police Headquarters in East Lansing | M-39 in East Lansing | 1937 | 1939 | |
| M-144 | 15.078 | 24.266 | Roscommon | Luzerne | 1940 | 1973 | |
| M-145 | — | — | Vandercook Lake | Jackson | — | — | Designation used on paper for a proposed western bypass of Jackson; only one portion was designated on paper along Springport Road |
| M-146 | 5.13 | 8.26 | US 25 in Port Huron | Blue Water Bridge in Port Huron | 1933 | 1966 | |
| M-147 | 0.505 | 0.813 | M-106 near Jackson | State Prison of Southern Michigan | 1936 | 1991 | |
| M-149 | 10.605 | 17.067 | US 2 near Thompson | Palms Book State Park | c. 1930 | current | |
| M-150 | 4.767 | 7.672 | M-59 in Rochester Hills | Tienken Road in Rochester | c. 1930 | current | Rochester Road |
| M-151 | 17.376 | 27.964 | Niles | Union | 1931 | 1935 | |
| M-151 | 3.715 | 5.979 | US 223 in Whiteford Township | US 23 in Whiteford Township | 1935 | 1977 | Replaced by US 223 |
| M-152 | 7.701 | 12.394 | Sister Lakes | M-51 near Dowagiac | 1933 | current | |
| M-153 | 25.127 | 40.438 | M-14 near Dixboro | I-94/US 12 in Detroit | 1930 | current | Ford Road |
| M-154 | 6.125 | 9.857 | Green Road in Sans Souci | Ferry dock in Sans Souci | 1931 | current | Located on Harsens Island |
| M-155 | 3.420 | 5.504 | Howell State Hospital | BL I-96 in Howell | 1931 | current | No longer signed since 1987, still under state control |
| M-156 | 10.665 | 17.164 | SR 108 at the Ohio state line near Morenci | M-34 in Clayton | c. 1931 | current | |
| M-157 | 1.193 | 1.920 | M-55 near Prudenville | M-18 near Prudenville | 1932 | current | |
| M-158 | 3.285 | 5.287 | M-99 in Hillsdale County | M-99 in Hillsdale County | 1934 | 1934 | Replaced by M-99 |
| M-160 | — | — | Mount Clemens | Selfridge Field | 1941 | 1942 | |
| M-162 | — | — | M-28 near Au Train | M-94 near Au Train | 1935 | 1939 | Returned to local control, now H-03 |
| M-164 | 2.006 | 3.228 | Snover | M-19 near Snover | c. 1936 | c. 1939 | |
| M-165 | 0.393 | 0.632 | M-21 near Ovid | Ovid | c. 1936 | c. 1939 | |
| M-166 | 12.754 | 20.526 | US 16 in Portland | M-21 in Muir | c. 1936 | 1939 | |
| M-167 | 0.610 | 0.982 | M-21 near Saranac | Saranac | c. 1936 | c. 1939 | |
| M-168 | 0.953 | 1.534 | Former ferry dock in Elberta | M-22 in Elberta | 1931 | 2012 | |
| M-169 | — | — | Fostoria | M-36 east of Fostoria | 1930 | 1936 | |
| M-169 | — | — | Houghton Lake | | 1935 | 1949 | |
| M-169 | — | — | Houghton Lake | | 1949 | 1950 | |
| M-170 | — | — | McMillan | | — | 1939 | |
| M-171 | — | — | Spruce | Alpena | 1932 | 1934 | |
| M-171 | 31.803 | 51.182 | US 23 in Oscoda | US 23 in Caledonia Township | 1936 | 1960 | Now F-41 |
| M-172 | — | — | Middleville | | — | 1939 | |
| M-173 | — | — | Orleans | | 1928 | 1938 | |
| M-173 | — | — | Menominee | | 1939 | 1972 | Spur to the Ann Arbor Railroad ferry docks |
| M-174 | — | — | Buchanan | | — | 1939 | |
| M-174 | — | — | Lansing | | 1939 | 1970 | |
| M-175 | — | — | Galien | | — | 1939 | |
| M-176 | — | — | Durand | | — | 1939 | |
| M-177 | — | — | Alma | St. Louis | — | 1939 | |
| M-178 | 1.036 | 1.667 | Wetmore | Munising | 1936 | 1941 | Former connector between M-28 and M-98, now part of M-28 |
| M-179 | — | — | US 131 near LeRoy | M-63 near LeRoy | 1935 | 1958 | |
| M-179 | 16.963 | 27.299 | US 131 near Bradley | M-37/M-43 near Hastings | 1998 | current | Chief Noonday Trail Recreational Heritage Route |
| M-180 | — | — | Menominee | | 1933 | 1935 | Spur to the Ann Arbor Railroad ferry docks |
| M-181 | — | — | Dryden | Metamora | — | 1959 | |
| M-183 | — | — | US 16 | US 23 | 1932 | 1963 | |
| M-183 | 16.377 | 26.356 | Fayette State Park | US 2 in Garden Corners | 1985 | current | |
| M-184 | — | — | Richland | Kellogg Bird Sanctuary | — | 1939 | |
| M-185 | 8.004 | 12.881 | Loop around Mackinac Island | | 1933 | current | The only car-free state highway in the US |
| M-186 | 4.478 | 7.207 | M-35 near Perkins | US 2/US 41 in Rapid River | 1932 | 1939 | Now CR 186 |
| M-186 | 2.493 | 4.012 | M-113 near Kingsley | US 131 in Fife Lake | 1940 | current | |
| M-188 | 4.559 | 7.337 | M-50/M-99 in Eaton Rapids | VFW National Home for Children | 1932 | current | |
| M-189 | 7.786 | 12.530 | STH-139 at the Wisconsin state line | US 2 in Iron River | 1932 | current | |
| M-191 | — | — | Fenwick | | — | 1939 | |
| M-193 | — | — | Morrice | | — | 1936 | |
| M-194 | — | — | New Lothrop | | — | 1939 | |
| M-195 | — | — | Henderson | | — | 1937 | |
| M-196 | — | — | Hersey | | — | 1939 | |
| M-198 | — | — | Lakeview | | — | 1939 | |
| M-199 | — | — | Daggett | | 1933 | 1939 | |
| M-199 | 4.030 | 6.486 | I-94 near Albion | BL I-94 in Albion | 1998 | current | |
| M-200 | — | — | Stephenson | | 1933 | 1939 | |
| M-201 | 1.467 | 2.361 | M-22 in Northport | CR 640 near Northport | 1949 | current | |
| M-203 | 17.944 | 28.878 | US 41 in Hancock | US 41/M-26 in Calumet | 1933 | current | Connects with McLain State Park |
| M-204 | 7.220 | 11.619 | M-22 near Leland | M-22 in Suttons Bay | 1933 | current | Part of the Leelanau Scenic Heritage Route |
| M-205 | 1.709 | 2.750 | SR 19 at the Indiana state line | US 12 near Adamsville | 1935 | 2002 | Formerly US 112S |
| M-206 | — | — | Eagle Harbor | Eagle Harbor Lighthouse | 1935 | 1940 | Replaced by M-26 |
| M-208 | 13.3 | 21.4 | Au Sable River | Grayling | 1936 | 1939 | Replaced by M-72 |
| M-209 | 0.543 | 0.874 | M-109 at Glen Haven | Coast Guard Life Saving Station at Glen Haven | c. 1920 | 1996 | Formerly the shortest trunkline in Michigan |
| M-210 | 1.928 | 3.103 | M-21 near Pewamo | M-21 near Pewamo | 1933 | 1939 | Former route of M-21 |
| M-211 | 5.147 | 8.283 | M-68 in Onaway | Onaway State Park | 1934 | current | |
| M-212 | 0.732 | 1.178 | Aloha State Park | M-33 near Aloha | 1937 | current | Shortest signed trunkline in Michigan |
| M-213 | — | — | Muskegon | Brunswick | — | 1960 | Now part of B-35 |
| M-213 | — | — | Muskegon State Park | Muskegon | 1960 | 1970 | |
| M-214 | — | — | M-79 in Nashville | M-66 in Nashville | 1934 | 1953 | |
| M-215 | 0.896 | 1.442 | US 12 in Lawrence | Lawrence village limits | 1936 | 1956 | Previously ran northward to terminate at M-43 in Bangor |
| M-216 | 9.379 | 15.094 | M-40 in Marcellus | US 131 near Moorepark | 1935 | current | |
| M-217 | 1.653 | 2.660 | CR 17 at the Indiana state line | US 12 near Union | 2002 | current | Michiana Parkway |
| M-218 | 18.108 | 29.142 | I-96 in Wixom | Bus. US 10 in Pontiac | c. 1936 | 1963 | |
| M-219 | — | — | Manistique | | 1935 | 1966 | Spur to the Ann Arbor Railroad ferry docks |
| M-221 | 2.545 | 4.096 | M-28 near Brimley | Lakeshore Drive in Brimley | 1945 | current | |
| M-222 | 10.247 | 16.491 | M-40/M-89 in Allegan | US 131 near Martin | 1988 | current | Replaced M-118 |
| M-227 | 6.834 | 10.998 | I-69 near Marshall | BL I-94 in Marshall | 1998 | current | Once was part of US 27 |
| M-231 | 7.002 | 11.269 | M-45 near Robinson | I-96 and M-104 near Nunica | 2015 | current | Scaled-down bypass route for US 31 |
| M-239 | 1.136 | 1.828 | SR 39 at Indiana state line | I-94 near New Buffalo | 1963 | current | |
| M-247 | 3.036 | 4.886 | M-13 in Bay City | Bay City State Park | 1961 | current | |
| M-275 | — | — | Novi | Clarkston | 1975 | 1985 | Proposed northern extension of I-275 that was cancelled before being built |
| M-294 | 1.535 | 2.470 | I-94 near Battle Creek | M-96 near Battle Creek | 1998 | current | |
| M-311 | 13.600 | 21.887 | M-60 in Burlington | I-94 & M-96 near Battle Creek | 1998 | current | |
| M-331 | 3.363 | 5.412 | Kalamazoo–Portage city line | BL I-94/Bus. US 131/M-43 in Kalamazoo | 1998 | 2019 | Never signed, returned to local control; once was part of US 131 |
| M-343 | 7.928 | 12.759 | Riverview Drive in Kalamazoo | M-43/M-89 in Richland | 2019 | current | Previously part of M-43 |
| M-553 | 19.618 | 31.572 | M-35 near Gwinn | US 41/M-28 in Marquette | 1998 | current | Formerly CR 553 |
| M-554 | 0.852 | 1.371 | M-553 in Marquette | Division Street in Marquette | 1998 | 2005 | Never signed, returned to local control |
| M-700 | 5.545 | 8.924 | East Grand Boulevard & East Jefferson Avenue in Detroit | M-712 (Riverbank Drive) & M-708 (Inselruhe Avenue) in Belle Isle State Park | 2014 | current | Unsigned; includes the MacArthur Bridge connecting the park to the mainland and follows Sunset Drive, The Strand, Lakeside Drive, and Riverbank Drive |
| M-701 | 1.937 | 3.117 | M-704 (Casino Way) near the Belle Isle Casino | M-700 (Lakeside Drive) in Belle Isle State Park | 2014 | current | Unsigned; follows Central Avenue |
| M-702 | 0.286 | 0.460 | M-700 (The Strand) in Belle Isle State Park | M-700 (Sunset Drive) | 2014 | current | Unsigned; follows Fountain Way and includes Fountain Circle around the James Scott Memorial Fountain |
| M-703 | 0.126 | 0.203 | M-702 (Fountain Circle) in Belle Isle State Park | M-704 (Casino Way) | 2014 | current | Unsigned; follows third leg of Fountain Way |
| M-704 | 0.422 | 0.679 | M-700 (The Strand) in Belle Isle State Park | M-700 (Sunset Drive) | 2014 | current | Unsigned; follows Casino Way |
| M-705 | 1.293 | 2.081 | M-701 (Central Avenue) in Belle Isle State Park | M-700 (The Strand) | 2014 | current | Unsigned; follows Muse Road, Loiter Way, and Vista Avenue |
| M-706 | 0.130 | 0.209 | M-700 (The Strand) in Belle Isle State Park | M-705 (Loiter Way) | 2014 | current | Unsigned; follows southern segment of Picnic Way |
| M-707 | 0.354 | 0.570 | M-705 (Loiter Way) in Belle Isle State Park | M-712 (Riverbank Drive) | 2014 | current | Unsigned; follows northern segment of Picnic Way |
| M-708 | 0.403 | 0.649 | M-700 (The Strand) in Belle Isle State Park | M-700 & M-712 (Riverbank Drive) | 2014 | current | Unsigned; follows Inselruhe Avenue |
| M-709 | 0.861 | 1.386 | M-700 (Riverbank Drive) in Belle Isle State Park | M-700 (Riverbank Drive) | 2014 | current | Unsigned; follows Oakway Trail |
| M-710 | 0.632 | 1.017 | M-700 (The Strand) in Belle Isle State Park | M-700 (Lakeside Street) | 2014 | current | Unsigned; follows Woodside Drive |
| M-711 | 0.054 | 0.087 | M-701 (Central Avenue) in Belle Isle State Park | M-700 (Riverbank Drive) | 2014 | current | Unsigned; follows Vista Drive |
| M-712 | 0.514 | 0.827 | M-700 (Sunset Drive) in Belle Isle State Park | M-700 (Riverbank Drive) & M-708 (Inselruhe Avenue) | 2014 | current | Unsigned; follows Riverbank Drive |
Former

== Special routes ==
| Number | Length (mi) | Length (km) | Southern or western terminus | Northern or eastern terminus | Formed | Removed | Notes |
|---|---|---|---|---|---|---|---|
| Conn. M-13 | 2.414 | 3.885 | I-75/US 23 in Monitor Township | M-13 in Monitor Township | 1967 | current | Freeway near Bay City and Kawkawlin |
| Bus. M-17 | 6.275 | 10.099 | US 23/M-17 in Pittsfield Township | US 112 & M-17 in Ypsilanti Township | c. 1945 | 1956 | Replaced by M-17 |
| M-21A | 9.033 | 14.537 | M-21 and US 10 in Flint | M-15 and M-21 in Davison | 1929 | 1948 | |
| Byp. M-21 | 12.005 | 19.320 | Byp. US 16 & M-21 in Grandville | Byp. US 131 & M-21 in Grand Rapids Township | 1945 | 1953 | |
| Bus. M-21 | 6.749 | 10.861 | I-196/M-21 in Grandville | I-196/M-21 in Grand Rapids | 1953 | 1974 | Replaced by BS I-196 |
| Bus. M-24 | 6.754 | 10.870 | US 10/M-24 in Bloomfield Township | M-24 in Pontiac Township | 1940 | 1963 | Served Pontiac; replaced by BL I-75 |
| Bus. M-28 | 9.010 | 14.500 | M-28 in Pentland Township | M-28 in Pentland Township | 1936 | 1953 | Served Newberry; partially returned to local control, remainder is part of M-117 |
| Bus. M-28 | 4.873 | 7.842 | US 41/M-28 in Ishpeming | US 41/M-28 in Negaunee | 1958 | current | Part of US 41/M-28 bypassed in the 1930s |
| Bus. M-28 | 2.343 | 3.771 | US 41/M-28 in Marquette | US 41/M-28 in Marquette | 1975 | 1982 | Short-lived secondary designation for Bus. US 41; returned to local control in 2005 |
| Bus. M-32 | 0.738 | 1.188 | Old M-32 and Hillman Road in Hillman | Hillman Road in Hillman | c. 1927 | current | Business spur; also called Spur M-32 |
| Bus. M-43 | 2.423 | 3.899 | M-43 in Oneida Township | M-43 and M-100 in Grand Ledge | 1959 | 1968 | |
| Conn. M-44 | 4.196 | 6.753 | I-96/M-37 in Grand Rapids | M-44 in Plainfield Township | 1969 | current | Previously part of US 131 on Plainfield Avenue |
| Bus. M-50 | 11.084 | 17.838 | M-50 in Walker | I-96/M-50 in Grand Rapids Township | 1953 | 1961 | Replaced by M-50 |
| Truck M-51 | 1.238 | 1.992 | M-51/M-62 (Spruce Street) in Dowagiac | M-51 (North Front Street) in Dowagiac | — | — | Not state maintained; follows North Paul Street and West Prairie Ronde Street |
| Bus. M-54 | 14.767 | 23.765 | M-54 in Grand Blanc Township | M-54 in Mount Morris Township | 1962 | 1974 | Saginaw Street; returned to local Control |
| Bus. M-55 | 2.898 | 4.664 | US 27 & M-55 in Houghton Lake Heights | M-55 in Houghton Lake Heights | c. 1950 | 1961 | |
| Alt. M-60 | 1.671 | 2.689 | M-60 in Concord Township | M-60 in Concord | 1933 | 1934 | |
| Bus. M-60 | 2.554 | 4.110 | M-51 in Niles | M-60 in Howard Township | c. 1957 | current | Business spur |
| Bus. M-76 | 4.318 | 6.949 | M-76 in Horton Township | M-55/M-76 in Ogemaw Township | 1971 | 1973 | Replaced by BL I-75 in West Branch |
| Truck M-78 | 1.529 | 2.461 | US 27/M-78 in Lansing | US 27/M-78 in Lansing | c. 1936 | 1950 | |
| Bus. M-78 | 9.782 | 15.743 | I-96 & US 27/M-78 in Windsor Township | I-496/US 127 & M-78 in Lansing Township | 1963 | 1970 | Served Lansing |
| Spur M-130 | 1.138 | 1.831 | Muehleisen Road in Raisinville Township | M-130 in Raisinville Township | 1938 | c. 1955 | |
Former

== Connectors ==
Most of the following connectors are unsigned, but they were inventoried publicly as part of the 6th edition of the Michigan Geographic Framework in 2006. Up through the 7th edition, MDOT used a different numbering system, which was changed in May 2008 with the publication of the 8th edition. The years below note when each connector was established as an individual component of the highway system.

| Number | Length (mi) | Length (km) | Southern or western terminus | Northern or eastern terminus | Formed | Removed | Notes |
|---|---|---|---|---|---|---|---|
| Connector 3 | 0.724 | 1.165 | I-75 & I-375 in Detroit | M-3 in Detroit | 1968 | current | Part of the Fisher Freeway without a posted highway number; previously Connector 8 |
| Connector 5 | 0.836 | 1.345 | M-5 in Farmington Hills | I-696 in Farmington Hills | 1964 | current | Connector ramp between I-696 and M-5 in the I-96/I-275/I-696/M-5 interchange |
| Connector 13 | 2.414 | 3.885 | I-75/US 23 in Monitor Township | M-13 in Monitor Township | 1967 | current | Signed as Conn. M-13; previously Connector 14 |
| Connector 24 | 2.379 | 3.829 | US 24 in Brownstown Township | I-75 in Brownstown Township | 1973 | current | Part of Dix–Toledo Highway; labeled "I-75 connector" on state maps; previously part of US 25 and later Connector 3 |
| Connector 25 | 0.265 | 0.426 | BL I-69/BL I-94 in Port Huron | M-25 in Port Huron | 1973 | current | Labeled "I-94 connector" on state maps; previously part of US 25 and later Connector 13 |
| Connector 30 | 0.629 | 1.012 | I-94 in Roseville | M-3 in Roseville | 1963 | current | Previously Connector 10 |
| Connector 34 | 0.366 | 0.589 | M-34 in Adrian | US 223 in Adrian | 2003 | current | Industrial Drive |
| Connector 44 | 4.185 | 6.735 | I-96/M-37 in Plainfield Township | M-44 in Plainfield Township | 1969 | current | Signed as Conn. M-44 |
| Connector 58 | 0.557 | 0.896 | M-58 in Saginaw | I-675 in Saginaw | 1971 | current | Part of Hill Street and Michigan Avenue |
| Connector 69 | 0.935 | 1.505 | Lapeer Road in Port Huron Township | I-94/I-69 in Port Huron Township | 1966 | current | Labeled as "Lapeer Connector" on maps; replaced M-146; previously Connector 9 |
| Connector 75 | 2.992 | 4.815 | I-75 in Erie Township | M-125 in Erie Township | 1956 | current | Replaced part of US 24A; previously Connector 2 |
| Connector 85 | 0.219 | 0.352 | M-85 in Detroit | I-75 on the Detroit–Melvindale city line | 1956 | current | Schaefer Highway |
| Connector 96 | 2.365 | 3.806 | I-96 in Watertown Township | I-69 in Watertown Township | 1984 | current | Connector in the I-96/I-69 interchange |
| Connector 102 | 0.201 | 0.323 | M-10 in Detroit | M-102 on the Detroit–Southfield city line | 1963 | current | Part of Greenfield Road and Greenlodge Street; previously Connector 23 |
| Connector 104 | 0.326 | 0.525 | M-104 in Ferrysburg | US 31 in Ferrysburg | 1961 | current | Part of Pine Street and 3rd Street |
| Connector 125 | 0.572 | 0.921 | US 24 in Erie Township | M-125 in Erie Township | 1965 | current | Luna Pier Road, replaced part of M-151; previously Connector 1 |
| Connector 240 | 1.589 | 2.557 | I-75 in Taylor | US 24 in Taylor | 1963 | current | Previously Connector 4 |
| Connector 496 | 2.398 | 3.859 | I-496 & M-99 in Lansing | I-496 & BL I-96 in Lansing | 1989 | 2024 | Previously signed as the Capitol Loop; previously Connector 81 |
| Connector 850 | 0.127 | 0.204 | M-85 in Detroit | I-75 in Detroit | 1973 | current | Part of Clark Street; replaced part of US 25; previously Connector 7 |
Former
