= M146 =

M146 may refer to:

- M-146 (Michigan highway)
- M146 (Cape Town), a Metropolitan Route in Cape Town, South Africa
