= Fitch H. Beach Airport =

- IATA: none; ICAO: KFPK; FAA LID: FPK

Summary
- Airport type: Public
- Owner: City of Charlotte/City Manager
- Serves: Charlotte, Michigan
- Elevation AMSL: 891 ft (272 m)
- Coordinates: 42°34′28″N 084°48′41″W
- Website: charlottemi.gov/councilboards/airport-advisory-board/

Map
- Location of airport in Michigan FPK (the United States)

Runways
Direction	Length		Surface
Direction	ft	m	Surface
2/20	3,500	1,067	Concrete
14/32	2,318	707	Turf

Statistics (2021)
- Aircraft operations: 11,315
- Based aircraft: 18
- Source: Federal Aviation Administration

Fitch H. Beach Airport (ICAO: KFPK, FAA LID: FPK) is a city-owned, public-use airport located two nautical miles (3.7 km) northeast of the central business district of Charlotte, a city in Eaton County, Michigan, United States. It is included in the Federal Aviation Administration (FAA) National Plan of Integrated Airport Systems for 2017–2021, in which it is categorized as a local general aviation facility.

Although many U.S. airports use the same three-letter location identifier for the FAA and IATA, this airport is assigned FPK by the FAA and no designation from the IATA.

== Facilities and aircraft ==
Fitch H. Beach Airport covers an area of 190 acres (77 ha) at an elevation of 891 feet (272 m) above mean sea level. It has two runways: 2/20 is 3,500 by 75 feet (1,067 x 23 m) with a concrete surface; 14/32 is 2,318 by 100 feet (707 x 30 m) with a turf surface. Runway 14/32 is closed from December through March, and also when snow-covered. The airport is staffed daily from 8AM until dusk.

The airport has a fixed-base operator that offers general maintenance, courtesy transportation, pilot supplies, and more.

For the 12-month period ending December 31, 2021, the airport had 11,315 general aviation aircraft operations, an average of 31 per day. At that time there were 18 aircraft based at this airport: 16 single-engine and 2 multi-engine airplanes.

=== Transit ===
The airport is accessible by road from Island Highway, and is located near I-69 (exits 60 and 61), M-50, and M-79.

== Accidents and incidents ==
- On April 11, 2007, a Cessna 210 Centurion was damaged during a hard landing and runway excursion at the airport. The pilot reported a strong gust just above the runway that caused the aircraft to touch down hard and porpoise. Though the pilot attempted to add power, the nose wheel was damaged and lead the plane off the runway. The nose and left main landing gears subsequently collapsed. The probable cause of the incident was found to be the pilot's inadequate compensation for the wind conditions, inadequate landing flare, failure to maintain directional control, and encounter with a pilot-induced oscillation.

== See also ==
- List of airports in Michigan
