= Coldwater Township =

Coldwater Township may refer to the following places in the United States:

- Coldwater Township, Butler County, Iowa
- Coldwater Township, Comanche County, Kansas
- Coldwater Township, Branch County, Michigan
- Coldwater Township, Isabella County, Michigan
