= M-78 (Michigan highway) =

State highway in Michigan, United States

M-78
- M-78 highlighted in red

Route information
- Maintained by MDOT
- Length: 10.744 mi (17.291 km)
- Existed: c. July 1, 1919–present

Major junctions
- West end: M-66 north of Battle Creek
- East end: I-69 near Olivet

Location
- Country: United States
- State: Michigan
- Counties: Calhoun, Barry, Eaton

Highway system
- Michigan State Trunkline Highway System; Interstate; US; State; Byways
← M-77	→ M-79

M-78 is a state trunkline highway in the US state of Michigan. The western terminus is the intersection with M-66 north of Battle Creek in Pennfield Township. The roadway runs 10.744 miles (17.291 km) through rural farmland and the community of Bellevue as it approaches its eastern terminus at an interchange with Interstate 69 (I-69) near Olivet. The highway is used by between 3,100 and 5,300 vehicles on a daily basis.

When the state highway system was signed in 1919, M-78 followed a similar routing. At Bellevue, it turned northeast to terminate at Charlotte. In the 1920s, the highway was extended southerly to the Indiana state line near Sturgis and northeasterly into the Lansing area. In the 1930s, M-78 was extended further on its northern and eastern end to Flint. The highway was converted into a freeway in sections starting in the 1960s. During that decade, the southern extension from the 1920s was removed from M-78 and added to other state highways, and in the 1970s, the northeastern extensions, now mostly freeways, were removed from M-78 as well. Two special routes were created as a result of the various reroutings in the Lansing area, both of which are no longer part of the state highway system.

== Route description ==
M-78 begins at an intersection with M-66 in Pennfield Township, north of Battle Creek in Calhoun County. The trunkline passes through rural farm lands as it runs due east and northeast. It briefly crosses the southeast corner of Barry County as it enters Eaton County. There M-78 follows Battle Creek Highway past some small ponds and into the town of Bellevue. The trunkline becomes Capitol Avenue in town and turns south onto Main Street in the middle of the central business district. M-78 crosses a branch line of the Canadian National Railway before leaving town. Main Street turns easterly and becomes Butterfield Highway. M-78 crosses the Battle Creek River before terminating at I-69's exit 48 in Bellevue Township.

M-78 is maintained by the Michigan Department of Transportation (MDOT) like other state highways in Michigan. As a part of these maintenance responsibilities, the department tracks the volume of traffic that uses the roadways under its jurisdiction. These volumes are expressed using a metric called annual average daily traffic, which is a statistical calculation of the average daily number of vehicles on a segment of roadway. MDOT's surveys in 2010 showed that the highest traffic levels along M-78 were the 5,256 vehicles daily on Capitol Avenue in Bellevue; the lowest counts were the 3,176 vehicles per day in Calhoun County. No part of M-78 has been listed on the National Highway System, a network of roads important to the country's economy, defense, and mobility.

== History ==
When the original state highway system was designated c. July 1, 1919, M-78 ran along a route similar that of today. It started north of Battle Creek at a junction with then M-79 and cut through the corner of Barry County to Bellevue, but it turned northeasterly to end at Charlotte at a junction with M-29. By 1927, M-78 was extended southward, replacing M-79 to the Indiana state line, connecting with State Road 9 (SR 9) south of Sturgis. At the same time, a northerly addition extended the highway concurrently along US Highway 27 (US 27) to Dewitt and then solo to a junction with M-47 near Pittsburg. The section north of Lansing was changed in 1929. The section from Dewitt Pittsburg was redesignated M-104, and M-78 was extended through East Lansing to Haslett. By 1936, the highway was extended all the way into Flint to end at M-21. Around the same time, a second routing through downtown Lansing for US 27/M-78 was designated along Capitol Avenue; the former route along Main, Kalamazoo and Larch streets and Grand Avenue was given the Truck M-78 designation.

In the latter half of 1941 or the beginning of 1942, a section of the concurrent M-78/M-86 was rerouted west of Colon in St. Joseph County. In 1950, the bridge across the Grand River on Main Street was completed; after completion, the mainline M-78 was routed over the bridge and up Larch Street, replacing Truck M-78 in the process. The former car-only route on Capitol Avenue was removed from the state highway system. By the middle of 1960, the first section of freeway along M-78 was opened in the Lennon area. The next year, the freeway had been extended as far southwest as Durand from the end at Lennon. By the start of 1962, M-78 was a freeway from Perry at the junction with M-47 all the way to Swartz Creek near Flint.

On December 12, 1962, the I-96 freeway was completed around the south and west sides of Lansing, and a year later, the I-496 freeway was completed north into downtown from I-96. M-78 was rerouted from the I-96/US 27 interchange southwest of Lansing east along I-96 and then north on I-496. From there, M-78 followed the one-way pairing of Homer and Howard streets from the northern end of the freeway up to the one-way couplet of Saginaw Street and Grand River Avenue, returning to its previous routing. The former route through downtown along US 27 was redesignated Business M-78 (Bus. M-78) at the same time.

M-66 was extended southerly from Assyria through Battle Creek to the Indiana state line replacing sections of M-78 in 1965. The US 127 freeway was completed from Mason north to Lansing in 1966, adding the US 127 designation along the I-496/M-78 freeway. The next year, M-78's freeway was extended eastward to I-75/US 10/US 23 in Flint. The US 127/M-78 freeway was extended north of I-496 in 1969, and a discontinuous section of M-78 freeway east of Flint was completed around the same time frame. In 1970, the I-496 freeway was completed and the Bus. M-78 designation was removed through Lansing. In 1972, the highway was rerouted to run east of Bellevue to Olivet instead of northeast to Charlotte. The next year, all of M-78 northeast of Olivet was removed when I-69 between Charlotte and I-96 southwest of Lansing was completed; this truncation produced the modern routing of M-78 in the state.

== Major intersections ==
County	Location	mi	km	Destinations	Notes
Calhoun	Pennfield Township	0.000	0.000	M-66 – Battle Creek, Ionia	
Barry	No major junctions				
Eaton	Bellevue Township	10.744	17.291	I-69 – Fort Wayne, Lansing	Exit 48 on I-69
1.000 mi = 1.609 km; 1.000 km = 0.621 mi

== Related routes ==
=== Truck route ===
Truck M-78
- Location: Lansing
- Length: 1.529 mi (2.461 km)
- Existed: c. 1936–1950

Truck M-78 was a former truck route through the city of Lansing. It started at the corner of Capitol Avenue and Main Street and ran along Main Street to Grand Avenue. There, it turned north on Grand Avenue to Kalamazoo Street and turned east on Kalamazoo over the Grand River. At Larch Street, Truck M-78 continued north to rejoin the mainline at the corner of Larch and Saginaw streets.

By the middle of 1936, the US 27/M-78 routing through Lansing was split into two. The mainline was restricted to cars only and moved to run along Capitol Avenue. The former routing was restricted to trucks only and designed as a truck route. In 1950, the bridge for Main Street over the Grand River was completed and mainline US 27 was rerouted to use it to connect to Larch Street. From there north, US 27/M-78 followed Larch Street supplanting the truck route, which was decommissioned at that time.

=== Business route ===
Business M-78
- Location: Lansing
- Length: 9.782 mi (15.743 km)
- Existed: 1963–1970

Business M-78 (Bus. M-78) was a business loop through the city of Lansing. It ran from an interchange between US 27/M-78 and I-96 on the southwest side of Lansing along US 27 (Lansing Road) into downtown. From there, it ran east on Main Street and north on Larch Street. At Saginaw Street, Bus. M-78 turned east to reconnect to M-78.

The business loop was created in 1963 when M-78 was rerouted along the newly completed sections of the I-96 and I-496 freeways in the Lansing area. The designation was decommissioned in 1970 when I-496 was completed through downtown Lansing.
