= M-147 (Michigan highway) =

Former state highway in Blackman Township, Jackson County, Michigan, United States

M-147
- M-147 highlighted in red

Route information
- Maintained by MDOT
- Length: 0.505 mi (813 m)
- Existed: 1936–January 5, 1991

Major junctions
- West end: M-106 near Jackson
- East end: State Prison of Southern Michigan

Location
- Country: United States
- State: Michigan
- Counties: Jackson

Highway system
- Michigan State Trunkline Highway System; Interstate; US; State; Byways
| ← M-146 | → M-149 |

M-147 was a state trunkline highway in the U.S. state of Michigan. The route started at M-106 just north of Jackson and stopped at the entrance of State Prison of Southern Michigan. The route of M-147 was transferred to local control in 1991 after being signed originally in 1936.

== Route description ==
M-147 started at an intersection with M-106 west of the State Prison of Southern Michigan property. From there, the trunkline ran about a half mile (0.8 km) due east to the prison gate and terminated. Just east of the terminus was a branch line of the Grand Trunk Western Railroad. In 1976, a newspaper article said that "it's ... the second shortest highway on Michigan's state highway system, but for those who travel it one way, M-147 is the longest road in the world" in discussing its role as the connection to the state prison, the world's largest walled prison. Another in 1972, called it a "snippet of highway" that "most people hope they never have to travel" in a profile of short highways to "important places".

== History ==
M-147 was designated in 1936 to connect the prison property with the state trunkline system. It would remain under state control until January 5, 1991 when it was turned over to Jackson County.

== Major intersections ==
The entire highway was in Blackman Township, Jackson County.

| mi | km | Destinations | Notes |
|---|---|---|---|
| 0.000 | 0.000 | M-106 | |
| 0.505 | 0.813 | State Prison of Southern Michigan front gate | |
1.000 mi = 1.609 km; 1.000 km = 0.621 mi
