= M-227 (Michigan highway) =

State highway in Calhoun County, Michigan, United States

M-227
- M-227 highlighted in red

Route information
- Maintained by MDOT
- Length: 6.834 mi (10.998 km)
- Existed: October 1, 1998–present

Major junctions
- South end: I-69 south of Marshall
- North end: BL I-94 in Marshall

Location
- Country: United States
- State: Michigan
- Counties: Calhoun

Highway system
- Michigan State Trunkline Highway System; Interstate; US; State; Byways
← US 223	→ M-231

M-227 is a 6.834-mile (10.998 km) north–south state trunkline highway in the U.S. state of Michigan. It consists largely of a segment of old U.S. Highway 27 (US 27) along the south and west sides of Marshall. The highway passes the airport and serves an industrial section of town north of the Kalamazoo River. M-227 was created as a part of a program to add additional routes into the state's highway system under the leadership of Governor John Engler.

== Route description ==
M-227 starts at a diamond interchange with Interstate 69 (I-69) at exit 32 between Tekonsha and Marshall. From I-69, M-227 runs east on F Drive South north of Pine and Long lakes for approximately one mile (1.6 km). The highway runs through agricultural land and turns north to follow Old US 27/17 Mile Road. At Division Drive, M-227 passes into Marshall on Kalamazoo Avenue. The highway runs past the Brooks Field airport and the Alwin Downs Golf Course. Kalamazoo Avenue crosses the Kalamazoo River, and M-227 turns west along Industrial Road. This section of town is an industrial park, and M-227 curves north onto West Drive, crossing the Norfolk Southern Railroad. The northern terminus is BL I-94 (Michigan Avenue) on the west side of Marshall, near I-69. It lies only within Calhoun County and is entirely an undivided surface route.

Like other state highways in Michigan, M-227 is maintained by the Michigan Department of Transportation (MDOT). In 2011, the department's traffic surveys showed that on average, 8.408 vehicles used the highway daily in Marshall south of Industrial Dive and 1,862 vehicles did so each day along F Drive, the highest and lowest counts along the highway, respectively. No section of M-227 is listed on the National Highway System, a network of roads important to the country's economy, defense, and mobility.

== History ==
Before the completion of I-69 near Marshall in late 1967, US 27 followed 17 Mile Road and Kalamazoo Avenue into Marshall. That routing was turned back to local control after the completion of I-69 to I-94. M-227 came into existence nearly 35 years after the completion of I-69 in southern Michigan and, except for the section of old US 27, was long a collection of unnumbered local surface roads. It was designated as a part of Governor John Engler's Rationalization program on October 1, 1998 and first signed in 2001.

== Major intersections ==
The entire highway is in Calhoun County.

Location	mi	km	Destinations	Notes
Fredonia Township	0.000	0.000	I-69 – Coldwater, Lansing	Exit 32 on I-69
Marshall	6.834	10.998	BL I-94 (Michigan Avenue)	
1.000 mi = 1.609 km; 1.000 km = 0.621 mi
