= Hastings Charter Township, Michigan =

- Charter township
- Location within the state of Michigan
- Coordinates: 42°37′45″N 85°14′34″W
- Country: United States
- State: Michigan
- County: Barry

Area
  - Total: 30.5 sq mi (79.1 km^{2})
  - Land: 30.0 sq mi (77.7 km^{2})
  - Water: 0.54 sq mi (1.4 km^{2})
- Elevation: 837 ft (255 m)

Population (2020)
  - Total: 3,013
  - Density: 100/sq mi (38.8/km^{2})
- Time zone: UTC-5 (Eastern (EST))
  - Summer (DST): UTC-4 (EDT)
- ZIP code: 49058
- Area code: 269
- FIPS code: 26-37140
- GNIS feature ID: 1626449
- Website: www.hastingstownship.com

Hastings Charter Township is a charter township of Barry County in the U.S. state of Michigan. The population was 3,013 at the 2020 census. The township borders the city of Hastings on the north, east, and south.

== Geography ==
According to the United States Census Bureau, the township has a total area of 30.5 square miles (79.1 km^{2}), of which 30.0 square miles (77.7 km^{2}) is land and 0.54 square miles (1.4 km^{2}), or 1.74%, is water.

== Demographics ==
As of the census of 2000, there were 2,930 people, 1,015 households, and 798 families residing in the township. The population density was 97.1 inhabitants per square mile (37.5/km^{2}). There were 1,131 housing units at an average density of 37.5 per square mile (14.5/km^{2}). The racial makeup of the township was 98.19% White, 0.10% African American, 0.17% Native American, 0.10% Asian, 0.78% from other races, and 0.65% from two or more races. Hispanic or Latino of any race were 1.26% of the population.

There were 1,015 households, out of which 33.2% had children under the age of 18 living with them, 68.3% were married couples living together, 6.2% had a female householder with no husband present, and 21.3% were non-families. 16.8% of all households were made up of individuals, and 7.0% had someone living alone who was 65 years of age or older. The average household size was 2.74 and the average family size was 3.06.

In the township the population was spread out, with 24.8% under the age of 18, 6.8% from 18 to 24, 26.2% from 25 to 44, 26.2% from 45 to 64, and 15.9% who were 65 years of age or older. The median age was 40 years. For every 100 females, there were 98.4 males. For every 100 females age 18 and over, there were 94.9 males.

The median income for a household in the township was $51,316, and the median income for a family was $54,375. Males had a median income of $43,676 versus $29,643 for females. The per capita income for the township was $22,492. About 1.6% of families and 3.6% of the population were below the poverty line, including 0.8% of those under age 18 and 12.8% of those age 65 or over.
