= M-79 (Michigan highway) =

State highway in Michigan, United States

M-79
- M-79 highlighted in red

Route information
- Maintained by MDOT
- Length: 24.890 mi (40.057 km)
- Existed: c. July 1, 1919–present

Major junctions
- West end: M-37 southeast of Hastings
- M-66 south of Nashville
- East end: BL I-69 / M-50 in Charlotte

Location
- Country: United States
- State: Michigan
- Counties: Barry, Eaton

Highway system
- Michigan State Trunkline Highway System; Interstate; US; State; Byways
← M-78	→ M-80
← M-213	M-214	→ M-216

M-79 is an east–west state trunkline highway in the central portion of Lower Peninsula of the U.S. state of Michigan. The western terminus is about three miles (4.8 km) southeast of Hastings at the junction with M-37 and the eastern terminus is in downtown Charlotte at the junction with M-50 and Business Loop Interstate 69 (BL I-69). It passes through Quimby and Nashville, where there is a junction with M-66. The entire highway is undivided surface road. It has no direct access with Interstate 69 (I-69), although a sign for the highway is located on southbound I-69 at exit 61.

The highway was first designated in 1919 between Hastings and Battle Creek. It was later moved to run to Charlotte. A section of M-79 was designated as M-214 in the 1930s. M-214 would later be decommissioned as a highway designation and the M-79 designation was reapplied to the roadway.

== Route description ==
M-79 starts south of Hastings at a three-way intersection with M-37 in Hastings Township. The trunkline runs east and parallel to a section of the Thornapple River through wooded terrain that is interspersed with farm fields. South of Thornapple Lake, M-79 angles southeasterly moving from Quimby Road to Scott Road running parallel to the Thornapple River again into the community of Nashville. M-79 meets M-66 and turns south along the latter highway's route along Main and Durkee streets through the community. South of town in Maple Grove Township, M-79 separates from M-66 and turns east along Lawrence Road. Outside of Charlotte, M-79 curves southeast to transition to Lawrence Avenue through town. The eastern terminus is at an intersection with Cochran Avenue, which carries BL I-69 and M-50.

== History ==
M-79 was formed as a state trunkline by July 1, 1919 along part of its present routing. At the time, it ran between Hastings and Nashville as it does today. From Nashville, the trunkline turned south and west to end at the contemporary M-17 in Battle Creek. By 1927, the southernmost section of M-79 was truncated when M-78 was extended to Battle Creek. In late 1930, the southernmost section was shortened once again as a new M-14 designation replaced M-79 south of Nashville. An eastward extension of M-79 at the same time carries the highway designation to Vermontville.

M-79 was extended easterly to Charlotte in 1934 at the same time that the section of the trunkline between Nashville and Vermontville was redesignated M-214. M-79 was rerouted along Assyria and Lawrence roads at the time to connect the sections of M-79 on either side of M-214. By 1941, M-214 was shortened to a 3-mile (5 km) connector route in downtown Nashville running between M-79 and M-66. In 1953, M-79 replaced M-214 and the latter designation was retired from the highway system. The last section of gravel roadway in Eaton County was paved by 1960.

== Major intersections ==
County	Location	mi	km	Destinations	Notes
Barry	Hastings Township	0.000	0.000	M-37 – Grand Rapids, Battle Creek	
Barry	Nashville	9.280	14.935	M-66 north – Ionia	Northern end of M-66 concurrency
Barry	Maple Grove Township	11.572	18.623	M-66 south – Battle Creek	Southern end of M-66 concurrency
Eaton	Charlotte	24.890	40.057	BL I-69 / M-50 – Lake Odessa, Eaton Rapids	
1.000 mi = 1.609 km; 1.000 km = 0.621 mi: Concurrency terminus
