= M-146 (Michigan highway) =

Former state highway in St. Clair County, Michigan, United States

M-146
- M-146 highlighted in red on a modern map

Route information
- Maintained by MDOT
- Length: 0.910 mi (1,465 m)
- Existed: 1933–1966

Major junctions
- South end: M-21 in Port Huron
- North end: I-94 / US 25 in Port Huron Township

Location
- Country: United States
- State: Michigan
- Counties: St. Clair

Highway system
- Michigan State Trunkline Highway System; Interstate; US; State; Byways
← M-144	→ M-147

M-146 was a state trunkline highway in the US state of Michigan that initially served as a bypass for traffic going around Port Huron and as a short cut for traffic between U.S. Highway 25 (US 25) and M-21. Later it connected to the Blue Water Bridge before it was truncated to its final form. Segments of M-146 still exist today as state highways as part of Interstate 94 (I-94) and I-69 and the Lapeer Connector.

== Route description ==
As the highway last existed, its southern end was at an intersection with M-21 (Lapeer Road) in a residential area of Port Huron west of the Black River. Following what is today named the Lapeer Connector, M-146 ran northward for about 0.9 miles (1.4 km) to an interchange with I-94/US 25 where it terminated.

== History ==
When the route debuted in 1933 it served as a connector between US 25 in southwest Port Huron and M-21 along the west side of town. In 1954 a new approach was built from M-21 to the foot of the Blue Water Bridge, and M-146 was extended northward and easterly, designated along this new route. By 1958, this newer segment was converted to freeway specifications, and in 1964, with the completion of the I-94/US 25 freeway, M-146 was removed from that portion of the route. By the next year, the M-146 designation only remained along the stretch of freeway which now serves as the exit 274 interchange on I-94, and was removed from 24th Street through town. The alignment of the freeway stretch of M-146 was shifted slightly as well, allowing for a smoother transition between it and westbound I-94. In addition, the diamond interchange with Water Street along the Blue Water Bridge approach was reconstructed and appropriated into the alignment of I-94. In 1966, with the completion of a new freeway alignment for M-21 between Wadhams and downtown Port Huron, the M-146 designation was removed from the state trunkline system, and has not been used since. The connector between Lapeer Street and present-day I-94 is now known as the Lapeer Connector and Connector 69.

== Major intersections ==
The entire highway was in St. Clair County.

Location	mi	km	Destinations	Notes
Port Huron	0.000	0.000	M-21 (Lapeer Road)	Lapeer Road is no longer a state highway
Port Huron Township	0.910	1.465	I-94 / US 25 – Detroit	Now exit 274 on I-94/I-69
1.000 mi = 1.609 km; 1.000 km = 0.621 mi
