= M-213 (Michigan highway) =

M-213 was a state highway route designation in the U.S. state of Michigan that was used twice:

- M-213 (1959 Michigan highway), now part of B-35
- M-213 (1960 Michigan highway), now part of M-20

Browse numbered routes
← M-212	→ M-214
