= Bennington Township, Michigan =

- Civil township
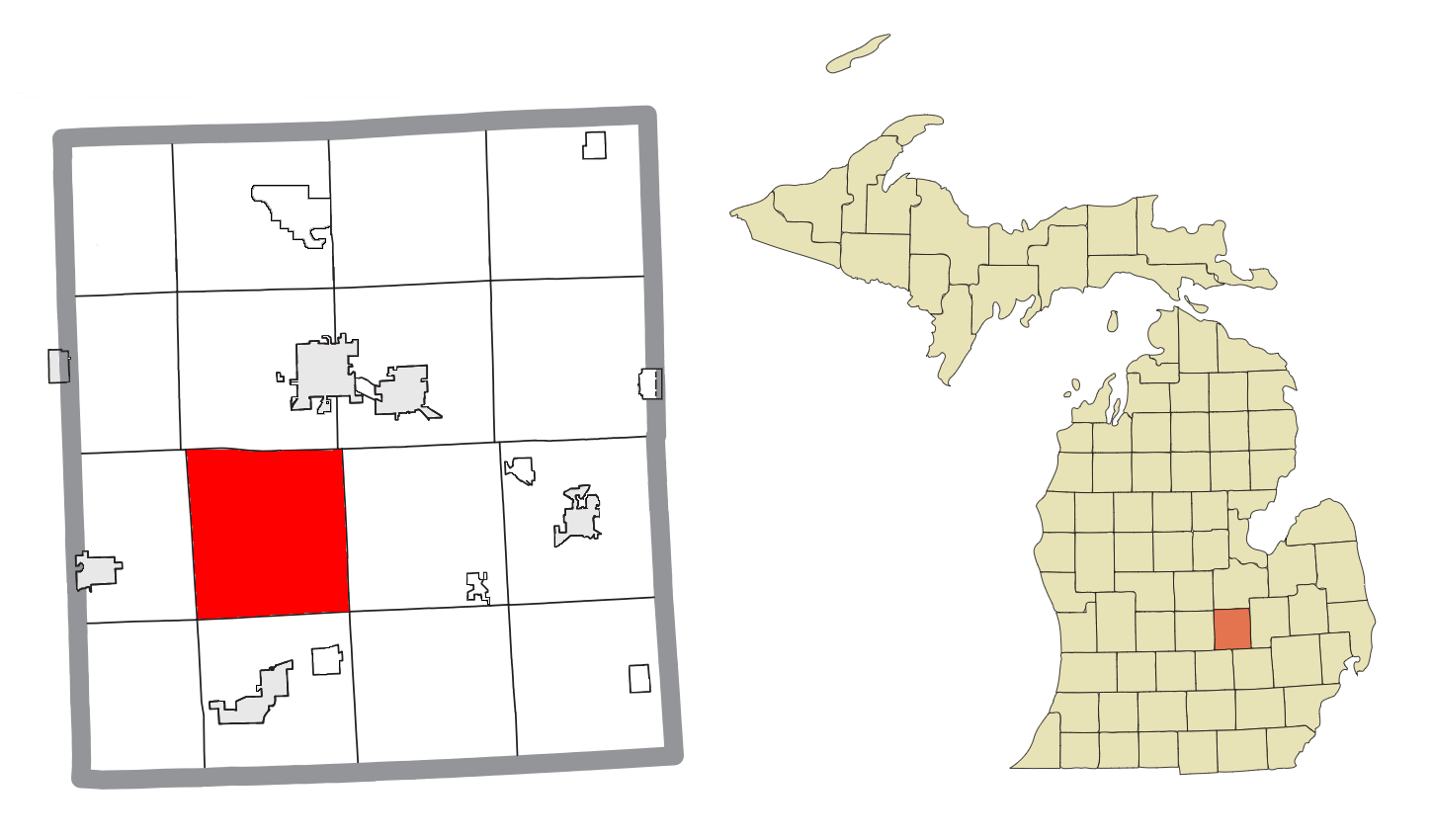
- Location within Shiawassee County

- Location within the state of Michigan Bennington Township (the United States)
- Coordinates: 42°55′10″N 84°13′04″W
- Country: United States
- State: Michigan
- County: Shiawassee
- Established: 1838

Government
  - Supervisor: Cody Baker
  - Clerk: Donna Ash

Area
  - Total: 36.81 sq mi (95.3 km^{2})
  - Land: 35.48 sq mi (91.9 km^{2})
  - Water: 1.33 sq mi (3.4 km^{2})
- Elevation: 823 ft (251 m)

Population (2020)
  - Total: 3,119
  - Density: 87.91/sq mi (33.94/km^{2})
- Time zone: UTC-5 (Eastern (EST))
  - Summer (DST): UTC-4 (EDT)
- ZIP code(s): 48848 (Laingsburg); 48857 (Morrice); 48867 (Owosso)
- Area code: 989
- FIPS code: 26-07280
- GNIS feature ID: 1625913
- Website: Official website

Bennington Township is a civil township of Shiawassee County in the U.S. state of Michigan. As of the 2020 census, the township population was 3,119. Bennington Township is the center of population of the state of Michigan.

The township was established in 1838 and was named after Bennington, Vermont, which was the former home of the first settlers in the area.

== Communities ==
- Bennington is an unincorporated community in the township. It is located at 42°56′07″N 84°14′31″W at Bennington and Ruess roads.
- Pittsburg is an unincorporated community in the township. Pittsburg was named for Moses Pitts, the original owner of the town site. It is located at latitude 42°53′33″N 84°13′19″W.

== History ==
The first government land purchase was made by Samuel Nichols, Israel Parsons and Benjamin Powers in 1835. Nichols became the first settler in Bennington.

At a location called Hartwellville, the first store was opened by Giles Tucker. In 1838, Johnathon M. Hartwell, formerly of Norwich, NY, took over from Tucker.

Bennington Township was organized on March 6, 1838, with the area of township area 5 North Range 2, the future Perry Township, split off from Shiawassee Township. The first township supervisor was Lemuel Castle. Perry Township was separated off by an act on March 15, 1841. A rail station was opened at the Bennington community.

On February 11, 1841, Hartwell became the first postmaster for the Hartwell post office. On December 13, 1848, a post office was opened in Bennington village with first postmaster Benjamin Davis.

By 1878, there was a hamlet called Alton in the township. Alton was 8/10 of a mile west of Morrice Road on Grand River Trail. The hamlet later abandoned becoming a ghost town.

The Hartwell family served as postmaster until the Hartwell office closed on January 15, 1901. Later Hartwellville was abandoned. The Bennington post office was discontinued on February 28, 1958.

== Geography ==
According to the United States Census Bureau, the township has a total area of 36.81 square miles (95.34 km^{2}), of which 35.48 square miles (91.89 km^{2}) is land and 1.33 square miles (3.44 km^{2}) (3.61%) is water.

Both the Maple and Looking Glass Rivers flow through Bennington Township.

== Demographics ==
As of the census of 2010, there were 3,168 people, 1,252 households, and 906 families residing in the township. The population density was 82.7 inhabitants per square mile (31.9/km^{2}). There were 1,252 housing units at an average density of 30.4 per square mile (11.7/km^{2}). The racial makeup of the township was 97.58% White, 0.17% African American, 0.30% Native American, 0.46% Asian, 0.53% from other races, and 0.96% from two or more races. Hispanic or Latino of any race were 1.72% of the population.

There were 1,252 households, out of which 35.8% had children under the age of 18 living with them, 75.5% were married couples living together, 5.9% had a female householder with no husband present, and 15.6% were non-families. 12.8% of all households were made up of individuals, and 4.5% had someone living alone who was 65 years of age or older. The average household size was 2.80 and the average family size was 3.05.

In the township the population was spread out, with 26.1% under the age of 18, 6.5% from 18 to 24, 29.4% from 25 to 44, 28.1% from 45 to 64, and 9.9% who were 65 years of age or older. The median age was 38 years. For every 100 females, there were 100.9 males. For every 100 females age 18 and over, there were 99.6 males.

The median income for a household in the township was $54,786, and the median income for a family was $61,564. Males had a median income of $40,465 versus $31,528 for females. The per capita income for the township was $21,841. About 2.3% of families and 3.1% of the population were below the poverty line, including 1.1% of those under age 18 and 4.6% of those age 65 or over.

== Highways ==
- I-69 is accessible via exit 105 about 2 miles (3.2 km) south of the township.
- M-52
