= Battle Creek River =

River in the United States of America

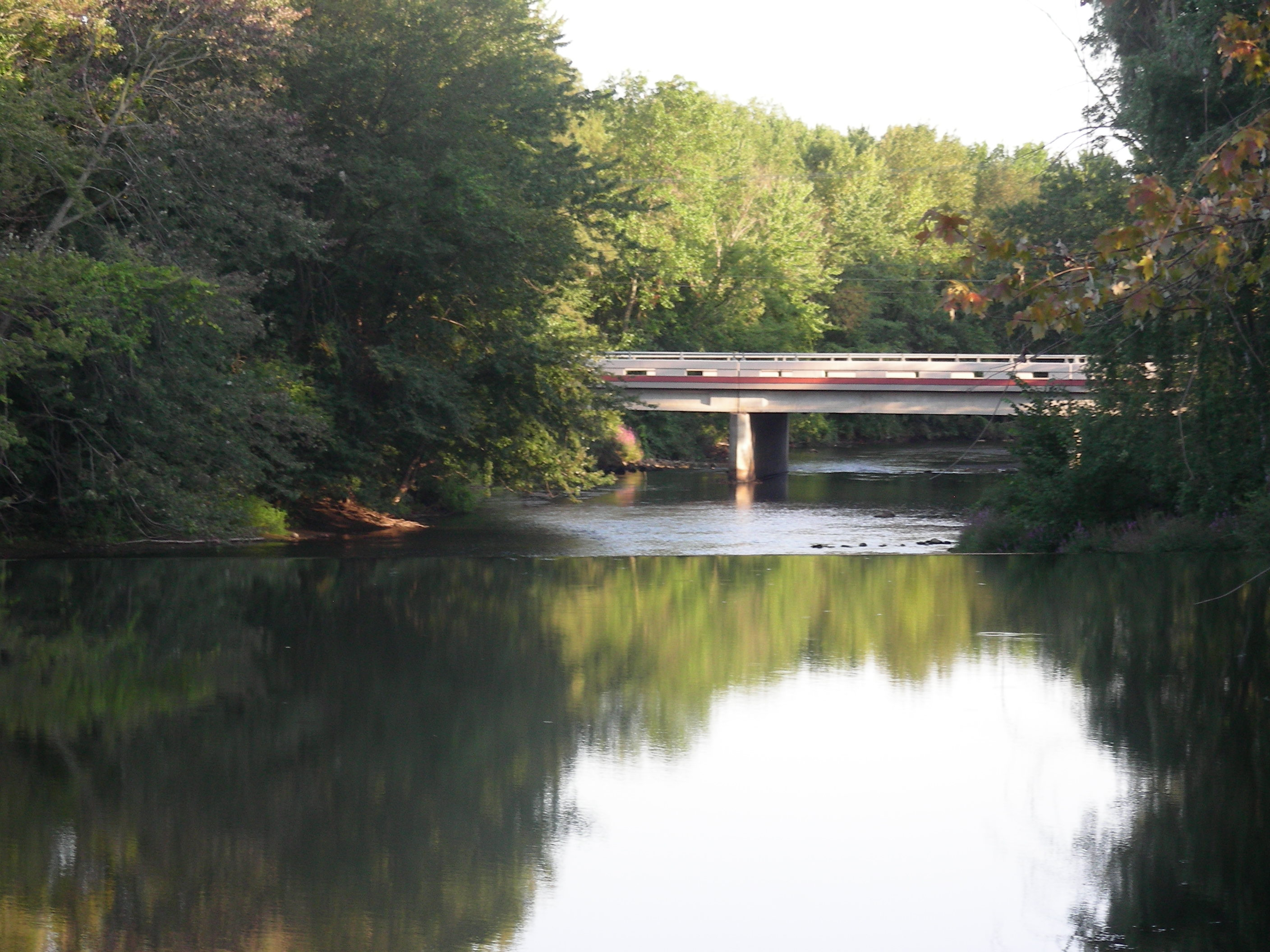
- Overlooking the Battle Creek River

Location
- Country: United States
- State: Michigan
- Counties: Eaton, Calhoun
- Municipalities: Charlotte, Bellevue, Battle Creek

Physical characteristics
- Source
  - location: Clarence Township
  - coordinates: 42.44226°N 84.77609°W
- Mouth: Kalamazoo River
  - location: Battle Creek
  - coordinates: 42.32254°N 85.193881°W
- Length: 54.5 mi (87.7 km)
- Basin size: 307 sq mi (800 km^{2})

The Battle Creek River (simply Battle Creek on federal maps) is a river in the U.S. state of Michigan. It is a tributary of the Kalamazoo River, joining it at Battle Creek, Michigan; the Kalamazoo River empties into Lake Michigan.

The river's drainage basin is approximately 196,750 acres (796.2 km^{2}) and covers northern Calhoun County, southern Eaton County, and southeastern Barry County in southwest Michigan. The headwaters of the Battle Creek River are at Duck Lake in Clarence Township in northeast Calhoun County, and the stream flows north to the city of Charlotte, then southwest through the village of Bellevue and empties into the Kalamazoo River at the city of Battle Creek. Tributaries of the Battle Creek River include Wanadoga Creek, Ellis Creek, Crooked Brook, Goose Creek, Ackley Creek, Indian Creek, and Big Creek. The river is 53.3 miles (85.8 km) long with an average gradient of 1.25 feet/mile.

== Toponym ==
The river's name, according to local lore, was given after a survey party, led by Col. John Mullet, engaged in hostilities with some local Native Americans in the winter of 1823–24.

== See also ==
- List of Michigan rivers
