= Coldwater Township, Branch County, Michigan =

Coldwater Township, Michigan
- Civil township
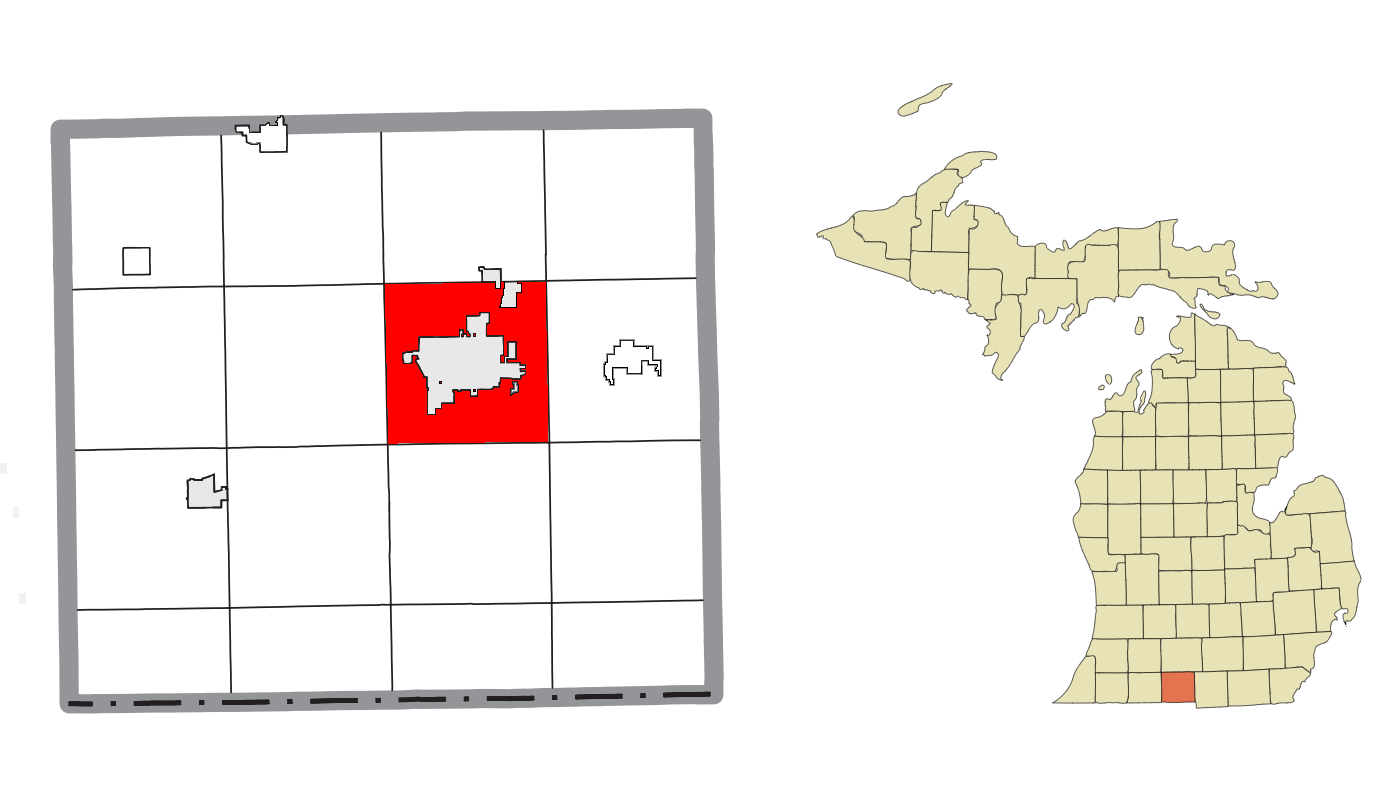
- Location within Branch County

- Location within the state of Michigan Location within the United States
- Coordinates: 41°57′26″N 85°00′21″W
- Country: United States
- State: Michigan
- County: Branch

Area
  - Total: 28.7 sq mi (74.4 km^{2})
  - Land: 27.5 sq mi (71.3 km^{2})
  - Water: 1.2 sq mi (3.0 km^{2})
- Elevation: 968 ft (295 m)

Population (2020)
  - Total: 3,406
  - Density: 124/sq mi (47.8/km^{2})
- Time zone: UTC-5 (Eastern (EST))
  - Summer (DST): UTC-4 (EDT)
- ZIP code: 49036
- Area code: 517
- FIPS code: 26-17040
- GNIS feature ID: 1626108
- Website: Official website

Coldwater Township is a civil township of Branch County in the U.S. state of Michigan. The population was 3,406 at the 2020 census.

The township surrounds the City of Coldwater, but the city is administratively autonomous. The city's urban area extends well into the township. The township contains no incorporated villages.

Interstate 69 and US 12 intersect at I-69 Exit 13 in the eastern part of the City of Coldwater. State highway M-86 has its eastern terminus at a junction with US 12 about 2 miles (3 km) west of the city.

== Geography ==
The Coldwater River flows north through the township, forming a series of lakes just west and north of the city. It is a tributary of the St. Joseph River, flowing to Lake Michigan.

According to the United States Census Bureau, Coldwater Township has a total area of 28.7 square miles (74.4 km^{2}), of which 27.5 square miles (71.3 km^{2}) is land and 1.2 square miles (3.0 km^{2}), or 4.09%, is water.

== Demographics ==
As of the census of 2000, there were 3,678 people, 1,426 households, and 1,048 families residing in the township. The population density was 134.3 inhabitants per square mile (51.9/km^{2}). There were 1,684 housing units at an average density of 61.5 per square mile (23.7/km^{2}). The racial makeup of the township was 97.09% White, 0.52% African American, 0.27% Native American, 0.60% Asian, 0.63% from other races, and 0.90% from two or more races. Hispanic or Latino of any race were 1.09% of the population.

There were 1,426 households, out of which 31.1% had children under the age of 18 living with them, 60.1% were married couples living together, 9.0% had a female householder with no husband present, and 26.5% were non-families. 22.3% of all households were made up of individuals, and 8.5% had someone living alone who was 65 years of age or older. The average household size was 2.50 and the average family size was 2.91.

In the township the population was spread out, with 23.8% under the age of 18, 7.1% from 18 to 24, 25.0% from 25 to 44, 27.3% from 45 to 64, and 16.9% who were 65 years of age or older. The median age was 41 years. For every 100 females, there were 97.4 males. For every 100 females age 18 and over, there were 93.8 males.

The median income for a household in the township was $44,360, and the median income for a family was $49,495. Males had a median income of $34,722 versus $24,938 for females. The per capita income for the township was $21,247. About 2.7% of families and 3.4% of the population were below the poverty line, including 3.1% of those under age 18 and 1.1% of those age 65 or over.
