= Michigan's 71st House of Representatives district =

American legislative district

Michigan's 71st State House of Representatives district
Representative
Brian BeGole; R–Antrim Township
- Demographics: 91.8% White; 1.1% Black; 3.3% Hispanic; 0.4% Asian; 0.1% Native American; 0.4% Other; 3% Multiracial
- Population (2024): 91,464

Michigan's 71st House of Representatives district (also referred to as Michigan's 71st House district) is a legislative district within the Michigan House of Representatives located in parts of Genesee, Saginaw and Shiawassee counties. The district was created in 1965, when the Michigan House of Representatives district naming scheme changed from a county-based system to a numerical one.

== List of representatives ==
Representative	Party	Dates	Residence	Notes
Bruce L. Monks	Democratic	1965–1966	Mount Clemens	
Allen F. Rush	Republican	1967–1968	Lake Orion	
Thomas Guastello	Democratic	1969–1974	Sterling Heights	Lived in Utica until around 1971.
Sal Rocca	Democratic	1975–1980	Sterling Heights	
Doug Cruce	Republican	1981–1982	Troy	
Sal Rocca	Democratic	1983–1992	Sterling Heights	
Frank M. Fitzgerald	Republican	1993–1998	Grand Ledge	
Susan L. Tabor	Republican	1999–2004	Delta Township	Lived in Lansing from 2001 to 2002.
Rick Jones	Republican	2005–2010	Grand Ledge	
Deb Shaughnessy	Republican	2011–2012	Charlotte	
Theresa Abed	Democratic	2013–2014	Charlotte	
Tom Barrett	Republican	2015–2018	Potterville	
Angela Witwer	Democratic	2019–2022	Lansing	
Brian BeGole	Republican	2023–present	Antrim Township	

== Recent elections ==
=== 2020s ===
2026 Michigan House of Representatives election
Party	Candidate	Votes	%
Republican	Brian BeGole (incumbent)	26,646	59.7
Democratic	Stephen Schlaack	17,987	40.3
Total votes		44,633	100
Republican hold			

2024 Michigan House of Representatives election
Party	Candidate	Votes	%
Republican	Brian BeGole	33,831	62.6
Democratic	Mark Zacharda	20,183	37.4
Total votes		54,014	100
Republican hold			

2022 Michigan House of Representatives election
Party	Candidate	Votes	%
Republican	Brian BeGole	25,156	57.7
Democratic	Mark Zacharda	18,408	42.3
Total votes		43,564	100
Republican hold			

2020 Michigan House of Representatives election
Party	Candidate	Votes	%
Democratic	Angela Witwer (incumbent)	28,200	51.2
Republican	Gina Johnsen	26,049	47.3
Green	Dalton R. McCuiston	807	1.5
Total votes		55,056	100
Democratic hold			

=== 2018 ===
2018 Michigan House of Representatives election
Party	Candidate	Votes	%
Democratic	Angela Witwer	21,990	50.8
Republican	Christine E. Barnes	21,299	49.2
Total votes		43,289	100
Democratic gain from Republican			

=== 2016 ===
2016 Michigan House of Representatives election
Party	Candidate	Votes	%
Republican	Tom Barrett	26,315	54.0
Democratic	Theresa Abed	20,926	43.0
Libertarian	Marc Lord	1,450	3.0
Total votes		48,691	100
Republican hold			

=== 2014 ===
2014 Michigan House of Representatives election
Party	Candidate	Votes	%
Republican	Tom Barrett	17,715	50.4
Democratic	Theresa Abed	17,405	49.6
Total votes		35,120	100
Republican gain from Democratic			

=== 2012 ===
2012 Michigan House of Representatives election
Party	Candidate	Votes	%
Democratic	Theresa Abed	24,822	53.4
Republican	Deb Shaughnessy	21,637	46.6
Total votes		46,459	100
Democratic gain from Republican			

=== 2010 ===
2010 Michigan House of Representatives election
Party	Candidate	Votes	%
Republican	Deb Shaughnessy	24,674	59.2
Democratic	Theresa Abed	17,014	40.8
Total votes		41,688	100
Republican hold			

=== 2008 ===
2008 Michigan House of Representatives election
Party	Candidate	Votes	%
Republican	Rick Jones	29,169	58.1
Democratic	Mark Eagle	21,063	41.9
Total votes		50,232	100
Republican hold			

== Historical district boundaries ==
Map	Description	Apportionment Plan	Notes
	Macomb County (part): Armada Township; Bruce Township; Clinton Township (part); Macomb Township; Ray Township; Shelby Township; Sterling Township; Utica; Washington Township	1964 Apportionment Plan	
	Macomb County (part): Utica; Sterling Heights (part); Warren (part); Oakland County (part): Troy (part)	1972 Apportionment Plan	
	Macomb County (part): Sterling Heights (part)	1982 Apportionment Plan	
	Eaton County (part): Bellevue Township; Benton Township; Brookfield Township; Carmel Township; Charlotte; Chester Township; Delta Charter Township; Eaton Rapids Township; Eaton Township; Grand Ledge; Kalamo Township; Lansing (part); Olivet; Oneida Charter Township; Potterville; Roxand Township; Sunfield Township; Vermontville Township; Walton Township; Windsor Charter Township	1992 Apportionment Plan	
	Eaton County (part): Bellevue Township; Benton Township; Carmel Township; Charlotte; Chester Township; Delta Charter Township; Eaton Rapids Township; Eaton Township; Grand Ledge (part); Kalamo Township; Lansing (part); Olivet; Oneida Charter Township; Potterville; Roxand Township; Sunfield Township; Vermontville Township; Walton Township; Windsor Charter Township	2001 Apportionment Plan	
	Eaton County (part): Bellevue Township; Benton Township; Carmel Township; Charlotte; Chester Township; Delta Charter Township; Eaton Rapids Township; Eaton Township (part); Grand Ledge (part); Kalamo Township; Lansing (part); Olivet; Oneida Charter Township; Potterville; Roxand Township; Sunfield Township; Vermontville Township; Walton Township; Windsor Charter Township	2011 Apportionment Plan	
