= Michigan's 7th congressional district =

U.S. House district for Michigan

Coordinates: 42°05′37″N 84°18′18″W

- Interactive map of district boundaries since January 3, 2023
- Representative: Tom Barrett; R–Charlotte
- Population (2025): 790,859
- Median household income: $87,551
- Ethnicity: 79.9% White; 5.9% Black; 5.7% Hispanic; 4.6% Two or more races; 3.2% Asian; 0.7% other
- Cook PVI: EVEN

Michigan's 7th congressional district is a United States congressional district in Southern Michigan and portions of Central Michigan. The current district, drawn in 2022, centers around Lansing, Michigan's state capital, and includes all of Clinton, Shiawassee, Ingham, and Livingston counties, most of Eaton County, and slivers of Genesee and Oakland counties.

The district is currently represented by Republican Tom Barrett. The previous incarnation of this district was represented by Republican Tim Walberg. Much of the old 7th is now the 5th district. Meanwhile, the current 7th is essentially the successor to what was the 8th district.

The district was identified as a presidential bellwether by Sabato's Crystal Ball, having voted for the Electoral College winner in the past five presidential elections as of 2024.

== Composition ==
For the 118th and successive Congresses (based on redistricting following the 2020 census), the district contains all or portions of the following counties and municipalities:

Clinton County (28)

All 28 municipalities

Eaton County (23)

Bellevue, Bellevue Township, Benton Township, Brookfield Township, Carmel Township, Charlotte, Chester Township, Delta Charter Township, Dimondale, Eaton Rapids, Eaton Rapids Township, Eaton Township, Grand Ledge (shared with Clinton County), Hamlin Township, Kalamo Township (part; also 2nd), Lansing (shared with Clinton and Ingham counties), Mulliken, Olivet, Oneida Township, Potterville, Roxand Township, Walton Township, Windsor Charter Township

Genesee County (1)

Argentine Township (part; also 8th)

Ingham County (24)

All 24 municipalities

Livingston County (21)

All 21 municipalities

Oakland County (4)

Lyon Charter Township, Milford (part; also 9th), Milford Charter Township (part; also 9th), South Lyon

Shiawassee County (28)

All 28 municipalities

== Recent election results from statewide races ==
| Year | Office | Results |
|---|---|---|
| 2008 | President | Obama 54% - 44% |
| 2012 | President | Obama 51% - 48% |
| 2014 | Senate | Peters 53% - 43% |
| 2014 | Governor | Snyder 53% - 45% |
| 2014 | Secretary of State | Johnson 57% - 39% |
| 2014 | Attorney General | Schuette 56% - 40% |
| 2016 | President | Trump 49% - 45% |
| 2018 | Senate | Stabenow 51% - 47% |
| 2018 | Governor | Whitmer 53% - 44% |
| 2018 | Attorney General | Leonard 48.0% - 47.6% |
| 2020 | President | Biden 50% - 49% |
| 2020 | Senate | James 49.2% - 49.1% |
| 2022 | Governor | Whitmer 54% - 44% |
| 2022 | Secretary of State | Benson 55% - 42% |
| 2022 | Attorney General | Nessel 53% - 45% |
| 2024 | President | Trump 50% - 49% |
| 2024 | Senate | Slotkin 49% - 48% |

== History ==
The 7th congressional district was formed in 1872 covering the Thumb of Michigan. It had Tuscola, Huron, Sanilac, Lapeer, St. Clair, and Macomb Counties. In 1882 Tuscola County was removed from the district but everything else remained the same. In 1892 Grosse Point and Hamtramck Townships, the latter one today mainly within the city boundaries of Detroit were moved into the 7th district.

In 1912 Tuscola County was put back in the 7th district, but it may have lost its Wayne County areas. It was definitely deprived of these areas by 1932. In 1964 the 7th district experienced its most drastic redistricting yet. Only Lapeer County was retained from the old district while Genesee County was added. In 1972 the district was redrawn again, losing Lapeer County as well as a few outlying parts of Genesee County. In 1982 most of Lapeer County was put back in the 7th district. The northern tier of townships in Genesee County were moved to the 8th district. Burns Township in Shiawasee County and all the northern tier of townships in Oakland County with the exception of Brandon Township were also put in the district.

After 1992 this old 7th district constituted a large part of the new 9th district. Meanwhile, the 7th was redrawn to cover territory from six districts in the 1983 map. Most of the population came from the old 3rd district, while most of the area came from the old 2nd district. Some of John Dingell's old 16th district was also included.

All of Eaton and Calhoun Counties were preserved from the 3rd to the 7th district. Half of the area of Barry County that had been in the old 3rd was retained. All of Hillsdale County, a portion of Branch County, the southwestern portion of Washtenaw County and western Lenawee County, and most of Jackson County were taken from the old 2nd district. From the old 4th was drawn most of Branch County. Even though most of the area of the old 2nd was put in the new 7th, most of its population was moved into the 13th, from Ann Arbor to Plymouth, Livonia, and Northville. The portion of Lenawee County that had been in the 16th was absorbed, and a small part of the Washtenaw County area of the 15th district and the part of the old 6th that had been in Jackson County.

The 2002 redistricting is best seen as a shift from the 3rd district to the 2nd district legacy. With the loss of its quadrant in Barry County and a small section of Calhoun County, the district lost affinity to the 3rd of yore. It took back the portion of Washtenaw County that had been lost to the 8th district, and shed the part of Washtenaw County that had come from the old 15th district. Although none of Wayne County was included in the new district, it did have Salem Township which not only borders Wayne County but is largely in a Wayne County-headquartered school district. From 2004 to 2013, the district contained all of Branch, Eaton, Hillsdale, Jackson, and Lenawee counties, and included most of Calhoun and much of western and northern Washtenaw counties.

In the 2012 redistricting, the district gained Monroe County as well as the portion of Washtenaw County around Saline.

== List of members representing the district ==
| Representative | Party | Years | Cong ress | Election history |
|---|---|---|---|---|
District created March 4, 1873
| Omar D. Conger (Port Huron) | Republican | March 4, 1873 – March 3, 1881 | 43rd 44th 45th 46th | Redistricted from the 5th district and re-elected in 1872. Re-elected in 1874. Re-elected in 1876. Re-elected in 1878. Re-elected in 1880. Resigned when elected U.S. Senator. |
| Vacant | | March 4, 1881 – April 5, 1881 | 47th | |
| John T. Rich (Elba) | Republican | April 5, 1881 – March 3, 1883 | 47th | Elected to finish Conger's term. Lost re-election. |
| Ezra C. Carleton (Port Huron) | Democratic | March 4, 1883 – March 3, 1887 | 48th 49th | Elected in 1882. Re-elected in 1884. Retired. |
| Justin Rice Whiting (St. Clair) | Democratic | March 4, 1887 – March 3, 1895 | 50th 51st 52nd 53rd | Elected in 1886. Re-elected in 1888. Re-elected in 1890. Re-elected in 1892. Retired. |
| Horace G. Snover (Port Austin) | Republican | March 4, 1895 – March 3, 1899 | 54th 55th | Elected in 1894. Re-elected in 1896. Retired. |
| Edgar Weeks (Mount Clemens) | Republican | March 4, 1899 – March 3, 1903 | 56th 57th | Elected in 1898. Re-elected in 1900. Lost renomination. |
| Henry McMorran (Port Huron) | Republican | March 4, 1903 – March 3, 1913 | 58th 59th 60th 61st 62nd | Elected in 1902. Re-elected in 1904. Re-elected in 1906. Re-elected in 1908. Re-elected in 1910. Retired. |
| Louis C. Cramton (Lapeer) | Republican | March 4, 1913 – March 3, 1931 | 63rd 64th 65th 66th 67th 68th 69th 70th 71st | Elected in 1912. Re-elected in 1914. Re-elected in 1916. Re-elected in 1918. Re-elected in 1920. Re-elected in 1922. Re-elected in 1924. Re-elected in 1926. Re-elected in 1928. Lost renomination. |
| Jesse P. Wolcott (Port Huron) | Republican | March 4, 1931 – January 3, 1957 | 72nd 73rd 74th 75th 76th 77th 78th 79th 80th 81st 82nd 83rd 84th | Elected in 1930. Re-elected in 1932. Re-elected in 1934. Re-elected in 1936. Re-elected in 1938. Re-elected in 1940. Re-elected in 1942. Re-elected in 1944. Re-elected in 1946. Re-elected in 1948. Re-elected in 1950. Re-elected in 1952. Re-elected in 1954. Retired. |
| Robert J. McIntosh (Port Huron) | Republican | January 3, 1957 – January 3, 1959 | 85th | Elected in 1956. Lost re-election. |
| James G. O'Hara (Utica) | Democratic | January 3, 1959 – January 3, 1965 | 86th 87th 88th | Elected in 1958. Re-elected in 1960. Re-elected in 1962. Redistricted to the 12th district. |
| John C. Mackie (Flint) | Democratic | January 3, 1965 – January 3, 1967 | 89th | Elected in 1964. Lost re-election. |
| Donald Riegle (Flint) | Republican | January 3, 1967 – February 27, 1973 | 90th 91st 92nd 93rd 94th | Elected in 1966. Re-elected in 1968. Re-elected in 1970. Re-elected in 1972. Elected as a Republican and changed political affiliation in 1973. |
| Donald Riegle (Flint) | Democratic | February 27, 1973 – December 30, 1976 | 90th 91st 92nd 93rd 94th | Re-elected in 1974. Retired to run for U.S. Senator and resigned following early appointment. |
| Vacant | | December 30, 1976 – January 3, 1977 | 94th | |
| Dale Kildee (Flint) | Democratic | January 3, 1977 – January 3, 1993 | 95th 96th 97th 98th 99th 100th 101st 102nd | Elected in 1976. Re-elected in 1978. Re-elected in 1980. Re-elected in 1982. Re-elected in 1984. Re-elected in 1986. Re-elected in 1988. Re-elected in 1990. Redistricted to the 9th district. |
| Nick Smith (Addison) | Republican | January 3, 1993 – January 3, 2005 | 103rd 104th 105th 106th 107th 108th | Elected in 1992. Re-elected in 1994. Re-elected in 1996. Re-elected in 1998. Re-elected in 2000. Re-elected in 2002. Retired. |
| Joe Schwarz (Battle Creek) | Republican | January 3, 2005 – January 3, 2007 | 109th | Elected in 2004. Lost renomination. |
| Tim Walberg (Tipton) | Republican | January 3, 2007 – January 3, 2009 | 110th | Elected in 2006. Lost re-election. |
| Mark Schauer (Battle Creek) | Democratic | January 3, 2009 – January 3, 2011 | 111th | Elected in 2008. Lost re-election. |
| Tim Walberg (Tipton) | Republican | January 3, 2011 – January 3, 2023 | 112th 113th 114th 115th 116th 117th | Elected again in 2010. Re-elected in 2012. Re-elected in 2014. Re-elected in 2016. Re-elected in 2018. Re-elected in 2020. Redistricted to the 5th district. |
| Elissa Slotkin (Lansing) | Democratic | January 3, 2023 – January 3, 2025 | 118th | Redistricted from the 8th district and re-elected in 2022. Retired to run for U.S. Senator. |
| Tom Barrett (Charlotte) | Republican | January 3, 2025 – present | 119th | Elected in 2024. Lost re-election. |
| William Lawrence (Lansing) | Democratic | Assuming office on January 3, 2027 | | Elected in 2026. |

== Recent election results ==
=== 2012 ===
Michigan's 7th congressional district, 2012
| Party | Candidate | Votes | % |
|---|---|---|---|
| Republican | Tim Walberg (incumbent) | 169,668 | 53.3 |
| Democratic | Kurt R. Haskell | 136,849 | 43.0 |
| Libertarian | Ken Proctor | 8,088 | 2.6 |
| Green | Richard Wunsch | 3,464 | 1.1 |
| Total votes | | 318,069 | 100.0 |
| Republican hold | | | |

=== 2014 ===
Michigan's 7th congressional district, 2014
| Party | Candidate | Votes | % |
|---|---|---|---|
| Republican | Tim Walberg (incumbent) | 119,564 | 53.4 |
| Democratic | Pam Byrnes | 92,083 | 41.2 |
| Libertarian | Ken Proctor | 4,531 | 2.0 |
| Independent | David Swartout | 4,369 | 2.0 |
| U.S. Taxpayers' | Rick Strawcutter | 3,138 | 1.4 |
| Total votes | | 223,685 | 100.0 |
| Republican hold | | | |

=== 2016 ===
Michigan's 7th congressional district, 2016
| Party | Candidate | Votes | % |
|---|---|---|---|
| Republican | Tim Walberg (incumbent) | 184,321 | 55.1 |
| Democratic | Gretchen Driskell | 134,010 | 40.0 |
| Libertarian | Ken Proctor | 16,476 | 4.9 |
| Total votes | | 334,807 | 100.0 |
| Republican hold | | | |

=== 2018 ===
Michigan's 7th congressional district, 2018
| Party | Candidate | Votes | % |
|---|---|---|---|
| Republican | Tim Walberg (incumbent) | 158,730 | 53.8 |
| Democratic | Gretchen Driskell | 136,330 | 46.2 |
| Total votes | | 295,060 | 100.0 |
| Republican hold | | | |

=== 2020 ===
Michigan's 7th congressional district, 2020
| Party | Candidate | Votes | % |
|---|---|---|---|
| Republican | Tim Walberg (incumbent) | 227,524 | 58.7 |
| Democratic | Gretchen Driskell | 159,743 | 41.3 |
| Total votes | | 387,627 | 100.0 |
| Republican hold | | | |

=== 2022 ===
Michigan's 7th congressional district, 2022
| Party | Candidate | Votes | % |
|---|---|---|---|
| Democratic | Elissa Slotkin (incumbent) | 192,809 | 51.7 |
| Republican | Tom Barrett | 172,624 | 46.3 |
| Libertarian | Leah Dailey | 7,275 | 1.9 |
| Total votes | | 372,708 | 100.0 |
| Democratic hold | | | |

=== 2024 ===
Michigan's 7th congressional district, 2024
| Party | Candidate | Votes | % |
|---|---|---|---|
| Republican | Tom Barrett | 226,694 | 50.3 |
| Democratic | Curtis Hertel Jr. | 209,842 | 46.6 |
| Libertarian | Leah Dailey | 14,226 | 3.2 |
| Total votes | | 450,762 | 100.0 |
| Republican gain from Democratic | | | |

== Historical district boundaries ==
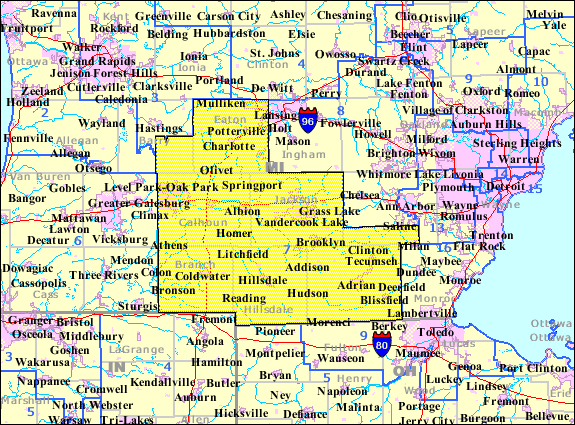
1993–2003

2003–2013

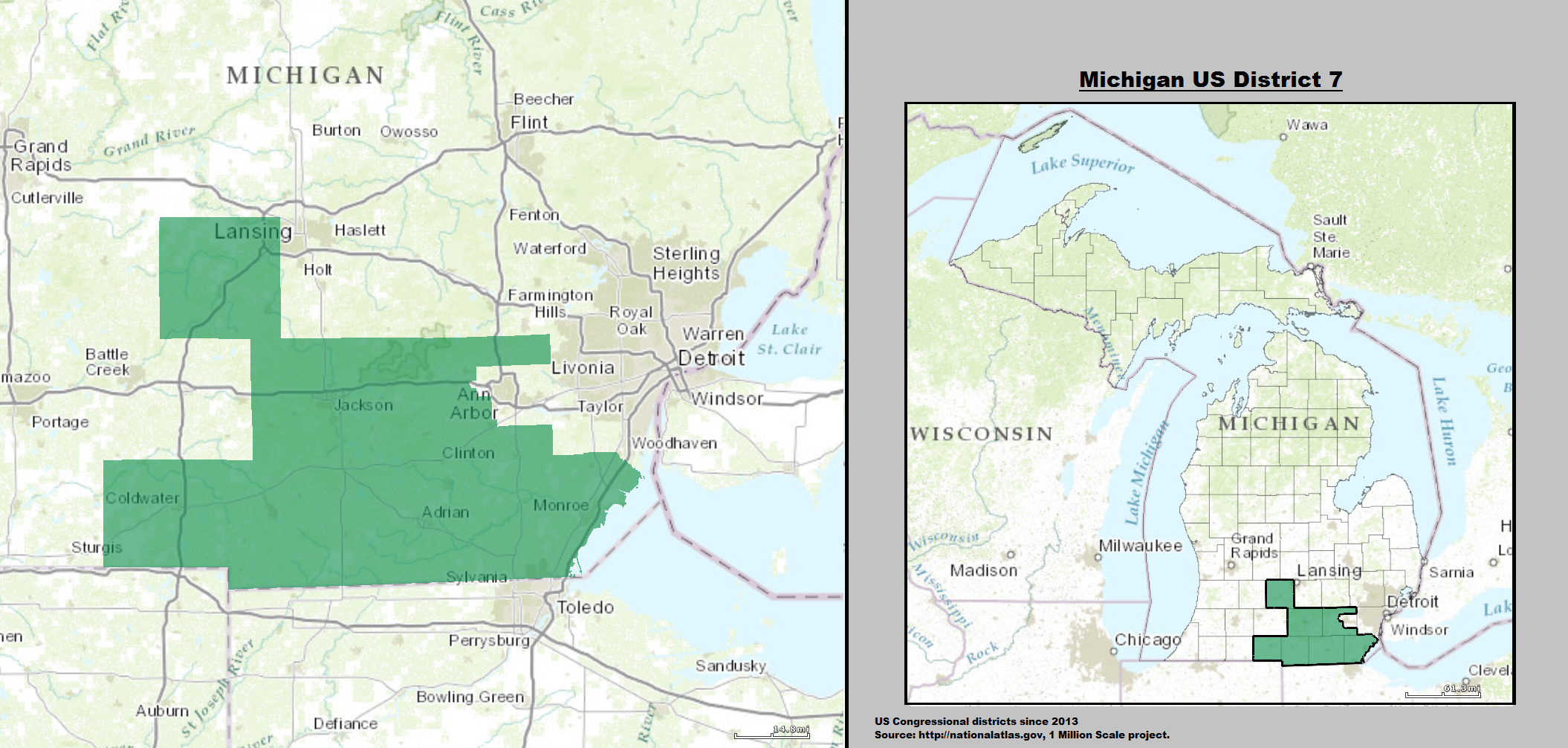
2013–2023

== See also ==
- Michigan's congressional districts
- List of United States congressional districts
