= Olivet Community Schools =

Public school district in Olivet, Michigan

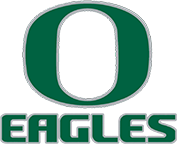

Address
- 255 First Street Olivet, Eaton County, Michigan, 49076; United States
- Coordinates: 42°26′48″N 84°55′01″W

District information
- Grades: Pre-Kindergarten-12
- Superintendent: Dan Gilbertson
- Schools: 3
- Budget: $19,486,000 2022-2023 expenditures
- NCES District ID: 2626370

Students and staff
- Students: 1,239 (2024-2025)
- Teachers: 74.13 (on an FTE basis) (2024-2025)
- Staff: 173.73 FTE (2024-2025)
- Student–teacher ratio: 16.71 (2024-2025)
- Athletic conference: CAAC
- District mascot: Eagles
- Colors: Green and white

Other information
- Website: www.olivetschools.org

Olivet Community Schools is a public school district in Michigan. In Eaton County, it serves Olivet, Walton Township, and parts of the townships of Bellevue, Brookfield, Carmel, and Kalamo In Calhoun County, it serves parts of the townships of Clarence, Convis, and Lee.

== History ==
The former Olivet High School was built in 1922. It originally contained all grades in the district. It was remodeled into apartments around 1996.

A new elementary school was built in late 1958. It was named after Fern Persons, a long-serving elementary principal, in 1964.

Olivet Middle School was built in 1972, and it became the middle/high school in 1993. The architect was Vander Meiden Koteles and Associates of Grand Haven, Michigan. The auditorium was built around 2005. Local artist Karl Weaver made two stained-glass windows for the auditorium's entrance.

== Schools ==
Schools in Olivet Public Schools
School	Address	Notes
Olivet High School	255 First Street, Olivet	Grades 9–12.
Olivet Middle School	255 First Street, Olivet	Grades 4–8. Shares a building with Olivet High School. Built 1972.
Fern Persons Elementary	4425 West Butterfield Highway, Olivet	Grades PreK-3. Built 1958.
