= Michigan's 24th Senate district =

American legislative district

Michigan's 24th State Senate district
Senator
Ruth Johnson; R–Groveland Township
- Demographics: 87.4% White; 1.4% Black; 4.5% Hispanic; 2.6% Asian; 0.1% Native American; 0.1% Hawaiian/Pacific Islander; 0.6% Other; 3.4% Multiracial
- Population (2024): 262,107

Michigan's 24th Senate district is one of 38 districts in the Michigan Senate. The 24th district was created by the 1850 Michigan Constitution, as the 1835 constitution only permitted a maximum of eight senate districts. It has been represented by Republican Ruth Johnson since 2023, succeeding fellow Republican Tom Barrett.

== Geography ==
District 24 encompasses parts of Genesee, Lapeer, Macomb and Oakland counties.

=== 2011 Apportionment Plan ===
District 24, as dictated by the 2011 Apportionment Plan, surrounded Lansing, and covered all of Clinton, Eaton, and Shiawassee Counties and parts of eastern Ingham County. Communities in the district included Charlotte, Grand Ledge, Eaton Rapids, Potterville, Waverly, DeWitt, St. Johns, Corunna, Durand, Owosso, Williamston, Delta Township, Bath Township, DeWitt Township, and small parts of East Lansing and Lansing proper.

The district overlapped with Michigan's 4th, 7th, and 8th congressional districts, and with the 65th, 67th, 69th, 71st, 85th, and 93rd districts of the Michigan House of Representatives.

== List of senators ==
Senator	Party	Dates	Residence	Notes
Truman H. Lyon	Democratic	1853–1854	Grand Rapids	
Wilder D. Foster	Republican	1855–1856	Grand Rapids	
James Seymour	Republican	1857–1858	Flushing	
Alexander P. Davis	Republican	1859–1860	Flint	
Elbridge E. Gale	Republican	1861–1862	Goodrich	
Henry H. Crapo	Republican	1863–1864	Flint	
Alexander P. Davis	Republican	1865–1866	Flint	
William Sanborn	Republican	1867–1868	Port Huron	
Bela W. Jenks	Republican	1869–1872	St. Clair	
Harrison H. Wheeler	Republican	1873–1874	Wenona	Resigned.
John D. Lewis	Republican	1874	Bay City	
Townsend North	Republican	1875–1876	Vassar	
Franklin S. Freeman	Republican	1877–1878	Ionia	
Joseph P. Shoemaker	Greenback	1879–1880	Montcalm County	Endorsed by the Democrats.
Erastus H. Stanton	Republican	1881–1882	Ionia	
John W. Hance	Republican	1883–1884	Mt. Pleasant	
Henry Woodruff	Republican	1885–1886	Farwell	
Floyd L. Post	Republican	1887–1888	Coleman	
Edbert B. Green	Republican	1889–1890	Alma	
Frank L. Prindle	Republican	1891–1892	Gladwin	
Peter Gilbert	Democratic	1893–1894	Sterling	
Mendel J. Bialy	Republican	1895–1896	Bay City	
Alexander Forsyth	Democratic	1897–1898	Standish	Elected on a Democratic, Populist and free silver ticket.
Perley C. Heald	Republican	1899–1900	Midland	
Frank L. Westover	Republican	1901–1904	Bay City	
Albert O. Heine	Republican	1905–1906	Bay City	
Frank L. Edinborough	Republican	1907–1908	Bay City	
William A. Collins	Republican	1909–1912	Bay City	
William H. Allswede	Progressive	1913–1914	Sanford	
Augustus H. Gansser	Republican	1915–1918	Bay City	
William J. Bierd	Republican	1919–1920	Auburn	
Ralph William Phillips	Republican	1921–1922	Bay City	
Augustus H. Gansser	Republican	1923–1932	Bay City	
Charles B. Asselin	Democratic	1933–1934	Bay City	
Gerald J. Cotter	Republican	1935–1936	Mt. Pleasant	
Joseph V. Coumans	Democratic	1937–1938	Bay City	
Jerry T. Logie	Republican	1939–1944	Bay City	Resigned amid criminal charges.
Frank Heath	Republican	1945–1954	Bay City	Died in office.
Lynn O. Francis	Republican	1955–1962	Midland	
Lester O. Begick	Republican	1963–1964	Bay City	
S. Don Potter	Republican	1965–1966	Lansing	
Harold W. Hungerford	Republican	1967–1970	Lansing	
Philip O. Pittenger	Republican	1971–1974	Lansing	
Earl E. Nelson	Democratic	1975–1978	Lansing	
William A. Sederburg	Republican	1979–1990	East Lansing	
Debbie Stabenow	Democratic	1991–1994	Lansing	
Joe Schwarz	Republican	1995–2002	Battle Creek	
Patricia L. Birkholz	Republican	2003–2010	Saugatuck Township	
Rick Jones	Republican	2011–2018	Grand Ledge	
Tom Barrett	Republican	2019–2022	Charlotte	Lived in Potterville until around 2021.
Ruth Johnson	Republican	2023–present	Groveland Township	

== Recent election results ==
=== 2020s ===
2026 Michigan Senate election
Primary election
Party	Candidate	Votes	%
General election
Republican	Douglas Chester Wozniak	80,324	60.32
Democratic	Edlira Sako	52,850	39.68
Total votes		133,174	100
Republican hold			

2022 Michigan Senate election, District 24
Party	Candidate	Votes	%
Republican	Ruth Johnson	87,171	65.8
Democratic	Theresa J. Fougnie	45,316	34.2
Total votes		132,487	100
Republican hold			

=== 2018 ===
2018 Michigan Senate election, District 24
Primary election
Party	Candidate	Votes	%
Republican	Tom Barrett	22,127	70.4
Republican	Brett Roberts	9,289	29.6
Total votes		31,416	100
General election
Republican	Tom Barrett	66,969	53.5
Democratic	Kelly Rossman-McKinney	54,352	43.4
Libertarian	Katie Nepton	2,064	1.6
Constitution	Matthew Shepard	1,711	1.4
Total votes		125,096	100
Republican hold			

=== 2014 ===
2014 Michigan Senate election, District 24
Party	Candidate	Votes	%
Republican	Rick Jones (incumbent)	55,332	56.4
Democratic	Dawn Levey	42,776	43.6
Total votes		98,108	100
Republican hold			

=== Federal and statewide results ===
Year	Office	Results
2020	President	Trump 53.4 – 44.7%
2018	Senate	James 49.8 – 48.2%
2018	Governor	Whitmer 50.2 – 46.7%
2016	President	Trump 52.4 – 41.3%
2014	Senate	Peters 52.5 – 43.7%
2014	Governor	Snyder 51.5 – 46.5%
2012	President	Romney 49.6 – 49.4%
2012	Senate	Stabenow 55.2 – 41.5%

== Historical district boundaries ==
Map	Description	Apportionment Plan	Notes
	Ingham County (part); Alaiedon Township; Aurelius Township; Bunker Hill Township; Delhi Township; East Lansing; Ingham Township; Lansing (part); Lansing Township; Leroy Township; Leslie Township; Mason; Meridian Township; Onondaga Township; Stockbridge Township; Vevay Township; Wheatfield Township; White Oak Township	1964 Apportionment Plan	
	Ingham County (part); Alaiedon Township (part); Delhi Township; East Lansing; Lansing; Lansing Township; Locke Township; Meridian Township; Williamston; Williamstown Township	1972 Apportionment Plan	
	Ingham County (part); Alaiedon Township; Aurelius Township; Bunker Hill Township; East Lansing; Ingham Township; Lansing; Lansing Township; Leroy Township; Leslie; Leslie Township; Locke Township; Mason; Meridian Township; Onondaga Township; Stockbridge Township; Vevay Township; Wheatfield Township; White Oak Township; Williamston; Williamstown Township	1982 Apportionment Plan	
	Calhoun County; Eaton County; Ingham County (part); Delhi Charter Township	1992 Apportionment Plan	
	Allegan County; Barry County; Eaton County	2001 Apportionment Plan	
	Clinton County; Eaton County; Ingham County (part); Leroy Township; Locke Township; Wheatfield Township; Williamston; Williamstown Township; Shiawassee County	2011 Apportionment Plan	
