= Little Thornapple River (Eaton County) =

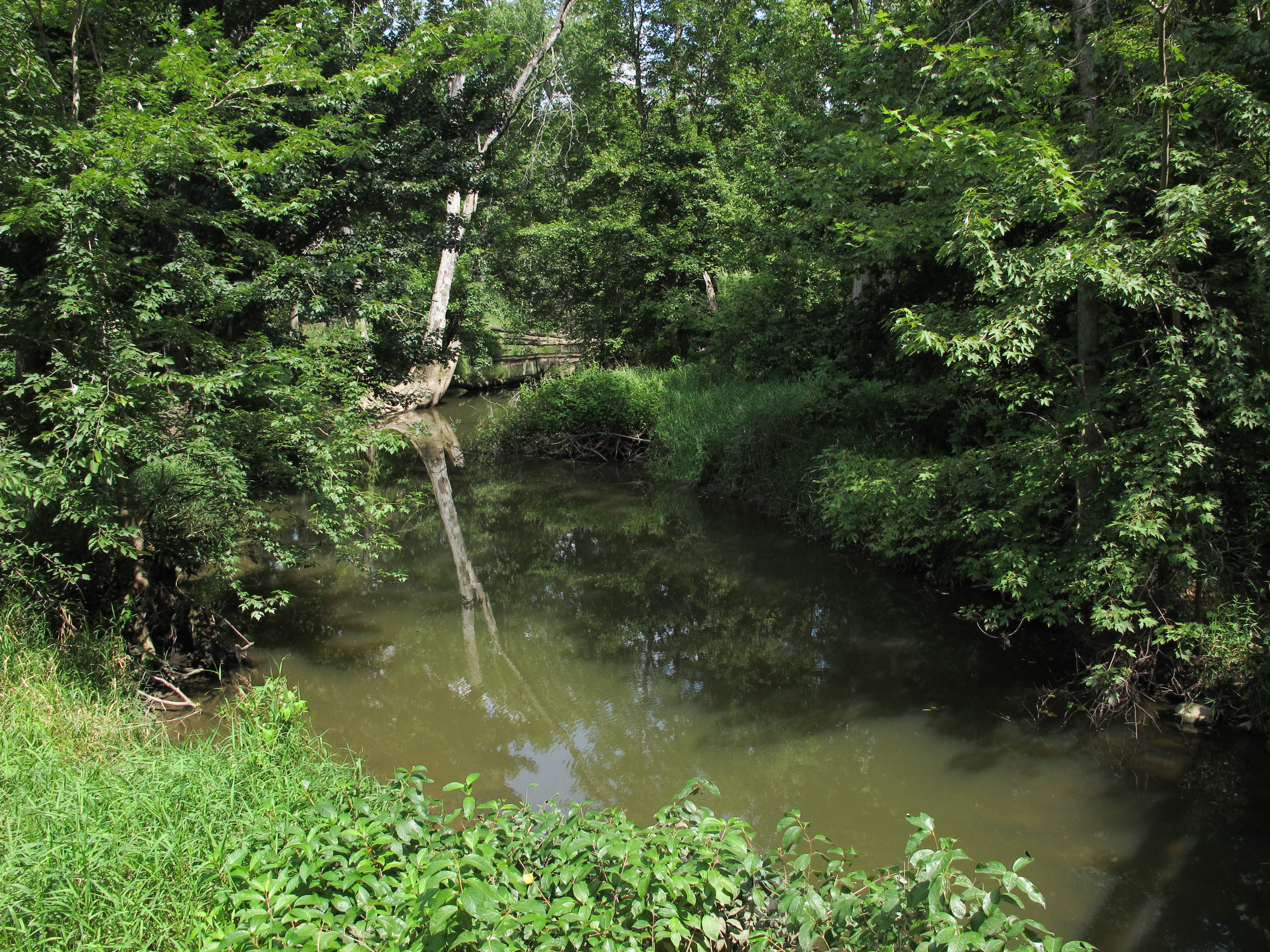
- The Little Thornapple River in Chester Township

Location
- Country: United States

Physical characteristics
- Source
  - location: Carmel Township, Eaton County, Michigan
- Mouth
  - location: Thornapple River
  - elevation: 840 ft (260 m)
- Discharge
  - location: mouth
  - average: 29.14 cu ft/s (0.825 m^{3}/s) (estimate)

Basin features
- River system: Grand River

Little Thornapple River is a 9.1-mile-long (14.6 km) river in Eaton County in the U.S. state of Michigan.

The Little Thornapple rises in central Carmel Township at 42°33′23″N 84°54′27″W, approximately 4.5 miles (7.2 km) from downtown Charlotte.

There are few named tributaries. Just north of the Wend Valley Airport, the Little Thornapple is joined by the Densmore Perkins Fish Creek Drain and the Baker Drain.

The stream flows primarily to the north and empties into the Thornapple River in Chester Township at 42°39′27″N 84°52′27″W.
