= Bela W. Jenks =

Bela W. Jenks may refer to:

- Bela W. Jenks (born 1824) (1824–1897), Michigan politician
- Bela W. Jenks (born 1849) (1849–1930), Michigan politician
