= Albion football, 1890–1899 =

American college football seasons

The Albion football teams (later known as the Albion Britons) represented Albion College in American football during the program's second decade of college football from 1890 to 1899. The team competed as a member of the Michigan Intercollegiate Athletic Association (MIAA) during the 1890s. Highlights include the following:

- In 1891, Albion defeated the Michigan Wolverines by a 10–4 score. Albion had played seven prior games with the Wolverines, each prior game ending in a loss by a combined score of 287 to 22.
- In 1891, Albion also compiled a perfect 4–0 record and won the MIAA championship.
- In 1894, Albion played two games with Notre Dame. The first game ended in a scoreless tie. In the second game, played on November 29, 1894, Albion won.
- The 1894 team compiled a 5–1–1 record (3–0 in MIAA games) and won the MIAA championship.

== 1890 ==
1890 Albion football

MIAA champion
- Conference: Michigan Intercollegiate Athletic Association
- Record: 4–0 (3–0 MIAA)
- Head coach: Captains

The 1890 Albion football team represented Albion College as a member of the Michigan Intercollegiate Athletic Association (MIAA) during the 1890 college football season. The team compiled a perfect 4–0 record (3–0 in MIAA games).

=== Schedule ===
Date	Opponent	Site	Result	Attendance	Source
October 11	Michigan	Fair Grounds; Ann Arbor, MI	L 10–56	350	
October 25	Michigan	Albion, MI	L 0–16		
November 8	vs. Michigan Athletic Association	Detroit, MI	W 68–0		
November 15	Olivet	Olivet, MI	L 32–12		

== 1891 ==
1891 Albion football

MIAA champion
- Conference: Michigan Intercollegiate Athletic Association
- Record: 4–0 (3–0 MIAA)
- Head coach: Captains

The 1891 Albion football team represented Albion College as a member of the Michigan Intercollegiate Athletic Association (MIAA) during the 1891 college football season. The team compiled a perfect 4–0 record (3–0 in MIAA games).

=== Schedule ===
Date	Opponent	Site	Result	Attendance	Source
October 17	Michigan*	Ann Arbor Fairgrounds; Ann Arbor, MI	W 10–4		
	Olivet		W 11–0		
October 31	vs. Olivet	Trotting Association grounds; Battle Creek, MI	W 24–6	3,000–5,000	
November 7	Hillsdale		W 34–4		
*Non-conference game

=== Game summaries ===
==== Michigan ====
Albion at Michigan

Team	1	2	Total
• Albion	10	0	10
Michigan	0	4	4

- Date: October 17
- Location: Ann Arbor Fairgrounds

On October 17, 1891, Albion defeated the Michigan Wolverines for the first time by a 10–4 score. The game was played at the Ann Arbor Fairgrounds in 30-minute halves. Albion had played Michigan seven times from 1886 to 1890 and had lost all seven of the previous matches by a combined score of 287 to 22.

Albion scored first, using a formation that Michigan argued was illegal. The Albion linemen, excepting the ends, locked arms and formed a wedge of protection for the quarterback who ran behind the wedge. The ends, halfbacks, and fullback locked in behind the quarterback, protecting the ball carrier from all sides. Because Albion's line was heavier, Michigan's line had difficulty in stopping Albion's advance. Michigan argued that the use of interlocking arms violated new rules prohibiting the use of arms to interfere with or obstruct an opponent who was not carrying the ball. Michigan also argued that the quarterback run was illegal as a violation of a rule prohibiting the first man to receive the ball when snapped from advancing the ball. Burnham (quarterback and captain) and Anderson (left halfback) scored touchdowns for Albion in the first half, and Burnham kicked a goal from touchdown. Hayes scored a touchdown for Michigan in the second half.

The Albion team arrived at its local train station at midnight following the game. They were met at the depot by a large crowd, including almost every male student at the college, armed with kazoos, razoos, bells, drums, and fish-horns. The team was taken by carriage to a bonfire on College Hill, where Burnham provided a first-hand account of the game.

== 1892 ==
1892 Albion football
- Conference: Michigan Intercollegiate Athletic Association
- Record: 3–1 (1–0 MIAA)
- Head coach: Captains

The 1892 Albion football team represented Albion College as a member of the Michigan Intercollegiate Athletic Association (MIAA) during the 1892 college football season. The team compiled a 3–1 record (1–0 in MIAA games).

=== Schedule ===
Date	Time	Opponent	Site	Result	Attendance	Source
October 8		at Hillsdale	Hillsdale, MI	W 38–6		
October 15	3:00 p.m.	at Detroit Athletic Club*	D. A. C. grounds; Detroit, MI	W 18–10		
October 29		Michigan Military Academy*	Albion, MI	W 40–0		
November 5		at Michigan*	Regents Field; Ann Arbor, MI	L 8–60	600	
*Non-conference game

=== Game summaries ===
==== Michigan ====
Albion at Michigan

Team	1	2	Total
Albion	4	4	8
• Michigan	30	30	60

- Date: November 5
- Location: Regents Field, Ann Arbor, MI
- Game attendance: 600

On November 5, 1892, Albion lost to the Michigan Wolverines by a score of 60–8. The game was played in halves of 45 minutes in front of 600 spectators at Regents Field in Ann Arbor. Michigan scored 10 touchdowns and converted on all 10 kicks for goal from touchdown. The Detroit Free Press reported: "The university team played a sprinting game, nearly every touchdown being made after long runs and skillful dodging." George Jewett, Michigan's first African-American player, was credited with playing a "great game", having kicked nine consecutive goals after touchdown. Dygert kicked the 10th goal. The score was evenly divided between the two halves, with Michigan scoring 30 points and Albion four points in each half.

The game was marked by rough play. Michigan's left guard Jefferis received a "vicious kick" in the back, the sound of which could be heard in the grandstand. Jefferis left the game and was replaced by Hall. Michigan's right end Hayes accused Albion's fullback Mulholland of putting fingers in his mouth and trying "to tear him." An Albion player also accused Michigan's left tackle Bray of slugging him in the face.

== 1893 ==
1893 Albion football
- Conference: Michigan Intercollegiate Athletic Association
- Record: 1–4 (1–2 MIAA)
- Head coach: Atwood (1st season)

The 1893 Albion football team represented Albion College as a member of the Michigan Intercollegiate Athletic Association (MIAA) during the 1893 college football season.

=== Schedule ===
Date	Time	Opponent	Site	Result	Attendance	Source
October 16		Hillsdale	Albion, MI	L 0–18		
October 28		at Detroit Athletic Club*	Detroit, MI	L 8–20	1,000	
November 4		at Olivet	Olivet, MI	W 42–16		
November 11		at Notre Dame*	Brownson Hall field; Notre Dame, IN	L 6–8		
November 18	3:30 p.m.	at Hillsdale	Hillsdale, MI	L 0–18		
*Non-conference game

== 1894 ==
1894 Albion football

MIAA champion
- Conference: Michigan Intercollegiate Athletic Association
- Record: 5–1–1 (3–0 MIAA)
- Head coach: Walter B. Gage (1st season)
- Captain: Wilbur Cogshell

1894 Michigan Intercollegiate Athletic Association football standings
	Conf.					Overall
Team	W		L		T	W		L		T
Albion $	3	–	0	–	0	5	–	1	–	1
Hillsdale	1	–	2	–	0	3	–	3	–	0
Olivet	1	–	2	–	0	1	–	3	–	0
Michigan State Normal	0	–	1	–	0	5	–	2	–	0
$ – Conference champion

The 1894 Albion football team represented Albion College in the Michigan Intercollegiate Athletic Association (MIAA) during the 1894 college football season. Under first-year head coach Walter B. Gage, Albion won the MIAA championship, with victories over Hillsdale and Olivet and a victory over Notre Dame in their Thanksgiving Day game.

=== Schedule ===
Date	Opponent	Site	Result	Attendance	Source
October 13	at Michigan*	Regents Field; Ann Arbor, MI	L 10–26		
October 15–19	Battle Creek High School*		W 72–0		
October 20	at Notre Dame*	Brownson Hall field; Notre Dame, IN	T 6–6		
October 27	at Michigan Military Academy*	Jackson, MI	W 18–0	600–1,000	
October 29	Hillsdale	Fair grounds; Albion, MI	W 18–0		
November 5	Olivet	Albion, MI	W 18–0		
November 19?	at Hillsdale	Hillsdale, MI	W 36–10		
November 29	at Notre Dame*	Brownson Hall field; Notre Dame, IN	W 19–12 (or 22–12)	200+	
*Non-conference game

The contest against Battle Creek High School was considered a practice game, and so is not reflected on the final record.

=== Second team schedule ===
Albion's second team was organized in early October. They were managed by W. F. Kendrick and captained by Frank Mulholland.

Date	Opponent	Site	Result	Source
November	Michigan Agricultural College	East Lansing, MI	W	
November 11	Michigan reserves	Albion, MI	W 6–0	

== 1895 ==
1895 Albion football
- Conference: Michigan Intercollegiate Athletic Association
- Record: 2–2 (0–1 MIAA)

The 1895 Albion football team represented Albion College as a member of the Michigan Intercollegiate Athletic Association (MIAA) during the 1895 college football season. In its second and final season under head coach Walter B. Gage, the team compiled a 2–2 record (0–1 in conference) and outscored opponents by a total of 42 to 40.

=== Schedule ===
Date	Time	Opponent	Site	Result	Source
October 19	2:00 p.m.	Lansing Athletic Club*	Albion College campus; Albion, MI	W 26–0	
October 26		at Lansing Athletic Club*	Parshall Park; Lansing, MI	W 2–0	
November 2	3:30 p.m.	at Detroit Athletic Club*	D. A. C. grounds; Detroit, MI	L 12–18	
November 16		at Olivet	Olivet, MI	L 2–22	
*Non-conference game

== 1896 ==
1896 Albion football
- Conference: Michigan Intercollegiate Athletic Association
- Record: 4–4 (2–1 MIAA)
- Head coach: F. J. Shipp (1st season)
- Captain: Harrow (right end)

The 1896 Albion football team represented Albion College as a member of the Michigan Intercollegiate Athletic Association (MIAA) during the 1896 college football season. Led by former F. J. Shipp in his first and only season as head coach, Albion compiled a of 4–4 record (2–1 in conference games) and was outscored by a total of 124 to 42. Shipp had starred as a halfback for Albion during the previous five seasons.

=== Schedule ===
Date	Time	Opponent	Site	Result	Attendance	Source
October		Detroit Athletic Club*		W 17–6		
October		Jackson High School*		W 24–0		
October 17	4:00 p.m.	at Detroit Athletic Club*	Detroit, MI	L 0–22		
October 24		Hillsdale	Albion, MI	W 20–0		
October 31		at Notre Dame*	Brownson Hall field; Notre Dame, IN	L 0–24		
November 7		Michigan State Normal	Ypsilanti, MI	L 0–52		
November 14		Kalamazoo	Albion, MI	W 6–4		
November 26		Detroit Athletic Club*	Detroit, MI	L 0–16	1,000	
*Non-conference game

== 1897 ==
1897 Albion football
- Conference: Michigan Intercollegiate Athletic Association
- Record: 3–4–1 (2–4–1 MIAA)
- Head coach: William A. Niles (1st season)

The 1897 Albion football team represented Albion College as a member of the Michigan Intercollegiate Athletic Association (MIAA) during the 1897 college football season. In their first and only year under head coach William A. Niles, the team compiled a 3–4–1 record (2–4–1 in MIAA games).

=== Schedule ===
Date	Opponent	Site	Result	Attendance	Source
	Jackson High School		W 10–7		
October 9	at Olivet	Olivet, MI	L 16–28		
October 23	at Hillsdale	Hillsdale, MI	T 0–0		
October 16	at Kalamazoo	Recreation Park; Kalamazoo, MI	L 0–58	200	
	Hillsdale		W 5–2		
October 30	Michigan State Normal	Albion, MI	L 6–18		
November 13	Kalamazoo	Albion, MI	L 10–26		
	Olivet		W 36–0		

== 1898 ==
1898 Albion football
- Conference: Michigan Intercollegiate Athletic Association
- Record: 1–5 (0–4 MIAA)
- Head coach: Carl Jacobs (1st season)
- Captains: H. O. Widrig; Carl Jacobs (fullback)

1898 Michigan Intercollegiate Athletic Association football standings
	Conf.					Overall
Team	W		L		T	W		L		T
Kalamazoo $	5	–	0	–	0	7	–	0	–	0
Hillsdale	2	–	0	–	0	4	–	1	–	0
Michigan Agricultural	4	–	1	–	0	4	–	3	–	0
Michigan State Normal	0	–	3	–	0	1	–	5	–	2
Olivet	0	–	3	–	0	0	–	5	–	0
Albion	0	–	4	–	0	1	–	6	–	0
$ – Conference champion

The 1898 Albion football team represented Albion College as a member of the Michigan Intercollegiate Athletic Association (MIAA) during the 1898 college football season. In its first year under head coach Carl Jacobs, the team compiled a 1–5 record (0–4 in MIAA games).

=== Schedule ===
Date	Opponent	Site	Result	Source
October 22	Michigan Agricultural	East Lansing, MI	L 6–62	
	Hillsdale		L 2–34	
November 5	Kalamazoo	Albion, MI	L 0–11	
November 12	Kalamazoo	Kalamazoo, MI	L 0–25	
November 19	Notre Dame*	Albion, MI	L 0–60	
	Jackson Athletic Club*		W 15–0	
*Non-conference game

=== Reserves schedule ===
Date	Opponent	Site	Result	Source
October 22	Jackson High School	Jackson, MI	L 0–18	

== 1899 ==
1899 Albion football
- Conference: Michigan Intercollegiate Athletic Association
- Record: 2–6 (1–5 MIAA)
- Head coach: Chester Brewer (1st season)

The 1899 Albion football team represented Albion College as a member of the Michigan Intercollegiate Athletic Association (MIAA) during the 1899 college football season. Led by first-year head coach Chester Brewer, Albion compiled a 2–6 record (1–5 in conference games) and was outscored by a total of 99 to 76.

=== Schedule ===
Date	Time	Opponent	Site	Result	Attendance	Source
September 30		Marshall High School*	Albion, MI	W 34–6		
October 7		at Michigan	Regents Field; Ann Arbor, MI	L 0–26		
October 14		at Olivet	Olivet, MI	L 11–23		
November 11		Olivet	Albion, MI	W 10–0		
November 18		Kalamazoo	Albion, MI	L 0–11		
November 24		at Hillsdale	Martin Field; Hillsdale, MI	L 5–11		
November 30	2:30 p.m.	at Kalamazoo	Kalamazoo College campus; Kalamazoo, MI	L 11–16	4,000–5,000	
		Hillsdale		L 5–6		
*Non-conference game
