= Tom Barrett (Michigan politician) =

American politician (born 1981)

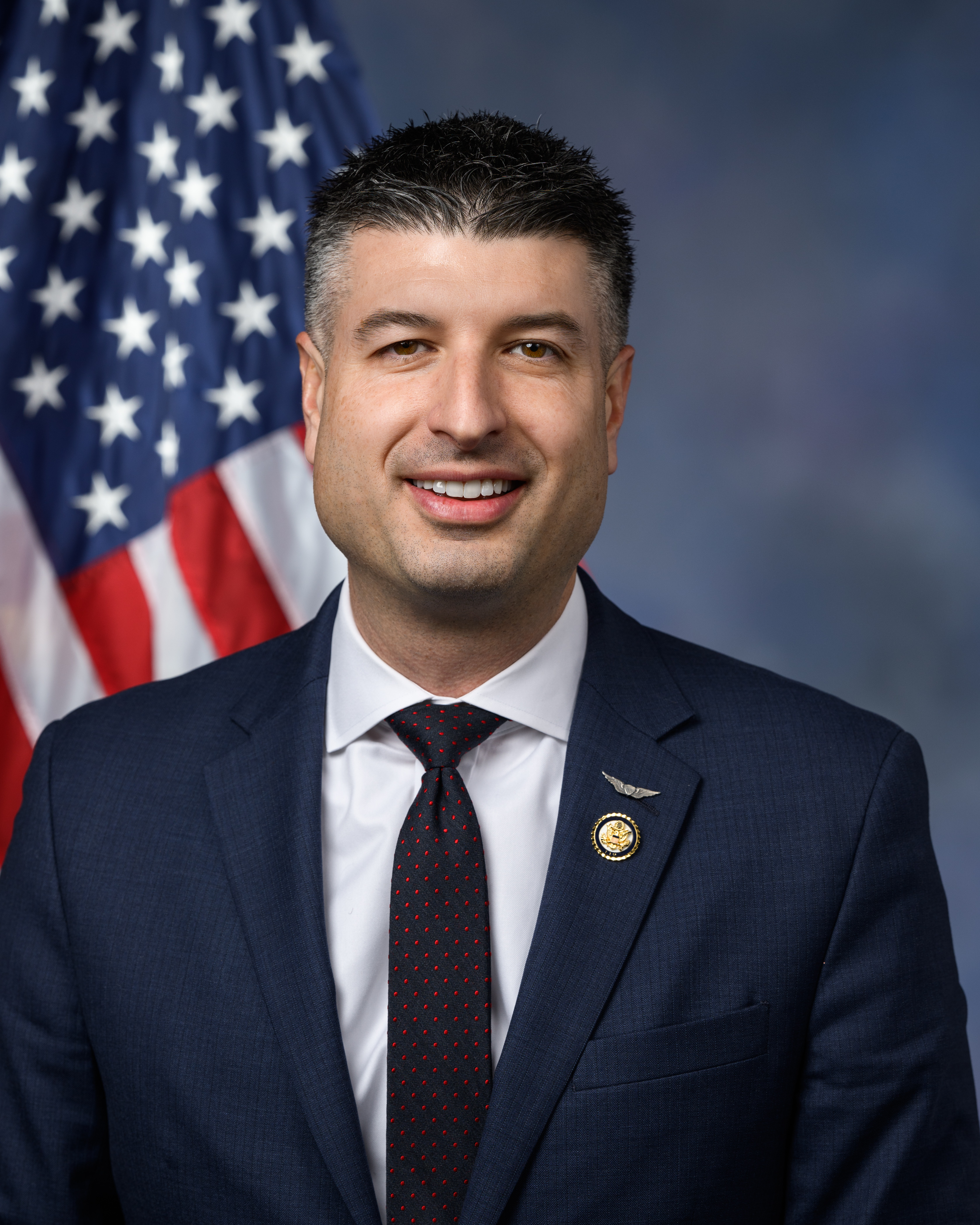
- Official portrait, 2025

Member of the U.S. House of Representatives from Michigan's 7th district
- In office January 3, 2025 – January 3, 2027
- Preceded by: Elissa Slotkin
- Succeeded by: William Lawrence

Member of the Michigan Senate from the 24th district
- In office January 1, 2019 – January 1, 2023
- Preceded by: Rick Jones
- Succeeded by: Ruth Johnson

Member of the Michigan House of Representatives from the 71st district
- In office January 1, 2015 – January 1, 2019
- Preceded by: Theresa Abed
- Succeeded by: Angela Witwer

Personal details
- Born: Thomas More Barrett; April 30, 1981 (age 45) Southfield, Michigan, U.S.
- Party: Republican
- Spouse: Ashley Barrett
- Children: 4
- Relatives: Louis C. Rabaut (great-grandfather)
- Education: Western Michigan University (BA)
- Website: House website Campaign website

Military service
- Branch: United States Army
- Service years: 2001–2022
- Rank: Chief Warrant Officer 2
- Unit: Michigan Army National Guard
- Battles/wars: Operation Iraqi Freedom; Operation Enduring Freedom

Thomas More Barrett (born April 30, 1981) is an American politician, financial analyst, and former U.S. Army officer serving as the U.S. representative for Michigan's 7th congressional district since 2025. A Republican, he previously served in the Michigan Senate from 2019 to 2023 and in the Michigan House of Representatives from 2015 to 2019. His congressional district covers a seven-county area that includes Lansing.

Barrett was the Republican nominee for the district in the 2022 election, which he lost to Democratic incumbent Elissa Slotkin. He ran for the same seat again in 2024, defeating Democratic nominee Curtis Hertel Jr. He ran for re-election in 2026, but lost to Democrat William Lawrence.

== Early life and education ==
Barrett was born in Southfield, Michigan, on April 30, 1981. He graduated from Western Michigan University with a Bachelor of Arts degree in political science.

== U.S. Army and early career ==
After graduating from high school, Barrett joined the Army, where he served for 21 years. He served abroad in South Korea, Guantanamo Bay, Kuwait, and Iraq, and is a veteran of both Operation Enduring Freedom and Operation Iraqi Freedom. He served in the Michigan Army National Guard, holding the rank of Chief Warrant Officer 2, until retiring in 2022.

Prior to running for public office, Barrett worked as an analyst for the Michigan Department of the Treasury.

== Michigan Legislature ==
=== Michigan House of Representatives (2014–2019) ===
Barrett was elected to the Michigan House of Representatives in 2014, narrowly beating Democratic incumbent Theresa Abed. He won re-election in 2016, defeating Theresa Abed in a rematch. Barrett garnered 54% of the vote to Abed's 43% and Libertarian Marc Lord's 3%.

=== Michigan Senate (2019–2023) ===
Barrett was elected to the Michigan Senate in 2018, and in 2022 chaired the Transportation and Infrastructure Committee.

Barrett was a vocal critic of Michigan Governor Gretchen Whitmer's handling of the COVID-19 pandemic, and sponsored Senate Bill 858 to regulate the governor's state of emergency powers, which the governor vetoed in May 2020.

Barrett was one of eleven state senators to sign a letter to Congress requesting, in January 2021, an "objective and transparent investigation into credible allegations of misconduct" in the 2020 presidential election. In September 2022, Barrett said that the legitimacy of the 2020 election is "unknowable".

== U.S. House of Representatives ==
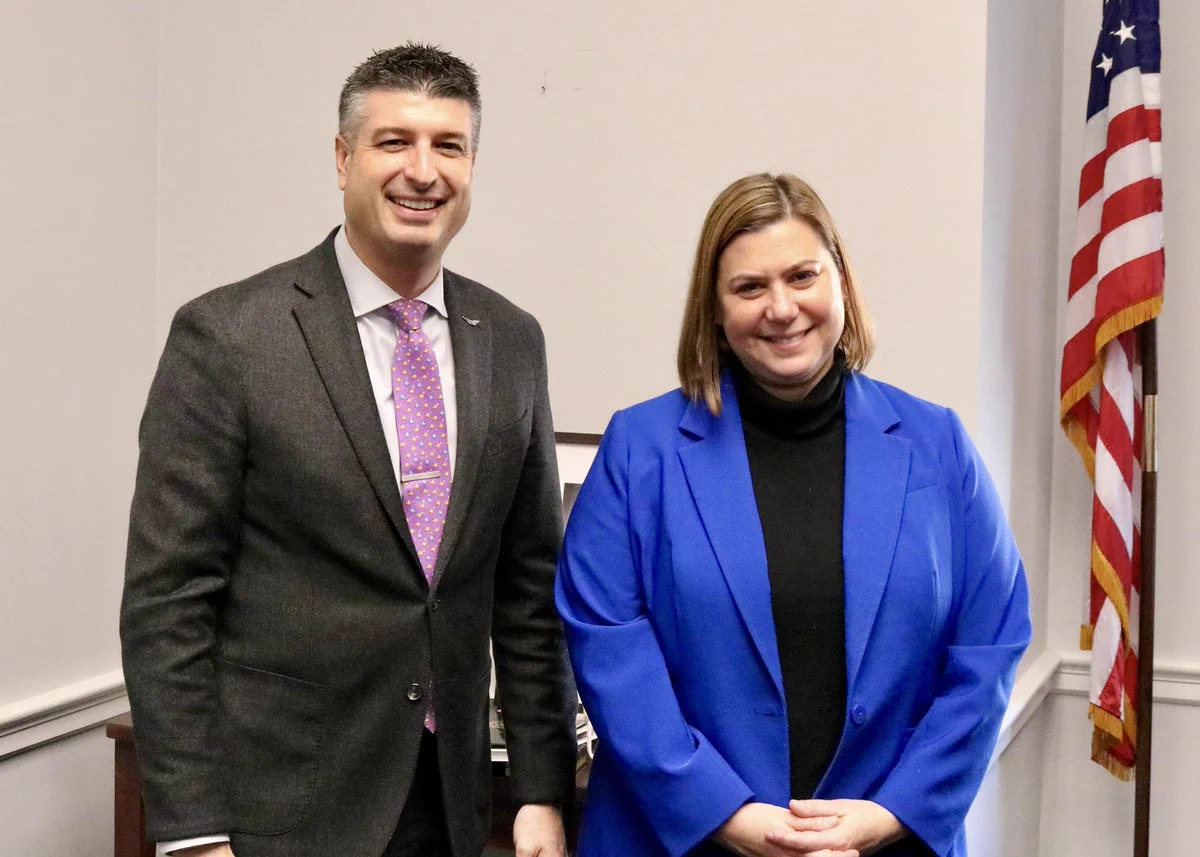
Barrett with his predecessor, Elissa Slotkin, in 2024.

=== Elections ===
==== 2022 ====
In November 2021, Barrett announced his candidacy for the U.S. House of Representatives in the 2022 election for Michigan's 7th congressional district. He won the Republican primary in August 2022, but lost to Democratic incumbent Elissa Slotkin in the November general election, receiving 46% of the vote to her 52%.

Bridge Michigan reported that, as of October 12, 2022, this was the most costly congressional election in the U.S. By November 4, over $36 million had been spent by both campaigns.

==== 2024 ====
Barrett ran again for election in 2024 for the same district after Slotkin gave it up to succeed Debbie Stabenow in the Senate. Stabenow had represented this district, then numbered as the 8th, from 1996 to 2001.

During the campaign, Black Michigan lawmakers called for a probe into a Barrett ad in a Black-owned newspaper that listed election day as November 6, alleging it was meant to mislead Black voters, as the actual date was November 5. His campaign denied the charge, calling it a one-time proofing error.

He defeated Democratic nominee Curtis Hertel Jr. in the general election.

=== 2026 ===
Barrett sought reelection in 2026 and was defeated by climate activist William Lawrence. While Barrett carried four of the district's seven counties, he could not overcome a 48,700-vote deficit in Ingham County, home to Lansing. This was far more than the overall margin of 13,100 votes.

=== Tenure ===
Barrett was sworn into the 119th U.S. Congress on January 3, 2025.

In May 2025, Barrett voted for the One Big Beautiful Bill Act, helping the budget and tax bill pass in a 215 to 214 vote in the House of Representatives.

In January 2026, Barrett voted not to extend the Affordable Care Act enhanced tax credits.

In March 2026, Barrett said he supported the Trump administration's strikes on Iran. On June 3, 2026, Barrett was one of four House Republicans to vote in favor of H. Con. Res. 75, a War Powers Resolution directing the removal of U.S. forces from Iran.

=== Committee assignments ===
- Committee on Transportation and Infrastructure
  - Subcommittee on Economic Development, Public Buildings and Emergency Management
  - Subcommittee on Highways and Transit
- Committee on Veterans' Affairs
  - Subcommittee on Economic Opportunity
  - Subcommittee on Technology Modernization (Chair)

=== Caucus memberships ===
- Republican Study Committee

== Personal life ==
Barrett lives in Charlotte, Michigan, with his wife, Ashley, and their four children. His great-grandfather, Louis C. Rabaut, represented Michigan's 14th congressional district as a Democrat from 1935 to 1947 and from 1949 to 1961. During the congressional office lottery for the 119th Congress, Barrett asked his colleagues to consider leaving Longworth 1232 vacant, which they did, so he could claim the same office held by Rabaut in 1954.

Barrett is a Catholic.

U.S. House of Representatives
Preceded by Elissa Slotkin	Member of the U.S. House of Representatives from Michigan's 7th congressional district 2025–present	Incumbent
U.S. order of precedence (ceremonial)
Preceded by Yassamin Ansari	United States representatives by seniority 365th	Succeeded by Michael Baumgartner
