= Antrim Township, Michigan =

- Civil township
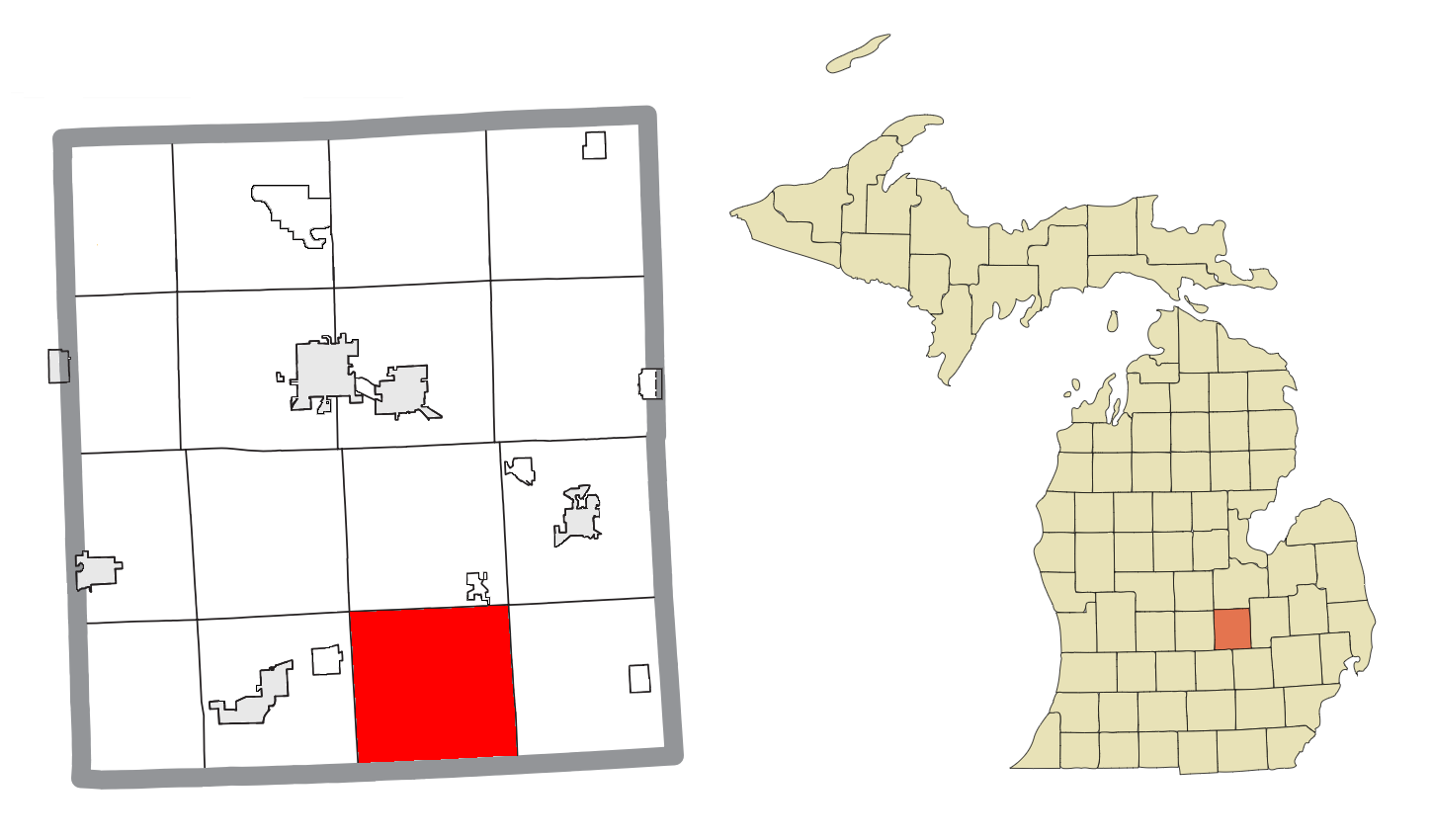
- Location within Shiawassee County

- Location within the state of Michigan Antrim Township (the United States)
- Coordinates: 42°49′50″N 84°05′44″W
- Country: United States
- State: Michigan
- County: Shiawassee
- Organized: 1838

Government
  - Supervisor: Jerry Gutting
  - Clerk: Susan McGahey

Area
  - Total: 36.64 sq mi (94.9 km^{2})
  - Land: 35.53 sq mi (92.0 km^{2})
  - Water: 1.11 sq mi (2.9 km^{2})
- Elevation: 869 ft (265 m)

Population (2020)
  - Total: 2,116
  - Density: 59.56/sq mi (22.99/km^{2})
- Time zone: UTC-5 (Eastern (EST))
  - Summer (DST): UTC-4 (EDT)
- ZIP code(s): 48414 (Bancroft); 48418 (Byron); 48857 (Morrice); 48872 (Perry)
- Area code: 989
- FIPS code: 26-03120
- GNIS feature ID: 1625840

Antrim Township is a civil township of Shiawassee County in the U.S. state of Michigan. As of the 2020 census, the township population was 2,116. The township is believed to be named after either Antrim, Northern Ireland or Antrim, New Hampshire.

Antrim Township was organized in 1838.

== Communities ==
- Antrim Center is an unincorporated community in the township at Godfrey and E. Ellsworth roads. 42°48′49″N 84°06′52″W Originally, the post office here was called Antrim, then later changed to Glass River. The post office closed on September 13, 1888.
- Nicholson is an unincorporated community in the township on E. Lovejoy Road (border road with Livingston County) between State and Nohel roads. 42°46′37″N 84°07′26″W Nicholson contained a post office from 1896 until 1901. Joseph C. Nicholson, the postmaster, gave the community its name.

== Geography ==
According to the United States Census Bureau, the township has a total area of 36.64 square miles (94.90 km^{2}), of which 35.53 square miles (92.02 km^{2}) is land and 1.11 square miles (2.87 km^{2}) (3.03%) is water.

== Demographics ==
As of the census of 2000, there were 2,050 people, 691 households, and 570 families residing in the township. The population density was 56.1 inhabitants per square mile (21.7/km^{2}). There were 734 housing units at an average density of 20.1 per square mile (7.8/km^{2}). The racial makeup of the township was 97.56% White, 0.10% African American, 0.10% Native American, 0.24% Asian, 0.05% Pacific Islander, 0.49% from other races, and 1.46% from two or more races. Hispanic or Latino of any race were 1.71% of the population.

There were 691 households, out of which 35.6% had children under the age of 18 living with them, 72.2% were married couples living together, 4.9% had a female householder with no husband present, and 17.4% were non-families. 13.2% of all households were made up of individuals, and 5.9% had someone living alone who was 65 years of age or older. The average household size was 2.95 and the average family size was 3.18.

In the township the population was spread out, with 27.4% under the age of 18, 8.1% from 18 to 24, 29.7% from 25 to 44, 24.6% from 45 to 64, and 10.1% who were 65 years of age or older. The median age was 37 years. For every 100 females, there were 106.0 males. For every 100 females age 18 and over, there were 101.6 males.

The median income for a household in the township was $53,092, and the median income for a family was $59,438. Males had a median income of $45,052 versus $28,571 for females. The per capita income for the township was $20,806. About 3.1% of families and 4.6% of the population were below the poverty line, including 2.2% of those under age 18 and 8.6% of those age 65 or over.

== Highways ==
- I-69

== Notable people ==
- Brian BeGole, Michigan state legislator
