= Patricia L. Birkholz =

American politician (1944–2018)

Member of the Michigan Senate from the 24th district
- In office January 1, 2003 – December 31, 2010
- Preceded by: Joe Schwarz
- Succeeded by: Rick Jones

Member of the Michigan House of Representatives from the 88th district
- In office January 1, 1997 – December 31, 2002
- Preceded by: Paul Hillegonds
- Succeeded by: Fulton Sheen

Personal details
- Born: January 28, 1944 Allegan, Michigan
- Died: May 3, 2018 (aged 74)
- Party: Republican
- Education: Western Michigan University

Patricia L. Birkholz (January 28, 1944 - May 3, 2018) was a director of the Michigan Office of the Great Lakes. Previously, she served as a member of the Michigan State Senate from 2002 to 2010. In the Senate, she represented the 24th district comprising Allegan, Barry and Eaton Counties. Prior to her terms in the Senate, she represented the 88th District in the Michigan House of Representatives from 1996 to 2002. She was the Allegan County Treasurer from 1992 to 1996. Birkholz began her career in politics as a trustee for Saugatuck Township.

Birkholz has a degree from Western Michigan University.

Birholz died of cancer on May 3, 2018, aged 74.
