= Angela Witwer =

American politician

Member of the Michigan House of Representatives
- Incumbent
- Assumed office January 1, 2019
- Preceded by: Tom Barrett
- Constituency: 71st district (2019–2022); 76th district (2023–present)

Personal details
- Born: Buckley, Michigan, U.S.
- Party: Democratic
- Spouse: Bruce
- Children: 2
- Education: Northwood University (BS)
- Website: Campaign website

Angela Kaye Witwer is an American politician and a Democratic member of the Michigan House of Representatives, serving the 76th House District.

== Early life and education ==
Witwer was born in Buckley, Michigan, a village near Traverse City. She grew up on a farm with her parents, George and Marilyn, and her three sisters.

Witwer is an alumna of Waverly Community Schools. She received her bachelor's degree in business and marketing from Northwood University.

== Early career ==
Before being elected to the state legislature, Witwer spent 22 years working in clinical health care, including Sparrow Hospital's burn unit and as a manager in pediatric rehabilitation. Later, she became the manager of Sparrow Hospital's community relations and marketing department.

Witwer also co-founded Edge Partnership, a public relations, marketing, and advocacy group. She has also served as the vice president of Waverly Community Schools Board of Education, and has spent time as a member of the Lansing Regional Chamber of Commerce Economic Club committee, McLaren Greater Lansing Foundation Board of Directors, and the Wharton Center for Performing Arts Advisory Council.

== State legislature ==
Witwer was first elected to the Michigan House of Representatives on November 6, 2018. She won by fewer than 800 votes against opponent Christine Barnes.

Witwer was re-elected to the Michigan House of Representatives in 2020 for House District 71, defeating opponent Gina Johnsen.

Witwer won her election in 2022 with over 55% of the vote. This time she was elected to House District 76, defeating Republican opponent Jeremy Whittum. The district change was due to the state's recent redistricting. She was reelected in 2024.

In March 2025, Witwer broke party lines to vote in favor of a resolution urging enforcement of the federal ban on transgender girls in women’s sports (HR 0040), but later in August voted against House Bill 4066, which would have codified such restrictions into Michigan law.

== Personal life ==
Witwer resides in Delta Township, where she has been a resident for almost 50 years. She lives with her husband, Bruce, and has two children and four granddaughters.

Michigan House of Representatives
Preceded by Tom Barrett	Member of the Michigan House of Representatives from the 71st district 2019–2022	Succeeded by Brian BeGole
Preceded by Rachel Hood	Member of the Michigan House of Representatives from the 76th district 2023–present	Incumbent
