= Theresa Abed =

American politician

Member of the Michigan House of Representatives from the 71st district
- In office January 1, 2013 – December 31, 2014
- Preceded by: Deb Shaughnessy
- Succeeded by: Tom Barrett

Personal details
- Born: Detroit, Michigan, U.S.
- Party: Democratic
- Spouse: David
- Education: Wayne State University
- Occupation: Politician
- Website: www.theresabed.com

Theresa Abed is an American politician from Michigan. Abed was a Democratic member of the Michigan House of Representatives, serving during the 2013–2014 session.

== Education ==
Abed earned a bachelor's degree and a master's degree in social work from Wayne State University.

== Career ==
Abed has a background as a social worker. In 2006, Abed served as a commissioner of Eaton County, Michigan, until 2010.

On November 6, 2012, Abed won the election and became a Democratic member of Michigan House of Representatives for District 71. Abed defeated Deb Shaughnessy with 53.43% of the votes.

Abed lost her bid for re-election in 2014 to Republican Tom Barrett. In 2016 Abed unsuccessfully ran against Barrett for the 71st seat again.
