= Vermontville Township, Michigan =

- Township
- Location within the state of Michigan
- Coordinates: 42°37′56″N 85°0′43″W
- Country: United States
- State: Michigan
- County: Eaton
- Founded: March 11, 1837

Area
  - Total: 36.4 sq mi (94.2 km^{2})
  - Land: 36.3 sq mi (94.1 km^{2})
  - Water: 0.077 sq mi (0.2 km^{2})
- Elevation: 938 ft (286 m)

Population (2020)
  - Total: 1,947
  - Density: 53.6/sq mi (20.7/km^{2})
- Time zone: Eastern
- ZIP code: 49096
- Area code: 517
- FIPS code: 26-81980
- GNIS feature ID: 1627194
- Website: https://vermontvilletownshipmi.gov/

Vermontville Township is a civil township of Eaton County in the U.S. state of Michigan. The population was 1,947 at the 2020 census.

== Communities ==
- The Village of Vermontville is located within the township. It hosts the original maple syrup festival in Michigan, held the last full weekend in April.

== History ==
Vermontville Township was organized (along with Eaton Township) in March 1837 out of Bellevue Township. It originally included the entire northwest quarter of Eaton County (present day townships of Vermontville, Chester, Sunfield, and Roxand.)

The Fire Department was established in 1836 as a cooperative effort between the Village of Vermontville and Vermontville Township. It is now operated by Vermontville Township.

The township is served by the Vermontville Township Public Library, which began on February 12, 1949. It is located on the first floor of the Vermontville Opera House. The Vermontville Opera House was begun in the 1890s and completed in 1898. It was a joint project between the Village and the Township, and continues under joint ownership at present.

== Geography ==
According to the US Census Bureau, the township has a total area of 36.4 square miles (94 km^{2}), of which 36.3 square miles (94 km^{2}) is land and 0.1 square miles (0.26 km^{2}) (0.22%) is water.

== Demographics ==
As of the 2000 United States census, there were 2,100 people, 749 households, and 588 families in the township. The population density was 57.8 inhabitants per square mile (22.3/km^{2}). There were 807 housing units at an average density of 22.2 per square mile (8.6/km^{2}). The racial makeup of the township was 97.29% White, 0.05% African American, 0.29% Native American, 0.43% Asian, 0.38% from other races, and 1.57% from two or more races. Hispanic or Latino of any race were 1.29% of the population.

There were 749 households, out of which 38.1% had children under the age of 18 living with them, 63.8% were married couples living together, 9.6% had a female householder with no husband present, and 21.4% were non-families. 17.5% of all households were made up of individuals, and 8.4% had someone living alone who was 65 years of age or older. The average household size was 2.80 and the average family size was 3.15.

The township population contained 30.3% under the age of 18, 6.5% from 18 to 24, 27.7% from 25 to 44, 25.4% from 45 to 64, and 10.1% who were 65 years of age or older. The median age was 36 years. For every 100 females, there were 98.9 males. For every 100 females age 18 and over, there were 95.5 males.

The median income for a household in the township was $45,848, and the median income for a family was $51,167. Males had a median income of $38,971 versus $25,972 for females. The per capita income for the township was $17,998. About 5.1% of families and 7.0% of the population were below the poverty line, including 8.2% of those under age 18 and 10.6% of those age 65 or over.
