= Deb Shaughnessy =

American politician (born 1960)

Member of the Michigan House of Representatives from the 71st district
- In office January 1, 2011 – December 31, 2012
- Preceded by: Rick Jones
- Succeeded by: Theresa Abed

Mayor of Charlotte
- In office 2005–2009

Personal details
- Born: December 19, 1960 (age 65) Lansing, Michigan
- Party: Republican
- Spouse: Steve
- Education: Lansing Community College

Deb Shaughnessy (born December 19, 1960) is a former Republican member of the Michigan House of Representatives and mayor of Charlotte.

An alumna of Lansing Community College, Shaughnessy worked for the Michigan Department of Treasury and several legislators, including House Speaker Paul Hillegonds and Senate Majority Leader Dick Posthumus. She was elected to the Charlotte city council in 2001, and served as mayor from 2005 through 2009. She had also been a newspaper writer.

After defeating her for election in 2010, Shaughnessy lost her bid for re-election to Theresa Abed in 2012.
