= Rick Jones (politician) =

American politician (born 1952)

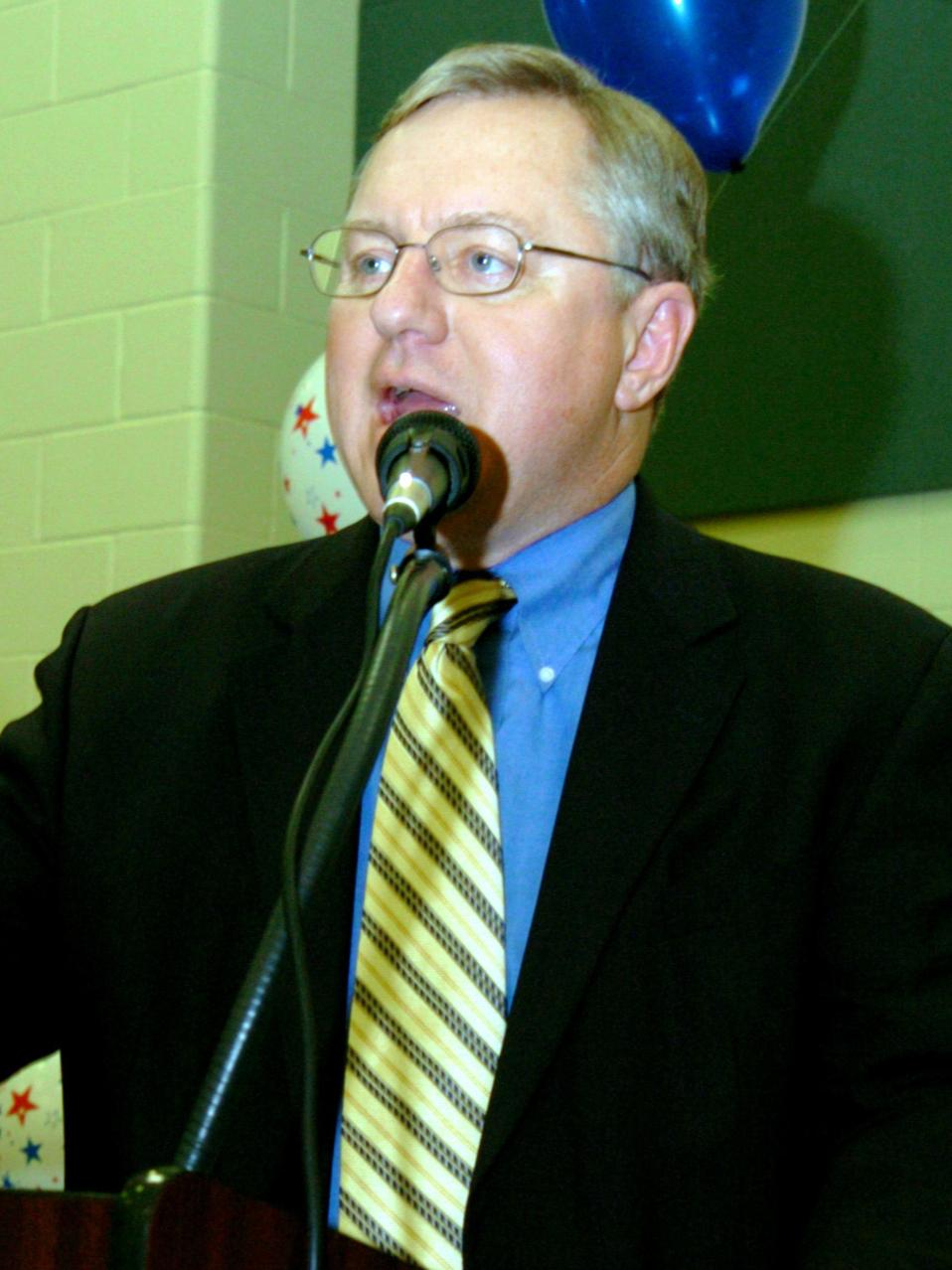

Member of the Michigan Senate from the 24th district
- In office January 1, 2011 – January 1, 2019
- Preceded by: Patricia L. Birkholz
- Succeeded by: Tom Barrett

Member of the Michigan House of Representatives from the 71st district
- In office January 1, 2005 – January 1, 2011
- Preceded by: Susan Tabor
- Succeeded by: Deb Shaughnessy

Personal details
- Born: November 17, 1952 (age 73) Battle Creek, Michigan, U.S.
- Party: Republican
- Spouse: Charlene
- Education: Michigan State University
- Website: State Sen. Rick Jones

Rick Jones (born November 17, 1952) is a Republican politician from Michigan who served in the Michigan Senate for two terms in the 24th district, after having served three terms in the Michigan House of Representatives.

Prior to his election to the legislature, Jones served one term as the Eaton County Sheriff and had spent 31 years with the sheriff's department.
