= Fran Bera =

American aviator

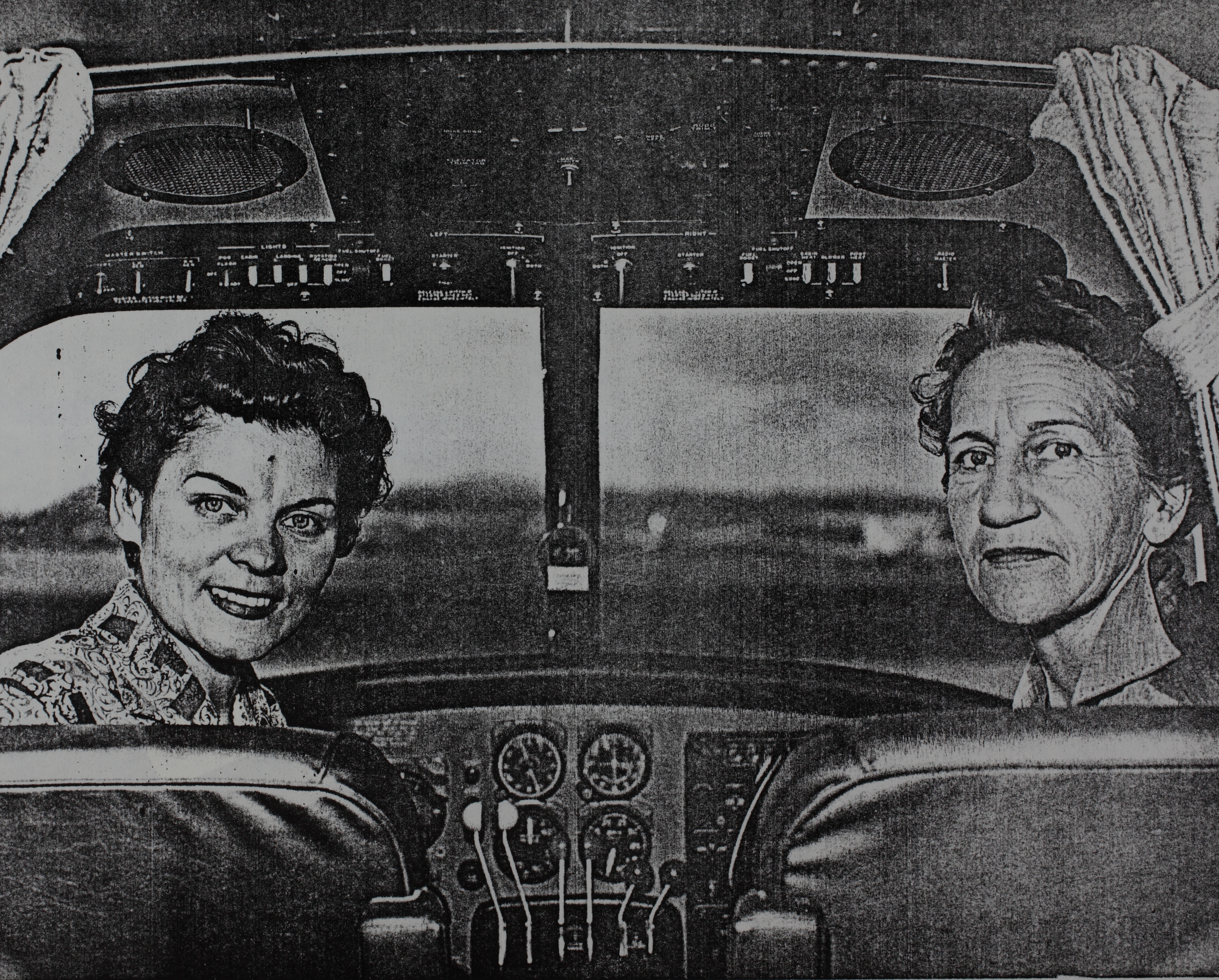
- Fran Bera (left)
- Born: Frances Sebastian; December 7, 1924; Mulliken, Michigan
- Died: February 10, 2018 (aged 93); San Diego, California
- Occupation: Aviator
- Years active: 1945-1985
- Known for: World altitude record for class C-l-d, established in June 1966 in Long Beach, California
- Awards: The Elder Statesmen Award for Aviation, Winner of the Palm to Pines All Women's Air Race in 1997, 1998, 2000, 2003, 2004, and 2005

Fran Bera (December 7, 1924 in Mulliken, Michigan – February 10, 2018), was an American female aviator and record setting pilot. She is the first woman to fly a helicopter without a tail rotor.

== Early life ==
Frances Sebastian was born, in 1924, to Hungarian immigrant farmers in Mulliken, Michigan, the youngest of eight children. She graduated from high school in Lake Odessa, Michigan, but was then rejected from the Women Airforce Service Pilots due to her height (4'9'').

She earned her pilot's license at age 16 and became a designated examiner to certify new pilots at age 24. She was the youngest, and one of the first women pilot examiners.

== Career ==
Bera was a test pilot and became the first saleswoman for Piper and Beech aircraft. Fran was a CFII for over 50 years and administered over 3,000 check ride exams for new pilots and advanced rated pilots. She primarily flew fixed wing and helicopters through much of her life. She stopped logging her flight hours after 25,000. A member of the Ninety Nines, she estimated she had spent the equivalent of three years in the pilot's seat. In 1993, she flew her Piper 235 Cherokee from California to Siberia "just for the fun of it". Bera flew her 1966 pink and white Piper Comanche, PA 24 – 260, with “Kick Ass” printed under the tail section, until she was 91 years old.

== Records and recognition ==
Bera held a number of aviation records and began winning air races shortly after she began competing in the 1950s. During her race career, she recorded seven wins in the All-Women's Transcontinental Air Races (commonly known as the Powder Puff Derby) in the 1950s as well as seven wins in the Palm to Pines All Women's Air Race.

On July 16, 1966, she set the record for the highest altitude in a normally aspirated aircraft (40,154+ feet in a Piper Aztec) in Long Beach, California. This record remains current as of May 2024.

=== Additional awards and honors ===
- 2005 - Livingston Award, presented by the Whirly-Girls for contributions to women in helicopter aviation
- 2006 - The Elder Statesman Award for Aviation, presented to her in Washington, D.C. by former Senator Bob Dole
- 2006 - Women In Aviation (WIA) award for outstanding female aviator
- 2006 - Inductee, Women in Aviation International Pioneer Hall of Fame
- 2006 - FAA Wright Brothers Master Pilot Award
- 2008 - Inducted into the International Air & Space Hall of Fame at the San Diego Air & Space Museum.
- 2011 - The Katharine Wright Award for over 50 years in aviation with no aviation accidents or incidents

== Bibliography ==
- Welch, Rosanne (1998). Encyclopedia of Women in Aviation and Space. ABC-CLIO. ISBN 978-0-87436-958-8.
