= Walter B. Gage =

American educator, football player and coach (1872–1949)

Biographical details
- Born: April 21, 1872; Nashua, New Hampshire, U.S.
- Died: January 15, 1949 (aged 76); St. Petersburg, Florida, U.S.
- Education: Harvard (1894)

Playing career
- 1891: Harvard

Coaching career (HC unless noted)
- 1894–1895: Albion

Administrative career (AD unless noted)
- c. 1899–1939: Hackley School (NY) (headmaster)

Head coaching record
- Overall: 7–3–1

Accomplishments and honors

Championships
- 1 MIAA (1894)

Walter Boutwell Gage (April 21, 1872 – January 15, 1949) was an American educator and college football player and coach. He was an 1894 graduate of Harvard University. During his collegiate days, he lettered for the Harvard Crimson football team in 1891. Gage served as the head football coach at Albion College in Michigan from 1894 to 1895, compiling a record of 8–2–1.

Gage graduated from Phillips Exeter Academy in Exeter, New Hampshire. He was the headmaster of the Hackley School in Tarrytown, New York for 40 years, until his retirement in 1939. Gage died on January 15, 1939, at his home in St. Petersburg, Florida.

== Head coaching record ==
Year	Team	Overall	Conference	Standing	Bowl/playoffs
Albion (Michigan Intercollegiate Athletic Association) (1894–1895)
1894	Albion	5–1–1	3–0	1st	
1895	Albion	2–2	0–1		
Albion:		7–3–1	3–1		
Total:		7–3–1			
National championship Conference title Conference division title or championship game berth
