= Wend Valley Airport =

Public use airport in Eaton County, Michigan

- IATA: none; ICAO: K49G; FAA LID: 49G

Summary
- Airport type: Public
- Operator: Roger Wend
- Location: Charlotte, Michigan
- Time zone: UTC−05:00 (-5)
  - Summer (DST): UTC−04:00 (-4)
- Elevation AMSL: 891 ft / 272 m
- Coordinates: 42°34′45.131″N 84°54′29.97″W
- Interactive map of Wend Valley Airport

Runways
Direction	Length		Surface
Direction	ft	m	Surface
18/36	1,800	549	Turf

Statistics (2014)
- Aircraft movements: 456
- Based aircraft: 5

Wend Valley Airport (FAA LID: 49G) is a privately owned, public-use general aviation airport located northwest of Charlotte in Eaton County, Michigan, United States.

== Facilities and aircraft ==
Wend Valley Airport has one runway. It is designated as runway 18/36 and measures 1800 x 100 ft (549 x 30 m), and it is made of turf. The airport is closed from December through March, and also when snow-covered. The airport is accessible by road from Valley Highway, and is located approximately 1 mile north of M-79.

There is no fuel at the airport.

For the 12-month period ending December 31, 2014, the airport had 456 aircraft operations, an average of 38 per month. It was composed entirely of general aviation. For the same time period, there were five aircraft based at the field, all single-engine airplanes.

== Accidents and incidents ==
- On August 9, 1996, an Aeronca 11AC crashed due to the pilot's improper use of engine controls (carburetor heat and/or throttle) while making a relatively high speed approach, low pass, and pull-up. The sequence resulted in partial loss of engine power, and the pilot's failure to maintain sufficient airspeed after the partial loss of power resulted in an inadvertent stall/spin.
- On April 11, 2007, a Cessna 210 Centurion was substantially damaged during a hard landing and subsequent runway excursion. At 1 foot above the runway, the aircraft encountered a gust and hit the runway hard. The aircraft porpoised, and though the pilot added power, the landing gear had sustained damage, causing the aircraft to veer off the runway. The probable cause of the accident was found to be the pilot's inadequate compensation for the wind conditions, inadequate landing flare, failure to maintain directional control, and encounter with a pilot-induced oscillation (the porpoise).

== See also ==
- List of airports in Michigan
