= Mulliken, Michigan =

- Village
- Location of Mulliken, Michigan
- Coordinates: 42°45′42″N 84°53′45″W
- Country: United States
- State: Michigan
- County: Eaton
- Incorporated (village): 1903

Area
  - Total: 1.04 sq mi (2.70 km^{2})
  - Land: 1.04 sq mi (2.70 km^{2})
  - Water: 0 sq mi (0.00 km^{2})
- Elevation: 863 ft (263 m)

Population (2020)
  - Total: 525
  - Density: 503.1/sq mi (194.24/km^{2})
- Time zone: UTC-5 (Eastern (EST))
  - Summer (DST): UTC-4 (EDT)
- ZIP code: 48861
- Area code: 517
- FIPS code: 26-56140
- GNIS feature ID: 0633112
- Website: https://villageofmulliken.org/

Mulliken is a village in Eaton County in the U.S. state of Michigan. The population was 525 at the 2020 census. The village is within Roxand Township. The Mulliken post office was established in 1888.

== Geography ==
According to the United States Census Bureau, the village has a total area of 1.04 square miles (2.69 km^{2}), all land.

== Demographics ==
Historical population
Census	Pop.	Note	%±
1910	312		—
1920	290		−7.1%
1930	309		6.6%
1940	338		9.4%
1950	411		21.6%
1960	484		17.8%
1970	454		−6.2%
1980	550		21.1%
1990	590		7.3%
2000	557		−5.6%
2010	553		−0.7%
2020	525		−5.1%
U.S. Decennial Census

=== 2010 census ===
As of the census of 2010, there were 553 people, 202 households, and 156 families living in the village. The population density was 531.7 inhabitants per square mile (205.3/km^{2}). There were 223 housing units at an average density of 214.4 per square mile (82.8/km^{2}). The racial makeup of the village was 96.6% White, 0.2% Native American, 0.9% from other races, and 2.4% from two or more races. Hispanic or Latino of any race were 3.1% of the population.

There were 202 households, of which 38.1% had children under the age of 18 living with them, 57.9% were married couples living together, 12.4% had a female householder with no husband present, 6.9% had a male householder with no wife present, and 22.8% were non-families. 16.8% of all households were made up of individuals, and 5% had someone living alone who was 65 years of age or older. The average household size was 2.71 and the average family size was 2.97.

The median age in the village was 35.3 years. 24.8% of residents were under the age of 18; 8.8% were between the ages of 18 and 24; 29.6% were from 25 to 44; 28.4% were from 45 to 64; and 8.5% were 65 years of age or older. The gender makeup of the village was 52.4% male and 47.6% female.

=== 2000 census ===
As of the census of 2000, there were 557 people, 195 households, and 151 families living in the village. The population density was 534.2 inhabitants per square mile (206.3/km^{2}). There were 201 housing units at an average density of 192.8 per square mile (74.4/km^{2}). The racial makeup of the village was 96.23% White, 0.72% African American, 0.54% Native American, 0.18% Asian, 0.90% from other races, and 1.44% from two or more races. Hispanic or Latino of any race were 2.15% of the population.

There were 195 households, out of which 41.0% had children under the age of 18 living with them, 64.1% were married couples living together, 10.3% had a female householder with no husband present, and 22.1% were non-families. 15.4% of all households were made up of individuals, and 5.6% had someone living alone who was 65 years of age or older. The average household size was 2.83 and the average family size was 3.13.

In the village, the population was spread out, with 26.8% under the age of 18, 9.3% from 18 to 24, 33.2% from 25 to 44, 21.7% from 45 to 64, and 9.0% who were 65 years of age or older. The median age was 35 years. For every 100 females, there were 107.1 males. For every 100 females age 18 and over, there were 101.0 males.

The median income for a household in the village was $50,391, and the median income for a family was $52,375. Males had a median income of $41,094 versus $27,500 for females. The per capita income for the village was $18,181. About 1.4% of families and 3.6% of the population were below the poverty line, including 4.5% of those under age 18 and 7.3% of those age 65 or over.

== Notable residents ==
- Fran Bera, pioneering woman aviator
