= Brian BeGole =

American politician

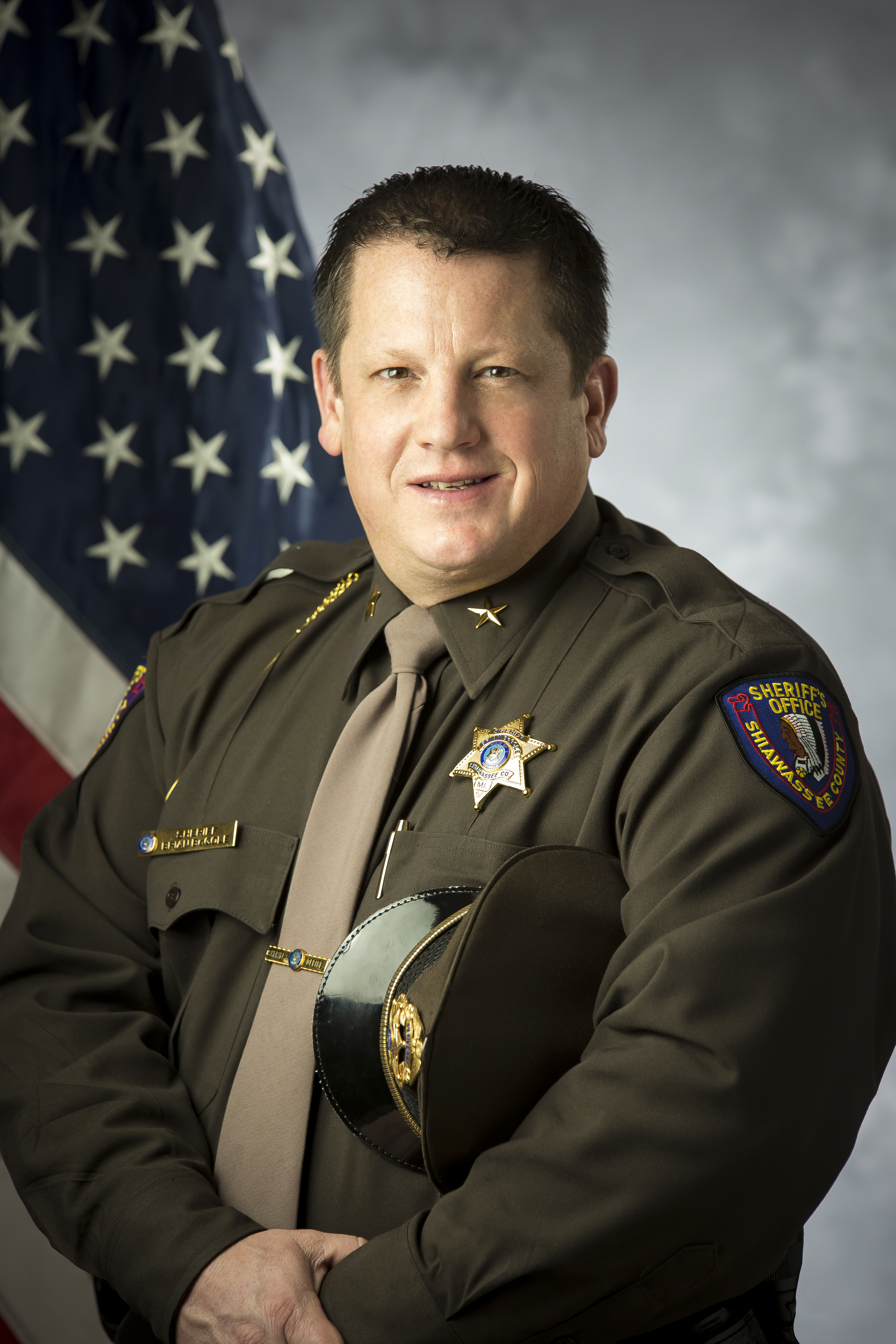

Member of the Michigan House of Representatives from the 71st district
- Incumbent
- Assumed office January 1, 2023
- Preceded by: Angela Witwer (redistricting)

Personal details
- Party: Republican

Brian BeGole is an American politician from Michigan who has represented the 71st district in the Michigan House of Representatives since the 2022 election. He was reelected in 2024.

Before his election BeGole was sheriff of Shiawassee County.

== See also ==
- Official website
- Campaign website
