= Locke Township, Michigan =

- Civil township
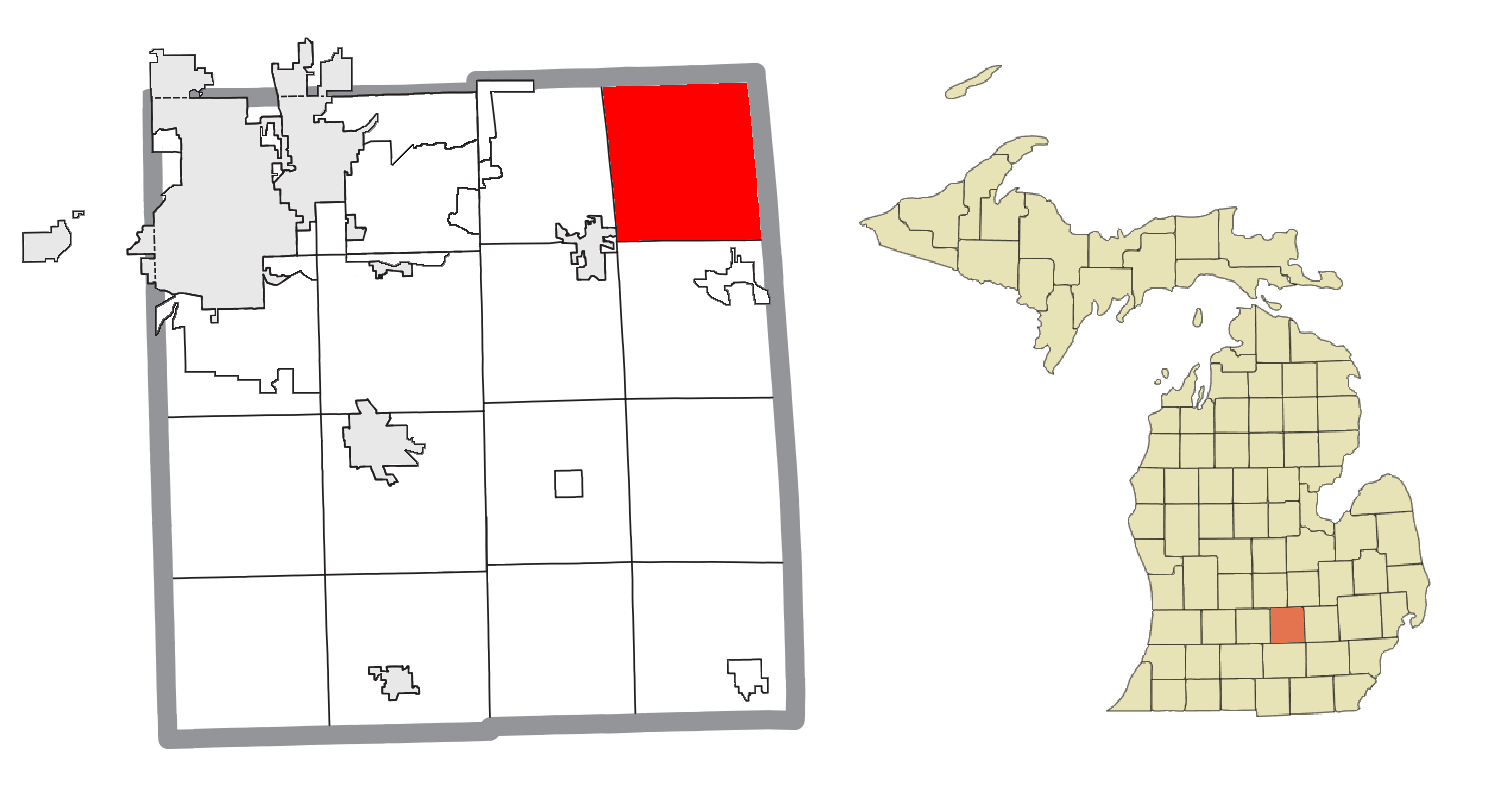
- Location within Ingham County

- Location within the state of Michigan Location within the United States
- Coordinates: 42°44′01″N 84°12′12″W
- Country: United States
- State: Michigan
- County: Ingham
- Established: 1838

Government
  - Supervisor: Dorothy Hart
  - Clerk: Glenda Turner

Area
  - Total: 36.06 sq mi (93.39 km^{2})
  - Land: 35.84 sq mi (92.83 km^{2})
  - Water: 0.22 sq mi (0.57 km^{2})
- Elevation: 899 ft (274 m)

Population (2020)
  - Total: 1,809
  - Density: 50.47/sq mi (19.49/km^{2})
- Time zone: UTC-5 (Eastern (EST))
  - Summer (DST): UTC-4 (EDT)
- ZIP code(s): 48872 (Perry); 48892 (Webberville); 48895 (Williamston)
- Area code: 517
- FIPS code: 26-49040
- GNIS feature ID: 1626634
- Website: Official website

Locke Township is a civil township of Ingham County in the U.S. state of Michigan. The population was 1,809 at the 2020 census.

== Geography ==
According to the United States Census Bureau, the township has a total area of 36.06 square miles (93.39 km^{2}), of which 35.84 square miles (92.83 km^{2}) is land and 0.22 square miles (0.57 km^{2}) (0.61%) is water.

== Demographics ==
As of the census of 2000, there were 1,671 people, 571 households, and 480 families residing in the township. The population density was 46.4 inhabitants per square mile (17.9/km^{2}). There were 588 housing units at an average density of 16.3 per square mile (6.3/km^{2}). The racial makeup of the township was 97.55% White, 0.12% African American, 0.72% Native American, 0.60% Asian, 0.06% from other races, and 0.96% from two or more races. Hispanic or Latino of any race were 1.08% of the population.

There were 571 households, out of which 39.2% had children under the age of 18 living with them, 73.7% were married couples living together, 5.1% had a female householder with no husband present, and 15.8% were non-families. 11.9% of all households were made up of individuals, and 4.9% had someone living alone who was 65 years of age or older. The average household size was 2.93 and the average family size was 3.18.

In the township, the population was spread out, with 28.2% under the age of 18, 6.7% from 18 to 24, 30.6% from 25 to 44, 26.2% from 45 to 64, and 8.3% who were 65 years of age or older. The median age was 36 years. For every 100 females, there were 97.3 males. For every 100 females age 18 and over, there were 101.9 males.

The median income for a household in the township was $58,188, and the median income for a family was $62,422. Males had a median income of $42,500 versus $33,875 for females. The per capita income for the township was $23,149. About 1.8% of families and 4.1% of the population were below the poverty line, including 4.6% of those under age 18 and 4.3% of those age 65 or over.
