= Bela W. Jenks (born 1824) =

American politician

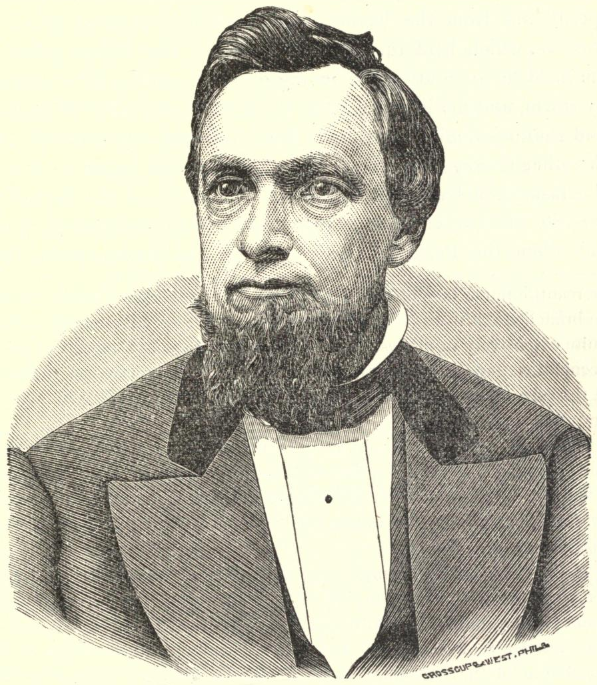

Member of the Michigan Senate from the 24th district
- In office January 1, 1869 – 1872
- Preceded by: William Sanborn
- Succeeded by: Harrison H. Wheeler

Personal details
- Born: June 6, 1824 Crown Point, New York, US
- Died: October 29, 1897 (aged 73) St. Clair, Michigan, US
- Party: Republican
- Spouse: Sarah Carleton

Bela Whipple Jenks (June 6, 1824 – October 29, 1897) was a Michigan politician.

== Early life ==
Jenks was born on June 6, 1824, in Crown Point, New York.

== Career ==
Jenks was a farmer. On November 3, 1868, Jenks was elected to the Michigan Senate where he represented the 24th district from January 6, 1869, to 1872. In 1881, Jenks was appointed by Governor David Jerome to the Michigan Board of Education where he served until 1888.

== Personal life ==
Jenks married Sarah Carleton on November 3, 1853.

== Death ==
Jenks died due to diabetes on October 29, 1897, in St. Clair, Michigan. Jenks was interred at Hillside Cemetery in St. Clair, Michigan.
