= Chester Township, Eaton County, Michigan =

Chester Township, Michigan
- Township
- Location within the state of Michigan
- Coordinates: 42°38′39″N 84°54′3″W
- Country: United States
- State: Michigan
- County: Eaton
- Established: 1839

Government
  - Type: Township Board
  - Supervisor: Justin Vedder
  - Clerk: Donyaellie Wheaton
  - Treasurer: Leslie Garn
  - Trustee: Randy Carlson
  - Trustee: Kim Walters

Area
  - Total: 36.1 sq mi (93.6 km^{2})
  - Land: 36.1 sq mi (93.6 km^{2})
  - Water: 0 sq mi (0.0 km^{2})
- Elevation: 912 ft (278 m)

Population (2020)
  - Total: 1,769
  - Density: 48.9/sq mi (18.9/km^{2})
- Time zone: Eastern
- FIPS code: 26-15260
- GNIS feature ID: 1626071

Chester Township is a civil township of Eaton County in the U.S. state of Michigan. The population was 1,769 at the 2020 United States census.

== History ==
Chester Township was organized in 1839.

== Communities ==
- Chester is an unincorporated community in the southern part of the township at 42°36′21″N 84°54′53″W.
- Gresham is an unincorporated community near the center of the township at 42°38′27″N 84°53′42″W, southwest of M-50 (Clinton Trail) near the intersection of Gresham Hwy. and Mulliken Rd. It was established in 1883.
- Needmore is an unincorporated community in the northeast corner of the township, along the boundary with Roxand Township at 42°41′00″N 84°51′22″W near the intersection of Needmore Hwy and Wheaton Rd.
- Stalls Corner is a small community 5 miles (8 km) NW of Charlotte.

== Geography ==
According to the US Census Bureau, the township has a total area of 36.1 square miles (93 km^{2}), of which 36.1 square miles (93 km^{2}) is land and 0.03% is water. Nearly all of the township is in the drainage basin of the Thornapple River, which flows through the northern part. The Little Thornapple River joins the Thornapple in section 11.

== Demographics ==
As of the 2000 United States census, there were 1,778 people, 648 households, and 517 families residing in the township. The population density was 49.2 inhabitants per square mile (19.0/km^{2}). There were 670 housing units at an average density of 18.5 per square mile (7.2/km^{2}). The racial makeup of the township was 97.64% White, 0.39% African American, 0.17% Native American, 0.39% Asian, 0.79% from other races, and 0.62% from two or more races. Hispanic or Latino of any race were 1.69% of the population.

There were 648 households, out of which 34.0% had children under the age of 18 living with them, 71.6% were married couples living together, 4.5% had a female householder with no husband present, and 20.2% were non-families. 17.3% of all households were made up of individuals, and 8.5% had someone living alone who was 65 years of age or older. The average household size was 2.74 and the average family size was 3.09.

The township population contained 26.5% under the age of 18, 7.0% from 18 to 24, 26.9% from 25 to 44, 27.6% from 45 to 64, and 11.9% who were 65 years of age or older. The median age was 39 years. For every 100 females, there were 102.3 males. For every 100 females age 18 and over, there were 98.2 males.

The median income for a household in the township was $52,438, and the median income for a family was $57,188. Males had a median income of $40,119 versus $27,875 for females. The per capita income for the township was $21,588. About 3.4% of families and 5.3% of the population were below the poverty line, including 7.6% of those under age 18 and 8.7% of those age 65 or over.
