= Brookfield Township, Eaton County, Michigan =

Brookfield Township, Michigan
- Township
- Location within the state of Michigan Brookfield Township, Michigan (the United States)
- Coordinates: 42°27′42″N 84°46′05″W
- Country: United States
- State: Michigan
- County: Eaton
- Organized: 1841

Area
  - Total: 36.2 sq mi (93.8 km^{2})
  - Land: 35.9 sq mi (93.0 km^{2})
  - Water: 0.31 sq mi (0.8 km^{2})
- Elevation: 935 ft (285 m)

Population (2020)
  - Total: 1,467
  - Density: 40.9/sq mi (15.8/km^{2})
- Time zone: UTC-5 (Eastern (EST))
  - Summer (DST): UTC-4 (EDT)
- ZIP codes: 48813 (Charlotte), 48827 (Eaton Rapids), 49076 (Olivet),49284 (Springport)
- FIPS code: 26-10920
- GNIS feature ID: 1625987
- Website: https://www.brookfieldtownship.com/

Brookfield Township is a civil township of Eaton County in the U.S. state of Michigan. As of the 2020 census, the township population was 1,467.

== Communities ==
There are no incorporated municipalities in the township.

- Brookfield is an unincorporated community in the township at 42°27′04″N 84°47′48″W The first settlers were Peter Moe with his sons Ezra and Henry, who arrived in 1837. The settlement was initially known as Moetown. When Brookfield Township was organized in 1841, the village was renamed for it. A post office operated from July 13, 1858, until December 13, 1865, and again from July 8, 1867, until July 30, 1904.
- Five Points Corner is a named populated place south of the city of Charlotte at 42°30′33″N 84°50′08″W. The community is at the junction of four townships, Walton to the southwest, Brookfield to the southeast, Eaton to the northeast, and Carmel to the northwest.
- The city of Charlotte is to the north-northwest, and the Charlotte ZIP code 48813 serves northern and western parts of Brookfield Township.
- The city of Eaton Rapids is to the east-northeast, and the Eaton Rapids ZIP code 48827 serves the eastern portion of Brookfield Township.
- The city of Olivet is to the west, and the Olivet ZIP code 49076 serves a small area in western Brookfield Township.
- The village of Springport is to the southeast in Jackson County, and the Springport ZIP code 49284 serves portions of southern Brookfield Township.

== Geography ==
According to the United States Census Bureau, the township has a total area of 36.2 square miles (94 km^{2}), of which 35.9 square miles (93 km^{2}) is land and 0.3 square miles (0.78 km^{2}) (0.86%) is water.

== Demographics ==
As of the census of 2000, there were 1,429 people, 538 households, and 399 families residing in the township. The population density was 39.8 inhabitants per square mile (15.4/km^{2}). There were 577 housing units at an average density of 16.1 units per square mile (6.2 units/km^{2}). The racial makeup of the township was 98.11% White, 0.28% Native American, 0.07% Asian, 0.49% from other races, and 1.05% from two or more races. Hispanic or Latino of any race were 2.38% of the population.

There were 538 households, out of which 32.9% had children under the age of 18 living with them, 65.6% were married couples living together, 4.8% had a female householder with no husband present, and 25.8% were non-families. 20.4% of all households were made up of individuals, and 7.2% had someone living alone who was 65 years of age or older. The average household size was 2.66 and the average family size was 3.09.

In the township the population was spread out, with 26.4% under the age of 18, 7.1% from 18 to 24, 29.7% from 25 to 44, 24.8% from 45 to 64, and 12.0% who were 65 years of age or older. The median age was 39 years. For every 100 females, there were 99.0 males. For every 100 females age 18 and over, there were 98.9 males.

The median income for a household in the township was $47,604, and the median income for a family was $53,875. Males had a median income of $39,444 versus $26,250 for females. The per capita income for the township was $19,720. About 3.2% of families and 6.1% of the population were below the poverty line, including 7.3% of those under age 18 and 3.6% of those age 65 or over.
