= Eaton Township, Michigan =

- Township
- Location within the state of Michigan
- Coordinates: 42°33′1″N 84°39′15″W
- Country: United States
- State: Michigan
- County: Eaton

Area
  - Total: 34.3 sq mi (88.9 km^{2})
  - Land: 34.1 sq mi (88.3 km^{2})
  - Water: 0.19 sq mi (0.5 km^{2})
- Elevation: 873 ft (266 m)

Population (2020)
  - Total: 4,007
  - Density: 118/sq mi (45.4/km^{2})
- Time zone: Eastern
- ZIP Code: 48827
- Area code: 517
- FIPS code: 26-24560
- GNIS feature ID: 1626212
- Website: https://eatontownship.com/

Eaton Township is a civil township of Eaton County in the U.S. state of Michigan. The population was 4,007 at the 2020 United States census.

== Communities ==
- Five Points Corner is a named populated place south of the city of Charlotte at 42°30′33″N 84°50′08″W. The community is at the junction of four townships, Walton to the southwest, Brookfield to the southeast, Eaton to the northeast, and Carmel to the northwest.
- Packard is a former community which has been largely absorbed into the northeast portion of Charlotte.

== Geography ==
According to the United States Census Bureau, the township has a total area of 32.6 square miles (84 km^{2}), of which 32.6 square miles (84 km^{2}) is land and 0.04 square miles (0.10 km^{2}) (0.06%) is water.

== Demographics ==
As of the 2000 United States census, there were 4,278 people, 1,531 households, and 1,249 families in the township. The population density was 131.3 inhabitants per square mile (50.7/km^{2}). There were 1,586 housing units at an average density of 48.7 per square mile (18.8/km^{2}). The racial makeup of the township was 96.31% White, 0.23% African American, 0.37% Native American, 0.89% Asian, 0.07% Pacific Islander, 1.03% from other races, and 1.10% from two or more races. Hispanic or Latino of any race were 2.57% of the population.

There were 1,531 households, out of which 38.5% had children under the age of 18 living with them, 69.4% were married couples living together, 7.8% had a female householder with no husband present, and 18.4% were non-families. 15.6% of all households were made up of individuals, and 6.5% had someone living alone who was 65 years of age or older. The average household size was 2.76 and the average family size was 3.04.

In the township the population was spread out, with 27.2% under the age of 18, 6.5% from 18 to 24, 29.2% from 25 to 44, 27.3% from 45 to 64, and 9.8% who were 65 years of age or older. The median age was 38 years. For every 100 females, there were 98.0 males. For every 100 females age 18 and over, there were 95.4 males.

The median income for a household in the township was $55,518, and the median income for a family was $57,870. Males had a median income of $45,171 versus $27,093 for females. The per capita income for the township was $23,379. About 3.3% of families and 3.9% of the population were below the poverty line, including 3.5% of those under age 18 and 7.5% of those age 65 or over.
