= Roxand Township, Michigan =

- Township
- Location within the state of Michigan
- Coordinates: 42°44′7″N 84°54′15″W
- Country: United States
- State: Michigan
- County: Eaton

Area
  - Total: 36.5 sq mi (94.6 km^{2})
  - Land: 36.5 sq mi (94.5 km^{2})
  - Water: 0.039 sq mi (0.1 km^{2})
- Elevation: 889 ft (271 m)

Population (2020)
  - Total: 1,748
  - Density: 47.9/sq mi (18.5/km^{2})
- Time zone: Eastern
- FIPS code: 26-70020
- GNIS feature ID: 1627010

Roxand Township is a civil township of Eaton County in the U.S. state of Michigan. The population was 1,848 at the 2010 census, and went down to 1,748 at the 2020 census.

== Communities ==
- The Village of Mulliken is within the township.
- Hoytville
- Needmore is a tiny unincorporated community at the southeast corner of the township, along the boundary with Chester Township at 42°41′00″N 84°51′22″W near the intersection of Needmore Hwy and Wheaton Rd.

== Geography ==
According to the US Census Bureau, the township has a total area of 36.5 square miles (95 km^{2}), of which 36.5 square miles (95 km^{2}) is land and 0.04 square miles (0.10 km^{2}) (0.08%) is water.

== Demographics ==
As of the 2000 United States census, there were 1,903 people, 658 households, and 529 families in the township. The population density was 52.2 inhabitants per square mile (20.2/km^{2}). There were 690 housing units at an average density of 18.9 per square mile (7.3/km^{2}). The racial makeup of the township was 96.90% White, 0.37% African American, 0.47% Native American, 0.11% Asian, 0.74% from other races, and 1.42% from two or more races. Hispanic or Latino of any race were 1.89% of the population.

There were 658 households, out of which 38.4% had children under the age of 18 living with them, 68.4% were married couples living together, 7.6% had a female householder with no husband present, and 19.6% were non-families. 14.7% of all households were made up of individuals, and 6.5% had someone living alone who was 65 years of age or older. The average household size was 2.88 and the average family size was 3.17.

The township population contained 27.4% under the age of 18, 8.1% from 18 to 24, 29.0% from 25 to 44, 24.2% from 45 to 64, and 11.4% who were 65 years of age or older. The median age was 37 years. For every 100 females, there were 106.2 males. For every 100 females age 18 and over, there were 105.7 males.

The median income for a household in the township was $51,216, and the median income for a family was $56,513. Males had a median income of $41,600 versus $27,727 for females. The per capita income for the township was $19,491. About 2.5% of families and 4.1% of the population were below the poverty line, including 5.7% of those under age 18 and 3.3% of those age 65 or over.
