= Walton Township, Michigan =

- Township
- Location within the state of Michigan Walton Township, Michigan (the United States)
- Coordinates: 42°28′07″N 84°53′41″W
- Country: United States
- State: Michigan
- County: Eaton
- Organized: 1839

Area
  - Total: 35.4 sq mi (91.7 km^{2})
  - Land: 35.2 sq mi (91.2 km^{2})
  - Water: 0.19 sq mi (0.5 km^{2})
- Elevation: 892 ft (272 m)

Population (2020)
  - Total: 2,293
  - Density: 65.1/sq mi (25.1/km^{2})
- Time zone: UTC-5 (Eastern (EST))
  - Summer (DST): UTC-4 (EDT)
- ZIP code: 48813 (Charlotte), 49076 (Olivet)
- FIPS code: 26-83180
- GNIS feature ID: 1627211
- Website: https://www.waltontwpmi.com/

Walton Township is a civil township of Eaton County in the U.S. state of Michigan. The population was 2,293 at the 2020 census.

== History ==
Speculators began making land entries in the area that became Walton Township as early as 1832. Captain James W. Hickok became the first settler in 1836, and was the first postmaster of what was then known as East Bellevue. Walton Township was organized in 1839, with the second settler, Parlery P. Shumway as the first supervisor.

== Communities ==
- The city of Olivet in the southwest part of the township is the only incorporated municipality in the township. The Olivet ZIP code 49076 serves most of Walton Township.
- The city of Charlotte is to the north-northeast, and the Charlotte ZIP code 48813 serves areas in the northern part of Walton Township.
- Ainger was a station on the Grand Trunk Railway at 42°28′58″N 84°56′04″W. A post office was established on March 16, 1882, with Carl F. Meads as the first postmaster. The name was changed to Thurman on February 13, 1889, then back to Ainger on May 9, 1889, and was closed on February 28. 1910. It is thought to have been named for state official Daniel B. Ainger.
- East Walton was a rural post office named for its location in the township, operating from April 3, 1866, until January 17, 1864.
- Five Points Corner is a named populated place south of the city of Charlotte at 42°30′33″N 84°50′08″W. The community is at the junction of four townships: Walton to the southwest, Brookfield to the southeast, Eaton to the northeast, and Carmel to the northwest.
- Moore's or Moore's Station was a station on the Chicago and Lake Huron Railroad north of Olivet in 1876.
- Walton is the name of a former post office in the township. It first opened on August 24, 1838, as East Bellevue, from its location relative to Bellevue. After Walton Township was organized in 1839, the post office was renamed Walton on December 31, 1840, and operated until August 17, 1849.

== Geography ==
According to the United States Census Bureau, the township has a total area of 35.4 square miles (92 km^{2}), of which 35.2 square miles (91 km^{2}) is land and 0.2 square miles (0.52 km^{2}) (0.56%) is water.

== Demographics ==
As of the census of 2000, there were 2,011 people, 699 households, and 564 families residing in the township. The population density was 57.1 inhabitants per square mile (22.0/km^{2}). There were 732 housing units at an average density of 20.8 per square mile (8.0/km^{2}). The racial makeup of the township was 98.61% White, 0.25% African American, 0.35% Native American, 0.15% Asian, 0.05% Pacific Islander, 0.15% from other races, and 0.45% from two or more races. Hispanic or Latino of any race were 0.99% of the population.

There were 699 households, out of which 40.8% had children under the age of 18 living with them, 71.1% were married couples living together, 5.2% had a female householder with no husband present, and 19.3% were non-families. 15.5% of all households were made up of individuals, and 5.6% had someone living alone who was 65 years of age or older. The average household size was 2.85 and the average family size was 3.15.

In the township the population was spread out, with 29.0% under the age of 18, 7.5% from 18 to 24, 30.7% from 25 to 44, 24.8% from 45 to 64, and 8.0% who were 65 years of age or older. The median age was 35 years. For every 100 females, there were 104.8 males. For every 100 females age 18 and over, there were 105.0 males.

The median income for a household in the township was $50,571, and the median income for a family was $51,500. Males had a median income of $39,531 versus $26,076 for females. The per capita income for the township was $20,034. About 1.6% of families and 3.1% of the population were below the poverty line, including 2.5% of those under age 18 and 10.7% of those age 65 or over.
