= Kalamo Township, Michigan =

- Township
- Location within the state of Michigan Kalamo Township, Michigan (the United States)
- Coordinates: 42°33′13″N 85°0′19″W
- Country: United States
- State: Michigan
- County: Eaton

Area
  - Total: 36.8 sq mi (95.2 km^{2})
  - Land: 36.6 sq mi (94.9 km^{2})
  - Water: 0.12 sq mi (0.3 km^{2})
- Elevation: 935 ft (285 m)

Population (2020)
  - Total: 1,765
  - Density: 48.2/sq mi (18.6/km^{2})
- Time zone: UTC-5 (Eastern (EST))
  - Summer (DST): UTC-4 (EDT)
- FIPS code: 26-42220
- GNIS feature ID: 1626549

Kalamo Township is a general law township of Eaton County in the U.S. state of Michigan. The population was 1,765 at the 2020 census.

== Communities ==
- Carlisle is a historic locale in the township at the junction of Carlisle Highway and Lacey Lake Road at 42°33′11″N 84°57′59″W. Charles T. Moffat (sometimes recorded at "Moffit") built a large frame saw-mill in 1837. After the mill came into the ownership of Oliver A. Hyde, the place became known as "Hyde's Mills". A post office named Carlisle was established in 1843 and operated until 1903.
- Elmira is a historic locale in the township along Ionia Road about three miles south of M-79. A post office operated here from 1855 until 1871.
- Kalamo is a small unincorporated community in the township along Ionia Road about two miles south of M-79 at 42°32′34″N 85°00′46″W.

== Geography ==
According to the United States Census Bureau, the township has a total area of 36.8 square miles (95 km^{2}), of which 36.6 square miles (95 km^{2}) is land and 0.1 square miles (0.26 km^{2}) (0.33%) is water.

== Demographics ==
As of the census of 2000, there were 1,742 people, 622 households, and 488 families residing in the township. The population density was 47.5 inhabitants per square mile (18.3/km^{2}). There were 648 housing units at an average density of 17.7 per square mile (6.8/km^{2}). The racial makeup of the township was 97.53% White, 0.86% African American, 0.11% Native American, 0.23% Asian, 0.40% from other races, and 0.86% from two or more races. Hispanic or Latino of any race were 0.63% of the population.

There were 622 households, out of which 35.5% had children under the age of 18 living with them, 69.1% were married couples living together, 4.7% had a female householder with no husband present, and 21.5% were non-families. 17.0% of all households were made up of individuals, and 5.6% had someone living alone who was 65 years of age or older. The average household size was 2.78 and the average family size was 3.13.

In the township the population was spread out, with 26.8% under the age of 18, 7.5% from 18 to 24, 30.0% from 25 to 44, 26.3% from 45 to 64, and 9.5% who were 65 years of age or older. The median age was 37 years. For every 100 females, there were 103.7 males. For every 100 females age 18 and over, there were 101.9 males.

The median income for a household in the township was $46,927, and the median income for a family was $50,208. Males had a median income of $37,981 versus $26,818 for females. The per capita income for the township was $17,934. About 3.7% of families and 5.3% of the population were below the poverty line, including 4.8% of those under age 18 and 8.2% of those age 65 or over.
