= Bellevue Township, Michigan =

- Township
- Location within the state of Michigan Bellevue Township, Michigan (the United States)
- Coordinates: 42°26′58″N 85°0′58″W
- Country: United States
- State: Michigan
- County: Eaton

Area
  - Total: 36.6 sq mi (94.7 km^{2})
  - Land: 36.4 sq mi (94.2 km^{2})
  - Water: 0.19 sq mi (0.5 km^{2})
- Elevation: 920 ft (280 m)

Population (2020)
  - Total: 3,200
  - Density: 88/sq mi (34/km^{2})
- Time zone: UTC-5 (Eastern (EST))
  - Summer (DST): UTC-4 (EDT)
- ZIP code: 49021
- Area code: 269
- FIPS code: 26-07080
- GNIS feature ID: 1625910
- Website: https://bellevuetownship.org/

Bellevue Township is a civil township of Eaton County in the U.S. state of Michigan. As of the 2020 census, the township population was 3,200.

The Village of Bellevue is located within the township.

== Geography ==
According to the United States Census Bureau, the township has a total area of 36.6 square miles (95 km^{2}), of which 36.4 square miles (94 km^{2}) is land and 0.2 square miles (0.52 km^{2}) (0.55%) is water.

== Demographics ==
As of the census of 2000, there were 3,144 people, 1,161 households, and 895 families residing in the township. In 2019, according to the Michigan Township Association, the total population was 3,175, with 1513 being male and 1637 being female and 25 foreign people not considered citizens in the township. The population density was 86.4 inhabitants per square mile (33.4/km^{2}). There were 1,211 housing units at an average density of 33.3 per square mile (12.9/km^{2}). The racial makeup of the township was 96.72% White, 0.48% African American, 0.25% Native American, 0.32% Asian, 0.16% Pacific Islander, 0.57% from other races, and 1.49% from two or more races. Hispanic or Latino of any race were 2.35% of the population.

There were 1,161 households, out of which 34.7% had children under the age of 18 living with them, 63.8% were married couples living together, 9.4% had a female householder with no husband present, and 22.9% were non-families. 20.8% of all households were made up of individuals, and 8.7% had someone living alone who was 65 years of age or older. The average household size was 2.70 and the average family size was 3.09.

In the township the population was spread out, with 26.8% under the age of 18, 9.0% from 18 to 24, 27.6% from 25 to 44, 24.2% from 45 to 64, and 12.4% who were 65 years of age or older. The median age was 37 years. For every 100 females, there were 96.4 males. For every 100 females age 18 and over, there were 93.4 males.

The median income for a household in the township was $43,393, and the median income for a family was $51,440. This had increased by 2019, where the median household income was $49,937 and median family income was $60,625. Males had a median income of $34,592 versus $27,372 for females. The per capita income for the township was $17,586. About 4.7% of families and 6.1% of the population were below the poverty line, including 9.0% of those under age 18 and 6.4% of those age 65 or over.
