= Olivet, Michigan =

- City
- Location of Olivet inside Eaton County
- Coordinates: 42°26′38″N 84°55′29″W
- Country: United States
- State: Michigan
- County: Eaton
- Founded(College): 1844
- Incorporated as village: 1867/68
- Incorporated as a city: 1958
- Named for: Mount Olivet

Government
  - Mayor: Laura Barlond-Maas

Area
  - Total: 1.02 sq mi (2.65 km^{2})
  - Land: 1.02 sq mi (2.64 km^{2})
  - Water: 0 sq mi (0.00 km^{2})
- Elevation: 919 ft (280 m)

Population (2020)
  - Total: 1,517
  - Density: 1,487.1/sq mi (574.19/km^{2})
- Time zone: UTC-5 (Eastern (EST))
  - Summer (DST): UTC-4 (EDT)
- ZIP code: 49076
- Area code: 269
- FIPS code: 26-60580
- GNIS feature ID: 1626844
- Website: http://www.cityofolivet.org/

Olivet is a city in Eaton County in the U.S. state of Michigan. The population was 1,517 at the 2020 census. University Of Olivet is located in the city.

== History ==
From its founding in 1844 through the 1910 census, Olivet was a village within Walton Township. It was incorporated into a city in 1958.

== Geography ==
According to the United States Census Bureau, the city has a total area of 1.02 square miles (2.64 km^{2}), all land.

== Demographics ==
Historical population
Census	Pop.	Note	%±
1870	526		—
1880	520		−1.1%
1890	790		51.9%
1900	800		1.3%
1910	627		−21.6%
1920	500		−20.3%
1930	566		13.2%
1940	604		6.7%
1950	887		46.9%
1960	1,185		33.6%
1970	1,629		37.5%
1980	1,604		−1.5%
1990	1,604		0.0%
2000	1,758		9.6%
2010	1,605		−8.7%
2020	1,517		−5.5%
U.S. Decennial Census

=== 2020 census ===
As of the 2020 census, Olivet had a population of 1,517. The median age was 21.6 years. 15.5% of residents were under the age of 18 and 8.8% of residents were 65 years of age or older. For every 100 females there were 119.9 males, and for every 100 females age 18 and over there were 119.1 males age 18 and over.

0.0% of residents lived in urban areas, while 100.0% lived in rural areas.

There were 392 households in Olivet, of which 35.7% had children under the age of 18 living in them. Of all households, 39.3% were married-couple households, 23.0% were households with a male householder and no spouse or partner present, and 29.1% were households with a female householder and no spouse or partner present. About 26.1% of all households were made up of individuals and 7.4% had someone living alone who was 65 years of age or older.

There were 468 housing units, of which 16.2% were vacant. The homeowner vacancy rate was 0.0% and the rental vacancy rate was 15.0%.

Racial composition as of the 2020 census
Race	Number	Percent
White	1,234	81.3%
Black or African American	173	11.4%
American Indian and Alaska Native	12	0.8%
Asian	10	0.7%
Native Hawaiian and Other Pacific Islander	0	0.0%
Some other race	9	0.6%
Two or more races	79	5.2%
Hispanic or Latino (of any race)	44	2.9%

=== 2010 census ===
As of the census of 2010, there were 1,605 people, 426 households, and 247 families living in the city. The population density was 1,573.5 inhabitants per square mile (607.5/km^{2}). There were 483 housing units at an average density of 473.5 per square mile (182.8/km^{2}). The racial makeup of the city was 89.8% White, 6.8% African American, 0.2% Native American, 0.6% Asian, 0.7% from other races, and 1.9% from two or more races. Hispanic or Latino of any race were 3.1% of the population.

There were 426 households, of which 30.8% had children under the age of 18 living with them, 38.0% were married couples living together, 14.3% had a female householder with no husband present, 5.6% had a male householder with no wife present, and 42.0% were non-families. 26.5% of all households were made up of individuals, and 6.6% had someone living alone who was 65 years of age or older. The average household size was 2.52 and the average family size was 3.04.

The median age in the city was 21.7 years. 15.4% of residents were under the age of 18; 47.7% were between the ages of 18 and 24; 15.9% were from 25 to 44; 15% were from 45 to 64; and 6% were 65 years of age or older. The gender makeup of the city was 52.4% male and 47.6% female.

=== 2000 census ===
As of the census of 2000, there were 1,758 people, 474 households, and 293 families living in the city. The population density was 1,735.0 inhabitants per square mile (669.9/km^{2}). There were 488 housing units at an average density of 481.6 per square mile (185.9/km^{2}). The racial makeup of the city was 84.30% White, 9.61% African American, 1.65% Native American, 1.65% Asian, 0.06% Pacific Islander, 1.76% from other races, and 0.97% from two or more races. Hispanic or Latino of any race were 2.10% of the population.

There were 474 households, out of which 39.2% had children under the age of 18 living with them, 40.1% were married couples living together, 16.9% had a female householder with no husband present, and 38.0% were non-families. 28.1% of all households were made up of individuals, and 6.5% had someone living alone who was 65 years of age or older. The average household size was 2.58 and the average family size was 3.20.

In the city, the population was spread out, with 22.0% under the age of 18, 41.5% from 18 to 24, 20.3% from 25 to 44, 11.8% from 45 to 64, and 4.5% who were 65 years of age or older. The median age was 22 years. For every 100 females, there were 102.1 males. For every 100 females age 18 and over, there were 104.5 males.

The median income for a household in the city was $34,474, and the median income for a family was $40,781. Males had a median income of $30,602 versus $19,904 for females. The per capita income for the city was $11,682. About 8.0% of families and 10.7% of the population were below the poverty line, including 10.2% of those under age 18 and 5.7% of those age 65 or over.

== Education ==
- University of Olivet
- Olivet Community Schools
