= Carmel Township, Michigan =

- Township
- Location within the state of Michigan Carmel Township, Michigan (the United States)
- Coordinates: 42°32′2″N 84°53′17″W
- Country: United States
- State: Michigan
- County: Eaton

Area
  - Total: 34.2 sq mi (88.5 km^{2})
  - Land: 34.1 sq mi (88.4 km^{2})
  - Water: 0.039 sq mi (0.1 km^{2})
- Elevation: 902 ft (275 m)

Population (2020)
  - Total: 2,839
  - Density: 83.2/sq mi (32.1/km^{2})
- Time zone: UTC-5 (Eastern (EST))
  - Summer (DST): UTC-4 (EDT)
- Postal code: 48813
- Area code: 517
- FIPS code: 26-13380
- GNIS feature ID: 1626032
- Website: https://carmeltownship-mi.gov/

Carmel Township is a civil township of Eaton County in the U.S. state of Michigan. The population was 2,839 as of the 2020 census.

== Communities ==
- Five Points Corner is a named populated place south of the city of Charlotte at 42°30′33″N 84°50′08″W. The community is at the junction of four townships, Walton to the southwest, Brookfield to the southeast, Eaton to the northeast, and Carmel to the northwest.

The Legislature of Michigan formally organized Carmel Township on March 21, 1839. Most of the early settlers were from New York and Vermont and were attracted to the township by its rich agricultural land. Carmel's early history was identified with Charlotte, around which most of the principal settlements were made. Charlotte, in fact, was the place for township meetings of both Carmel and Eaton Townships for many years. The earliest industry was a brick and tile factory established in section 15 by the firm of Dunning and Chappell employing eight men.

== Geography ==
According to the United States Census Bureau, the township has a total area of 34.2 square miles (89 km^{2}), of which 34.1 square miles (88 km^{2}) is land and 0.04 square miles (0.10 km^{2}), or 0.09%, is water.

== Demographics ==
As of the census of 2010, there were 2,855 people, 1,119 households, and 767 families residing in the township. The population density was 77.0 inhabitants per square mile (29.7/km^{2}). There were 1,119 housing units at an average density of 27.8 per square mile (10.7/km^{2}). The racial makeup of the township was 97.72% White, 0.08% African American, 0.27% Native American, 0.15% Asian, 0.61% from other races, and 1.18% from two or more races. Hispanic or Latino of any race made up 2.36% of the population.

There were 1,119 households, out of which 36.4% had children under the age of 18 living with them, 74.1% were married couples living together, 6.0% had a female householder with no husband present, and 16.9% were non-families. 13.0% of all households were made up of individuals, and 4.7% had someone living alone who was 65 years of age or older. The average household size was 2.83 and the average family size was 3.08.

In the township the population was spread out in age with 27.6% under the age of 18, 6.5% from 18 to 24, 27.5% from 25 to 44, 28.3% from 45 to 64, and 10.2% who were 65 years of age or older. The median age was 38 years. For every 100 females, there were 96.4 males, and for every 100 females age 18 and over, there were 95.1 males.

The median income for a household in the township was $53,229, and the median income for a family was $58,188. Males had a median income of $40,533 versus $27,196 for females. The per capita income for the township was $21,176. About 1.4% of families and 3.6% of the population were below the poverty line, including 3.8% of those under age 18 and 2.3% of those age 65 or over.
