= First Congregational Church (Charlotte, Michigan) =

Historic church in Michigan, United States

- U.S. National Register of Historic Places
- U.S. Historic district – Contributing property
- Michigan State Historic Site
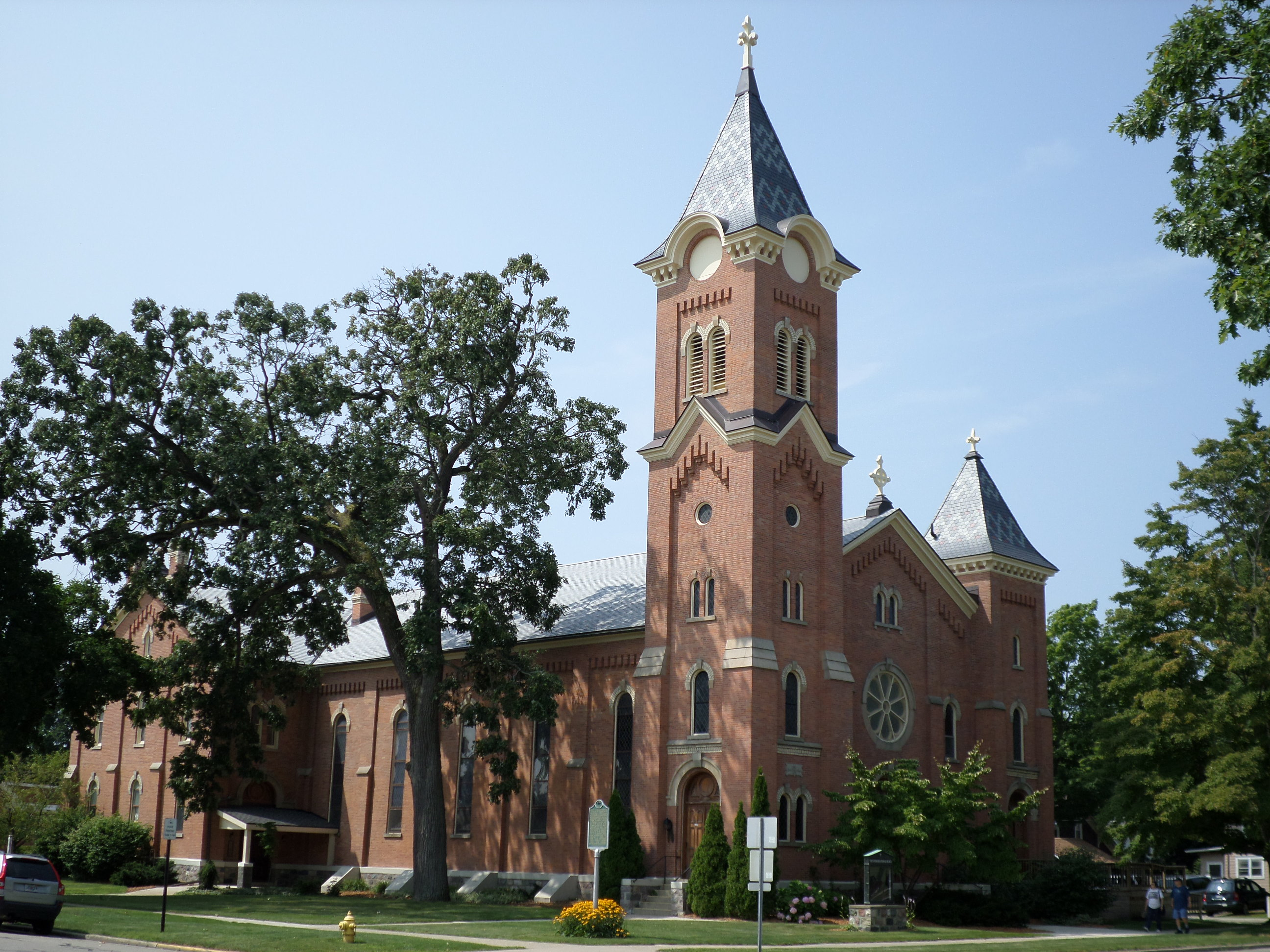
- The First Congregational Church, August 2014

- Location within Michigan Location within the United States
- Interactive map
- Location: 106 S. Bostwick St., Charlotte, Michigan
- Coordinates: 42°33′49″N 84°50′16″W
- Area: less than one acre
- Built: 1872
- Architect: Charles H. Marsh; W.H. Wells and Brothers
- Architectural style: Romanesque
- Part of: Charlotte Central Historic District (ID100002684)
- NRHP reference No.: 93000872

Significant dates
- Added to NRHP: August 26, 1993
- Designated MSHS: February 11, 1972

The First Congregational Church is a historic church located at 106 South Bostwick Street in Charlotte, Michigan. It was built in 1872 and added to the National Register of Historic Places in 1993. It continues to serve as a Congregational church.

== History ==
The First Congregational Church in Charlotte was founded in 1851 by Rev. Joseph Dunton. They first met in the surrounding township, but in 1852 moved to the village of Charlotte. By 1854 they were meeting at the county courthouse, and in 1856 constructed a frame church for worship. Charlotte quickly grew, and in 1866 the congregation agreed to construct a new and larger place of worship. However, due to a lack of funds, the 1856 church was enlarged instead, In 1871 the congregation revisited the matter, and purchased the present site for the church. In 1872, they selected New York architect Charles H. Marsh to design the church. The cornerstone was laid in 1873. The rear wing was constructed first, and dedicated in 1876. It wasn't until 1880 that the entire church, including the auditorium, was completed.

In 1881, a Steele and Turner pipe organ was installed, and a bell hing in the tower. The organ was replaced in 1945, and the pews were replaced in 1961.

== Description ==
The First Congregational Church of Charlotte is a large L-shaped gable-roof "round arch" building constructed of reddish-orange brick. The window and door openings all have distinctive round archways. The church consists of a main rectangular auditorium section with a two-story lecture room section that projects from the rear, with the entire structure measuring 125 feet by 75 feet. Two square plan pyramid-roof towers project from the front facade, one taller than the other. The main entrance in the front is through a central double door entrance, which secondary entrances are in the base of each tower. The auditorium has narrow, tall, round-head windows extending two stories in height, separated by buttresses. The lecture room section has round-head windows on each story, also separated by piers.

On the inside, a vestibule extends across the entire front, which leads to the auditorium proper. Staircases lead to the basement level and up to the gallery above the vestibule. The auditorium is a single room with a central and two side aisles with pews in between. A platform at the end holds a lectern and pulpit. A door opens into the lecture room portion of the building. All windows in the auditorium contain stained glass, made by W.H. Wells & Bros. of Chicago in 1879. The lecture room section contains offices and meeting rooms, Sunday School rooms, and a nursery.
