= Charlotte station =

Charlotte station may refer to:

- Charlotte station (Amtrak), a train station in Charlotte, North Carolina
- Charlotte station (Michigan Central Railroad), a former station in Charlotte, Michigan
- Charlotte station (Seaboard Air Line Railroad), a former station in Charlotte, North Carolina
- Charlotte Transportation Center, an intermodal transit center in Charlotte, North Carolina
- Joséphine-Charlotte metro station, a metro station in Brussels, Belgium
