= Bruske =

Bruske may refer to:

- Jim Bruske (born 1964), American baseball player
- Paul H. Bruske (1877–1956), American writer, journalist, advertising executive, and sportsman
