= Charlotte Central Historic District =

- U.S. National Register of Historic Places
- U.S. Historic district
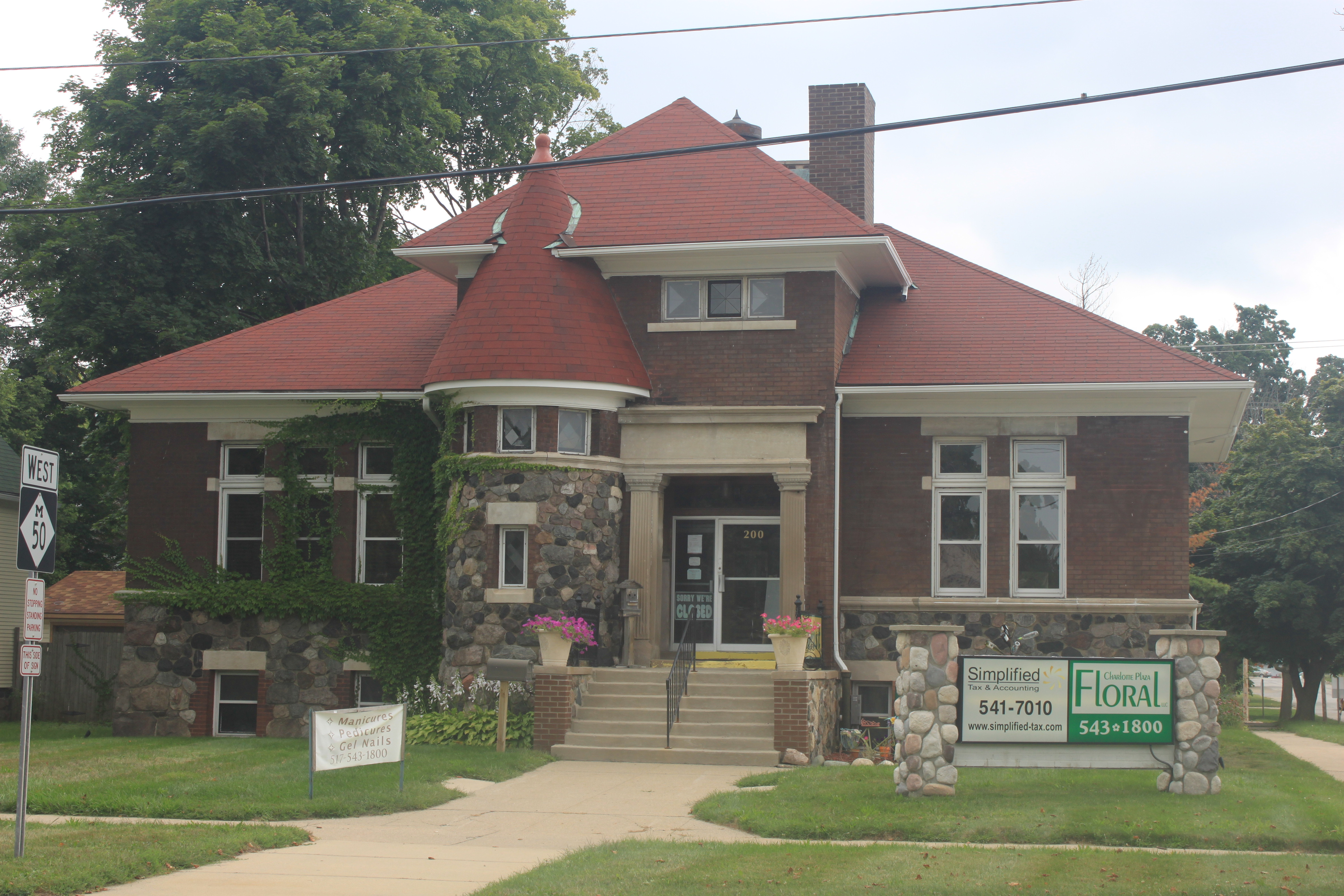
- Carnegie Library

- Location within Michigan Location within the United States
- Interactive map
- Location: Cochran Ave. & adjacent streets; West McClure St. to south of Henry St., Charlotte, Michigan
- Coordinates: 42°33′44″N 84°50′9″W
- NRHP reference No.: 100002684
- Added to NRHP: October 16, 2020

The Charlotte Central Historic District is a mixed commercial, residential, and historic district located in the downtown section of Charlotte, Michigan. The district stretches along Cochran Avenue from West McClure Street to south of Henry Street, containing portions of the streets adjacent to Cochran. It was listed on the National Register of Historic Places in 2020.

== Description ==
The Charlotte Central Historic District contains 328 buildings, of which 288 contribute to the historic character of the district. The district contains the commercial center of Charlotte, as well as adjacent residential neighborhoods containing both large, architect-designed homes and more modest middle-class houses. It also contains early industrial buildings, and other structures surrounding the railroad junction on the north portion of the district. Most of these buildings are two stories in height, and primarily date from the late nineteenth century. The district contains a range of Italianate and Late Victorian commercial blocks. Residential architectural styles include Greek Revival, Queen Anne, Italianate, and later International style and Mid-Century Modern structures.

The most significant buildings in the district include:

- Eaton County Courthouse, constructed in 1885 and individually listed in the National Register.
- First Congregational Church, constructed in 1881 and individually listed in the National Register.
- Michigan Central Railroad depot, constructed in 1902 and individually listed in the National Register.
- Grand Trunk Western Railroad depot, constructed in 1885.
- Lawrence Avenue Methodist Church, constructed in 1902–03.
- Carnegie Library, constructed in 1903.
- Masonic Temple, constructed in 1904.
- High school, constructed in 1914 with 1936 and 1955 additions.
- U. S. Post Office, constructed in 1917
- Michigan Bell Telephone Building, constructed in 1929.
- Eaton Theatre, constructed in 1931.

== History ==
Charlotte was first platted in 1838. The population steadily grew, and it was incorporated as a village in 1863. A few of the earliest structures in the district date to this time, notably the county building at 115 W. Lawrence, constructed c. 1841. A handful of Greek Revival houses also date from the middle of the 19th century.

The arrival of railroad lines - the Grand River Valley Railroad in 1868 and the Peninsular Railroad in 1870 - spurred the growth and development of Charlotte. By 1871, it was incorporated as a city. This timeframe marks the construction of some of the oldest commercial buildings in the district, clustered around the courthouse. During the 1880s, Charlotte experienced tremendous growth. Nearly 1/3 of the buildings in the district were constructed during the last two decades of the 19th century, including the largest public buildings and residences.

Another 1/3 of the buildings in the district were constructed during the first decades of the 20th century. However, as the city filled and the Great Depression hit, construction slowed, tapering off noticeably after 1950.

== Gallery ==
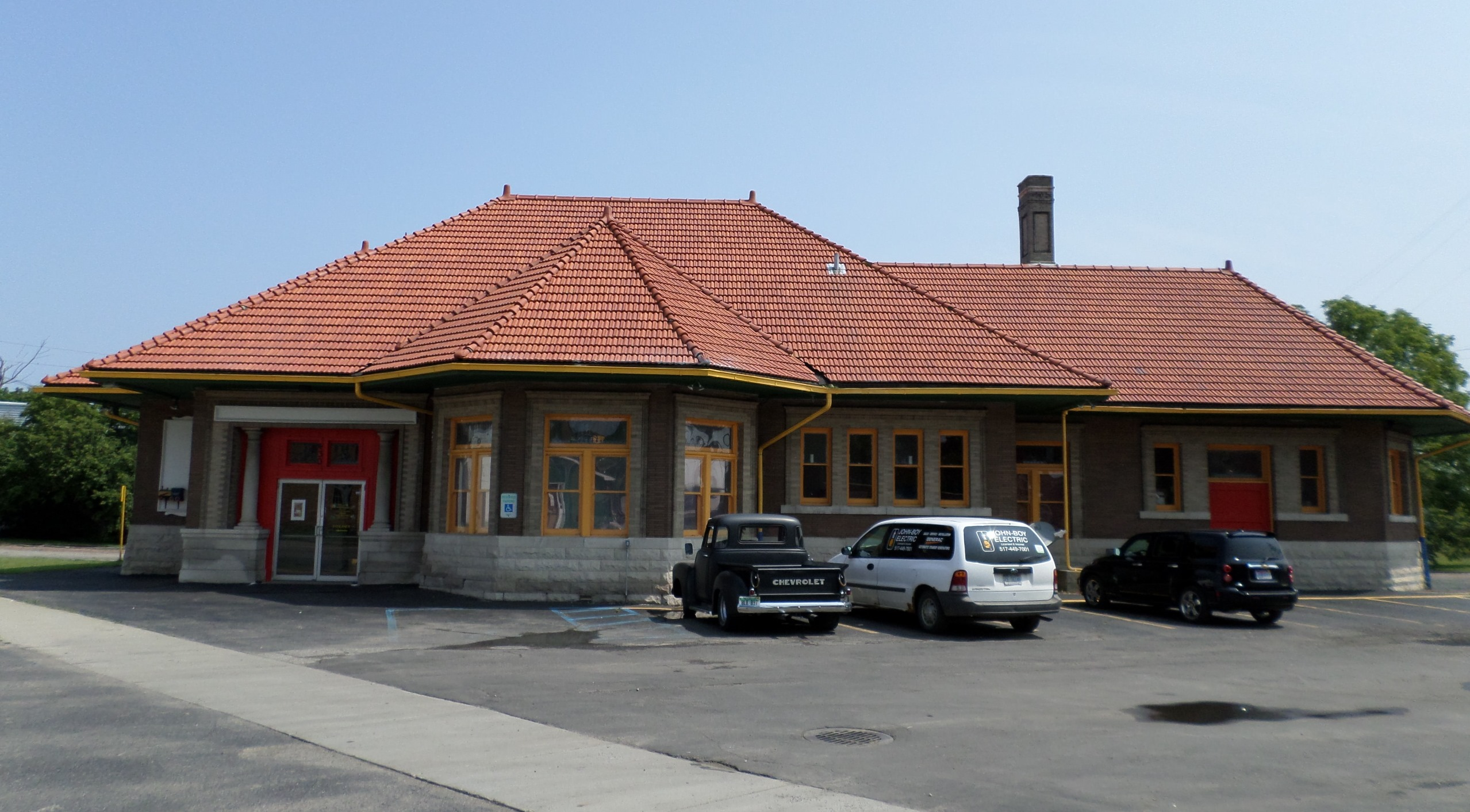
Michigan Central Railroad Charlotte Depo

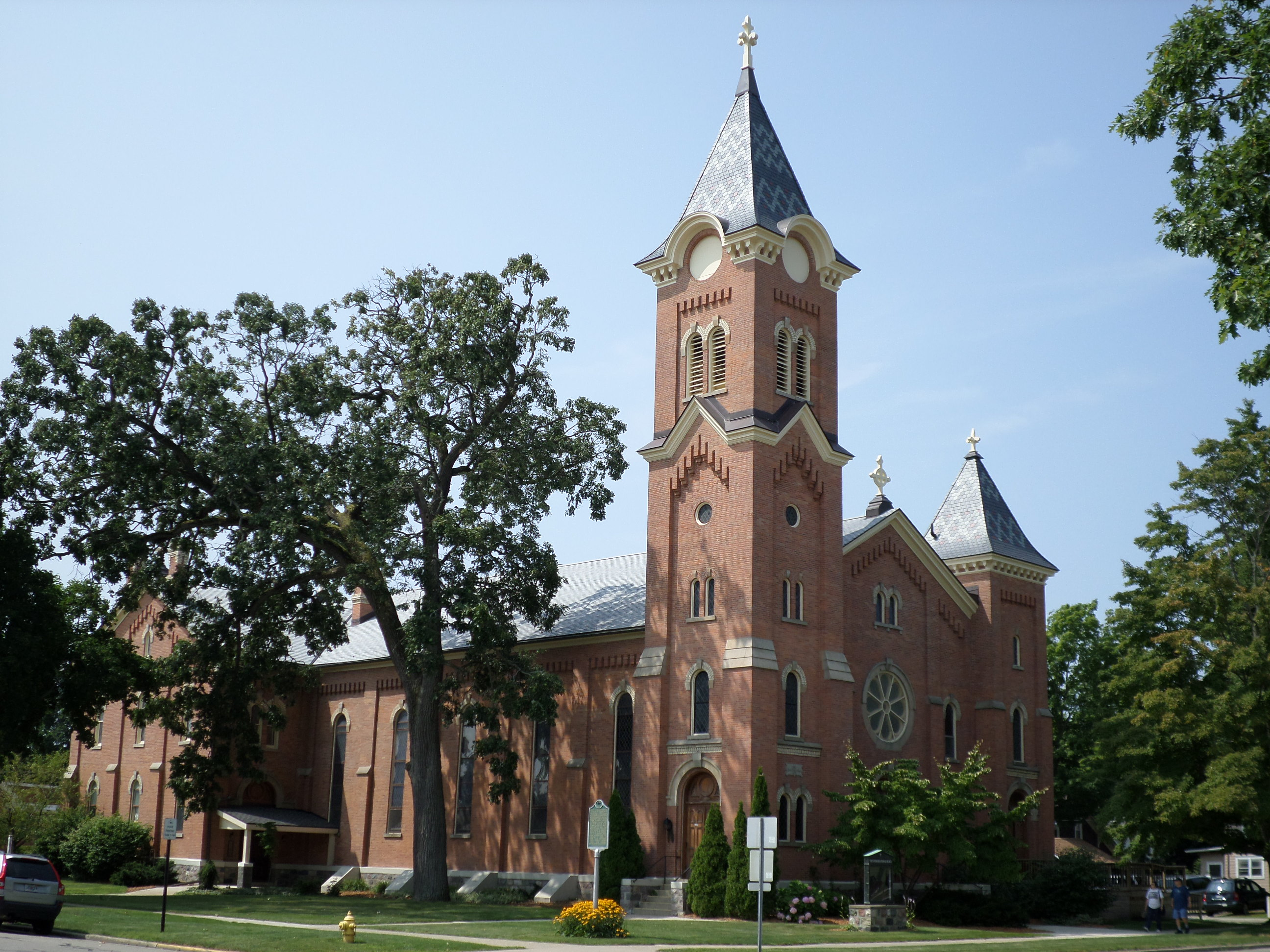
First Congregational Church

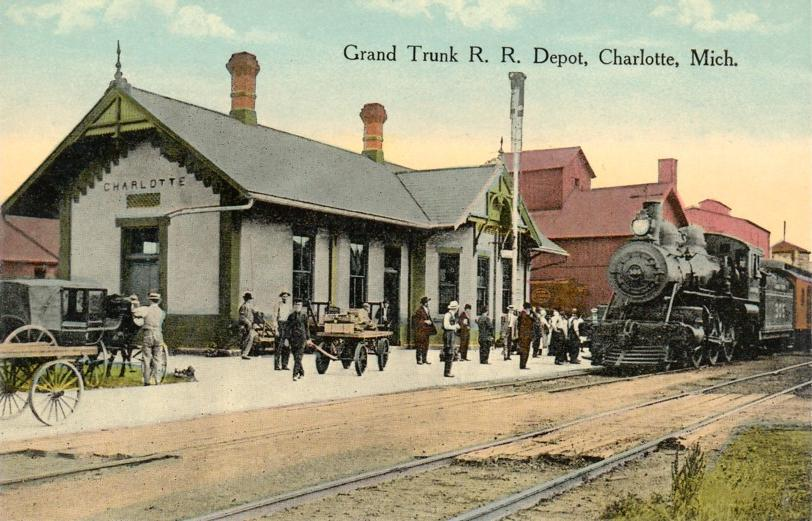
Grand Trunk Depot

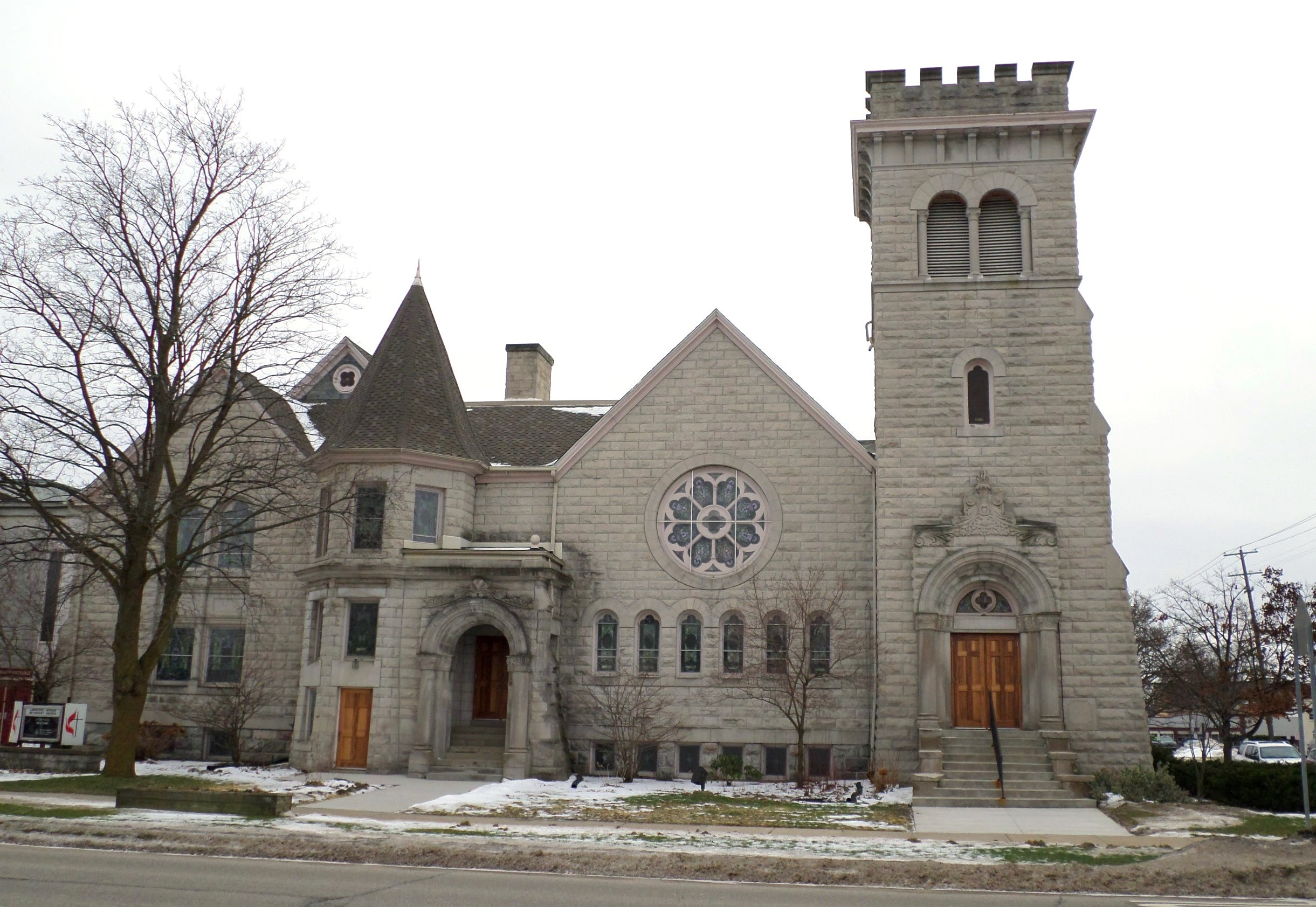
Lawrence Avenue United Methodist Church

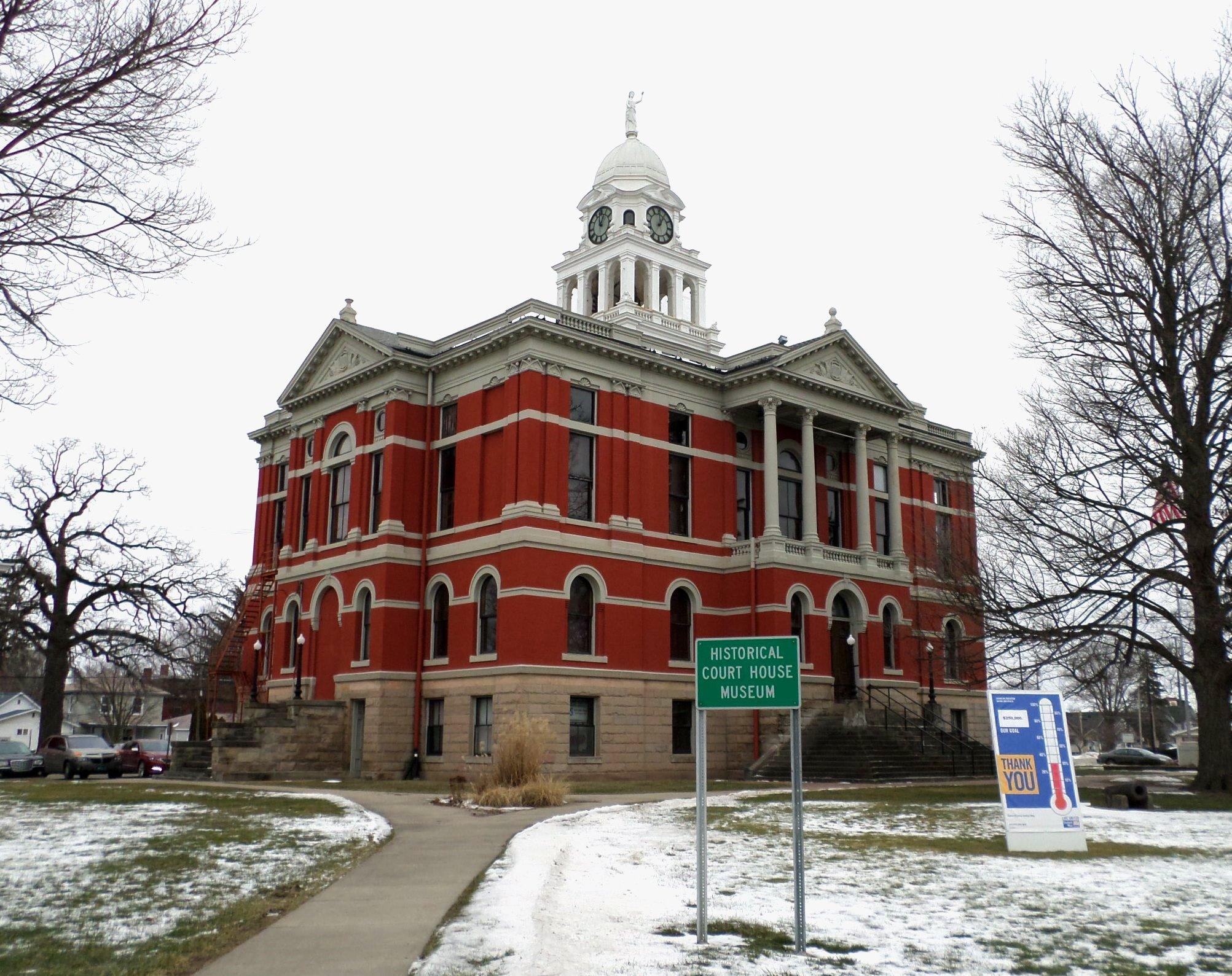
County Courthouse
