= State Wayne Theater =

Motion picture theater in Wayne, Michigan

Coordinates: 42.283°N 83.3867°W

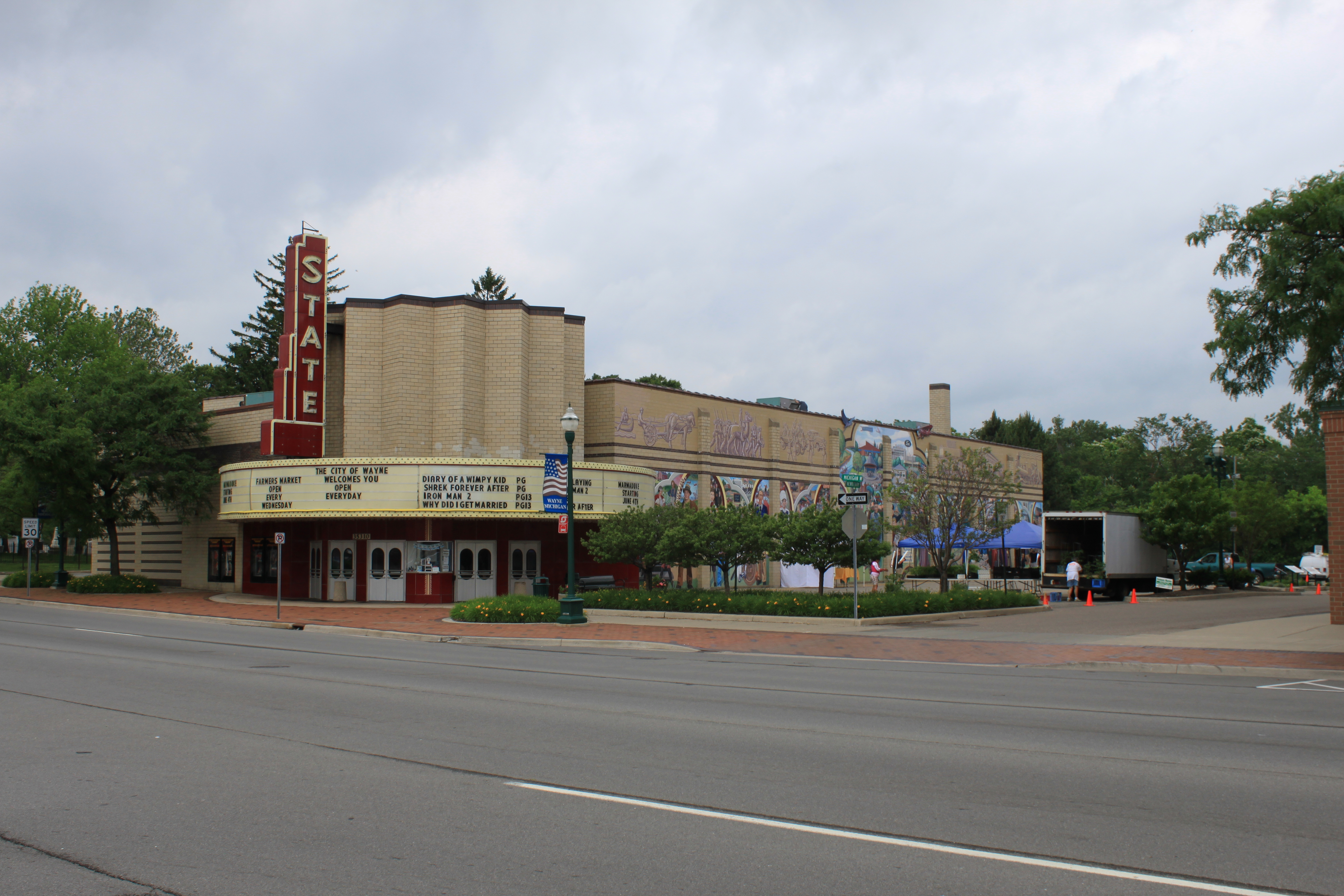
- Address: 35310 West Michigan Ave; Wayne, Michigan
- Operator: Phoenix Theatres
- Opened: 1946

Website
- https://www.phoenixmovies.net/theatres/classic-state-wayne/003

The State Wayne Theater (originally the State Theater, now known as the Phoenix State Wayne Theater for sponsorship reasons) is a motion picture theater located in Wayne, Michigan at 35310 Michigan Avenue. The multi-screen movie house is owned and operated by Phoenix Theaters and operates 3 screens which show first-run movies and a live performance stage.

== History ==
The idea to build a new theater in Wayne was underway as early as 1940 by Walter Shafer and his family, owners of the nearby Wayne Theater (which operated from 1927-51). Plans were drawn up and land was bought, but with the outbreak of World War II the construction was put on hold. The theater -- built of fireproof brick and cinder block -- was finally completed in 1946 with a modern art deco design, featuring a single 1,500 seat auditorium. The theater was officially called "The State Theater", but was colloquially known around the Detroit area as the "State Wayne." Local newspapers, such as the Detroit News and Detroit Free Press, referred to it as the "State - Wayne" in its movie listings, to avoid confusion with other movie houses by the same name in Ann Arbor and Pontiac.

In 1964, the theater underwent a $75,000 upgrade, replacing carpets, seats and upholstery. The lobby and theater were given a modern-Asian theme, complete with a fountain and lamps from India, and the famous Dragon Murals, painted by Dutch artist Anton Mom. At some point, the theater was divided into two screens. By the late 1970s, however, the theater was doing poorly due to competition from suburban multiplexes.

By 1979, the State Wayne was hosting country music shows.

In 1977, the theater closed, and was leased to the Michigan Opry who planned to hold live music events in the space. The live music plan folded after a few years and in 1980 the theater re-opened charging just 99 cents per ticket. The Shafer family, who had owned and operated the State Wayne for decades, sold the theater to National Amusements in 1986, who promptly closed it. In 1991, the city of Wayne stepped in and, using over $500,000 in downtown development authority funds, purchased and restored the State Wayne. The city divided the theater into three screens and a live stage, and operated the theater until 2012.

National chain Phoenix Theaters took over management of the city-owned theater in August 2012. In their first year of management, attendance was up 20 percent over the prior year and the operators were honored by the Wayne Chamber of Commerce as Wayne's "Business of the Year" for 2013. Phoenix bought the State Wayne outright in September 2014 and made further renovations, including 100 percent reclining seating, Christie digital projectors, and 7.1 Dolby Digital sound in every auditorium.

== Programming ==
The State Wayne shows first-run movies in its three main auditoriums.

The theater holds live performances of The Rocky Horror Picture Show, hosted by the Michigan Rocky Horror Preservation Society. These popular shows frequently sell out, and are held twice monthly.

== The Mural ==
The east wall of the State Wayne Theatre features the large, hand-painted Wayne History Mural. The mural panels are painted in shades of the creme brick color to create the illusion that they are ornamental carvings used in art-deco architecture. This painting style is called trompe-l'œil.

The mural depicts Wayne through four categories:

- People, Pride and Progress
- Industrial Growth
- Community Life
- A Road Runs Through It

The idea of creating public art was developed during Michigan Governor Jennifer Granholm’s “Cool Cities” initiative in 2003, which led to the Wayne City Council forming the 2020 Committee. The Wayne History Mural (painted by David Fichter and Joshua Winer, with help from Anthony Ivezaj) was dedicated on October 16, 2007 and re-dedicated on October 28, 2008 following the completion of additional panels.
