= Wayne, Michigan =

- City
- City of Wayne
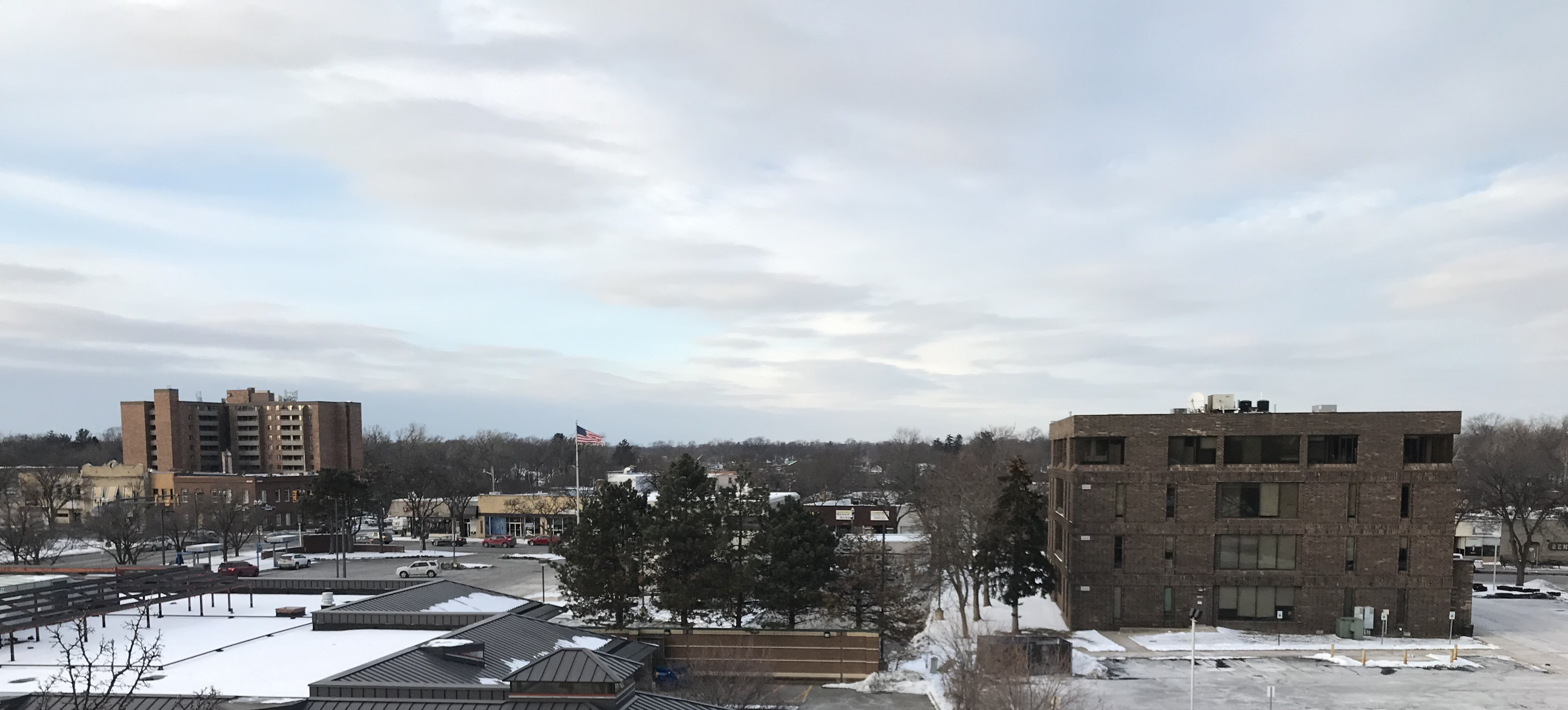
- Downtown Wayne

- Seal

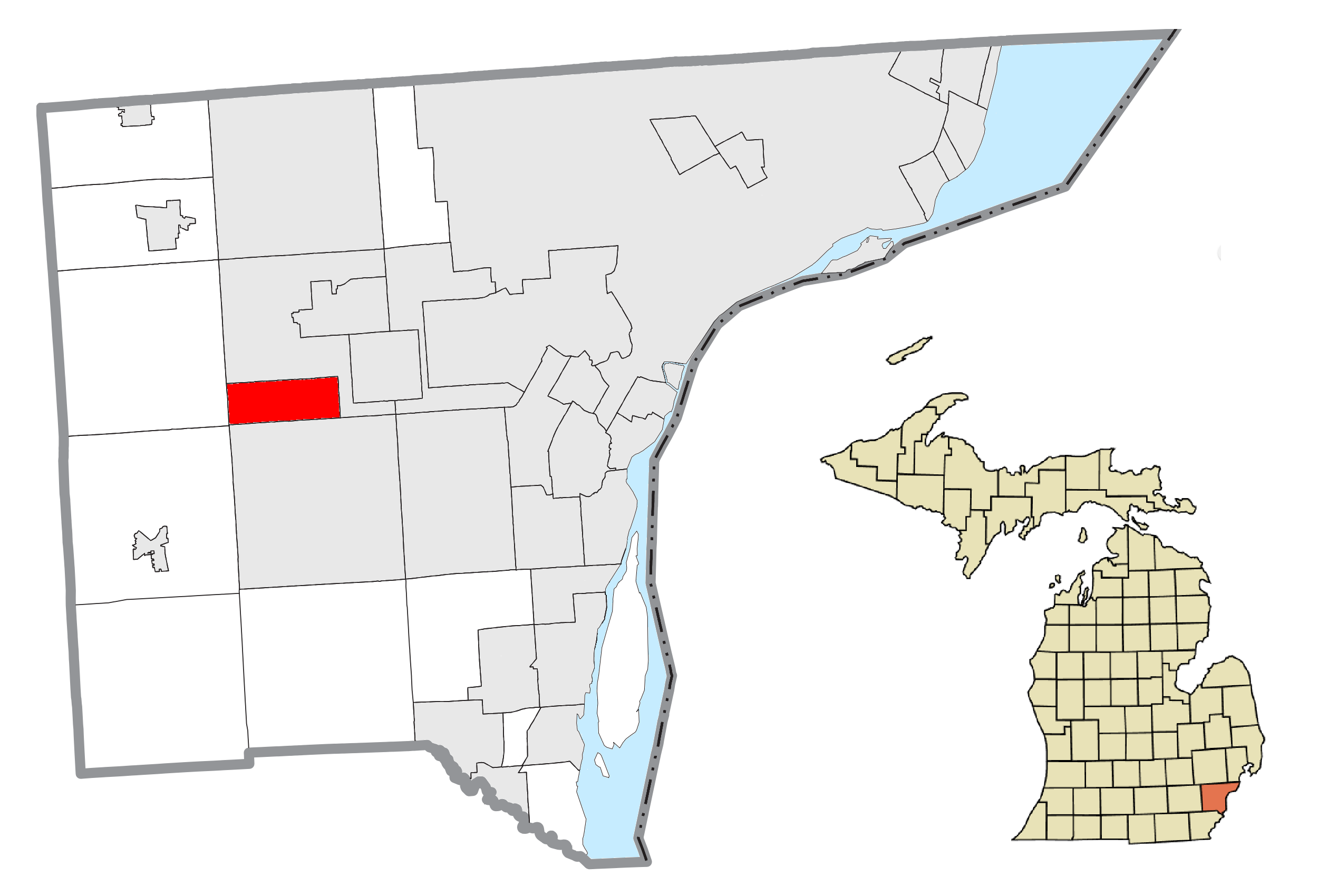
- Location within Wayne County

- Location within the state of Michigan Location within the United States
- Coordinates: 42°16′41″N 83°22′43″W
- Country: United States
- State: Michigan
- County: Wayne
- Settled: 1824
- Incorporated: 1869 (village); 1960 (city)
- Named for: Anthony Wayne

Government
  - Mayor: John Rhaesa
  - Manager: Lisa Nocerini

Area
  - City: 6.02 sq mi (15.59 km^{2})
  - Land: 6.02 sq mi (15.59 km^{2})
  - Water: 0 sq mi (0.00 km^{2})
- Elevation: 660 ft (200 m)

Population (2020)
  - City: 17,713
  - Density: 2,942/sq mi (1,136.1/km^{2})
  - Metro: 4,285,832 (Metro Detroit)
- Time zone: UTC-5 (EST)
  - Summer (DST): UTC-4 (EDT)
- ZIP code(s): 48184
- Area code: 734
- FIPS code: 26-84940
- GNIS feature ID: 1615901
- Website: Official website

Wayne is a city in Wayne County in the U.S. state of Michigan. A western suburb of Detroit, Wayne is located about 18 miles (29 km) southwest of downtown Detroit. As of the 2020 census, the city had a population of 17,713.

Wayne has a long history of automotive and transportation related manufacturing. Ford Motor Company currently has two plants in Wayne: Wayne Stamping & Assembly and the Michigan Assembly Plant, formerly known as the Michigan Truck Plant.

== History ==
The site of Wayne was crossed by the Sauk Trail, and due to this, the area was visited by Potawatomi and French fur traders for years before permanent settlement. The first settler was George M. Johnson, who built a small log cabin on 80 acres of land in 1824 (a state historical marker can now be found at the site). The cabin served as a tavern for travelers along the trail, by then known as the Chicago Road. The area soon became known as Johnson's Tavern. This settlement became located in Bucklin Township when it was organized in 1827, but soon found itself in Nankin Township when Bucklin was divided in 1829. After a few years, the tavern was sold to Stephen G. Simmons, who continued to operate the business until he murdered his wife while in a drunken rage. Simmons was arrested and taken to Detroit, where he was tried and hanged September 24, 1830. He became the last person to be executed in Michigan, as the territory abolished capital punishment shortly thereafter.

In 1832, Ezra Derby bought the tavern and land from the Simmons heirs and began establishing a settlement. Derby built a sawmill, store, mill, blacksmith shop and the first frame dwelling for himself. In 1834, a plat was recorded in Detroit with lots and a town square under the name Derby's Corners. In 1836, the name of the settlement was changed to Wayne, in honor of Revolutionary War General Anthony Wayne. Soon a small hamlet began to develop, which was accelerated by the arrival of the Michigan Central Railroad in 1838. The Chicago Road that ran through Wayne was paved with oak logs in 1850, becoming the Detroit and Saline Plank Road. In 1867 it was changed to its current name of Michigan Avenue. In 1869, Wayne was incorporated as a village within Nankin Township with a population of about 800 people. (In 1960 Wayne officially became a city.)

Many major industries have located in the village over the years. The Prouty and Glass Carriage Factory was the first, moving from Detroit in 1888. At the time, this made Wayne the largest carriage and sleigh producer in the country. In 1899, the Detroit interurban railroad (a streetcar system connecting Detroit to outlying towns) reached Wayne and ran until 1929. Ray Harroun, winner of the first Indianapolis 500, built the Harroun motor car in Wayne from 1916 to 1921. The Gotfredson Truck was produced from 1924 to 1927, and The Graham-Paige car company made vehicles in Wayne from 1928 to 1936. Stinson Aircraft was also located at the nearby Detroit Industrial Airport and produced small planes from 1926 to 1948. The Michigan Assembly Plant was built in 1957, and the Gar-Wood company built garbage trucks and hydraulic equipment from 1947 to 1972. Other major companies located in Wayne include Unistrut, which was invented in Wayne, and Wayne Industries.

The population and industrial production around Wayne significantly increased after World War II.

The 1960s saw a period of urban renewal in downtown Wayne, as the city sought to compete with its neighbors. Michigan Avenue had gone from a divided highway to a two-way undivided route between Pershing and 4th Streets, with Main Street to the south serving as an unofficial business route connecting to Michigan Avenue at both ends. As part of the redevelopment of the downtown area, Michigan Avenue received new eastbound lanes, routed one block south of Main Street along Norris Street, with the original undivided route retaining westbound traffic. Wayne Road was subsequently reconstructed to eliminate its original staggered intersection at the now-westbound Michigan Avenue, continuing along the former Washington Street alignment before turning 45 degrees to cross the new eastbound Michigan. Main Street's connections to Michigan Avenue were cut off, with the street now only running from Williams Street to Wayne Road, with a segment incorporated into the parking lot of the Town Square Plaza shopping center. The redevelopment ultimately did not result in the kind of growth the city had hoped for, though; in particular, the undersized Town Square Plaza could not compete with the larger Westland Shopping Center a few miles north.

== Geography ==
The city, located on the Lower River Rouge which bisects the city, is bound on the north by Glenwood Road, the west by Hannan Road, the south by Van Born Road, and on the east by Merriman Road.

According to the United States Census Bureau, the city has a total area of 6.02 square miles (15.59 km^{2}), all land.

== Demographics ==
Historical population
Census	Pop.	Note	%±
1860	304		—
1870	833		174.0%
1880	919		10.3%
1890	1,226		33.4%
1900	1,361		11.0%
1910	1,263		−7.2%
1920	1,899		50.4%
1930	3,423		80.3%
1940	4,223		23.4%
1950	9,409		122.8%
1960	16,034		70.4%
1970	21,054		31.3%
1980	21,159		0.5%
1990	19,899		−6.0%
2000	19,051		−4.3%
2010	17,593		−7.7%
2020	17,713		0.7%
U.S. Decennial Census

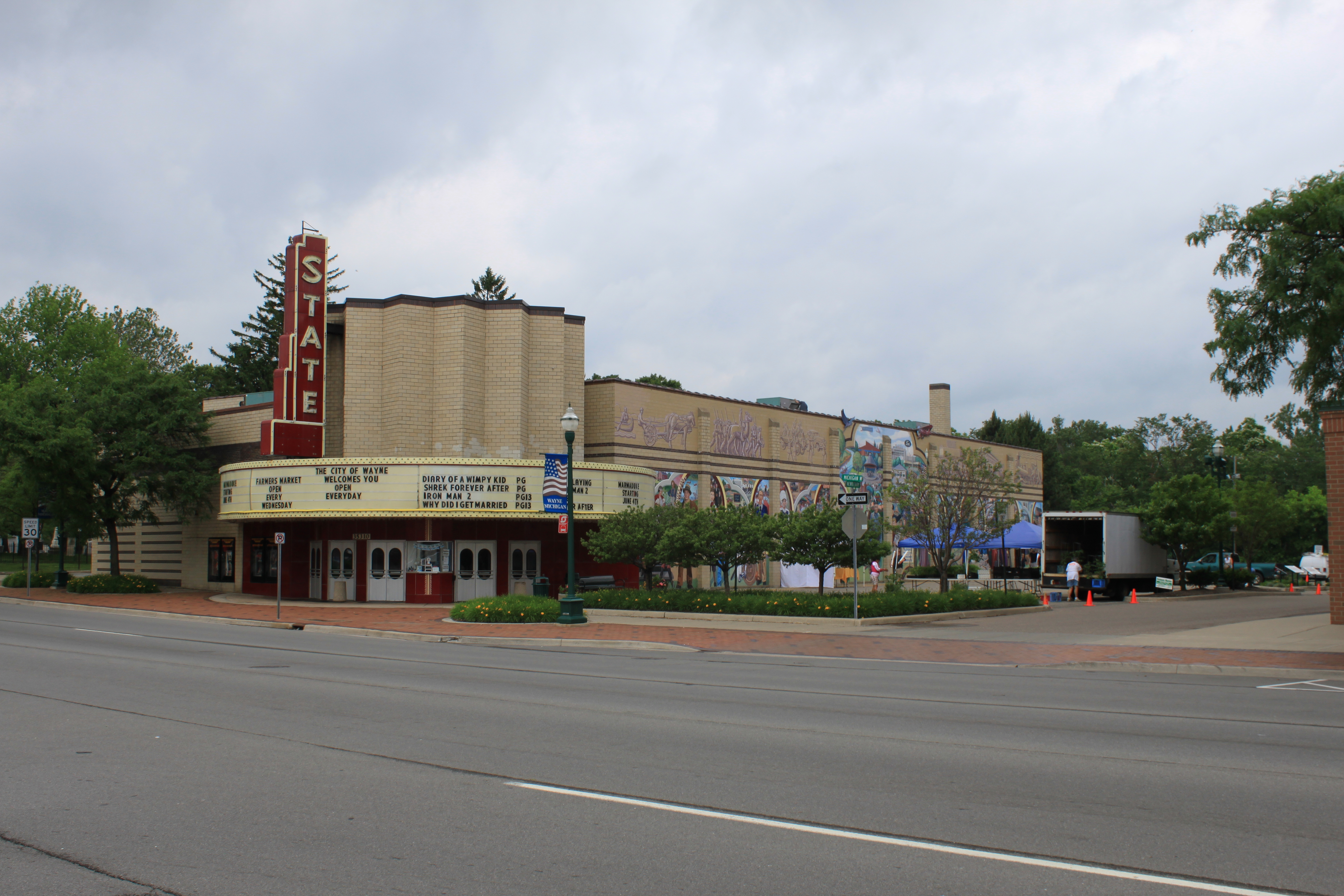
State Wayne Theater (1946)

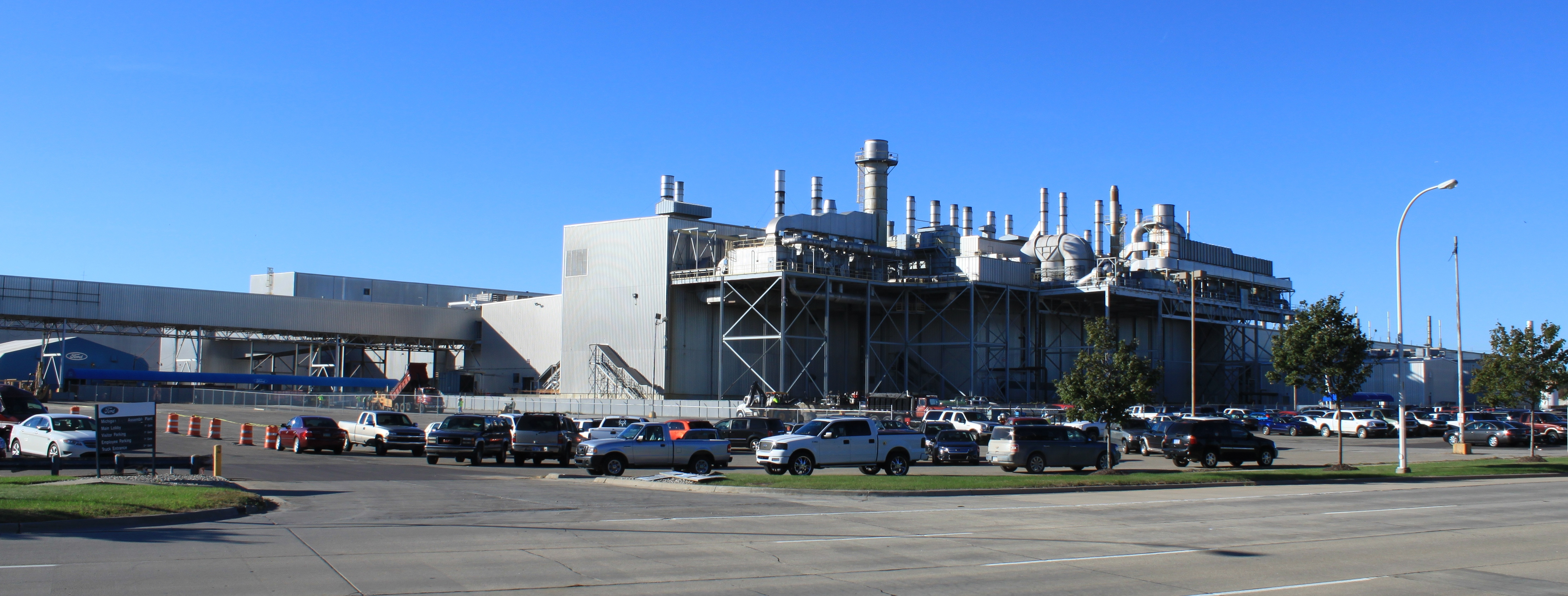
Michigan Assembly Plant

=== Racial and ethnic composition ===
Wayne city, Michigan – Racial and ethnic composition Note: the US Census treats Hispanic/Latino as an ethnic category. This table excludes Latinos from the racial categories and assigns them to a separate category. Hispanics/Latinos may be of any race.
Race / Ethnicity (NH = Non-Hispanic)	Pop 2000	Pop 2010	Pop 2020	% 2000	% 2010	% 2020
White alone (NH)	15,819	13,080	10,969	83.04%	74.35%	61.93%
Black or African American alone (NH)	2,145	2,964	4,147	11.26%	16.85%	23.41%
Native American or Alaska Native alone (NH)	106	75	76	0.56%	0.43%	0.43%
Asian alone (NH)	275	360	362	1.44%	2.05%	2.04%
Native Hawaiian or Pacific Islander alone (NH)	8	6	3	0.04%	0.03%	0.02%
Other race alone (NH)	20	51	120	0.10%	0.29%	0.68%
Mixed race or Multiracial (NH)	309	455	1,164	1.62%	2.59%	6.57%
Hispanic or Latino (any race)	369	602	872	1.94%	3.42%	4.92%
Total	19,051	17,593	17,713	100.00%	100.00%	100.00%

=== 2020 census ===
As of the 2020 census, Wayne had a population of 17,713. The median age was 39.8 years. 20.8% of residents were under the age of 18 and 15.6% of residents were 65 years of age or older. For every 100 females there were 94.1 males, and for every 100 females age 18 and over there were 92.2 males age 18 and over.

100.0% of residents lived in urban areas, while 0.0% lived in rural areas.

There were 7,434 households in Wayne, of which 27.9% had children under the age of 18 living in them. Of all households, 32.5% were married-couple households, 23.8% were households with a male householder and no spouse or partner present, and 35.2% were households with a female householder and no spouse or partner present. About 34.8% of all households were made up of individuals and 12.1% had someone living alone who was 65 years of age or older.

There were 7,801 housing units, of which 4.7% were vacant. The homeowner vacancy rate was 1.6% and the rental vacancy rate was 3.7%.

Racial composition as of the 2020 census
Race	Number	Percent
White	11,170	63.1%
Black or African American	4,195	23.7%
American Indian and Alaska Native	87	0.5%
Asian	368	2.1%
Native Hawaiian and Other Pacific Islander	6	0.0%
Some other race	342	1.9%
Two or more races	1,545	8.7%

=== 2010 census ===
As of the census of 2010, there were 17,593 people, 7,055 households, and 4,450 families living in the city. The population density was 2,922.4 inhabitants per square mile (1,128.3/km^{2}). There were 7,824 housing units at an average density of 1,299.7 per square mile (501.8/km^{2}). The racial makeup of the city was 76.3% White, 17.1% African American, 0.5% Native American, 2.1% Asian, 1.0% from other races, and 3.0% from two or more races. Hispanic or Latino of any race were 3.4% of the population.

There were 7,055 households, of which 32.6% had children under the age of 18 living with them, 38.9% were married couples living together, 18.3% had a female householder with no husband present, 5.9% had a male householder with no wife present, and 36.9% were non-families. 30.9% of all households were made up of individuals, and 10.3% had someone living alone who was 65 years of age or older. The average household size was 2.45 and the average family size was 3.06.

The median age in the city was 38.6 years. 23.5% of residents were under the age of 18; 9% were between the ages of 18 and 24; 26.8% were from 25 to 44; 28.2% were from 45 to 64; and 12.5% were 65 years of age or older. The gender makeup of the city was 48.2% male and 51.8% female.

=== 2000 census ===
As of the census of 2000, there were 19,051 people, 7,373 households, and 4,844 families living in the city. The population density was 3,165.2 inhabitants per square mile (1,222.1/km^{2}). There were 7,651 housing units at an average density of 1,271.2 per square mile (490.8/km^{2}). The racial makeup of the city was 84.36% White, 11.29% African American, 0.61% Native American, 1.44% Asian, 0.04% Pacific Islander, 0.43% from other races, and 1.82% from two or more races. Hispanic or Latino of any race were 1.94% of the population.

There were 7,373 households, out of which 33.0% had children under the age of 18 living with them, 45.2% were married couples living together, 15.7% had a female householder with no husband present, and 34.3% were non-families. 28.5% of all households were made up of individuals, and 9.3% had someone living alone who was 65 years of age or older. The average household size was 2.53 and the average family size was 3.13.

In the city, the population was spread out, with 26.4% under the age of 18, 8.5% from 18 to 24, 31.8% from 25 to 44, 21.6% from 45 to 64, and 11.7% who were 65 years of age or older. The median age was 35 years. For every 100 females, there were 92.6 males. For every 100 females age 18 and over, there were 89.5 males.

The median income for a household in the city was $46,397, and the median income for a family was $56,150. Males had a median income of $42,385 versus $28,069 for females. The per capita income for the city was $21,326. About 7.6% of families and 9.1% of the population were below the poverty line, including 10.9% of those under age 18 and 9.6% of those age 65 or over.

== Education ==
Schools of the Wayne-Westland Community School District located in Wayne include:

- Benjamin Franklin Middle School
- Roosevelt-McGrath Elementary School
- Taft-Galloway Elementary School
- Wayne Memorial High School

=== Private Schools ===
- St. Michael Lutheran School: PK-8th Grade
- St. Mary's Catholic School (permanently closed)
- St. Joseph's Catholic School

All residents are zoned to Adams Upper Elementary School in Westland, Benjamin Franklin Middle School in Wayne, and Wayne Memorial High School in Wayne, as well as Walker-Winter Elementary School in Canton.

== Notable people ==
- Bill Stafford, (1938–2001) was a professional baseball player known for his time with the New York Yankees.
- Shaggy 2 Dope, member of horrorcore rap duo Insane Clown Posse.
