= Paul H. Bruske =

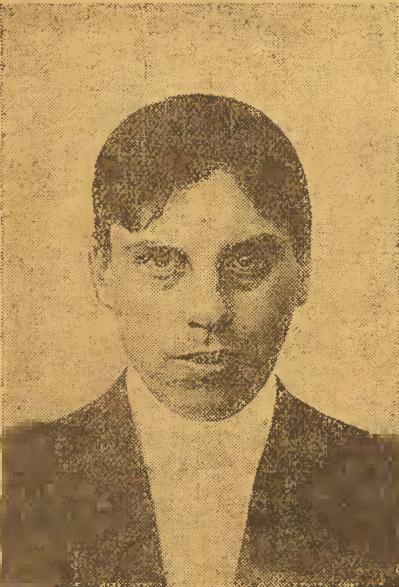
- Bruske from Sporting Life, 1908
- Born: November 7, 1877; Charlotte, Michigan, U.S.
- Died: September 26, 1956 (aged 78); Romeo, Michigan, U.S.
- Spouse: Mary Wheeler (Plum) Bruske
- Children: Paul Wheeler Bruske
- Parent: August Frederick Bruske

Paul Hale Bruske (November 7, 1877 – September 26, 1956) was an American writer, journalist, advertising executive, and sportsman.

Bruske was a baseball correspondent for Sporting Life from 1905 to 1914. He also wrote for several Michigan newspapers from 1898 to 1910. He covered the Detroit Tigers for 14 years, including their American League championship seasons of 1907, 1908, and 1909.

During the 1910s, he became involved in the automobile business. In 1910, he led the "Under Three Flags" automobile expedition from Quebec City to Mexico City, and in 1911 he participated in the Glidden Tour, a cross-country automobile race. From 1914 to 1915, he managed the Maxwell automobile racing team that included Barney Oldfield and Eddie Rickenbacker.

Bruske also worked in the advertising business for many years. During the 1910s, he was at different times the adverting and publicity director for four of Detroit's leading automobile manufacturers, E-M-F Company, Studebaker, Maxwell, and Harroun. In his later years, he handled the advertising accounts for Fisher Body and Firestone/Oldfield Tires.

== Early years ==
Bruske was born in Charlotte, Michigan, and raised in Saginaw, Michigan. He was the son of Rev. August F. Bruske, who served as president of Alma College. Bruske attended Alma College where he was a champion tennis player and an infielder and captain of the baseball team. He graduated from Alma in 1898.

== Newspaper career ==
After graduating from Alma, Bruske held reporting jobs with the Lansing State Republican, the Grand Rapids Herald, The Grand Rapids Press, and the Saginaw Evening News. While in Grand Rapids, he covered the city's Western League baseball team that featured three future inductees into the Baseball Hall of Fame -- Rube Waddell, Sam Crawford, and Jake Beckley.

In 1901, Bruske joined the Detroit Tribune and became the head of its sports department in 1902. He established Michigan's first Sunday sports section while he was with the Tribune. He also established Michigan's first color newspaper supplement with a green sports section at the Tribune. In 1906, Bruske moved to the Detroit Times as the sports editor.

In January 1905, Bruske also became the Detroit correspondent for the Sporting Life, a national weekly founded in 1883 devoted to coverage of the sport of baseball. Bruske's baseball articles were regularly featured in Sporting Life from January 1905 through April 1914.

== Automobile career ==
In May 1910, Bruske left his position as the sporting editor of the Detroit Times to become the publicity agent for the E-M-F Company, which was at the time the fourth largest automobile manufacturer in the United States.

In June 1910, Bruske led a pioneering automobile expedition known as "Under Three Flags." Bruske and a small crew drove a Flanders "20" roadster (an early offering by E-M-F Company) from Quebec City to Mexico City in 58 days from June 6 to August 3, 1910. The E-M-F Company subsequently published a book about the expedition, likely written by Bruske. Alfred Henry Spink, the founder of The Sporting News, called Bruske's "Under Three Flags" expedition "the most remarkable journey ever placed to the credit of a car of its power."

In October 1911, Bruske participated in the Glidden Tour, a cross-country automobile race from New York to California.

By 1912, the E-M-F Company had combined with Studebaker, and Bruske was in charge of advertising and publicity for Studebaker. He toured the country arranging exhibitions, overseeing the company's participation in road races, and writing newspaper stories promoting Studebaker automobiles.

In December 1914, he left Studebaker to manage the Maxwell automobile racing team. The Maxwell team was one of the leading automobile racing teams in the 1910s and included among its stars, Barney Oldfield, Ray Harroun (winner of the 1911 Indianapolis 500), Eddie Rickenbacker, and Billy Carlson. In April 1915, after equipping the team's cars with Master carburetors, the Maxwell team took first and second place in a race in Venice, California. In July 1915, the Maxwell team, with Rickenbacker driving, won the 300-mile Sioux City sweepstakes.

In August 1915, the Maxwell automobile company withdrew from the automobile racing business, and Bruske was given a position overseeing the company's newspaper work.

From 1917 to 1919, he was the advertising manager for Ray Harroun's Harroun Motors Corp. In a draft registration card completed at the time of World War I, Bruske described himself as an "advertising writer" for the Harroun Motors Corp. He was living at that time with his wife, Mary Plum Bruske, at 195 Pallister Street in Detroit.

== Family and later years ==
After two years with Harroun, Bruske joined Power, Alexander & Jenkins Co., an advertising agency in 1919. Bruske remained active in the advertising business in his later years, with clients that included Fisher Body and Firestone/Oldfield Tires.

Bruske married a fellow Alma student, Mary Wheeler Plum. They had a son, Paul Wheeler Bruske and a daughter Barbara Plum Bruske. At the time of the 1930 United States census, Bruske was living with his wife and son at 831 Pallister Street in Detroit.

Bruske died in 1956 at Romeo, Michigan.

== Selected works by Bruske ==
- Detroit Doings: Manager Armour and Secretary Navin Working Out Their Spring Plans (Bruske's first column in Sporting Life), Sporting Life, January 14, 1905, page 2
- Detroit Doings: Splendid Season's Work of the Detroit Tigers (overview of 1905 Detroit Tigers season), Sporting Life, October 21, 1905, page 11
- [ Detroit Dope: The American Champions Still in Local Favor; Their Defeat in the World's Series Condoned by Reason of Handicapping Conditions; The Future Regarded With Equanimity] (1907 World Series), Sporting Life, October 26, 1907, page 9
- Detroit Dots: One of the Younger Set Pays His Tribute; The Value of a "Sporting Life" Connection To a Writer Cited; The Latest News of the Detroit Club and Players (Bruske's tribute to the Sporting Life on its 25th anniversary), Sporting Life, March 14, 1908, page 22
- Detroit Doing: Best Season Yet Enjoyed by a Detroit Club; Some Pertinent and Just Comment on the Work of the Tigers in the World's Series; Jennings' Management Not at Fault (1908 World Series), Sporting Life, October 31, 1908, page 8
- Detroit Dots: Navin a New 'Napoleon of Base Ball'; The President of the Detroit Club a Man Henceforth Always to Be Reckoned With by the Leaders; Spring Plans of the Club (Frank Navin), Sporting Life, January 2, 1909, page 7
- A First-Water Fan (crewmen aboard a Great Lakes ore carrier await results of 1908 American League Pennant), Baseball Magazine, May 1909, pages 62–64
- Detroit Delighted: With the Wonderful Achievement of the Tigers in Making a Clean Sweep of the Eastern Rivals Series That Will Live Long in Memory; Sensational Incidents of the Run; Deserved Tribute to Cobb (Ty Cobb), Sporting Life, September 11, 1909, page 5
- Detroit's Joy: Tiger Followers Encouraged by Victory; Fine Pitching of Bill Donovan Is Source of Much Pleasure to the American Leaguers; Praise for Pittsburgh Fine Sportsmanship (1909 World Series), Sporting Life, October 16, 1909, page 6
- Baseball Magnets! Detroit Club Singularly Fortunate in Possessing in Hugh Jennings, Manager, and Ty Cobb, Star Player, Two Exponents of the Game Whose Personality Adds Enormously to Club and Team Success (Ty Cobb/Hughie Jennings), Sporting Life, June 15, 1912, page 1
- The Player's Obligation: Only One Basis for Fraternity Success; Player Organization Must Protect the Employer As Well As the Employe, Else Neither Magnates or Public Will Sanction It, Sporting Life, November 22, 1913, page 13
- Detroit Duly Delighted: With Good Reports About the Tigers; The Team More Harmonious and Ambitious Than Heretofore; Recruits Who Have Given Indication of Real Major Form (Bruske's final column for Sporting Life), Sporting Life, April 11, 1914, page 8
