= Dolson =

Defunct American motor vehicle manufacturer

Dolson Automobile Company
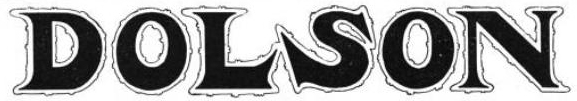
- Company type: Automobile Manufacturing
- Industry: Automotive
- Genre: Touring cars
- Founded: 1904
- Founder: J.L. Dolson
- Defunct: 1907
- Headquarters: Charlotte, Michigan, United States
- Area served: United States
- Products: Vehicles; Automotive parts

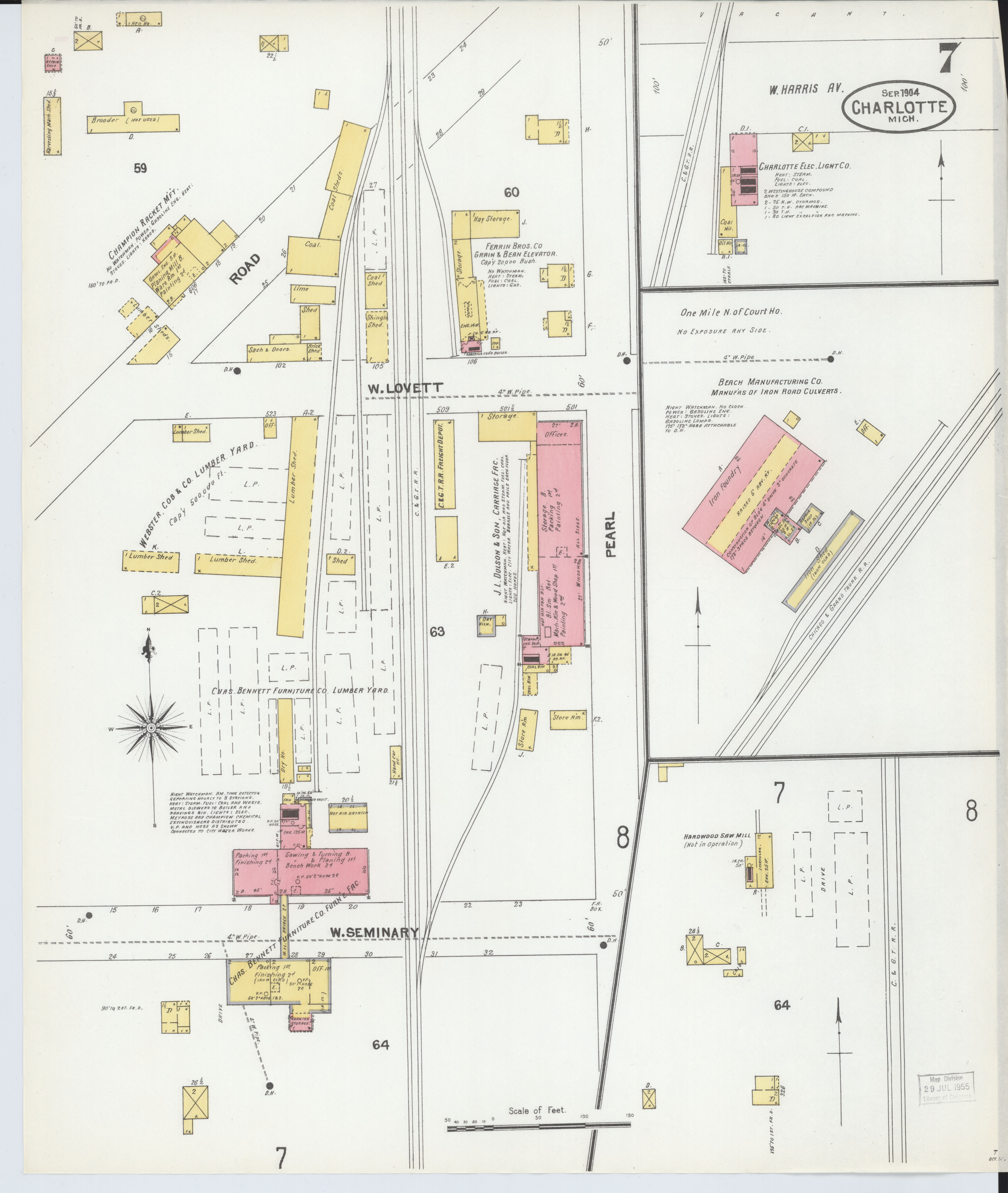
Dolson plant (1904)

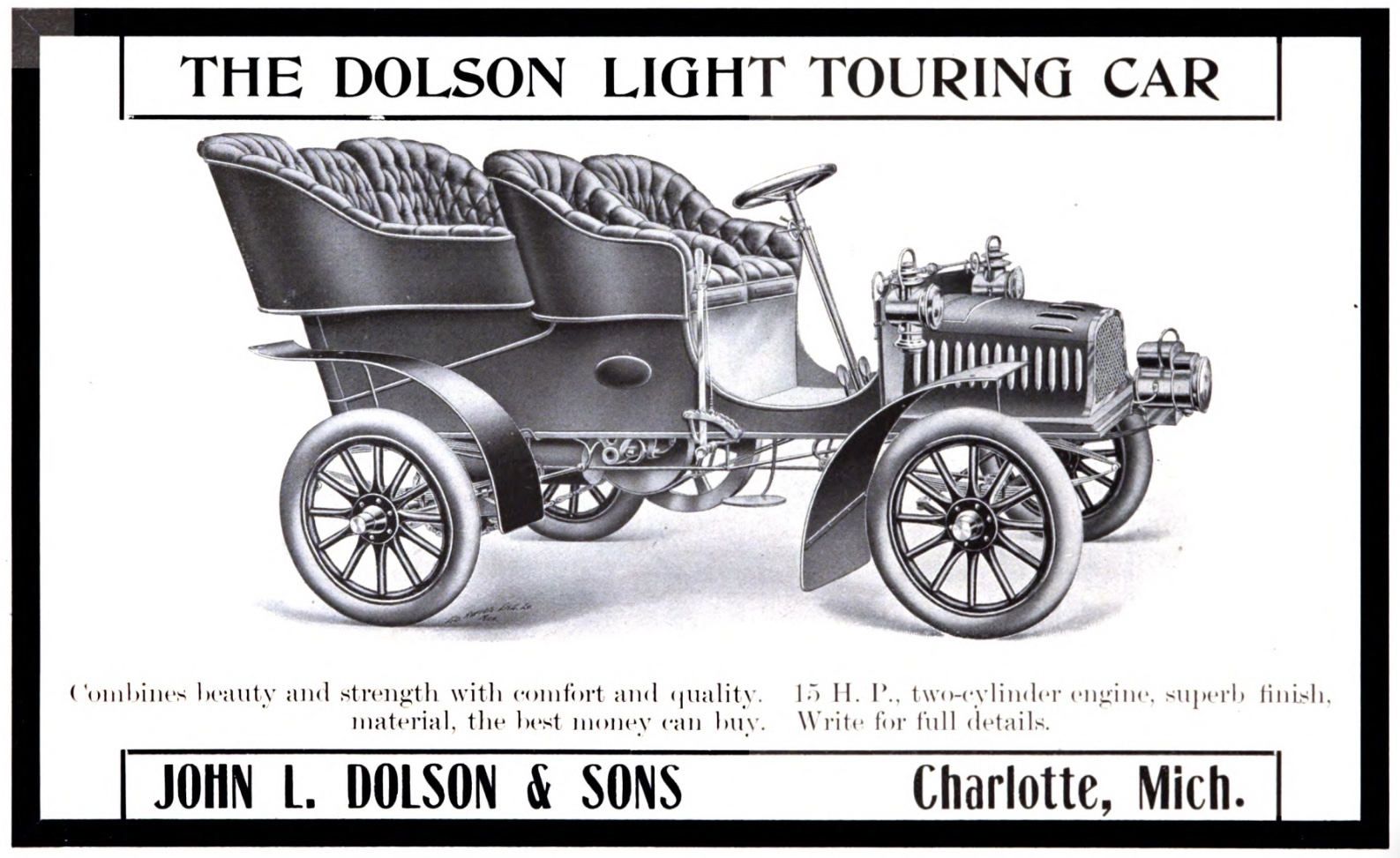
Dolson A-1 (1904)

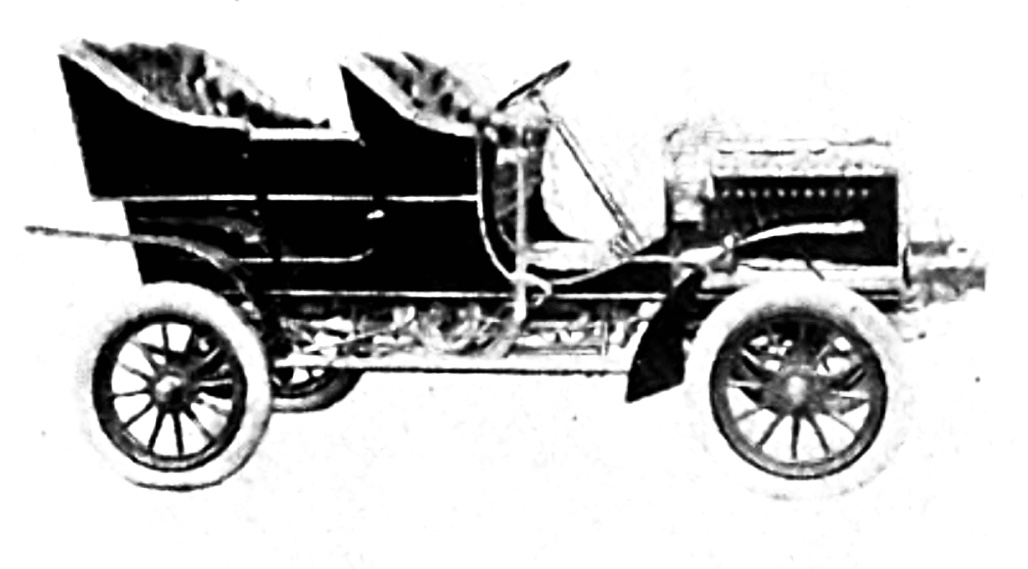
Dolson Model C (1905)

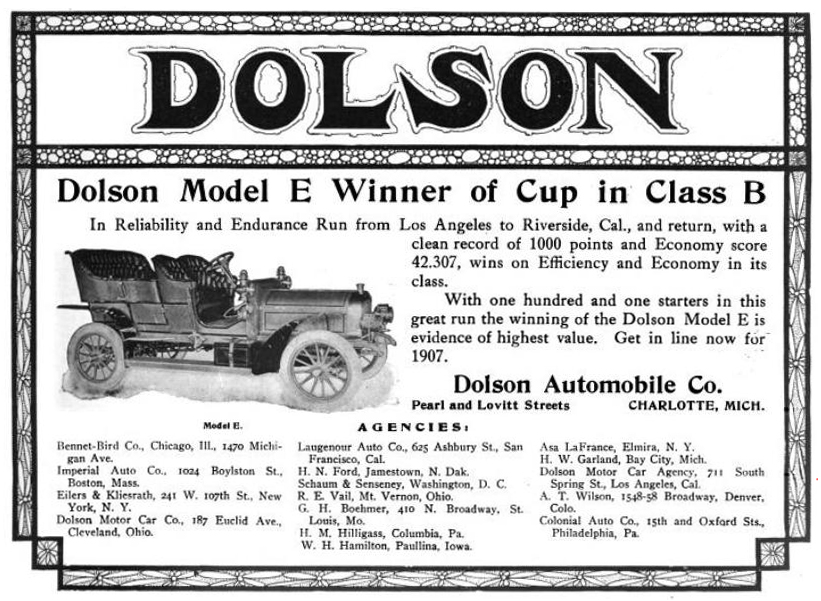
Dolson Automobile Company of Charlotte, Michigan - 1906

The Dolson was a brass era automobile manufactured in Charlotte, Michigan by the J.L. Dolson & Sons from 1904 to 1907. They later changed the company name to the Dolson Automobile Company. The Dolson was a large car with a 60-horsepower engine. They offered a touring car boasting seven seats that sold for $3,250 in 1907. It was advertised as the "Mile-a-Minute" car. They also offered smaller vehicles, with chain and shaft-driven 20 hp flat-twins, and a shaft driven four of 28/30-horsepower.

== History ==
The Dolson family were successful wagon builders in the late 19th century. The company was located in Charlotte, about 15 miles southwest of Lansing, Michigan. In 1902 the company built their first automobile, a 5-passenger touring car, equipped with a two-cylinder water cooled engine, which had 15 horsepower and cost US$1,450. Dolson began producing automobiles in 1904, beginning with four-cylinder touring models. The automobile was regarded for its use of galvanized steel copper sheet panel bodywork. Production increased in 1905 when the carriage business began to phase out. By 1906, Dolson was producing four different models of automobile. In 1907, Dolson produced the Model F Roadster, called the "Cannon Ball". The Cannon Ball had a four-cylinder engine that produced 60 horsepower, advertisements claimed the vehicle could go 75 miles per hour (120 km/h). The company ran out of capital soon after it acquired the St. Anne Kerosine Motor Company, and liquidated in 1908.

In 2012, a Charlotte resident and a few investors purchased a 1907 Dolson from an auction in Plymouth, with a goal of returning a Dolson to the city of Charlotte. Some residents of the town gathered and cheered as the man and his father filled the automobile with gasoline, cranked it and took it for a short spin, with local media coverage.

== Overview of production figures ==
Year	Model	cylinder	Engine displacement	HP
1904	Model A-1	2	2606 cc	15
1905	Model B-1	4	? cc	32
1905	Model C-1	2	? cc	20
1906	Model C	2	3218 cc	24
1906	Model D	2	3218 cc	24
1906	Model E	4	4952 cc	32
1906	Model F	4	6435 cc	50
1907-1908	Model H	4	5473 cc	40
1907-1908	Model F-2 Cannon Ball	4	6435 cc	60
