= Courthouse Square Museum =

- Eaton County Courthouse
- U.S. National Register of Historic Places
- U.S. Historic district – Contributing property
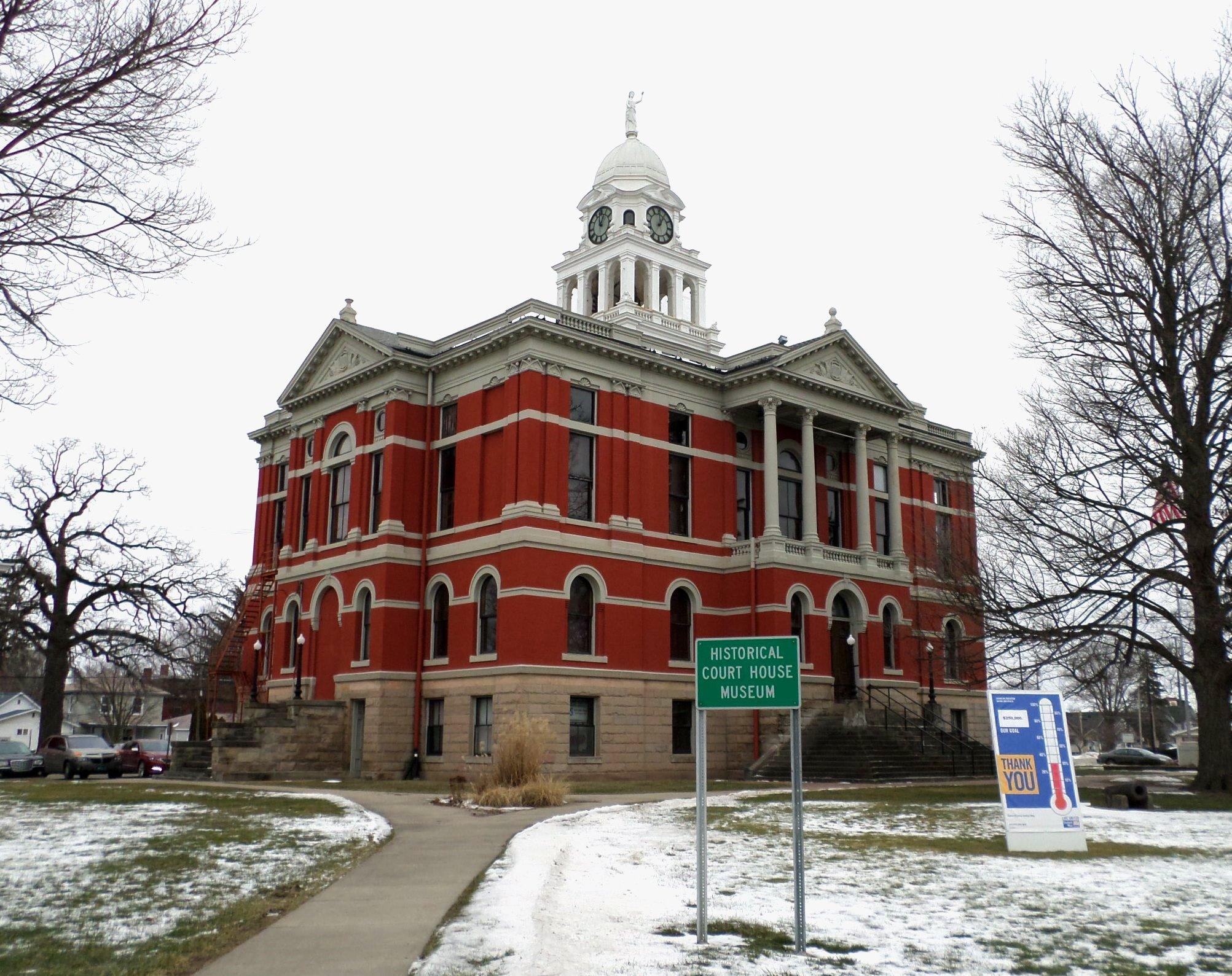

- Location within Michigan Location within the United States
- Interactive map showing the location for Courthouse Square Museum
- Location: W. Lawrence Ave. at Cochran and Bostwick Sts., Charlotte, Michigan
- Coordinates: 42°33′52″N 84°50′12″W
- Area: less than one acre
- Built: 1883
- Built by: Gibbs & Co.
- Architect: Miles, Cramer & Horn
- Part of: Charlotte Central Historic District (ID100002684)
- NRHP reference No.: 71000389
- Added to NRHP: April 2, 1971

The Courthouse Square Museum is a former government building, and current historical museum, located at 100 West Lawrence Avenue in Charlotte, Michigan. It was listed on the National Register of Historic Places in 1971.

== History ==
Eaton County was organized in 1837. The county seat was originally at Bellevue, Michigan but in 1840 was moved to Charlotte. County offices were temporarily housed in the Eagle Hotel in Bellevue until 1845, when the first courthouse, a small frame structure, was constructed. By 1880, growth in the county had outstripped the capacity of the courthouse, and in 1882 the county decided to construct a new building. The committee in charge hired architects Miles, Cramer & Horn of Toledo, Ohio to design a new building, and contractors, also of Toledo, to construct it. The cornerstone was laid in 1883, and the building was completed in 1885.

In 1895, a fire gutted much of the inside of the building, and the interior was reconstructed. The building was used by the county government until 1976 when a new county complex located one mile north of downtown Charlotte was constructed. Restoration of the courthouse began in the 1980s, and in 1993, the Courthouse Square Association took over the maintenance and care of the building and surrounding grounds. The upper two floors of the 1885 Courthouse are a public museum and rental venue. The ground floor contains office and retail spaces.

== Description ==
The old Eaton County Courthouse is a three-story structure with a hip roof, with the first floor faced in rough fieldstone and the upper floors in red brick with stone accents. The entrances are approached via stairways to the second level. Entryways and windows on the second floor are in round-headed openings, while the windows on the third floor are in square-headed openings, save the windows in the center bay of each facade. Pavilions projects on the third level from each side of the building, with pediments and entablatures above-containing carving. In the center of the roof is a three-stage cupola with a square base, columned open belfry, and octagonal dome. A statue of justice tops the dome.
