= Charlotte station (Michigan Central Railroad) =

Former railroad depot in Michigan, US

Charlotte
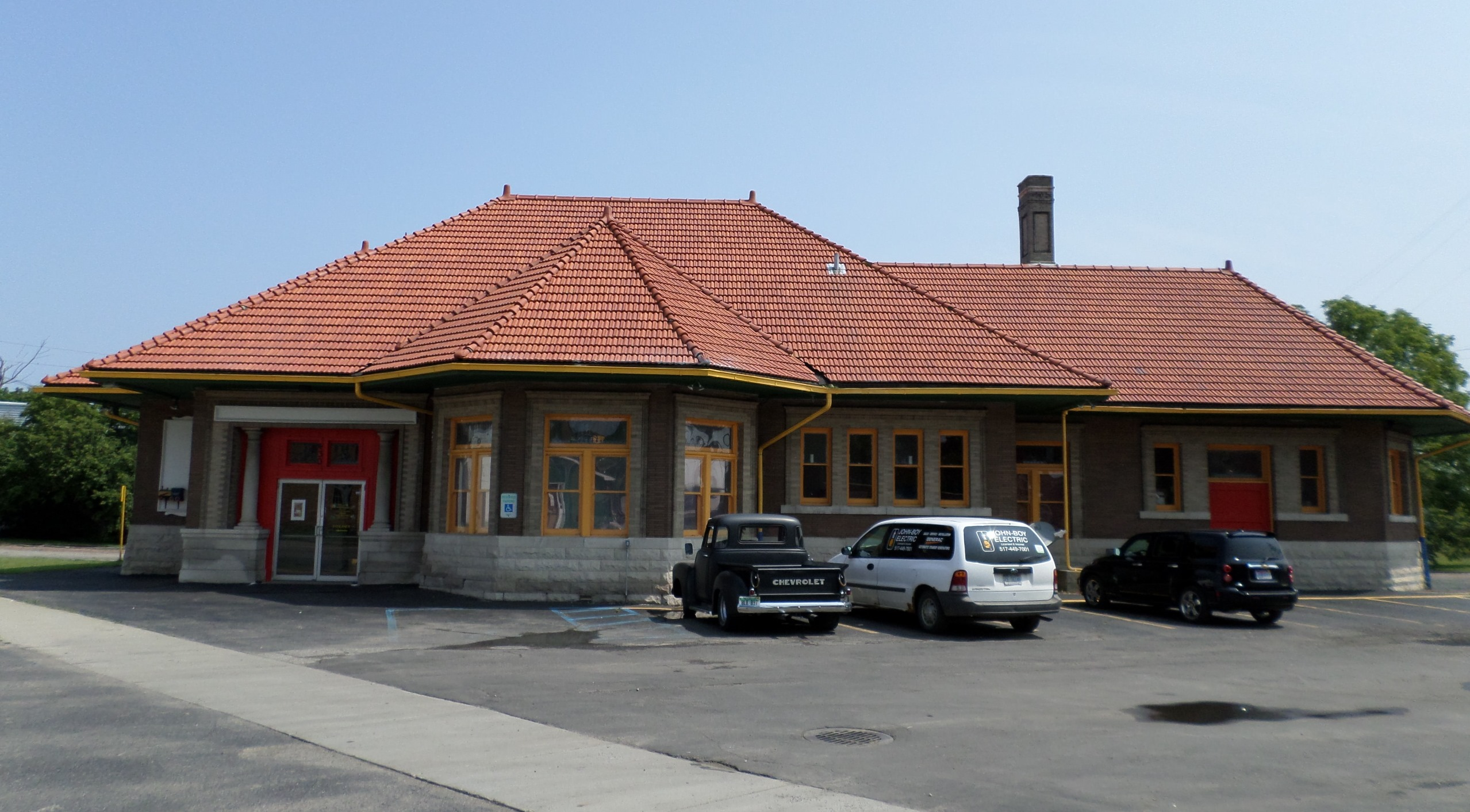

General information
- Location: 430 North Cochran Avenue, Charlotte, Eaton County, Michigan 48813

Former services
Preceding station	New York Central Railroad	Following station
Hastings toward Chicago	Michigan Central Railroad Main Line	Eaton Rapids toward Buffalo
- Michigan Central Railroad Charlotte Depot
- U.S. National Register of Historic Places
- U.S. Historic district – Contributing property
- Location within Michigan
- Location: 430 N Cochran Ave., Charlotte, Michigan
- Coordinates: 42°34′07″N 84°50′09″W
- Area: less than one acre
- Built: 1901
- Built by: N.J. Rogers
- Architect: Spier & Rohns
- Architectural style: Late Victorian
- Part of: Charlotte Central Historic District (ID100002684)
- NRHP reference No.: 00000218
- Added to NRHP: March 15, 2000
Location

Charlotte station is a former railroad depot located at 430 North Cochran Avenue in Charlotte, Michigan. It was listed on the National Register of Historic Places in 2000 as Michigan Central Railroad Charlotte Depot. It has been refurbished as a restaurant, and now houses Don Tequilla's Mexican Grill.

== History ==
Charlotte was first incorporated as a village in 1863, and in 1868 the Grand River Valley Railroad (GRVRR) constructed the first railroad line through the village. The railroad constructed the first depot in Charlotte that same year. In 1870, the GRVRR was folded in to the larger Michigan Central Railroad. Also in 1870, the Peninsular Railway constructed a second line through the village with its own depot. By 1880, Peninsular was part of the Chicago and Grand Trunk Railway.

By the early 20th century, the Michigan Central decided to replace the 1868 GRVRR depot. Although the reason for the replacement is not known, it is likely that the older depot was too small to handle the required volume of passengers and freight passing through the station. Michigan Central tasked the Detroit architectural firm of Spier & Rohns, who designed nearly all the company's depots between 1884 and 1913, to design a new depot in Charlotte in 1901. N.J. Rogers of Detroit was the contractor for the construction, and the new depot opened to passengers in July 1902. For a time, the 1868 depot was retained to handle freight, allowing the new depot to cater exclusively to passengers. The depot served passengers until it closed in about 1948.

After its closure, the Miller family of Eaton Rapids purchased the building and refurbished it into a restaurant and ice cream parlor. The building continued to be used as a restaurant under several owners. It now houses Don Tequilla's Mexican Grill.

== Description ==
The former Michigan Central Railroad Charlotte Depot is a long single-story building constructed of light reddish-brown brick with stone trim, with multiple hipped roofs. It is basically rectangular, measuring 108 feet by 26 feet, with the addition of a large rectangular bay on the street side and an apsidal extension at one end. The roof is covered with clay tile, and has widely extending eaves.

The interior of the building originally contained a main waiting area, a ladies' waiting area, and a baggage room. When refurbished into a restaurant, the floor plan was maintained, with the main waiting area and ladies' waiting area serving as the dining room, while the baggage area and a portion of the main waiting area serving as the kitchen. The ticket counter serves as the cash register area.
