= Harroun =

Defunct American motor vehicle manufacturer

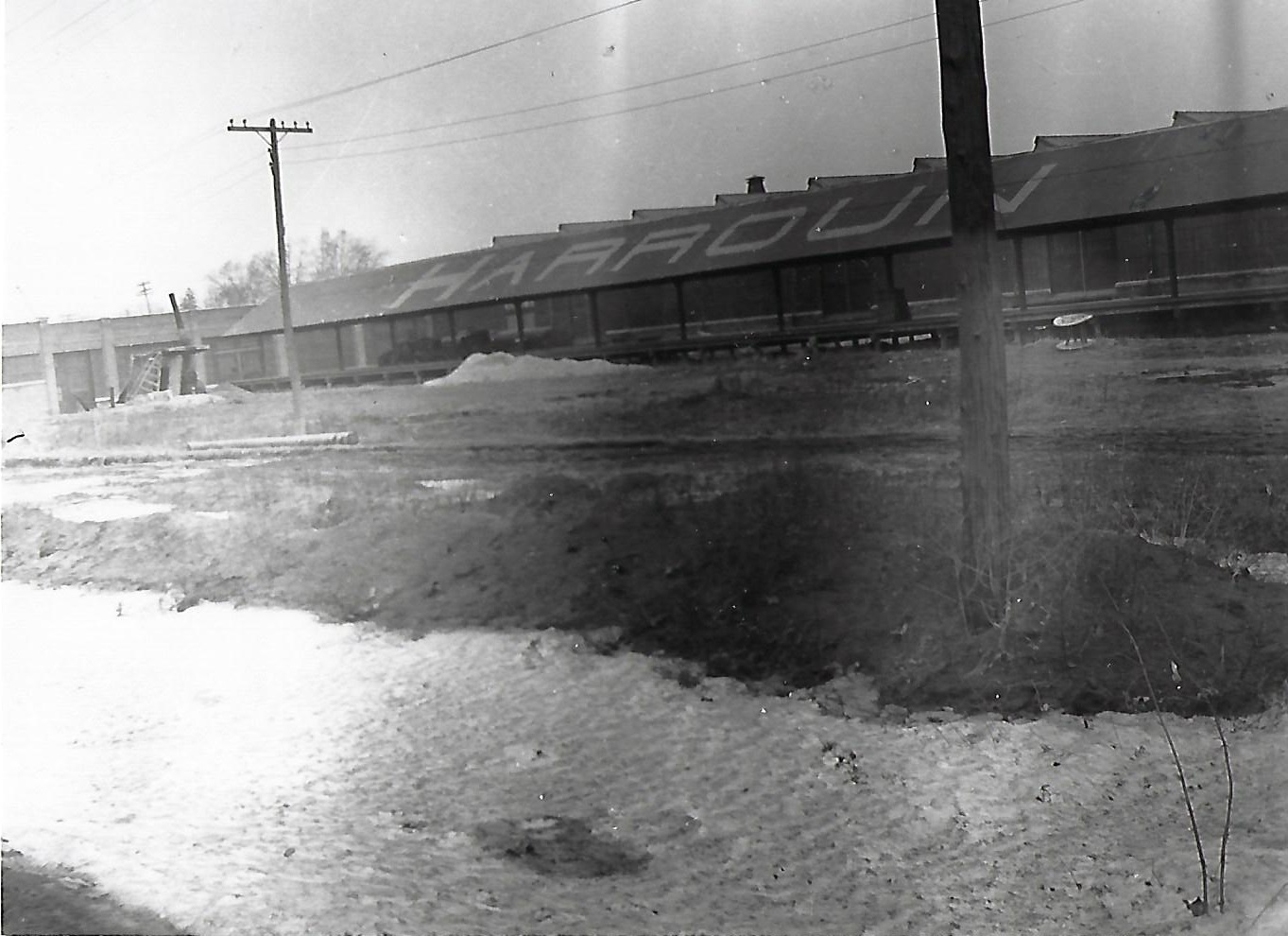
Harroun factory roof

The Harroun was an American automobile manufactured in Wayne, Michigan, by the Harroun Motor Sales Corporation from 1916 to 1920. The company was named after its founder, Ray Harroun.

== Harroun Motor Sales Corporation ==
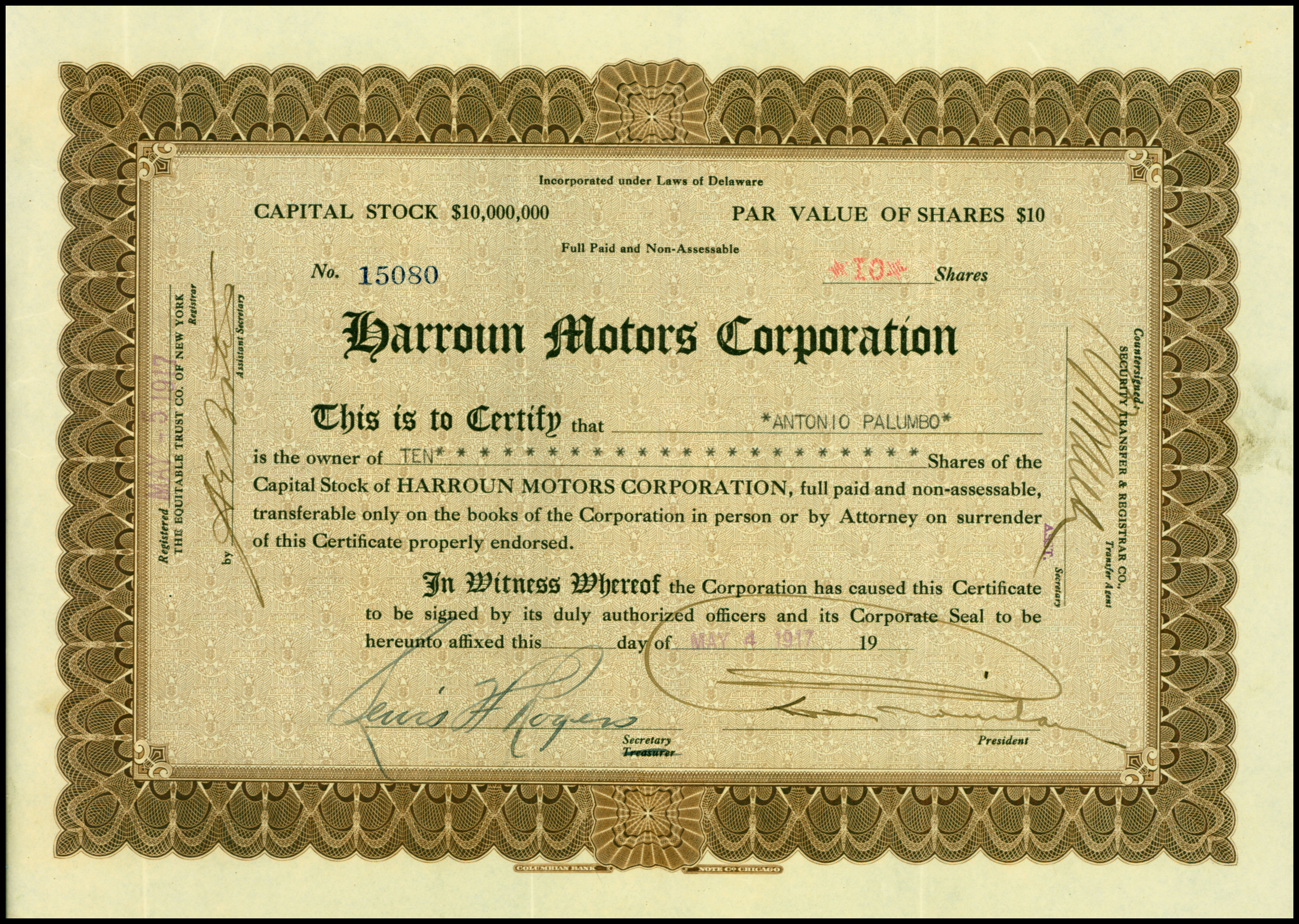
Share of the Harroun Motors Corporation, issued 4 May 1917

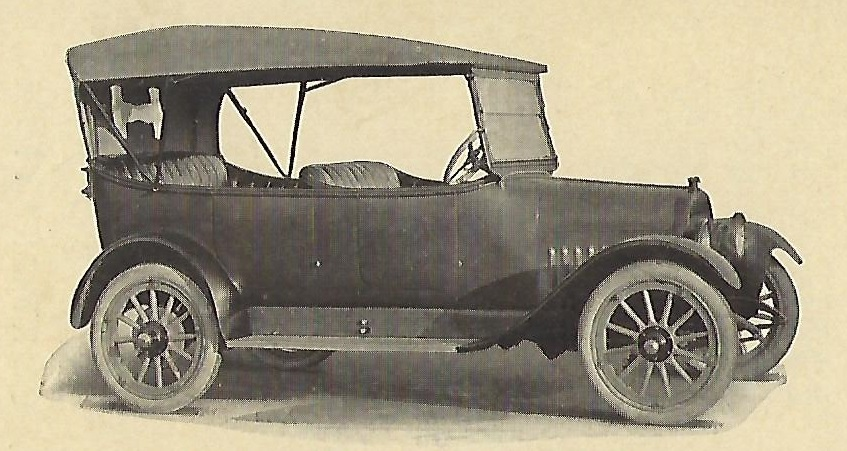
Harroun touring car

The Harroun Motors Corporation raised $10,000,000 in stock to begin a car company. Harroun bought the buildings and equipment of the former Prouty and Glass Carriage Company in 1916 for $40,000. The old carriage factory was 80,000 square feet and used for paint and upholstery, and in 1917, Harroun built a new 1,220,000 square foot factory next door for other processes.

The company operated for 12–18 months producing 200 cars per day. There were three models offered: a roadster, a touring car priced at $595 and a sedan priced at $850, each powered by the company's four-cylinder engine. The cars were only available with a green body, brown roof, black fenders and black upholstery. The roadster was only available in midnight blue. The goal was to get the price of cars below $500 to remain profitable. In 1918, Harroun invented and patented a shock absorbing steering wheel to reduce driver fatigue.

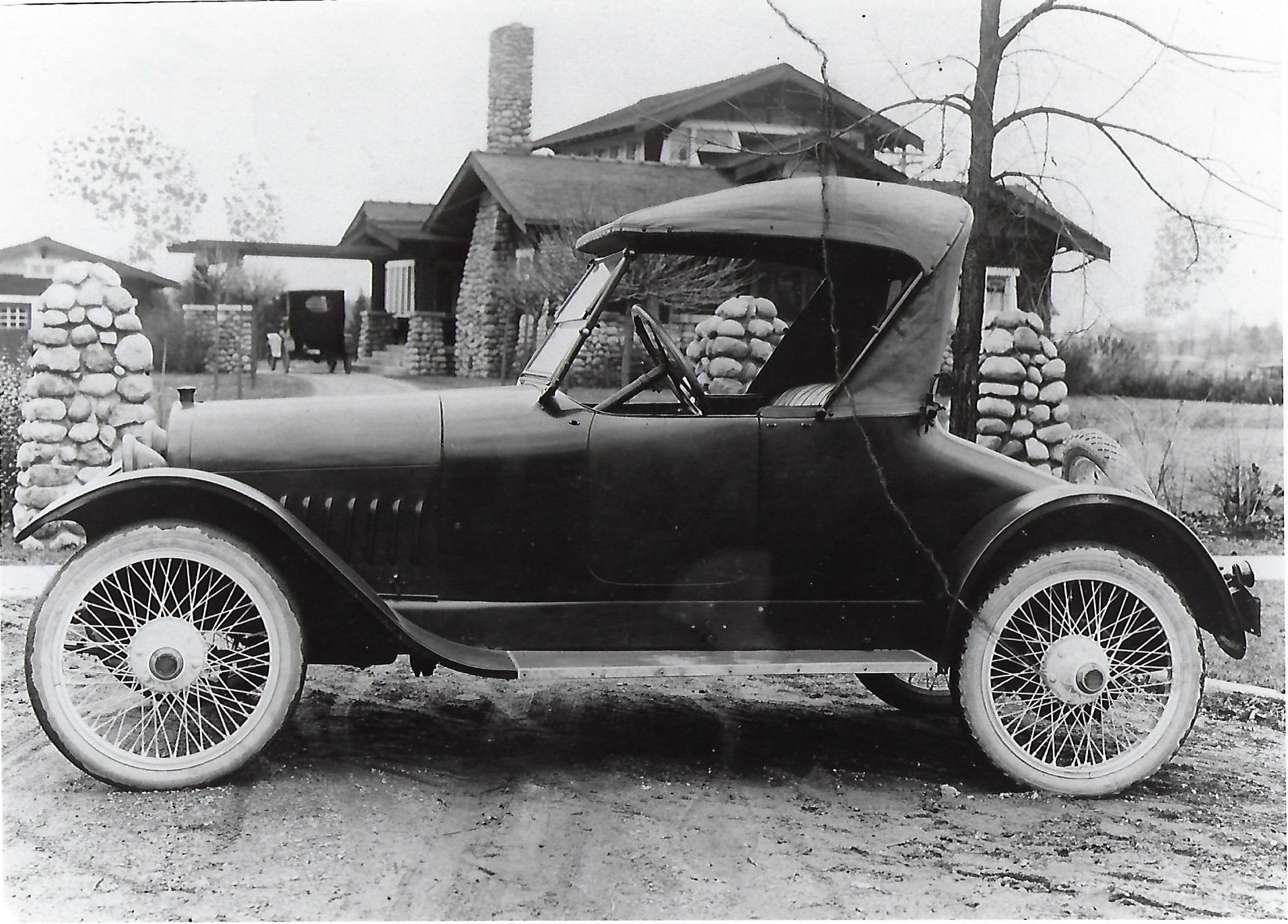
Harroun roadster

== World War I ==
In the spring of 1918, the company got a government contract to produce 200,000 artillery shells during World War I. The plan was to produce cars and artillery shells together in the factory, but the government sent an arbitrary order limiting the factory to only 25 cars per day. Harroun produced 23,899 155 mm howitzer high-explosive, Mark I, Type B shells for the war. The shells weighed 93 pounds and were stamped with the letter "R", the only marking to indicate the maker. Shells were loaded onto the Detroit United Railway streetcar that ran through Wayne and whisked to Detroit, where they were filled and capped.

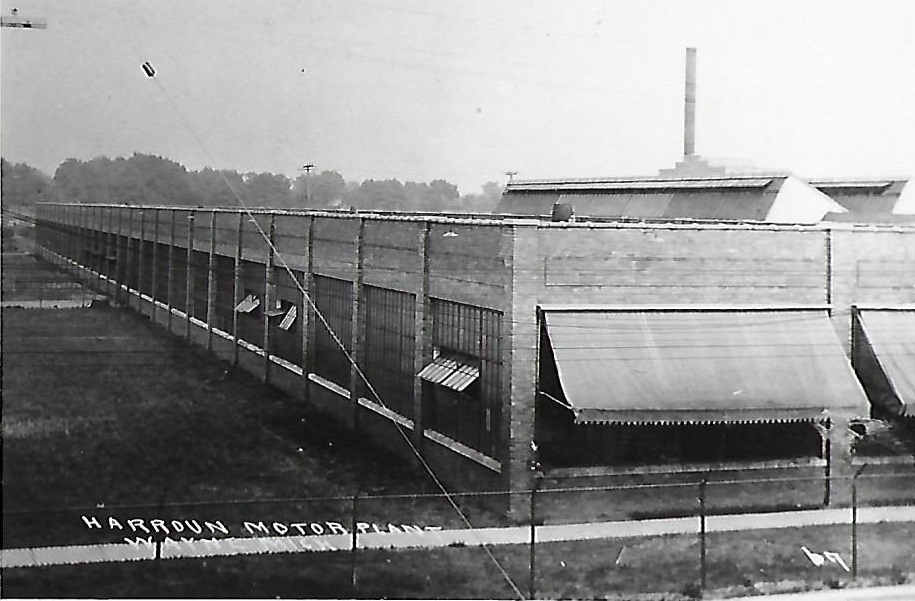
Harroun Motors Plant in Wayne, Michigan

== Closure ==
After the war, the company tried to get started again, creating a new model for 1920. Representatives took the car on a tour from Detroit to Montana and on to Denver to prove its reliability. The company was still closed in 1920. Fewer than 3,000 cars were built and two are known to survive. In 1923, the company's assets were sold off, and the factory was bought by the Gotfredson Truck Company in 1924.

A 1919 Harroun Model A-1 was sold at auction in September 2019 for $33,000.

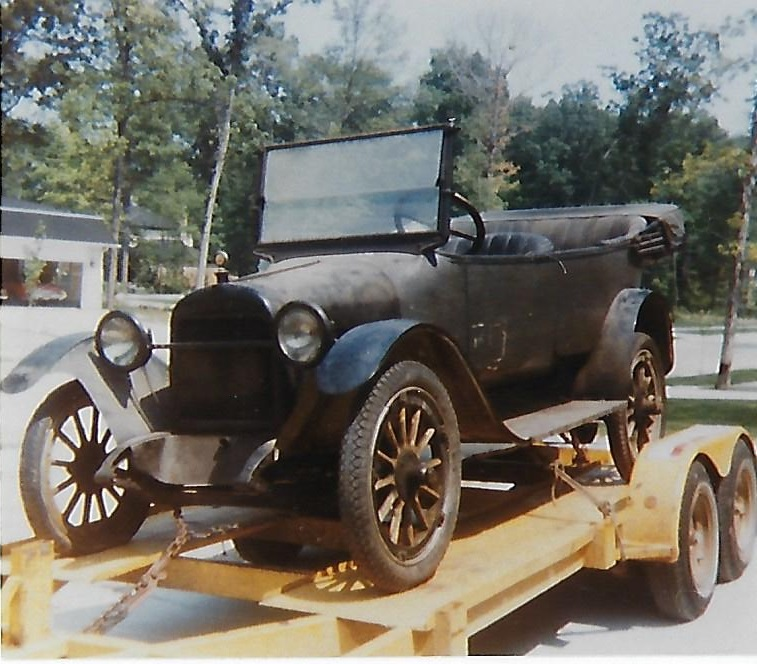
A Harroun on a trailer, current location unknown

Ray Harroun
