= Charlotte, Michigan =

Charlotte
- City
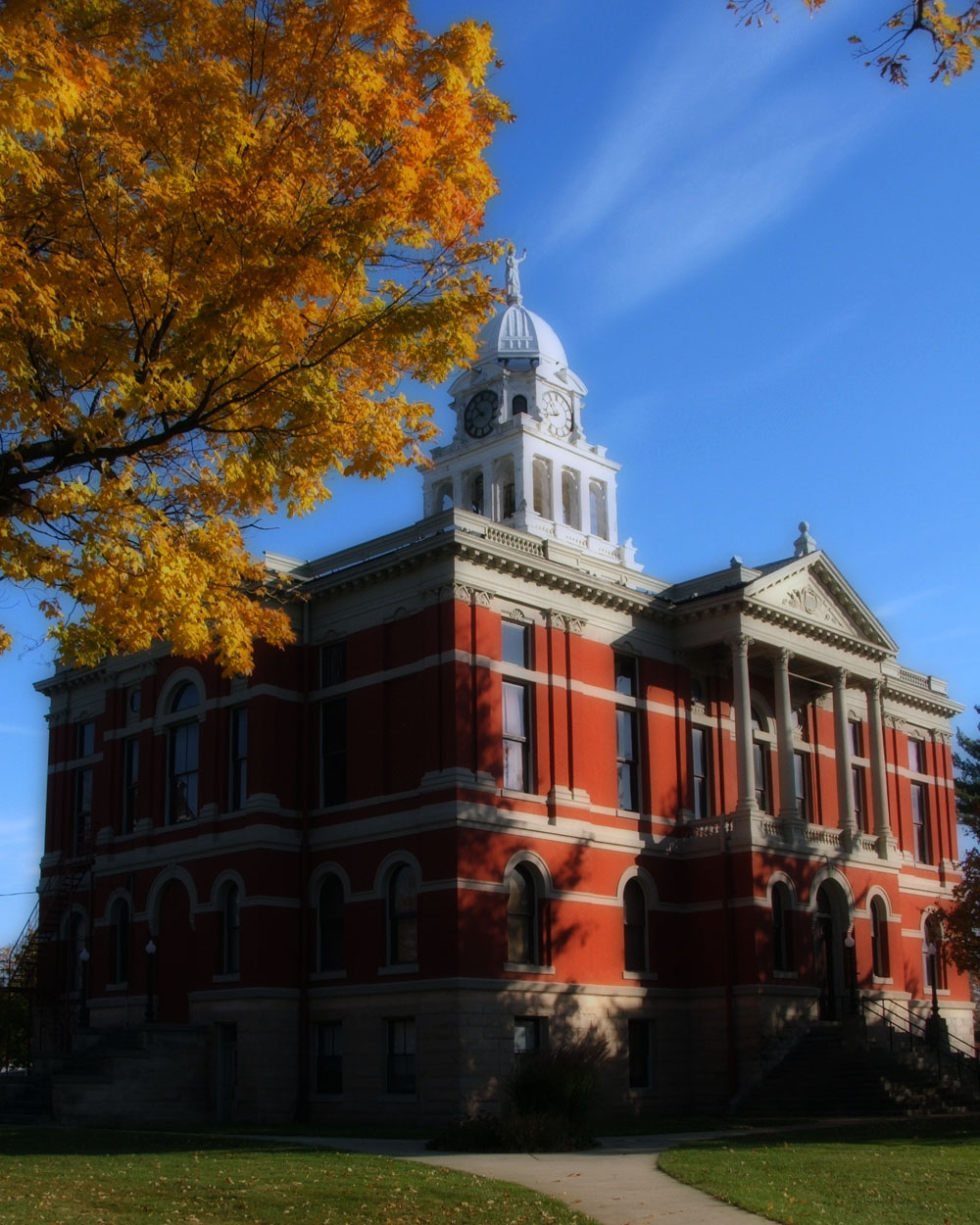
- Courthouse Square Museum, former Eaton County Courthouse
- Nickname: Maple City
- Location of Charlotte, Michigan
- Coordinates: 42°33′59″N 84°49′49″W
- Country: United States
- State: Michigan
- County: Eaton
- Founder: Edmond B. Bostwick
- Named for: Mr. Bostwick's wife Charlotte Lovett Bostwick

Government
  - Type: Mayor-Council
  - Mayor: Tim Lewis
  - Mayor Pro Tem: Michael Duwek

Area
  - Total: 6.50 sq mi (16.83 km^{2})
  - Land: 6.45 sq mi (16.71 km^{2})
  - Water: 0.046 sq mi (0.12 km^{2})
- Elevation: 912 ft (278 m)

Population (2020)
  - Total: 9,299
  - Density: 1,441.5/sq mi (556.57/km^{2})
- Time zone: UTC-5 (Eastern (EST))
  - Summer (DST): UTC-4 (EDT)
- ZIP code: 48813
- Area code: 517
- FIPS code: 26-14820
- GNIS feature ID: 1626062
- Website: https://www.charlottemi.gov/

Charlotte (/ʃɑːrˈlɒt/ shar-LOT) is a city in and the county seat of Eaton County, Michigan. As of the 2020 census, the city population was 9,299.

Charlotte is in the central portion of the county on the boundary between Eaton Township and Carmel Township but is politically independent of both. Interstate 69 serves the city and connects it to the state capital of Lansing. It is located 21 miles (34 km) from downtown Lansing.

== History ==
In 1832, George William Barnes purchased the land that would become Charlotte from the U.S. government. Barnes in turn sold the land to Edmond B. Bostwick, a land speculator from New York City three years later in 1835. Bostwick then sold portions of the land to H.I. Lawrence, Townsend Harris, and Francis Cochran. The four created the village which they named after Edmond Bostwick's wife, Charlotte, who originally wanted it to be called Charlotteville. Jonathan Searles became the first postmaster on March 17, 1838.

Charlotte was incorporated as a village on October 10, 1863, and as a city on March 29, 1871. At various times, Charlotte had the unofficial names of Eaton Centre, and Carmel. It was designated as the county seat when Eaton County was organized in 1837; however, due to a lack of population and buildings, county functions were conducted at Bellevue until 1840.

The Dolson automobile was manufactured in Charlotte from 1904 to 1907.

== Geography ==
According to the United States Census Bureau, the city has a total area of 6.50 square miles (16.83 km^{2}), of which 6.45 square miles (16.71 km^{2}) is land and 0.05 square miles (0.13 km^{2}) is water.

Charlotte is situated on gently rolling prairie. The Battle Creek River has its northern bend in the south part of the city, entering from the southeast and exiting to the southwest. The northern part of the city is part of the Thornapple River watershed.

== Demographics ==
Historical population
Census	Pop.	Note	%±
1870	2,253		—
1880	2,910		29.2%
1890	3,867		32.9%
1900	4,092		5.8%
1910	4,886		19.4%
1920	5,126		4.9%
1930	5,307		3.5%
1940	5,544		4.5%
1950	6,606		19.2%
1960	7,657		15.9%
1970	8,244		7.7%
1980	8,251		0.1%
1990	8,083		−2.0%
2000	8,389		3.8%
2010	9,074		8.2%
2020	9,299		2.5%
U.S. Decennial Census

=== 2020 census ===
As of the 2020 census, Charlotte had a population of 9,299. The median age was 38.7 years. 22.5% of residents were under the age of 18 and 18.4% of residents were 65 years of age or older. For every 100 females there were 96.6 males, and for every 100 females age 18 and over there were 92.0 males age 18 and over.

98.4% of residents lived in urban areas, while 1.6% lived in rural areas.

There were 3,801 households in Charlotte, of which 28.3% had children under the age of 18 living in them. Of all households, 36.9% were married-couple households, 21.0% were households with a male householder and no spouse or partner present, and 33.5% were households with a female householder and no spouse or partner present. About 34.7% of all households were made up of individuals and 15.7% had someone living alone who was 65 years of age or older.

There were 4,066 housing units, of which 6.5% were vacant. The homeowner vacancy rate was 2.3% and the rental vacancy rate was 4.0%.

Racial composition as of the 2020 census
Race	Number	Percent
White	8,337	89.7%
Black or African American	161	1.7%
American Indian and Alaska Native	40	0.4%
Asian	55	0.6%
Native Hawaiian and Other Pacific Islander	2	0.0%
Some other race	138	1.5%
Two or more races	566	6.1%
Hispanic or Latino (of any race)	532	5.7%

=== 2010 census ===
As of the census of 2010, there were 9,074 people, 3,661 households, and 2,291 families residing in the city. The population density was 1,406.8 inhabitants per square mile (543.2/km^{2}). There were 3,997 housing units at an average density of 619.7 per square mile (239.3/km^{2}). The racial makeup of the city was 95.1% White.

There were 3,661 households, of which 34.1% had children under the age of 18 living with them, 41.8% were married couples living together, 15.4% had a female householder with no husband present, 5.3% had a male householder with no wife present, and 37.4% were non-families. 32.0% of all households were made up of individuals, and 12.2% had someone living alone who was 65 years of age or older. The average household size was 2.38 and the average family size was 2.97.

The median age in the city was 35.8 years. 26% of residents were under the age of 18; 8.8% were between the ages of 18 and 24; 27.5% were from 25 to 44; 23.6% were from 45 to 64; and 14% were 65 years of age or older. The gender makeup of the city was 48.3% male and 51.7% female.

=== 2000 census ===
As of the census of 2000, there were 8,389 people, 3,249 households, and 2,124 families residing in the city. The population density was 1,403.8 inhabitants per square mile (542.0/km^{2}). There were 3,417 housing units at an average density of 571.8 per square mile (220.8/km^{2}). The racial makeup of the city was 95.79% White, 0.94% African American, 0.55% Native American, 0.35% Asian, 1.07% from other races, and 1.30% from two or more races. Hispanic or Latino of any race were 3.46% of the population.

There were 3,249 households, out of which 34.1% had children under the age of 18 living with them, 46.7% were married couples living together, 13.9% had a female householder with no husband present, and 34.6% were non-families. 29.5% of all households were made up of individuals, and 12.1% had someone living alone who was 65 years of age or older. The average household size was 2.45 and the average family size was 3.02.

In the city, the population was spread out, with 26.5% under the age of 18, 10.1% from 18 to 24, 30.5% from 25 to 44, 19.4% from 45 to 64, and 13.6% who were 65 years of age or older. The median age was 34 years. For every 100 females, there were 95.7 males. For every 100 females age 18 and over, there were 91.9 males.

The median income for a household in the city was $37,473, and the median income for a family was $45,759. Males had a median income of $31,573 versus $27,019 for females. The per capita income for the city was $18,066. About 7.8% of families and 10.0% of the population were below the poverty line, including 11.3% of those under age 18 and 11.2% of those age 65 or over.

== Education ==
Charlotte Public Schools operates Galewood Early Elementary for developmental kindergarten and kindergarten students, operates Parkview Elementary School and Washington Elementary School for first through third grade, and operates Charlotte Upper Elementary for fourth grade and fifth grade students. Charlotte Middle School serves seventh and eighth grade students while Charlotte High School serves ninth through twelfth grade students. The district also operates the Weymouth Child Development Center as a childcare facility.

There are two parochial schools in the city. Charlotte Adventist Christian School serves grades 1 through 8 and is owned and operated by the Charlotte Seventh-day Adventist Church and is a part of the Seventh-day Adventist education system. St. Mary Elementary School is run by Saint Mary Catholic Church and serves K-8 students and Preschool.

There is one alternative education school known as the Relevant Academy of Eaton County. In addition, special needs children are served by the Eaton Intermediate School District.

For post-secondary students, Olivet College is 10.4 miles (16.7 km) to the south and Michigan State University is 25.2 miles (40.6 km) to the northeast. The University of Michigan is located 82.1 miles (132.1 km) southeast. Lansing Community College is located 22 miles (35 km) to the northeast, and features cooperative relationships with a number of other universities around the state.

Further education/training can also be obtained at the Southridge Vocational Center.

== Transportation ==
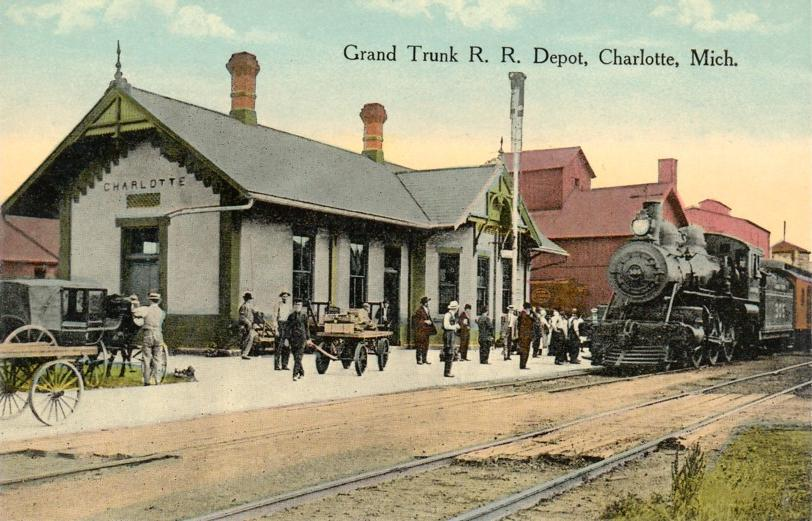
Grand Trunk Depot, Charlotte, Michigan built in 1885.

=== Highways ===
- I-69
- BL I-69
- M-50
- M-79

=== Air ===
- In the northeast corner of the city is the Fitch H. Beach Airport.
- Scheduled passenger carrier flights are available at Capital Region International Airport, near the northeast corner of Eaton County.

=== Rail ===
- Charlotte was once serviced by the Grand Trunk Western Railroad and the Michigan Central Railroad. The original Michigan Central Railroad depot still stands at 430 N. Cochran Ave. and at various times has operated as a restaurant, ice cream parlor, and coffee shop.
- Currently Canadian National Railway and the Charlotte Southern Railroad provide rail service to the city.

== Entertainment ==
The Eaton Theatre, located downtown, also shows movies nightly and features two arcade rooms. The Eaton Theatre opened as a single screen in 1931 and is located downtown. Built during the Art Deco era it was totally modernized when it was twinned. It still has the large square marquee and the vertical sign, however the balcony area was transformed into a separate upstairs room to house a second screen. The Charlotte Performing Arts Center is home to music, vocal, and theatre performances by Charlotte Public Schools students. It is also home to performances by other groups based in and out of Charlotte.

== Economy ==
Spartan Motors, an automobile design company that designs, engineers and manufactures specialty chassis, specialty vehicles, truck bodies and aftermarket parts for the recreational vehicle (RV), emergency response, government services, defense, and delivery and service markets, is based in Charlotte.

== Notable people ==
- Tom Barrett, U.S. representative, former state senator and representative
- Emerson R. Boyles, chief justice of the Michigan Supreme Court (1940–1956)
- A. Whitney Brown, comedian and writer known for Saturday Night Live
- Paul H. Bruske, journalist, advertising executive, and sportsman
- Luren Dickinson, 37th governor of Michigan
- Francis C. Flaherty, WWII Medal of Honor recipient
- Brock Gutierrez, National Football League player
- Frank A. Hooker, justice of the Michigan Supreme Court
- Eric Menk, professional basketball player in Denmark and the Philippines
- Rocco Moore, National Football League player
- Harry T. Morey, stage and film actor
- Cooper Rush, National Football League quarterback with the Atlanta Falcons
- Richard Clyde Taylor, metaphysical philosopher and author
- Wayne Terwilliger, Major League Baseball player and coach
- Micheal Ranville, writer of To Strike at a King

== Climate ==
This climatic region is typified by large seasonal temperature differences, with warm to hot (and often humid) summers and cold (sometimes severely cold) winters. According to the Köppen Climate Classification system, Charlotte has a humid continental climate, abbreviated "Dfb" on climate maps.

Climate data for Charlotte, Michigan (1991–2020 normals, extremes 1902–present)
Month	Jan	Feb	Mar	Apr	May	Jun	Jul	Aug	Sep	Oct	Nov	Dec	Year
Record high °F (°C)	65 (18)	70 (21)	87 (31)	88 (31)	92 (33)	101 (38)	106 (41)	102 (39)	100 (38)	91 (33)	79 (26)	69 (21)	106 (41)
Mean daily maximum °F (°C)	29.8 (−1.2)	32.9 (0.5)	43.3 (6.3)	56.7 (13.7)	68.4 (20.2)	77.5 (25.3)	81.5 (27.5)	79.3 (26.3)	72.9 (22.7)	60.2 (15.7)	46.3 (7.9)	35.1 (1.7)	57.0 (13.9)
Daily mean °F (°C)	22.4 (−5.3)	24.6 (−4.1)	33.7 (0.9)	45.6 (7.6)	57.4 (14.1)	66.8 (19.3)	70.6 (21.4)	68.7 (20.4)	61.6 (16.4)	50.0 (10.0)	38.1 (3.4)	28.5 (−1.9)	47.3 (8.5)
Mean daily minimum °F (°C)	15.1 (−9.4)	16.2 (−8.8)	24.0 (−4.4)	34.6 (1.4)	46.3 (7.9)	56.1 (13.4)	59.8 (15.4)	58.1 (14.5)	50.3 (10.2)	39.7 (4.3)	30.0 (−1.1)	21.8 (−5.7)	37.7 (3.2)
Record low °F (°C)	−26 (−32)	−31 (−35)	−17 (−27)	3 (−16)	18 (−8)	23 (−5)	39 (4)	33 (1)	24 (−4)	14 (−10)	−9 (−23)	−23 (−31)	−31 (−35)
Average precipitation inches (mm)	2.26 (57)	1.69 (43)	2.27 (58)	3.43 (87)	4.03 (102)	3.82 (97)	3.02 (77)	3.56 (90)	3.20 (81)	3.55 (90)	2.74 (70)	2.20 (56)	35.77 (909)
Average snowfall inches (cm)	14.9 (38)	4.4 (11)	5.8 (15)	1.0 (2.5)	0.0 (0.0)	0.0 (0.0)	0.0 (0.0)	0.0 (0.0)	0.0 (0.0)	0.3 (0.76)	2.1 (5.3)	9.6 (24)	38.1 (97)
Average precipitation days (≥ 0.01 in)	15.0	11.7	10.5	13.6	13.5	10.6	9.7	10.5	10.0	13.5	12.5	13.6	144.7
Average snowy days (≥ 0.1 in)	9.2	5.8	3.3	0.6	0.0	0.0	0.0	0.0	0.0	0.1	2.1	7.9	29.0
Source: NOAA
