= Interstate 8 Athletic Conference =

Sports league

- Founded: 2014
- No. of teams: 7 (6 in 2027–28)
- Country: United States

The Interstate 8 Athletic Conference is an athletic conference for high schools in Michigan formed in 2014 with eight schools in south central Michigan. The conference currently consists of seven Class A and B schools from Barry, Branch, Calhoun, and Jackson counties. The name of the conference derives from the I-69 and I-94 corridors.

== History ==
The conference was founded in 2014 with the following charter members: Charlotte, Coldwater, Harper Creek, Jackson Lumen Christi, Jackson Northwest, Marshall, Parma Western, and Pennfield.

After the 2015-16 school year, Charlotte left the conference and eventually rejoin the Capital Area Activities Conference. Hastings from the Ottawa-Kent Conference was selected to replace Charlotte starting in the 2016-17 school year.

In August 2022, it was announced that Lumen Christi, the smallest member and the only private school in the conference would depart the Interstate 8 to join the Catholic High School League beginning in the 2023-24 school year. With Lumen Christi's departure, the remaining seven schools at some point or another participated in the old Twin Valley Conference that existed from 1931 to 2001.

In February 2026, it was announced that Jackson Northwest, the largest member in the conference would depart the Interstate 8 to join the Southeastern Conference (MHSAA) in the 2027-2028 school year.

== Member schools ==
=== Current members ===
School	Nickname	Location	Class	Enrollment (Note: Updated for the 2024-25 school year)	Joined	Previous Conference	Colors
Battle Creek Harper Creek	Beavers	Emmett Township, Calhoun County	A	793	2014	Southwestern Michigan Athletic Conference	
Battle Creek Pennfield	Panthers	Pennfield Township, Calhoun County	B	634	2014	Kalamazoo Valley Association	
Coldwater	Cardinals	Coldwater, Branch County	A	900	2014	Southwestern Michigan Athletic Conference	
Hastings	Saxons	Hastings, Barry County	B	766	2016	Ottawa-Kent Conference	
Jackson Northwest (Note: Jackson Northwest is leaving the Interstate 8 for the Southeastern Conference (SEC) effective the 2027-28 school year.)	Mounties	Blackman Township, Jackson County	A	935	2014	Capital Area Activities Conference	
Marshall	Redhawks	Marshall, Calhoun County	B	782	2014	Southwestern Michigan Athletic Conference	
Parma Western (Note: Also known as Jackson County Western)	Panthers	Spring Arbor Township, Jackson County	B	777	2014	Capital Area Activities Conference	

=== Former members ===
School	Nickname	Location	Joined	Previous Conference	Departed	Successive Conference	Current Conference
Charlotte	Orioles	Charlotte, Eaton County	2014	Capital Area Activities Conference	2016	Independent	Capital Area Activities Conference
Jackson Lumen Christi	Titans	Summit Township, Jackson County	2014	Capital Area Activities Conference	2023	Catholic High School League	

=== Membership Timeline ===
Full members Other Conference

== Champions ==
=== Football ===
Year	Team	Record
2014	Jackson Lumen Christi	7–0
2015	Coldwater	7–0
2016	Harper Creek; Jackson Lumen Christi	6–1
2017	Harper Creek	7–0
2018	Jackson Lumen Christi	7–0
2019	Jackson Lumen Christi	7–0
2020	Hastings	4–1
2021	Harper Creek; Hastings; Jackson Lumen Christi	6–1
2022	Hastings	7–0
2023	Hastings	6–0
2024	Harper Creek	6–0
2025	Harper Creek	6–0
