= Stockbridge Junior / Senior High School =

Stockbridge Junior/Senior High School
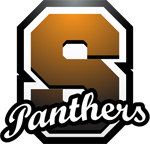

Location
- 416 N Clinton St; Stockbridge, Michigan 49285; United States
- Coordinates: 42°27′24″N 84°10′54″W

Information
- Former name: Stockbridge High School
- Type: Public secondary
- Motto: We Are One
- School district: Stockbridge Community Schools
- Superintendent: Brian Friddle
- High School Principal: Jeff Trapp
- Assistant Principal: Derek Douglas
- Teaching staff: 32.69 (on an FTE basis)
- Grades: 7 to 12
- Enrollment: 525 (2023-2024)
- Student to teacher ratio: 16.06
- Colors: Orange and black
- Athletics conference: Big 8 Conference
- Nickname: Panthers
- Newspaper: Uncaged News
- Feeder schools: Heritage School, Smith Elementary
- Website: www.panthernet.net/our-schools/high-school/

Student assessments
- 2021–22 school year Change vs. prior year

M-STEP 11th grade proficiency rates (Science / Social Studies)
- Advanced %: 13.6 / 9.1
- Proficient %: 17.0 / 29.5
- PR. Proficient %: 17.0 / 52.3
- Not Proficient %: 52.3 / 9.1

Average test scores
- SAT Total: 965.2 (▲ +6.4)

Stockbridge Junior/Senior High School is a public secondary school serving grades 7–12 in Stockbridge, Michigan, United States. It is part of the Stockbridge Community Schools.

== Demographics ==
The demographic breakdown of the 572 students enrolled for the 2015–2016 academic year was:

- Male - 54.0%
- Female - 46.0%
- Black - 1.0%
- Hispanic - 4.9%
- White - 93.7%
- Multiracial - 0.4%

31.3% of the students were eligible for free or reduced-cost lunch.

== Academics ==
Stockbridge was unranked in the 2018 U.S. News & World Report annual ranking.

== Athletics ==
The Stockbridge Panthers compete in MHSAA as a member of the Big 8 Conference. They were in the Greater Lansing Activities Conference from 2015 to 2023. The team colors are orange and black. Prior to 2014, the Panthers were in the Capital Area Activities Conference in the White Division.

The following MHSAA sanctioned sports are offered:

- Baseball (boys)
- Basketball (boys and girls)
- Bowling (boys and girls)
- Competitive cheer (girls)
- Cross country (boys and girls)
  - Boys state champions - 1994, 1995
- Football (boys)
- Golf (boys and girls)
- Soccer (boys and girls)
- Softball (girls)
- Track & field (boys and girls)
- Volleyball (girls)
- Wrestling (boys)

Additionally, Stockbridge offers equestrian teams for boys and girls sanctioned by the Michigan Interscholastic Horsemanship Association (MIHA).

The Leslie High School Blackhawks of Leslie, Michigan are a rival of Stockbridge. In football, the rivalry was first played in 1910 and have met at least once per year ever since. It is said to be one of the oldest rivalries in the state of Michigan. In the mid 1990s, Leslie decided to create a trophy that would go to the winning school. The trophy has a helmet on it.
