= Stockbridge Community Schools =

School district in Michigan, United States

Address
- 100 Price Avenue Ste. A Stockbridge, Ingham County, Michigan, 49285; United States

District information
- Grades: PreKindergarten–12
- Superintendent: Brian Friddle
- Schools: 3
- Budget: $19,850,000 2022-2023 expenditures
- NCES District ID: 2633030

Students and staff
- Students: 1,075 (2024-2025)
- Teachers: 77.49 (on an FTE basis) (2024-2025)
- Staff: 175.42 FTE (2024-2025)
- Student–teacher ratio: 13.87 (2024-2025)

Other information
- Website: www.panthernet.net

Stockbridge Community Schools is a public school district in Michigan. In Ingham County, it serves Stockbridge and parts of the townships of Bunker Hill, Stockbridge, and White Oak. In Jackson County, it serves parts of the townships of Henrietta and Waterloo. In Livingston County, it serves parts of the townships of Iosco and Unadilla. In Washtenaw County, it serves part of Lyndon Township.

== History ==
Stockbridge's first school was established in 1836.

A 1925 profile of the school district in the Jackson Citizen Patriot noted an enrollment of 250, with 114 high school students, including seven seniors. The district had two small school buildings and a frame high school. The football team won about half of its games, the high school featured two debate teams, and a girls' basketball team had been formed, with a boys' team in the works.

A new high school was built in 1929. Additions were built in 1955, 1962, and 1969.

In 1953, Emma Smith retired from the district after a 34-year teaching career. Emma Smith Elementary, her namesake, was dedicated in October 1956.

The current high school, designed by architecture firm Manson-Jackson and Kane, opened in January 1976. It was dedicated on January 18, 1976. Seventh and eighth grade remained in the 1929 building, with sixth grade joining them in fall 1976.

Heritage School opened in February 2003. Enrollment was about 1,800 that year and growing steadily, however, two of the district's elementary schools closed in 2004: Katz Elementary in Munith and Howlett Elementary in Gregory, which became the Unadilla Township hall. As part of the same bond issue that funded Heritage School, Emma Smith Elementary was expanded. The architect for the projects was Fanning Howey.

Around 2015, students from the 1929 school were moved to the high school, forming Stockbridge Junior/Senior High School. The building was sold in 2018 and is used by the Stockbridge Police Department.

== Schools ==
Schools in Stockbridge Community Schools district
School	Address	Notes
Stockbridge Junior / Senior High School	416 N Clinton Street, Stockbridge	Grades 7–12. Built 1976.
Heritage School	222 Western Avenue, Stockbridge	Grades 3-6. Built 2003.
Emma Smith Elementary	100 Price Avenue, Stockbridge	Grades PreK-2. Built 1956.
