= Harper Creek Community Schools =

School district in Michigan

Address
- 7454 B Drive North Battle Creek, Calhoun, Michigan, 49014; United States

District information
- Grades: Pre-Kindergarten-12
- Superintendent: Rob Ridgeway
- Schools: 5
- Budget: $38,596,000 2021-2022 expenditures
- NCES District ID: 2617730

Students and staff
- Students: 2,778 (2024-2025)
- Teachers: 158.51 (on an FTE basis) (2024-2025)
- Staff: 349.46 FTE (2024-2025)
- Student–teacher ratio: 17.53 (2024-2025)

Other information
- Website: www.harpercreek.net

Harper Creek Community Schools is a public school district in Calhoun County, Michigan. It serves Emmett Township and parts of Battle Creek, Brownlee Park, Fredonia Township, Leroy Township, Marshall Township, Newton Township, and Pennfield Township.

== History ==
Formerly known as Calhoun Rural Agricultural school district, Harper Creek Community Schools took its present name in 1955. It had an enrollment of about 1,700 that year. Calhoun Rural Agricultural school district had formed in 1949 by the consolidation of schoolhouse districts in the area. As of fall 1957, the high school only went up to grade ten. A new high school building opened in 1958.

The current Harper Creek High School was completed in 2005. The former high school then became the middle school.

== Schools ==
Schools in Harper Creek Community Schools district
School	Address	Notes
Harper Creek High School	12677 Beadle Lake Road, Battle Creek	Grades 9-12. Built 2005.
Harper Creek Middle School	7290 B Drive North, Battle Creek	Grades 5-8. Formerly Harper Creek High School.
Beadle Lake Elementary	8175 C Drive North, Battle Creek	Grades PreK-4
Sonoma Elementary	4640 B Drive South, Battle Creek	Grades K-4
Wattles Park Elementary	132 South Wattles Road, Battle Creek	Grades K-4
