= Pennfield Schools =

School district in Michigan

Address
- 8587 Pennfield Road Battle Creek, Calhoun, Michigan, 49017; United States

District information
- Grades: Pre-Kindergarten-12
- Superintendent: Stephanie Lemmer
- Schools: 5
- Budget: $27,147,000 2021-2022 expenditures
- NCES District ID: 2627810

Students and staff
- Students: 1,877 (2024-2025)
- Teachers: 100.99 (on an FTE basis) (2024-2025)
- Staff: 235.39 FTE (2024-2025)
- Student–teacher ratio: 18.59 (2024-2025)

Other information
- Website: www.pennfield.net

Pennfield Schools is a public school district in West Michigan. In Calhoun County, it serves parts of Battle Creek, Brownlee Park, and parts of the townships of Bedford, Convis, and Pennfield. In Barry County, it serves parts of Assyria Township and Johnstown Township.

== History ==
The district originated with the Pennfield Township District No. 7 schoolhouse, which had 27 seats in a single elementary classroom. By 1915, many of the district's students attended school in Battle Creek because there was no room in the schoolhouse, and confusion arose over which district would receive the township's tax revenue. Crowded conditions continued in 1929, when consolidation with Battle Creek Public Schools was considered.

By 1947, the district had several elementary schools. That fall, the district assigned different grades to different schools for the first time. "Under the new plan, seventh and eighth grade pupils will attend one school, either the new building being erected on the Pennfield road school property or at Joy school No. 1. Hicks school will become a kindergarten school and Joy school No. 2 will have kindergarten and first graders on half-day schedules. All other schools will have pupils from first or second grade through the sixth grade," reported the Battle Creek Enquirer. Over the next nine years, voters would continue to debate annexation to the Battle Creek school district, establishing a high school of its own, and bond issues. Two new elementary schools were built in 1953.

The district established its own high school in fall 1956. The district was set to name it Dunlap High School after a long-serving school board trustee. Residents circulated a petition requesting the name Pennfield High School. This building is currently used as Dunlap Elementary. The district had previously sent its tenth through twelfth grade students to other districts' high schools.

East of the former high school, a new high school opened in 1962.

The current Pennfield High School opened in fall 2007. It was designed by Fanning Howey. The 1962 high school building became the district's middle school.

== Schools ==
Schools in Pennfield Schools district
School	Address	Notes
Pennfield High School	8299 Pennfield Road, Battle Creek	Grades 8-12. Built 2007.
Pennfield Middle School	8587 Pennfield Road, Battle Creek	Grades 5-7. Built 1962.
Dunlap Elementary	8465 Pennfield Road, Battle Creek	Grades 2-4. Built 1956.
North Penn Elementary	7422 Poorman Road, Battle Creek	Grades K-1
Purdy Elementary	6510 Purdy Road, Battle Creek	Grades K-2
