= Munith, Michigan =

- Unincorporated community
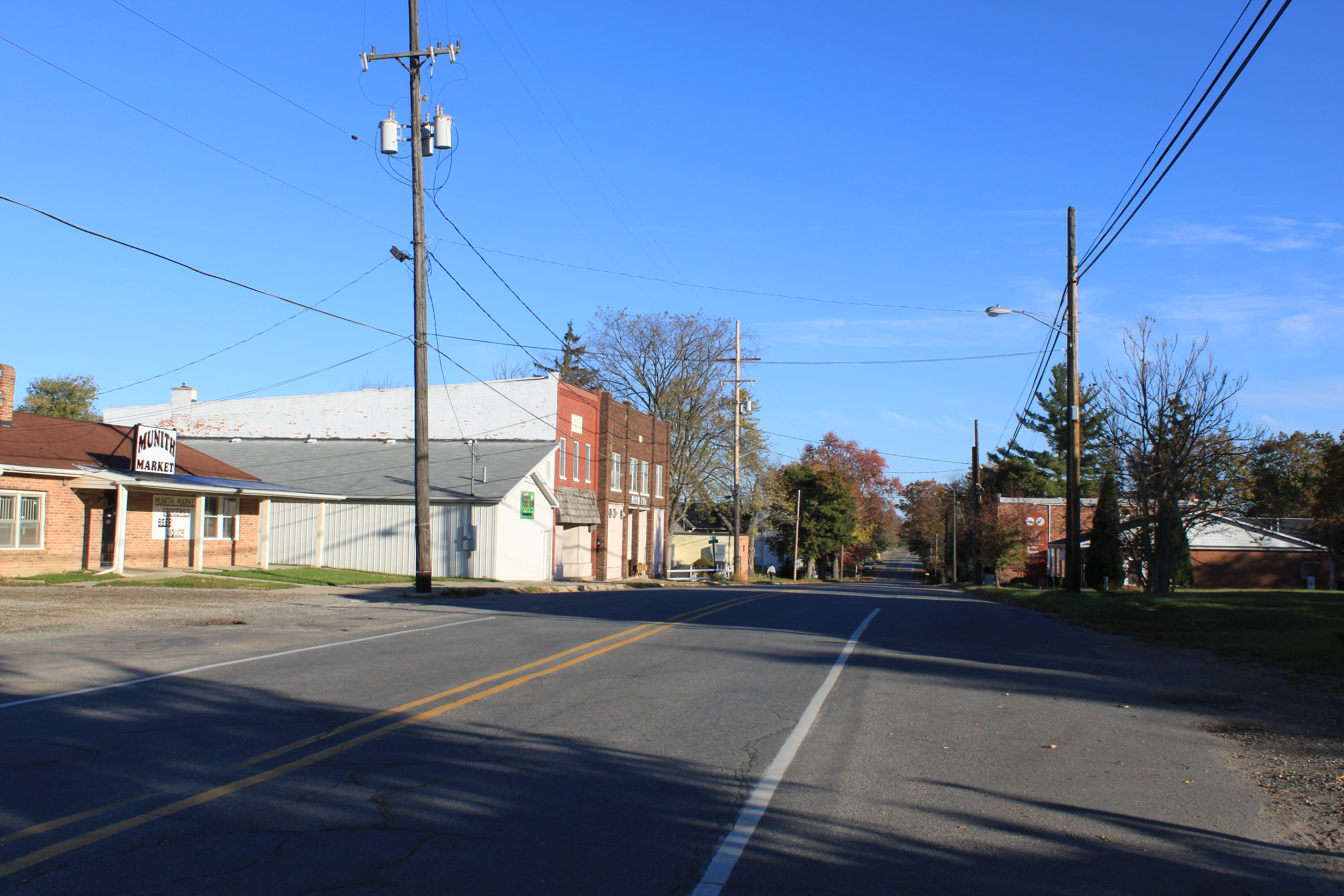
- Looking north along Main Street

- Location within the state of Michigan Munith (the United States)
- Coordinates: 42°23′26″N 84°15′02″W
- Country: United States
- State: Michigan
- County: Jackson
- Townships: Henrietta and Waterloo
- Elevation: 942 ft (287 m)
- Time zone: UTC-5 (Eastern (EST))
  - Summer (DST): UTC-4 (EDT)
- ZIP code(s): 49259
- Area code: 517
- FIPS code: 26-56260
- GNIS feature ID: 633123

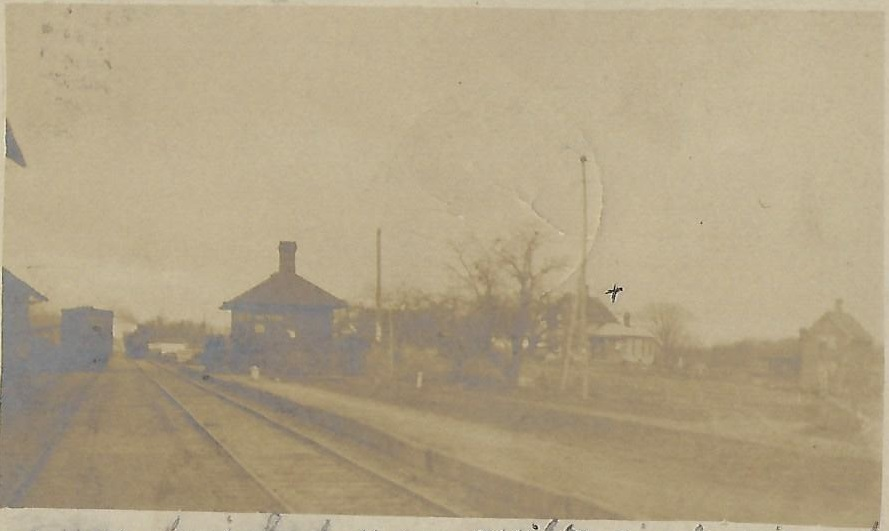
Munith Michigan from a 1906 postcard image

Munith is an unincorporated community in northeast Jackson County in the U.S. state of Michigan. It is located along M-106 on the boundary between Waterloo Township and Henrietta Township at 42°23′26″N 84°15′02″W.

The ZIP Code is 49259 and serves portions of both Henrietta and Waterloo townships.

In addition to the post office, there is a township hall, a cemetery, a gas station/convenience store, the headquarters of Farmers State Bank (member FDIC and an equal housing lender), and zero stoplights. The Munith area is served by the Stockbridge Community Schools, Northwest Community Schools, and East Jackson Community Schools. The community is home to two Christian congregations: Munith United Methodist Church on Main Street and Jeruel Baptist Church on M-106.
