= Capital Conference =

Capital Conference may refer to:

- Capital Area Activities Conference, a high school sports league
- Capital Athletic Conference, an intercollegiate athletic conference
