= Portage River (Michigan) =

Portage River may refer to the following streams in the U.S. state of Michigan:

- Portage River (Houghton County, Michigan), the southern end of the Keweenaw Waterway
- Portage River (Washtenaw County, Michigan), a tributary of the Huron River
- Portage River (Jackson County, Michigan), a tributary of the Grand River
- Portage River (Kalamazoo/St. Joseph Counties), a tributary of the St. Joseph River (Lake Michigan)
