= Big 8 Conference (MHSAA) =

Sports league

Big "8" Conference
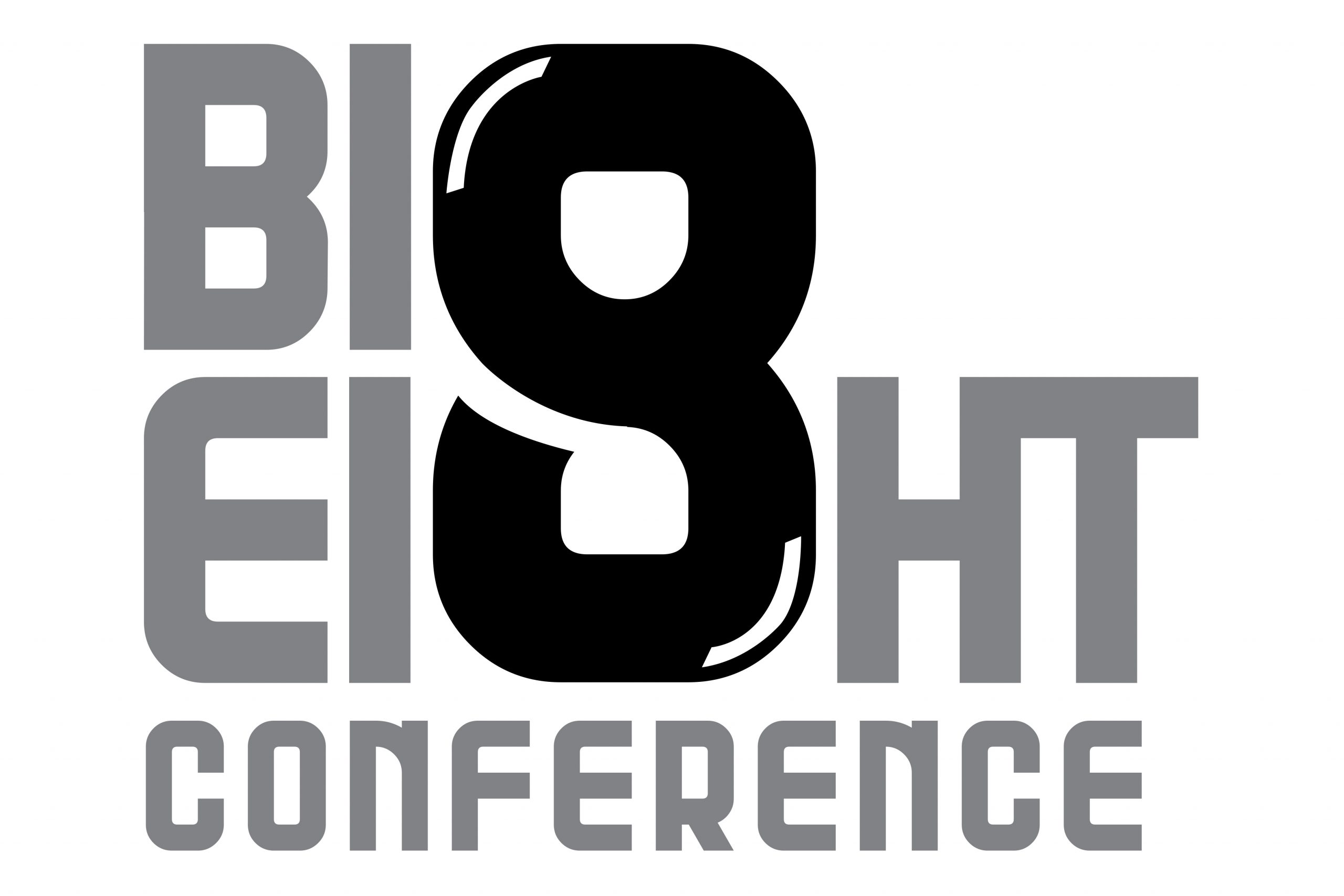
- Founded: 1973
- No. of teams: 10
- Country: United States
- Website: Big 8 Conference

The Big "8" Conference is a MHSAA athletic conference in South Central Michigan consisting of Class C schools from Branch, Eaton, Hillsdale, Ingham, and Jackson counties.

== History ==
=== Little "C" Conference (1932–73) ===
The beginning of the Big "8" Conference can be traced back to its predecessor, the Little "C" Conference, which was founded in 1931 and began play for the 1932–33 school year. The original members of this conference were Athens, Bronson, Homer, Jonesville, Litchfield, Quincy, Reading, and Union City. As the conference was founded during the Great Depression, the league schedule was developed to accommodate a short travel distance for each member school.

The Little "C" was a football only conference for the first two years of its existence. Baseball, basketball, and track and field weren't added until the 1934–35 school year.

The conference saw no change in membership for the first 37 years of its existence. The first change was after the 1968–69 school year when Litchfield, the smallest school in the league, left the Little "C" for the Mid-Southern Conference. The next year, Reading left the Little "C" to join the SCAA.

With only six members in the conference, the majority of the remaining members wanted to add two more teams to the league. However, this was voted down by Athens and Bronson. With expansion denied, the remaining four schools who voted for expansion would terminate the Little "C" Conference to begin a new conference with eight members in 1972. The 1972–73 school year would mark the 41st and final season of the Little "C" Conference. At the time of dissolution, the Little "C" was the longest existing conference with its original membership of schools in Michigan.

=== Founding and Stability (1973–2021) ===
Originally named the Big "8" Interscholastic Association, the conference began competition in the 1973–74 school year with all member schools being similar in make-up, enrollment, and a close proximity to one another. The association established a constitution in which defined the Big "8" as:

An organization to regulate and coordinate cooperative and competitive activities between member schools in all areas of student activities. In addition to athletics are band, student council, forensics, debate, and agricultural activities along with administrative exchange and other functions that could benefit by inter-school relationships.

The original members of the Big "8" were five of the six remaining Little "C" members Athens (who decided to remain despite voting down expansion), Homer, Jonesville, Quincy, and Union City along with Reading from the SCAA, Concord from the Cascades Conference and Springport from the Central Michigan Athletic Conference. Bronson, who had ambitions of joining the Twin Valley (which they never joined) was not an original member of the Big "8" and decided to become an Independent.

Like its predecessor, the Big "8" sustained an extended period of stability. In its first 44 years of existence, there were no members that left or were added to the conference. However, in 2016, Athens, who was the smallest member of the conference and suffering from declining enrollment, left the Big "8" after the 2016–17 school year to join the SCAA. Bronson, who was the only Little "C" member not to be a charter member of the Big "8", would replace Athens for the 2017–18 school year after spending a couple of years in the Berrien-Cass-St. Joseph League. Coincidentally, both these schools were the ones that voted against expansion of the Little "C".

From its founding in 1973 until 2001, media outlets would sometimes refer to the conference as Big 8 (East) differentiating from the Southwestern Michigan Athletic Conference (SMAC). The SMAC, which was nicknamed the Big 8 would be referred to the media as the Big 8 (West). This would become a moot point after the 2000–01 school year as the SMAC expanded to 16 teams and subsequently be nicknamed the Big 16.

=== Changes and Future (2021–present) ===
With the exception of Bronson replacing Athens for the 2017–18 school year, things were very quiet in the Big "8" prior to 2022 with the exception of Concord switching to 8-man football in 2021 as they joined the Tri-River 8-man Football League but would remain a member of the Big "8" for all other sports.

The summer of 2022 would begin some very major changes in the landscape of the conference. The Cascades Conference was looking to expand from eight to twelve members and would extend invitations to both Homer and Jonesville, who were charter members of both the Little "C" and Big "8". On June 27, Jonesville accepted their invitation to the Cascades Conference beginning in the 2023–24 school year. Three weeks later, on July 18, Homer also accepted the Cascades invitation to join the conference beginning in the 2023–24 school year.

With only six members left in the conference after Homer and Jonesville's departure, the league was looking to expand. On September 15, 2022, the Big "8" announced that Vermontville Maple Valley of the Greater Lansing Athletic Conference would become the seventh member of the Big "8" beginning the 2023–24 school year.

Sand Creek joined the Big "8" as a football-only member starting in 2024 while remaining in the Tri-County Conference (TCC) in all other sports. Maple Valley switched back to 11-man football after spending the previous few seasons playing 8-man football.

On January 30, 2024, the Big "8" announced that it'll return to eight members with Stockbridge joining the conference in the 2024–25 school year.

The conference expanded to ten full members effective the 2026–27 school year with both East Jackson joining and Homer rejoining. Both schools joined from the Cascades Conference.

In October 2025 Sand Creek announced it would leave the Big "8" after the 2025 season to form the football only Great Lakes Conference with TCC members Whiteford, Summerfield, Erie Mason, and four schools from Ohio

In December 2025, Stockbridge announced that they would leave the Big "8" after the 2026–27 season to join the Cascades Conference.

== Member schools ==
=== Current members ===
School	Nickname	Location	Class	Enrollment (Note: Enrollment numbers are as of the 2026–27 school year.)	Joined	Previous Conference	Colors
Bronson	Vikings	Bronson, Branch County	C	306	2017	Berrien-Cass-St. Joseph Conference	
Concord (Note: Concord currently participates in 8-man football as members of the Southern Central Athletic Association.)	Yellowjackets	Concord, Jackson County	C	177	1973	Cascades Conference	
East Jackson	Trojans	Jackson, Jackson County	C	182	2026	Cascades Conference	
Homer	Trojans	Homer, Calhoun County	C	228	1973 (Note: Homer left the Big 8 Conference in 2023 to join the Cascades Conference); 2026	Cascades Conference	
Maple Valley	Lions	Vermontville, Eaton County	C	234	2023	Greater Lansing Athletic Conference	
Quincy	Orioles	Quincy, Branch County	C	334	1973	Little "C" Conference	
Reading	Rangers	Reading, Hillsdale County	C	184	1973	Southern Central Athletic Association	
Springport	Spartans	Springport, Jackson County	C	250	1973	Central Michigan Athletic Conference	
Stockbridge (Note: Stockbridge will be leaving the Big "8" after the 2026-27 season to join the Cascades Conference.)	Panthers	Stockbridge, Ingham County	C	323	2024	Independent	
Union City	Chargers	Union City, Branch County	C	276	1973	Little "C" Conference	

=== Former members ===
School	Nickname	Location	Joined (Note: Represents the calendar year when fall sports competition begins.)	Previous Conference	Left (Note: Represents the calendar year when spring sports competition end.)	Successive Conference	Colors
Athens	Indians	Athens, Calhoun County	1973	Little "C" Conference	2017	Southern Central Athletic Association	
Jonesville	Comets	Jonesville, Hillsdale County	1973	Little "C" Conference	2023	Cascades Conference	

=== Former associate members ===
School	Nickname	Location	Joined (Note: Represents the calendar year when fall sports competition begins.)	Left (Note: Represents the calendar year when spring sports competition end.)	Big 8 Sport	Primary Conference	Conference in former Big 8 Sport	Colors
Sand Creek	Aggies	Sand Creek, Lenawee County	2024	2026	Football	Tri-County Conference	Great Lakes Conference	

=== Membership Timeline ===
Full member (11-man football) Full member (8-man football) Full member (non-football) Associate member (11-man football) Other Conference

== Conference Sports ==
The Big "8" Conference currently sponsors 15 sports (8 boys and 7 girls).

Conference sports
Sport	Men's	Women's
Baseball	✓	
Basketball	✓	✓
Competitive cheer		✓
Cross country	✓	✓
Football	✓	
Golf	✓	
Soccer	✓	✓
Softball		✓
Track and field	✓	✓
Volleyball		✓
Wrestling	✓	
