= Pennfield Senior High School =

Pennfield High School

Location
- 8299 Pennfield Road; Battle Creek, Michigan 49017; United States; 42°22′16″N 85°08′11″W

Information
- School type: Public high school
- Founded: 1953
- School district: Pennfield Schools
- Superintendent: Stephanie Lemmer
- Principal: Catrina Hill
- Teaching staff: 31.65 (FTE)
- Grades: 8-12
- Enrollment: 778 (2023-2024)
- Student to teacher ratio: 24.58
- Colors: Green and white
- Athletics conference: Interstate 8 Athletic Conference
- Nickname: Panthers
- Website: www.pennfield.net/o/phs

Pennfield High School is the lone public high school of the Pennfield Schools district which serves Pennfield Township just north of Battle Creek in Calhoun County, Michigan.

== Demographics ==
The demographic breakdown of the 675 students enrolled in 2015-2016 was:

- Male - 48.9%
- Female - 51.1%
- Native American/Alaskan - 1.2%
- Asian/Pacific islanders - 0.6%
- Black - 6.1%
- Hispanic - 4.6%
- White - 83.3%
- Multiracial - 4.3%

36.1% of the students were eligible for free or reduced-cost lunch.

== Athletics ==
The Pennfield Panthers compete in the Interstate 8 Athletic Conference. The school colors are green and white. The following Michigan High School Athletic Association (MHSAA) sanctioned varsity sports are offered:

- Baseball (boys)
- Basketball (girls and boys)
  - Girls state champion - 1980
- Bowling (girls and boys)
- Competitive cheer (girls)
- Cross country (girls and boys)
- Football (boys)
  - State champion - 1991
- Golf (girls and boys)
- Lacrosse (boys)
- Soccer (girls and boys)
- Softball (girls)
- Swim and dive (girls and boys)
- Tennis (girls and boys)
- Track and field (girls and boys)
- Volleyball (girls)
  - State champion - 1979, 1981
- Wrestling (boys)
  - State champion - 1992

== Notable alumni ==
- Lance Barber, television actor
- Randy Erskine, professional golfer
- Rob Van Dam, professional wrestler
