= Pleasant Lake, Michigan =

- Unincorporated community
- Location within the state of Michigan Pleasant Lake (the United States)
- Coordinates: 42°22′48″N 84°20′57″W
- Country: United States
- State: Michigan
- County: Jackson
- Township: Henrietta
- Platted: 1868
- Elevation: 955 ft (291 m)
- Time zone: UTC-5 (Eastern (EST))
  - Summer (DST): UTC-4 (EDT)
- ZIP code(s): 49272
- Area code: 517
- GNIS feature ID: 635107

Pleasant Lake is an unincorporated community in Jackson County in the U.S. state of Michigan. The community is located in Henrietta Township just south of the lake of the same name. Pleasant Lake has a post office with the ZIP Code 49272. In addition to the post office, there is a party store, gas station, a Dollar General, an Independent Bank, an Inn, a golf course/ restaurant, and Christ Episcopal Church.

== History ==
Pleasant Lake was originally known as Spring Lake until John Wenstren renamed the community in 1836. The community was platted in 1868. A post office opened in Pleasant Lake on October 13, 1961; Leo E. Osterberg was its first postmaster.
