= D. J. Young =

American football player (born 1988)

No. 58 – Ottawa Redblacks
- Position: Offensive tackle

Personal information
- Born: January 26, 1988 (age 38); Lansing, Michigan, U.S.
- Listed height: 6 ft 5 in (1.96 m)
- Listed weight: 298 lb (135 kg)

Career information
- College: Michigan State
- NFL draft: 2011: undrafted

Career history
- Arizona Cardinals (2011); Cleveland Browns (2012)*; New York Jets (2013)*; St. Louis Rams (2013)*
- * Offseason or practice squad member only

Awards and highlights
- Second-team All-Big Ten (2010)
- Stats at Pro Football Reference

Curtis Duane Young Jr. (born January 26, 1988) is an American football offensive tackle. He was signed by the Arizona Cardinals as an undrafted free agent in 2011. He played college football at Michigan State.

== Early life ==
He attended J. W. Sexton High School in Lansing, Michigan. He was selected to play in the 2006 Michigan High School Football Coaches Association All-Star Game. He was named to the Detroit Free Press All-State Dream Team in his senior season at high school. He also was selected as the Big Red's Defensive Player of the Year also in his senior season.

== College career ==
He spent his freshman and sophomore seasons at Bowling Green. He transfer to Lansing Community College prior to the 2008 season. He spent his Junior and senior season at Michigan State. He was named Lineman of the Week vs. Northwestern during his junior season. In his Senior season, he was selected to the second-team All-Big Ten. He was selected to the second-team All-Big Ten by Rivals.com and Phil Steele.

== Professional career ==
=== Arizona Cardinals ===
On July 26, 2011, he signed with the Arizona Cardinals as an undrafted free agent. On September 2, 2011, he was released. On September 5, he re-signed with the team to join the practice squad. On December 28, 2011, he was promoted to the active roster. On August 31, 2012, he was released on the day of final roster cuts.

=== Cleveland Browns ===
On September 11, 2012, he signed with the Cleveland Browns to join the practice squad.

=== New York Jets ===
Young was signed by the New York Jets on January 17, 2013, to a reserve/future contract. He was waived on April 30, 2013.

=== St. Louis Rams ===
On August 12, 2013, Young was signed by the St. Louis Rams.

== Personal life ==
He is the son of Duane Young and Angela Anderson. His father was a tight end of the National Football League, where he played six seasons. He played for two teams in his NFL career, the San Diego Chargers (1991–1995) and the Buffalo Bills (1998).
