= J. W. Sexton High School =

High school in Michigan, United States

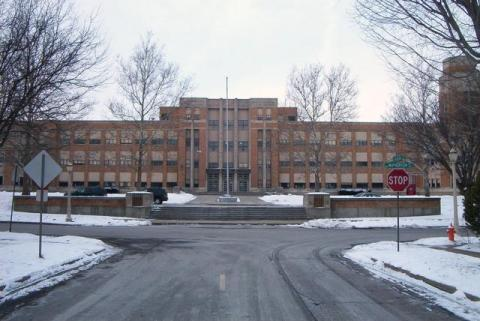

Location
- 102 South McPherson Avenue; Lansing, Michigan 48915; United States
- Coordinates: 42°43′58″N 84°34′32″W

Information
- Type: Public
- Established: 1943
- School district: Lansing School District
- Principal: Daniel Boggan
- Teaching staff: 36.36 (FTE)
- Grades: 7 to 12
- Enrollment: 745 (2023-2024)
- Student to teacher ratio: 20.49
- Colors: Red and white
- Athletics conference: MHSAA, Class B Capital Area Activities Conference
- Nickname: J-Dubbs
- Website: www.lansingschools.net/sexton/

Student assessments
- 2021–22 school year Change vs. prior year

M-STEP 11th grade proficiency rates (Science / Social Studies)
- Advanced %: ≤5 / ≤5
- Proficient %: – / –
- PR. Proficient %: 7.5 / 54.9
- Not Proficient %: 85.8 / 37.3

Average test scores
- SAT Total: 774.1 (▼ −101.8)

J. W. Sexton High School is a public school located on the western edge of Lansing, Michigan, United States, in the Lansing School District. The principal is currently Daniel Boggan. The Sexton J-Dubbs are members of the Capital Area Activities Conference. The school has a fierce rivalry with the Everett Vikings of Everett High School on the south side of the city. In March 2012 the Lansing School District announced that Sexton would house grades 7-12 beginning in the 2012–2013 school year.

== Building and architecture ==
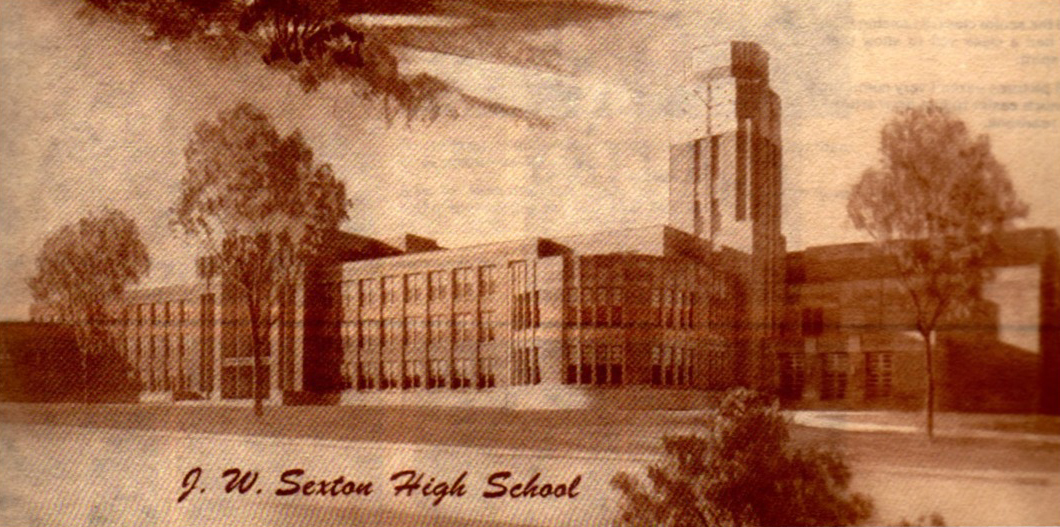
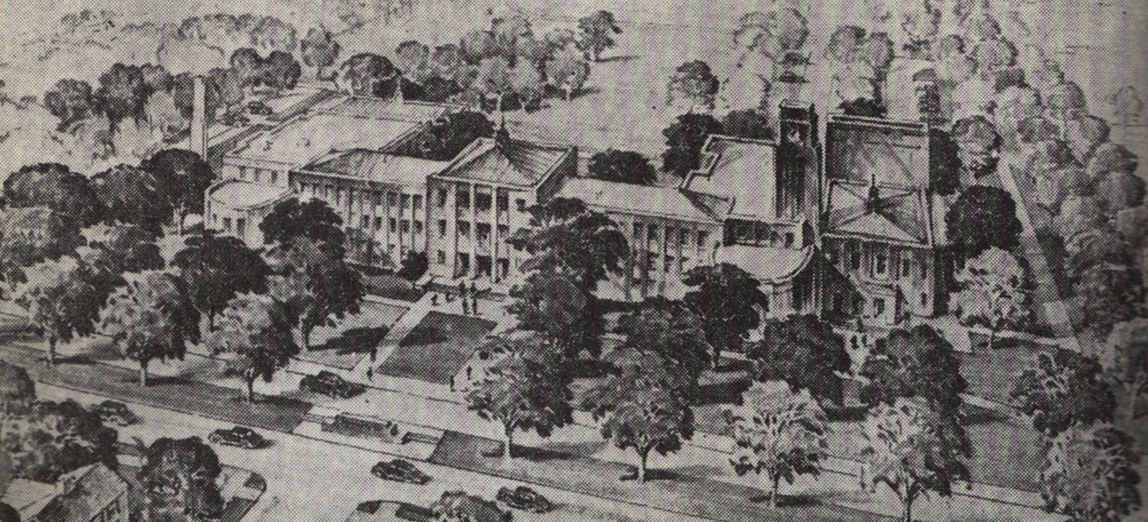
J. W. Sexton High School, concept sketches

Of the Lansing high schools, J. W. Sexton High School is the most important in terms of architectural innovation. Designed by the architectural firm Warren S. Holmes Company, in its heyday, Architectural Record called Sexton "a flexible school with latest facilities". Original designs were begun in 1939, and the school district allowed the firm to take two years to draw up an economic, yet long lasting design.

=== Construction ===
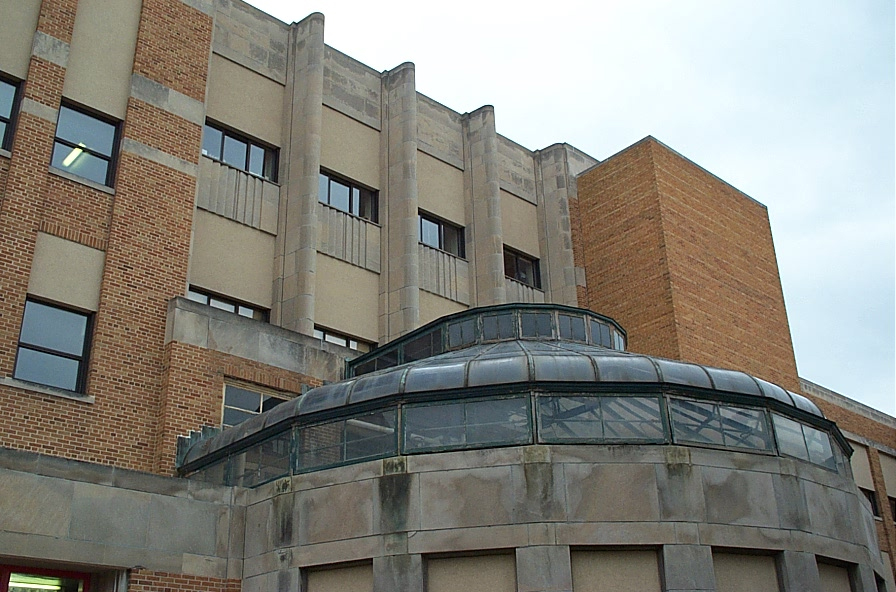
J. W. Sexton High School, conservatory, exterior, 2002

The Warren S. Holmes Co. emphasized that the most important part of the entire project was the planning. The firm spent over a year researching the community's needs and wants to create an appropriate structure. Retired structural engineer and partner of the firm, Howard Hunter, recalled an amusing anecdote. He remembered that when the firm was researching what educators wanted in their new school, the biology/taxidermy teacher said he would like a conservatory large enough to house considerably sized animals and maintain an entire ecosystem. This was of course beyond the scope of a high school and was not constructed. However, a bigger than average conservatory was built to satisfy the teacher.

Construction commenced in 1941, prior to the United States' involvement in World War II. After the bombing of Pearl Harbor in December, construction materials were seized by the government for war production. Nevertheless, the Lansing School District sent representatives to Washington D.C. to request materials. After some haggling, the government agreed it was in the country's interests to complete the school. More funding for construction was procured from the Public Works Administration. With these materials and money, construction progressed over the next two years, and the school was ready for occupation in 1943.

However, because of the war, some designs were changed and delayed. While the auditorium's exterior was completed in 1943, the interior was not constructed until 1949, well after the war. Because of financial constraints, a natatorium was not added until 1956. Elaborate roofs were scrapped for simple flat roofs, and simple unadorned porcelain fixtures were substituted in place of more elaborate chrome ones. After all construction was completed in 1956, the Lansing School District had spent $2,053,494 ($24.3 million in 2025 dollars).

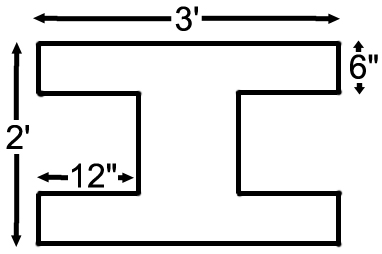
Modular "H" column cross-section

Because of a modular system of construction, the school was constructed rather efficiently. One technique was actually created by the Warren S. Holmes Company. It involved using an "H" column for all vertical supports. It consisted of reinforced concrete in the form of an "H", hence the name. These columns were placed every ten feet, and the twelve inch by twelve inch cavities could be used to run conduit, ventilation, and plumbing. All cabinetry, windows, and doors were interchangeable and standardized. According to Architectural Record, each room was planned to be its own complete unit. " 'Each unit 10 by 12 ft.,' report the architects, 'was designed as a complete element within itself, having its own light, both artificial and natural, heating, ventilation, electric wiring, case and cupboard spaces, and in general adapting itself to the same utilitarian manner as a sectional bookcase' ".

Once completed, the school was hailed as having the most modern facilities and innovations. The school has total capacity for 2,056 pupils and includes modern science labs, a home economics lab, a metal shop, a wood shop, a large boiler plant to provide steam heat, several classrooms with stages for dramatics and speech, an auditorium seating 1,783, a cafeteria capacity for 400, and a gymnasium with room for 2,200 spectators.

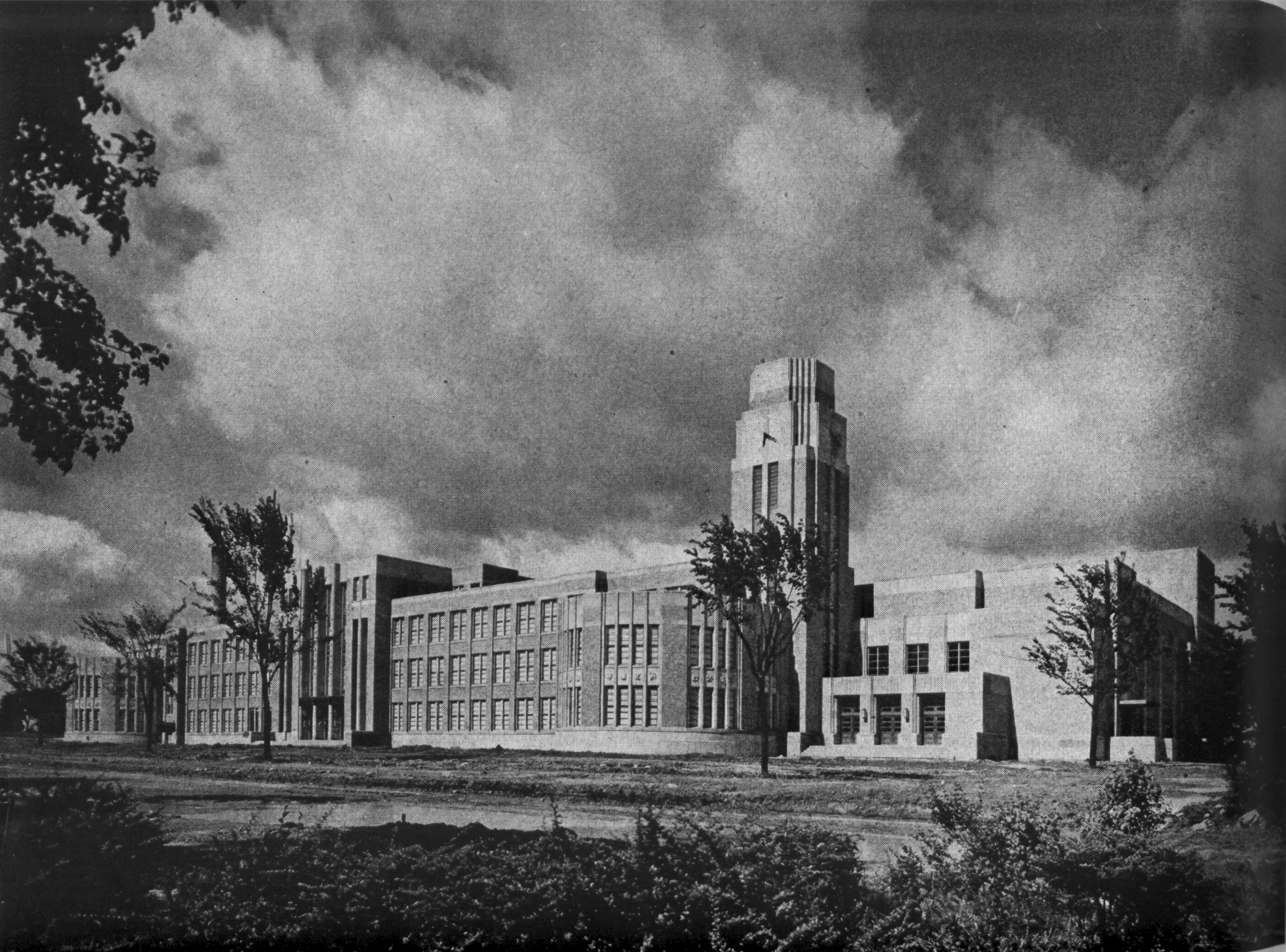
1944

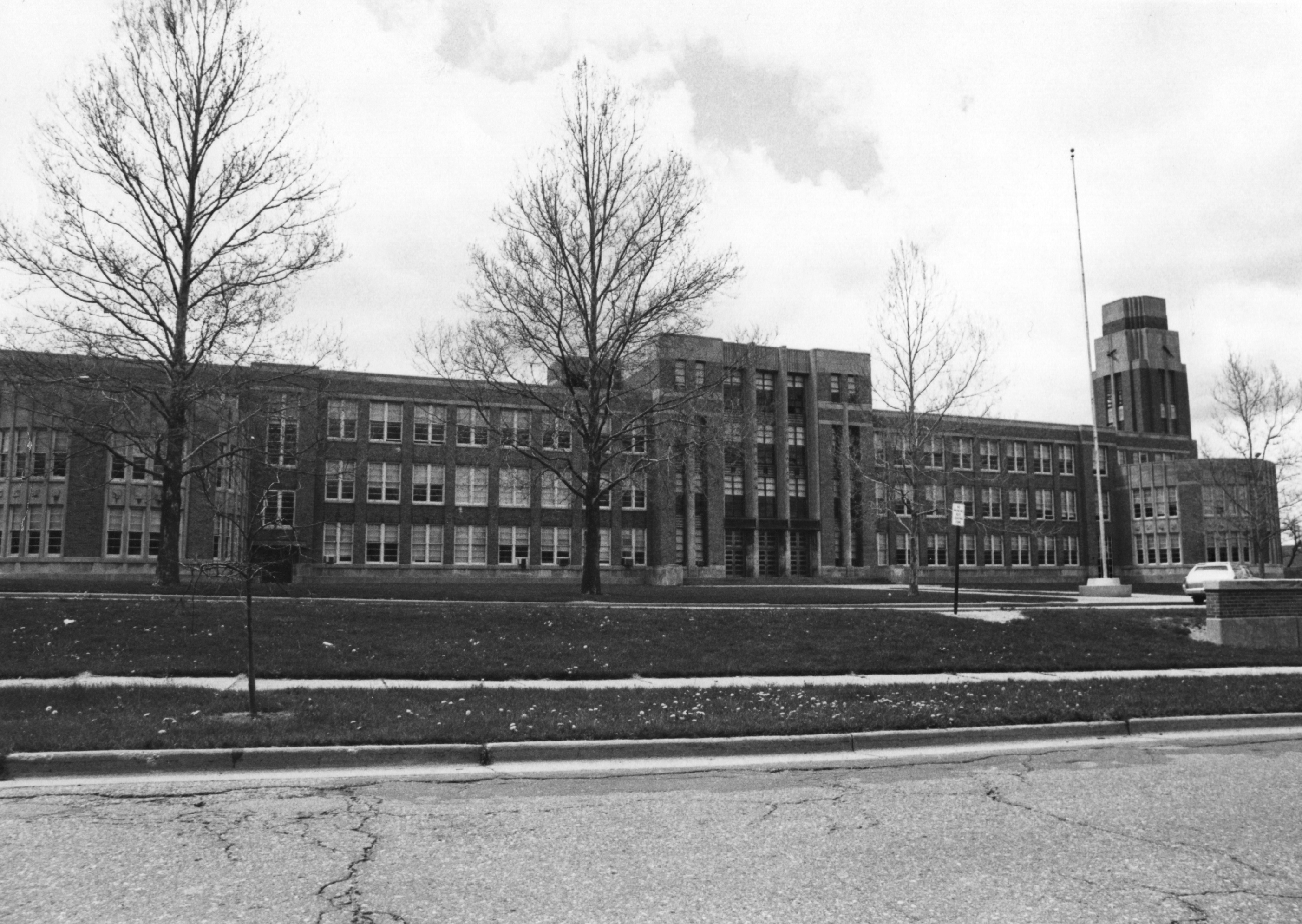
1943

J. W. Sexton High School, Exterior

=== Exterior ===
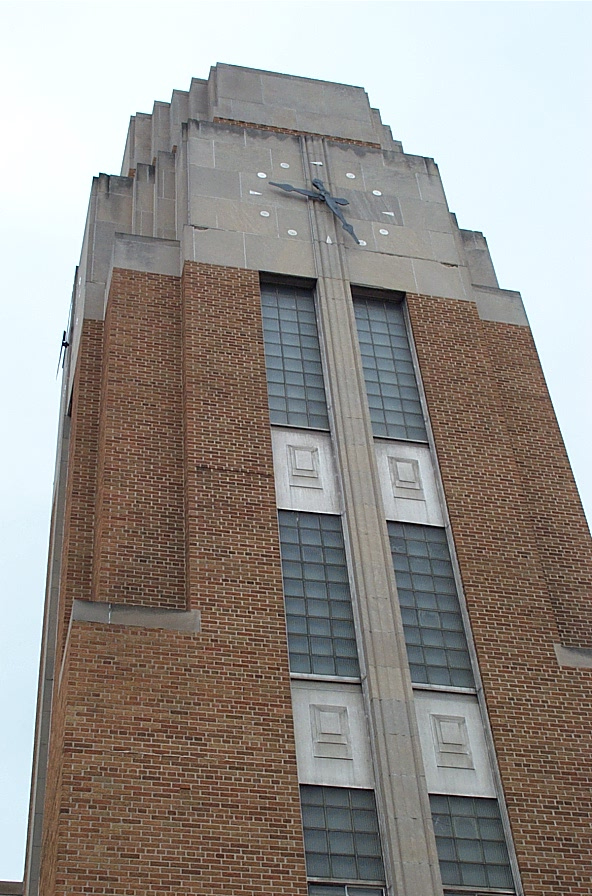
Clock tower

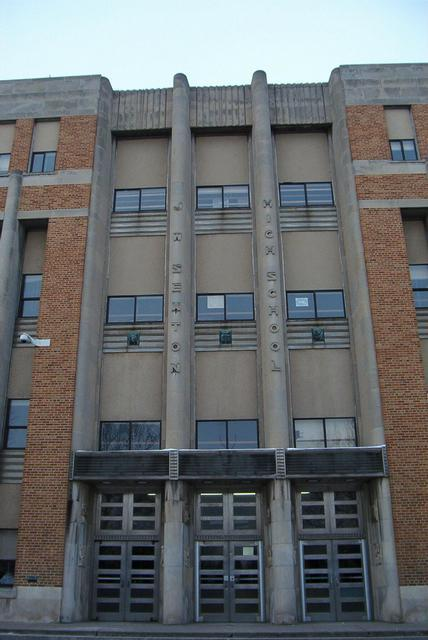
Front detail

J. W. Sexton High School, exterior, 2002

Sexton High School was not only an engineering marvel, it was a piece of architectural art. The school was designed at the very end of the Art Deco period. Had it been designed just a few years later, it probably would have been in the International style. The geometric characteristics of the Art Deco style are quite prominent in Sexton's exterior. When one first looks at the building, the eye is immediately drawn to the eight-story clock tower flanking the north end of the building. At the top, the corners have a stepped look, which is common among Art Deco buildings. As the tower grows in height, there are step backs, providing a telescope effect. Below the clock face, narrow glass block windows and chrome spandrels give an extra sense of height to the tower.

This verticality, while no longer as prominent of a feature, can still be seen elsewhere on the school. On the front of building above the main entrance, windows once stretched vertically between the spandrels, but have since been replaced with smaller horizontal windows and the remaining cavity was filled with an insulating stucco material. Between the windows, a band of concrete emblazoned with the school's name extends to the top of the building. Originally, all the windows had a vertical effect, but the replacement has altered its appearance. The change is quite apparent in photos to the right and the left. The new windows drastically decrease the sense of verticality.

Probably the most unusual feature of Sexton High is its exterior concrete reliefs by Corrado Parducci and interior decorative tile. On the school's north face, ten educational-based reliefs adorn the side of the auditorium. The sculptures represent art, chivalry, drama, education, geography, labor, law, literature, music, and pioneering. Farther down the wall, a choral group can be seen singing around a piano. Along the sides of the approach to the auditorium, the puppets Punch and Judy can be seen. Additionally, along the two curved exterior walls, the spandrels have more carvings that depict different educational themes.

Exterior sculptures by Corrado Parducci
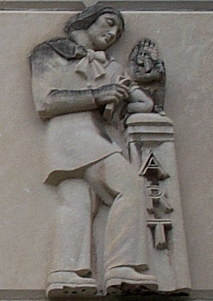
Art

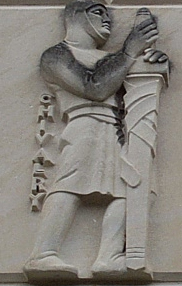
Chivalry

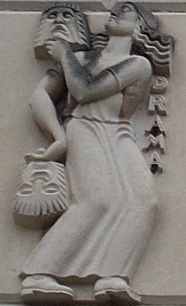
Drama

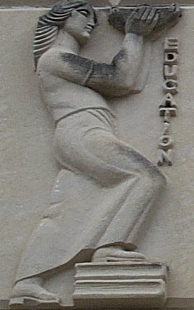
Education

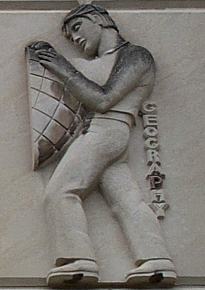
Geography

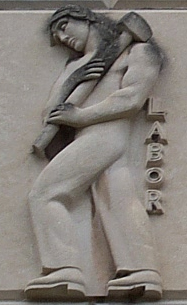
Labor

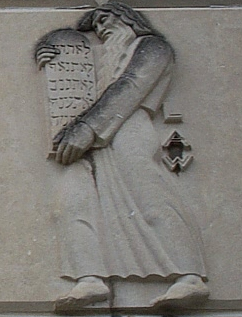
Law

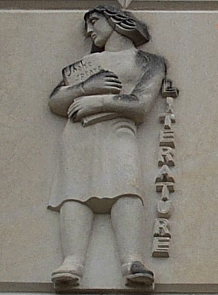
Literature

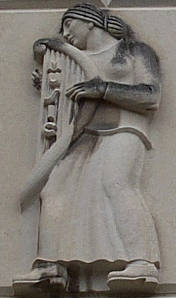
Music

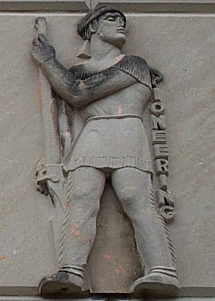
Pioneering

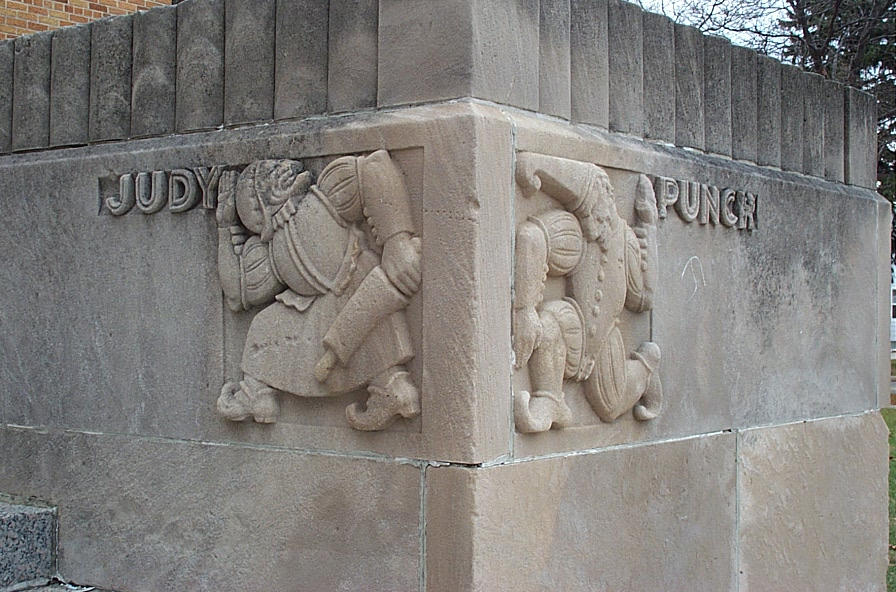
Punch and Judy

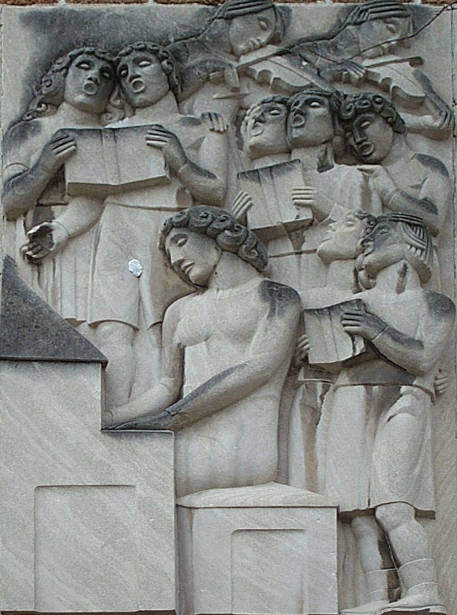
Choral Scene

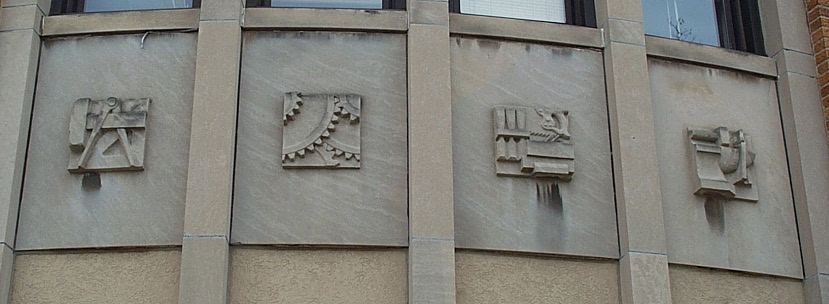
Spandrel reliefs

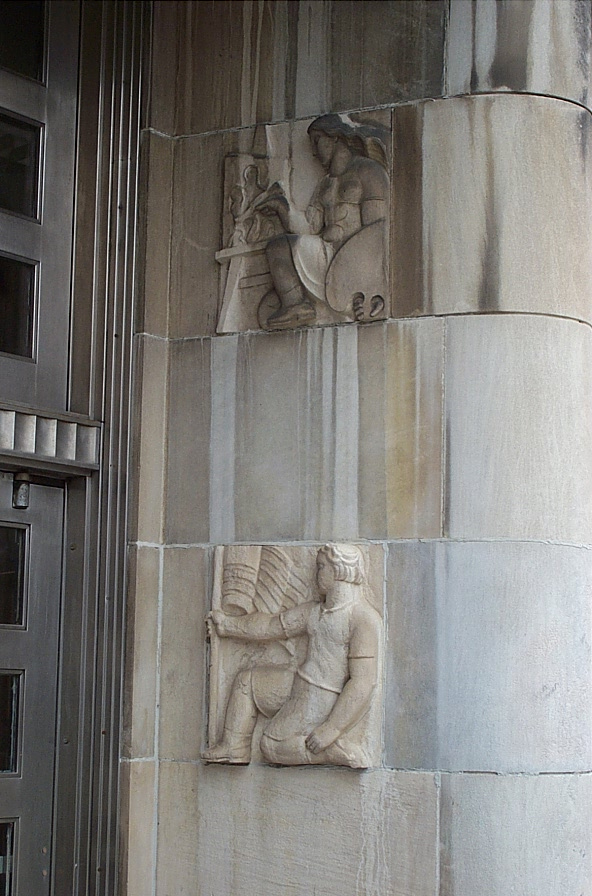
Front entrance reliefs

=== Interior ===
Inside the school are many subtle decorations. Upon entering the main foyer, the viewer steps upon the mosaic tiled Michigan Seal set into the durable terrazzo floor. These patterns are used at major junctions of the building. Outside the auditorium, drama masks are set into the floor. In the sciences wing, test tubes and a balance demonstrate the sciences. Near the foods lab, or home economics room, the pattern shows textiles and food preparation.

Throughout the building decorative tiles are used on the hallways. These tiles were created by the interior designer specifically for Sexton High. To minimize the cost of custom tiles, Warren S. Holmes Co. convinced the tile makers to make the tiles standard stock, with little extra cost to the school district. In fact, Warren S. Holmes Co. used some of the same tiles on other schools later. The variety of tiles is staggering. They represent many different things. Among other tiles, there are Shakespearean characters, mythological creatures, signs of the zodiac, different culture representations, and sports characters.

In general, the interior of Sexton High School is large and bright because of the large number of windows. Upon entering the main chrome doors, the hallway opens up into a spacious curve-walled foyer with benches. All the paneling is made of oak and stained a rather light shade. To the left of the foyer is a social room. Originally, it had inlaid hardwood floors and oak wainscoting. While the wainscoting has endured, the hardwood floor has since been covered by a carpet due to years of wear caused by chairs and tables being dragged across it.

Other notable rooms include the auditorium and library. The auditorium is large for a high school building and includes a balcony for more accommodation of students. It is simple, yet elegant. The balcony smoothly curves over the orchestra seats and the colors are simple white walls with red chairs—Sexton's colors. The library is equally attractive. Again, oak is the wood of preference. The circulation desk, built-in bookshelves, and furniture are all made of oak. The floor is made of a vinyl linoleum and includes a decorative pattern. Unfortunately, the floor has been covered with carpeting due to years of wear. However, most of the original furniture has remained.

Interior mosaics and tiles
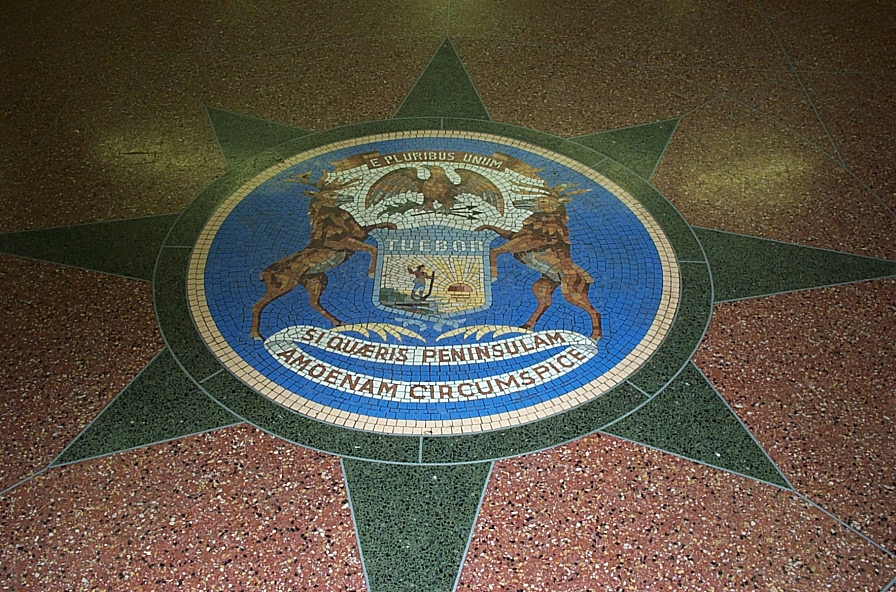
The Great Seal of the State of Michigan

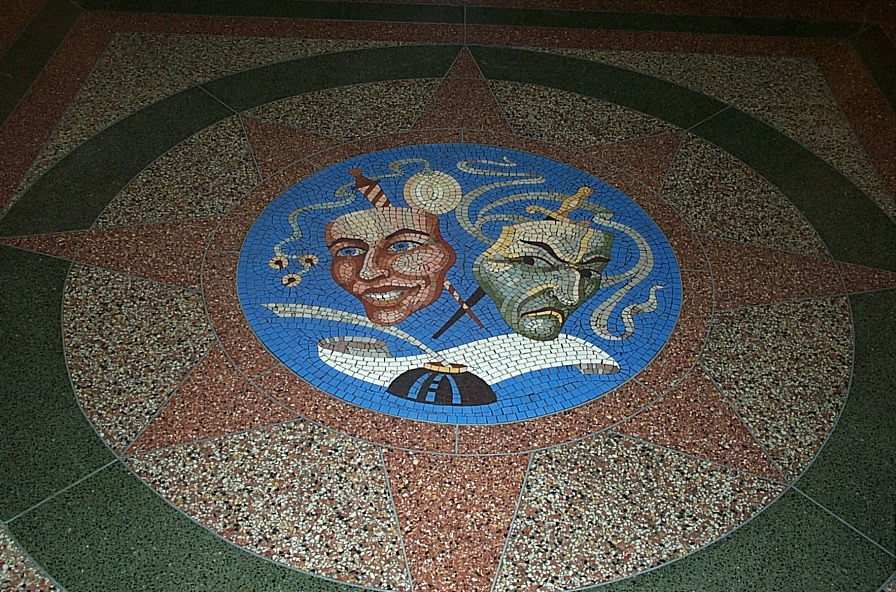
Comedy and Tragedy

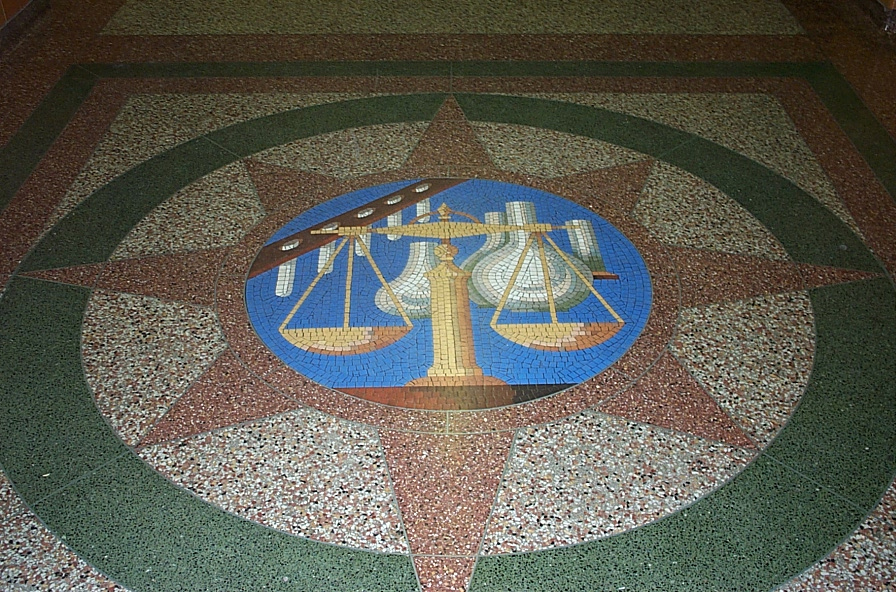
Chemistry

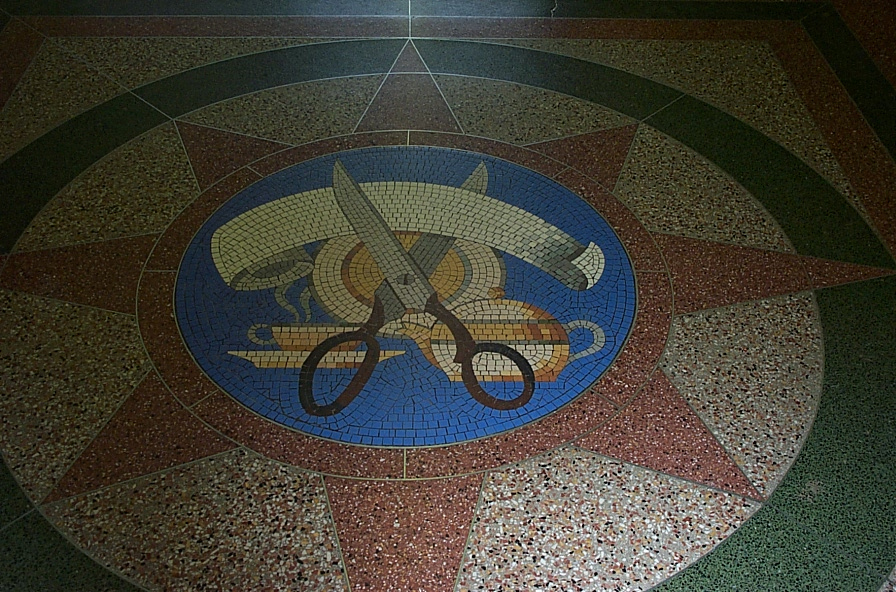
Home Economics

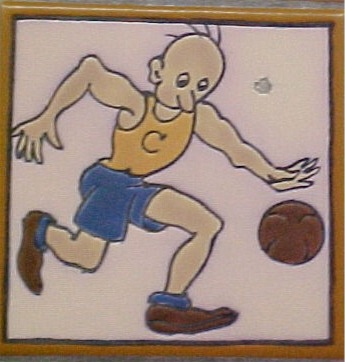
Basketball

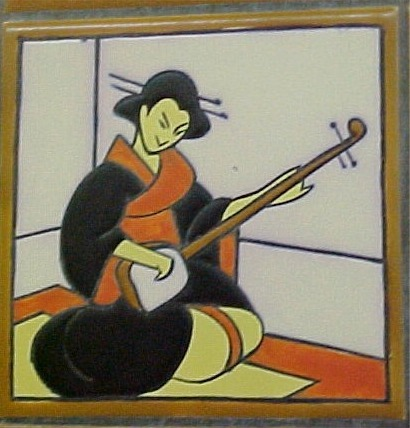
Asian

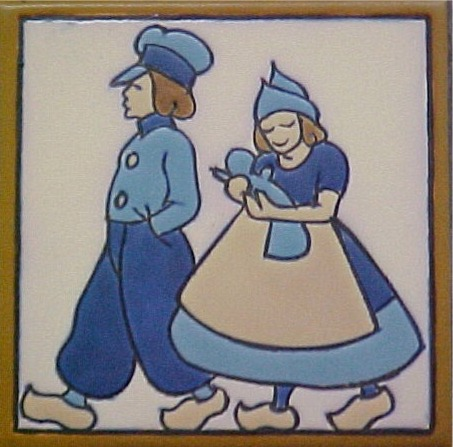
Dutch Boy and Girl

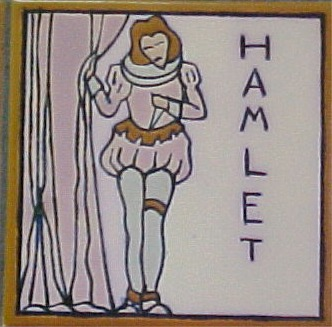
Hamlet

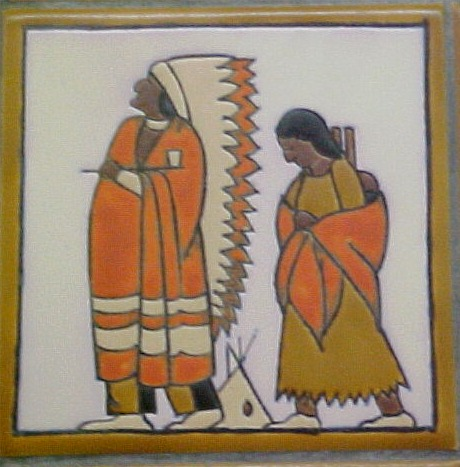
Native Americans

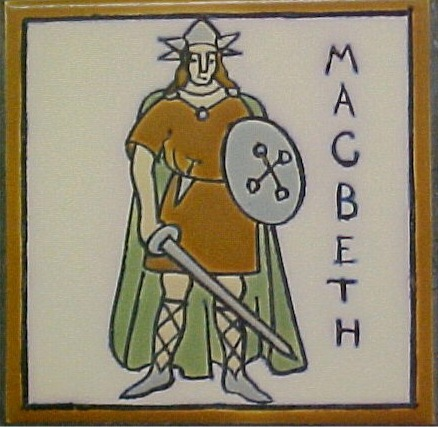
Macbeth

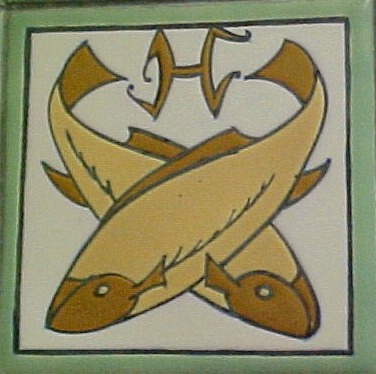
Pisces

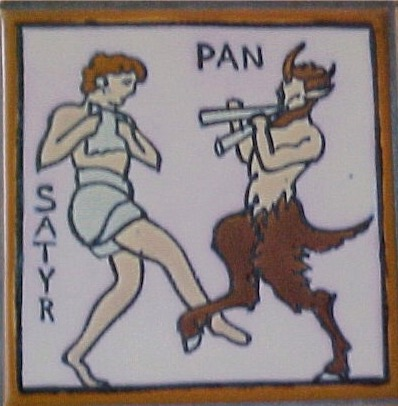
Pan and Satyr

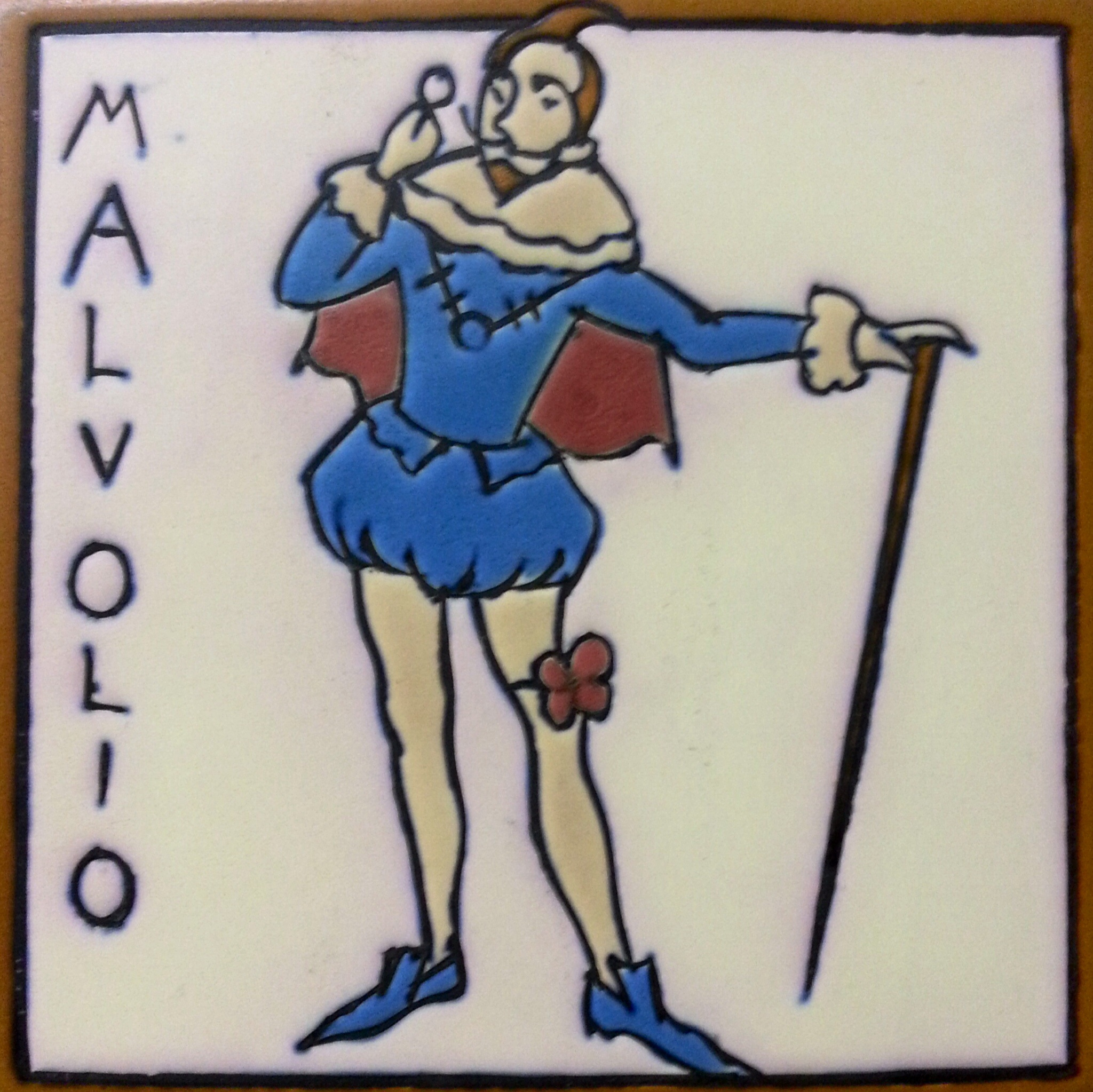
Malvolio

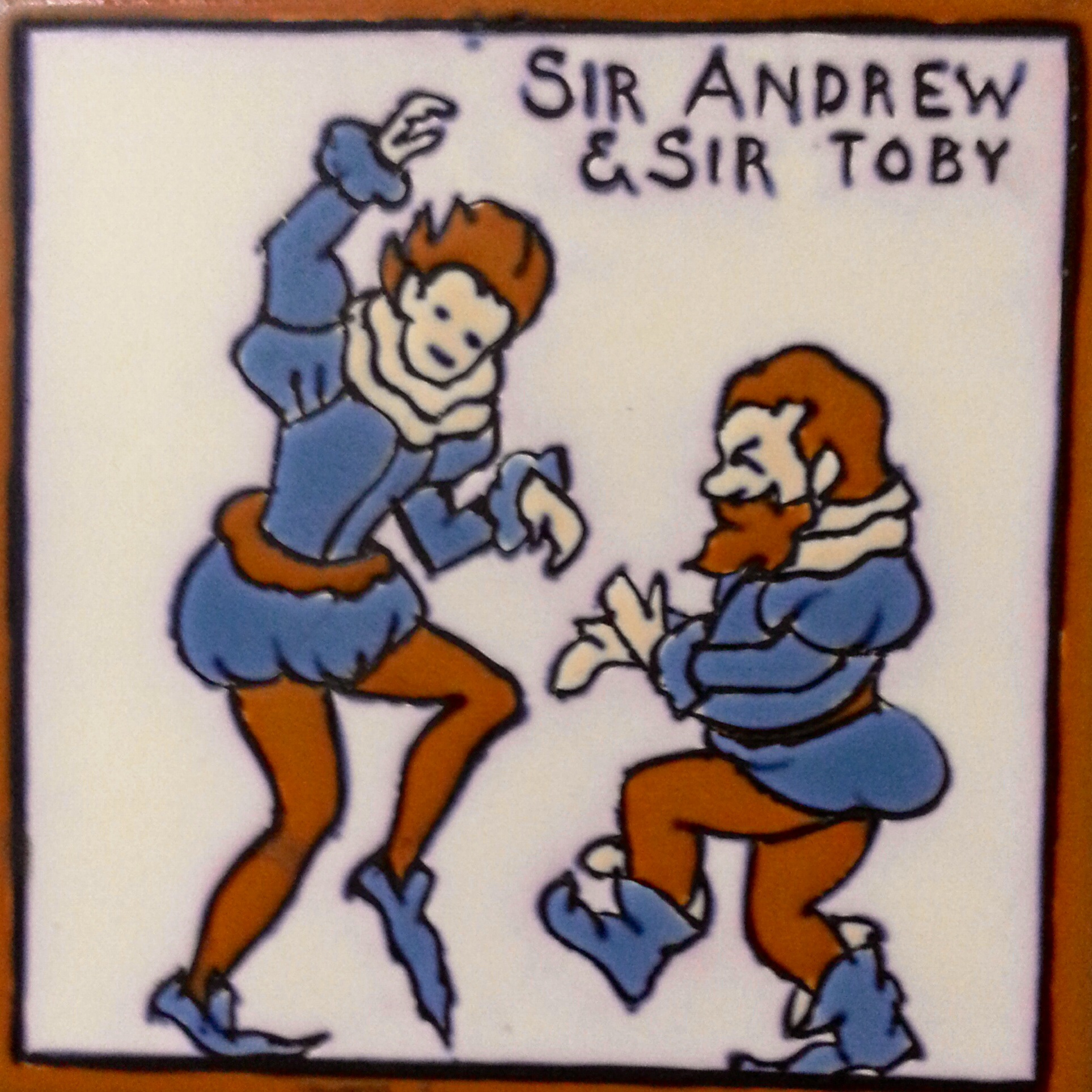
Sir Andrew & Sir Toby

== Theater program ==
Sexton is one of the only area schools to have an active chapter of the International Thespian Society, Troupe #3911.

== Notable alumni ==
- Andrew Beal, billionaire banker
- Karl Brooks, NFL defensive tackle for the Green Bay Packers
- Dave Campbell Pro baseball player and announcer on ESPN
- Gary Chartrand, mathematician (graph theory)
- Anthony Clemmons, basketball player
- Bryn Forbes, basketball player for the San Antonio Spurs, NBA champion with the Milwaukee Bucks 2021, formerly for the Michigan State Spartans.
- Larry Foster, former MLB player for the Detroit Tigers
- Ahney Her, actress in Gran Torino
- Alan Haller, NFL defensive back, Athletic Director at Michigan State University
- Dave Porter, three-time All-American and two-time NCAA Champion heavyweight wrestler
- Jeremy Rall, music video director, photographer and independent film director, graduated in 1991
- Denzel Valentine, NBA player for the Chicago Bulls
- Drew Valentine, Head basketball coach for Loyola University Chicago
- Amalia Villarreal, soccer player
- Saddi Washington, basketball coach
- Doug Worgul, author of Thin Blue Smoke; A Table Full of Welcome; The Grand Barbecue: A Celebration of the History; and Kansas City Quiltmakers: Portraits & Patterns
- D. J. Young, NFL player for the Arizona Cardinals
