= Brock Gutierrez =

American football player (born 1973)

No. 62, 52, 63
- Position: Center

Personal information
- Born: September 25, 1973 (age 53); Charlotte, Michigan, U.S.
- Listed height: 6 ft 3 in (1.91 m)
- Listed weight: 304 lb (138 kg)

Career information
- High school: Charlotte
- College: Central Michigan
- NFL draft: 1996: undrafted

Career history
- Cincinnati Bengals (1996–1997); Jacksonville Jaguars (1998)*; Cincinnati Bengals (1998–2002); San Francisco 49ers (2003–2004); Detroit Lions (2005)
- * Offseason or practice squad member only

Awards and highlights
- First-team All-MAC (1995)

Career NFL statistics
- Games played: 114
- Games started: 23
- Fumble recoveries: 1
- Stats at Pro Football Reference

James Brock Gutierrez (born September 25, 1973) is an American former professional football player who was a center for nine seasons in the National Football League (NFL). He played college football for the Central Michigan Chippewas and was signed by the Cincinnati Bengals as an undrafted free agent.

== Early life and college ==
While attending Charlotte High School in Charlotte, Michigan, Gutierrez won All-State honors in football and wrestling.

Attending Central Michigan University as a history major, Gutierrez was a three-year starter at center for the Chippewas football team. As a junior, he led his team to the 1994 Mid-American Conference (MAC) title. He was on the All-MAC first-team as a senior in 1995.

== Professional career ==
Gutierrez signed with the Cincinnati Bengals as an undrafted free agent following the 1996 NFL draft. With five appearances off the bench, he had his first regular season game action in 1997 with the Bengals. In 1998, Gutierrez was waived on August 30, re-signed on November 4, and waived again on November 17. He then signed with the Jacksonville Jaguars practice squad November 30 before returning to the Bengals on December 15 and appearing in one game that season. He remained with the Bengals until 2002. He later played for the San Francisco 49ers from 2003 to 2004 and Detroit Lions in 2005. In his career, Gutierrez played a total of 114 games with 23 starts.
