= Marshall High School (Michigan) =

High school in Marshall, Michigan

Location
- 701 North Marshall Avenue; Marshall, Michigan 49068; United States; 42°17′9″N 84°57′25″W

Information
- Type: Public High School
- Established: Fall 1908
- School district: Marshall Public Schools
- Superintendent: Rebecca Jones
- Principal: Mathew Siebert
- Teaching staff: 37.90 (on an FTE basis)
- Grades: 9–12
- Enrollment: 769 (2023-2024)
- Student to teacher ratio: 20.29
- Colors: Red and black
- Athletics conference: Interstate 8 Athletic Conference
- Nickname: Redhawks
- Rivals: Harper Creek
- Website: mhs.marshallpublicschools.org

Student assessments
- 2021–22 school year Change vs. prior year

M-STEP 11th grade proficiency rates (Science / Social Studies)
- Advanced %: 7.6 / 7.0
- Proficient %: 19.1 / 14.7
- PR. Proficient %: 9.2 / 50.4
- Not Proficient %: 64.1 / 27.9

Average test scores
- SAT Total: 972.2 (▼ −29.3)

Marshall High School is a high school in the Marshall Public Schools District in Marshall, Michigan.

== Athletics ==
The Marshall Redhawks competes in the Interstate 8 Athletic Conference. The school colors are red and black. The following Michigan High School Athletic Association (MHSAA) sanctioned sports are offered:

- Baseball (boys)
- Basketball (girls and boys)
  - Boys state champion - 1944
  - Girls state champion - 2016
- Bowling (girls and boys)
- Cross country (girls and boys)
  - Boys state champion - 1981
- Football (boys)
  - State champion - 1996, 2009
- Golf (girls and boys)
  - Boys state champion - 1968, 1996
- Soccer (girls and boys)
- Softball (girls)
- Swim and dive (girls and boys)
- Tennis (girls and boys)
- Track (girls and boys)
- Volleyball (girls)
- Wrestling (boys)
