= John Knauf =

American judge

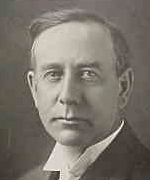

Justice of the North Dakota Supreme Court
- In office 1906

Judge of the Stutsman County Courts
- Appointed by: Elmore Y. Sarles
- Preceded by: Newton C. Young
- Succeeded by: Charles J. Fisk

Personal details
- Born: April 5, 1868 Waterloo, Michigan
- Died: September 19, 1952 (aged 84)
- Education: University of Michigan Law School

John Knauf (April 5, 1868 – September 19, 1952) was an American judge who served as a justice of the Supreme Court of North Dakota in 1906. He died in 1952 at age 84.

== Early life and education ==
Knauf was born in Waterloo, Michigan, on April 5, 1868. When he was young, his parents died and along with his brothers and sisters he moved to Stutsman County, North Dakota, in 1883. Knauf was educated in the school system of Jamestown, North Dakota. For higher education, he spent one year at Jamestown College and one year at St. John's University in Collegeville, Minnesota, before enrolling at the University of Michigan School of Law where he received a law degree in 1892.

== Legal and judicial career ==
After receiving his law degree, Knauf was admitted to practice law in the state of Michigan. He was admitted to the North Dakota Bar in 1893 and thereafter opened a legal office in Jamestown. While in Jamestown, he served for a time as a Stutsman County judge.

In 1906, a 38-year-old Knauf was appointed to the North Dakota Supreme Court, filling the seat vacated by the retirement of Newton C. Young. Knauf was defeated in the general election to a full term in the seat later that year.

After leaving the Supreme Court, Knauf returned to private legal practice in Jamestown. He died on September 19, 1952, at the age of 84.
