= Northwest Community Schools =

School district in Michigan

Address
- 6900 Rives Junction Road Jackson, Jackson County, Michigan, 49201; United States

District information
- Motto: The direction of greatness
- Grades: Pre-Kindergarten-12
- Superintendent: Geoff Bontrager, Ed.S.
- Schools: 5
- Budget: $48,507,000 2022–2023 expenditures
- NCES District ID: 2626010

Students and staff
- Students: 3,507 (2024–2025)
- Teachers: 197.25 (on an FTE basis) (2024–2025)
- Staff: 501.14 FTE (2024–2025)
- Student–teacher ratio: 17.78 (2024-2025)

Other information
- Website: www.nwschools.org

Northwest Community Schools is a public school district in Jackson County, Michigan. It serves parts of the following townships: Blackman, Henrietta, Rives, Sandstone, and Tompkins. It also serves parts of Leslie Township and Onondaga Township in Ingham County.

== History ==
Several small school districts northwest of Jackson consolidated in 1954 to form the Northwest Community Schools, then known as Northwest School District. Without a high school of its own, the new district continued to send high school students to Jackson High School and Springport High School.

In 1955, citizens in the district voted to build a high school, which opened in fall, 1957. That building became the middle school when the current high school opened on the same campus in 1968. The architect was Commonwealth Associates.

== Schools ==
Schools in Northwest Community Schools district
School	Address	Notes
Northwest Early Elementary	3735 Lansing Avenue, Jackson	Grades PreK-2
Northwest Elementary	3757 Lansing Avenue, Jackson	Grades 3–5
Northwest Kidder Middle School	6700 Rives Junction Road, Jackson	Grades 6–8. Built 1957.
Northwest High School	4200 Van Horn Road, Jackson	Grades 9–12. Built 1968.
Northwest Connect	6900 Rives Junction Road, Jackson	Alternative high school
