= Alan Haller =

American football player (born 1970)

No. 21, 20, 28, 24
- Position: Defensive back

Personal information
- Born: August 9, 1970 (age 56); Lansing, Michigan, U.S.
- Listed height: 5 ft 11 in (1.80 m)
- Listed weight: 186 lb (84 kg)

Career information
- High school: J. W. Sexton (Lansing, Michigan)
- College: Michigan State
- NFL draft: 1992: 5th round, 123rd overall pick

Career history

Playing
- Pittsburgh Steelers (1992); Cleveland Browns (1992); Pittsburgh Steelers (1993); Carolina Panthers (1995)

Operations
- Michigan State (2021–2025) Athletic director

Career NFL statistics
- Games: 12
- Stats at Pro Football Reference

Alan Glenn Haller (born August 9, 1970) is an American college athletic administrator and former football player. He was previously the athletic director at Michigan State University, a position he held from September 2021 to May 2025. Haller's 2022 salary was $800,000. Haller played professionally as a defensive back in the National Football League (NFL) with the Pittsburgh Steelers, Cleveland Browns and Carolina Panthers. He was selected in the fifth round of the 1992 NFL draft by the Steelers. He played his first three games in the NFL with the Steelers before he was released and signed with the Cleveland Browns, where he played another three games. He returned to the Steelers in 1993 and joined the expansion Carolina Panthers in 1995 before retiring after the 1995 season. In his professional career, Haller played only 12 games in three seasons, earning no starts and no statistics. Though he was a defensive back, Haller played mostly as a special teams player.

After retiring from the NFL, Haller returned to Michigan State University and became a police officer with the Michigan State University Department of Police and Public Safety. He spent 13 years on the force, eventually working his way up to 1st Lieutenant of the Uniform Division. In 2006, Haller, along with athletic director Mark Hollis, men's basketball coach Tom Izzo, and former athletic director Ron Mason, was a member of the selection team that brought head football coach Mark Dantonio to Michigan State.

In June 2010, Haller was named associate athletics director for administration for the Michigan State athletic department. He was the human resource officer for the athletics department and the student-athlete ombudsman.

== College football career ==
Haller attended Michigan State after attending J. W. Sexton High School in Lansing, Michigan. While in high school, Haller rushed for 1,245 yards and 14 touchdowns as a senior. He earned a scholarship to Michigan State and was converted into a defensive back by Spartans head coach George Perles. He was a three-year starter at both corner and safety. In 1991, he won the Co-Captains award for leadership. Haller finished his college career with three interceptions.

== NFL career ==
Haller was drafted by the Pittsburgh Steelers in the fifth round of the 1992 NFL draft. Though he made the team, he mainly played special teams, and was placed on waivers on November 17, 1992. The Cleveland Browns claimed Haller off waivers and like in Pittsburgh, Haller played mostly special teams. Less than a month after joining the Browns, Haller was injured and placed on Injured Reserved. The Browns released Haller in 1993 and he spent all of 1994 out of pro football. He later signed with the expansion Carolina Panthers, appearing in just two games. The Panthers released Haller in camp the following summer, essentially ending his NFL career.

== Career after football ==
On September 1, 2021, Haller was named the athletic director at Michigan State University. Haller was the 20th athletic director in the school's history at that time. He had just prior served as the assistant vice president and deputy athletic director for Michigan State athletics.

Michigan State University announced in May 2025 that Alan Haller is no longer serving as vice president and director of intercollegiate athletics, effective May 11, 2025.

Prior to his tenure in the MSU Athletic Department, Haller was a police officer with the Michigan State University Police Department for 13 years.

== Personal life ==
Haller graduated from Michigan State with a B.A. in criminal justice and after his rookie season, he spent time as an intern in the Cleveland district attorney's office. He has two sons, Devin and Blake, and a daughter Allison.
