= Portage River (Jackson County, Michigan) =

Tributary of the Grand River in Michigan, United States

Location
- Country: United States

Physical characteristics
- Source
  - location: Waterloo Township, Jackson County, Michigan
- Mouth
  - location: Grand River in Blackman Charter Township, Jackson County, Michigan
  - elevation: 909 feet (277 m)
- Length: 15.5 mi (24.9 km)
- Discharge
  - location: mouth
  - average: 148.54 cu ft/s (4.206 m^{3}/s) (estimate)

The Portage River is a 15.5-mile-long (24.9 km) river in the U.S. state of Michigan, flowing mostly southwesterly through northeast Jackson County.

The Portage River rises at approximately 42°22′26″N 84°10′48″W in the Portage Lake Swamp in the Waterloo State Recreation Area. The river flows mostly southwest into the Grand River at 42°18′54″N 84°23′42″W in Blackman Charter Township just north of the city of Jackson. The Portage River forms the boundary between the townships of Henrietta and Leoni.

== Drainage basin ==
The Portage River drains all or portions of the following administrative divisions:

- Ingham County
  - Bunker Hill Township
  - Ingham Township
  - Stockbridge Township
- Jackson County
  - Blackman Charter Township
  - Grass Lake Township
  - Henrietta Township
  - Leoni Township
  - Waterloo Township
- Washtenaw County
  - Lyndon Township
  - Sylvan Township

== Named tributaries ==
From the mouth:

- (right) Wildcat Creek
  - Brill Lake
- (right) outflow from
  - St. John Lake
  - Eagle Lake
  - Mud Lake
- (left) Batteese Creek
  - Batteese Lake
  - Hewes Lake
- (left) Orchard Creek
  - (left) Cahaogan Creek
  - (right) Thornapple Creek
    - (left) Pickett Drain
      - Standish Lake
    - (right) Jacobs Lake Drain
      - Jacobs Lake
- (right) outflow from Portage Lake
- Little Portage Lake
  - (right) outflow from series of lakes and small streams including
    - Locker Lake
    - Riley Lake
    - Notten Lake
    - Lehman Lake
  - (left) Honey Creek
  - Portage Lake Swamp
