= Henrietta Township, Michigan =

- Civil township
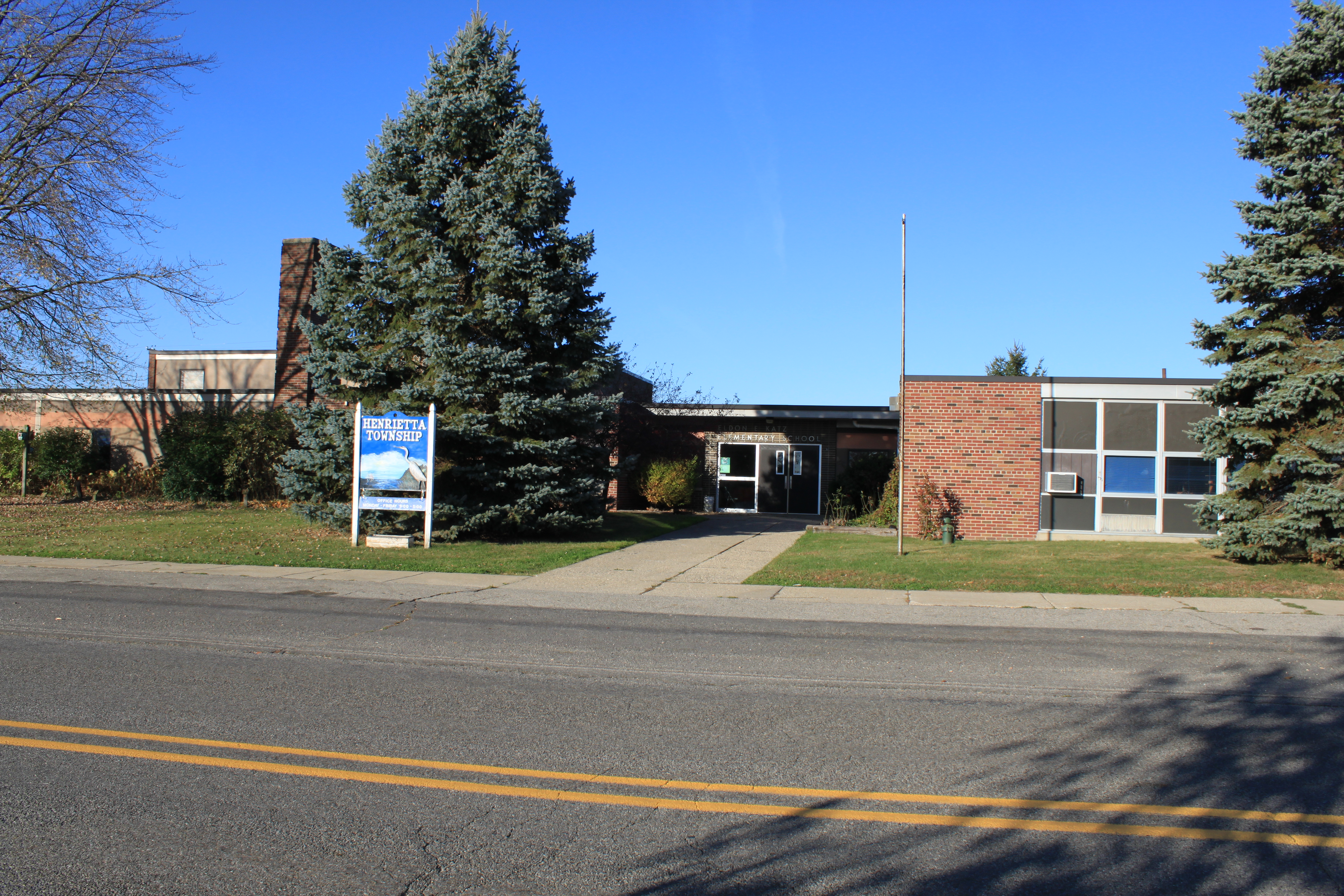
- Henrietta Township Office and Eldon E. Katz Elementary School

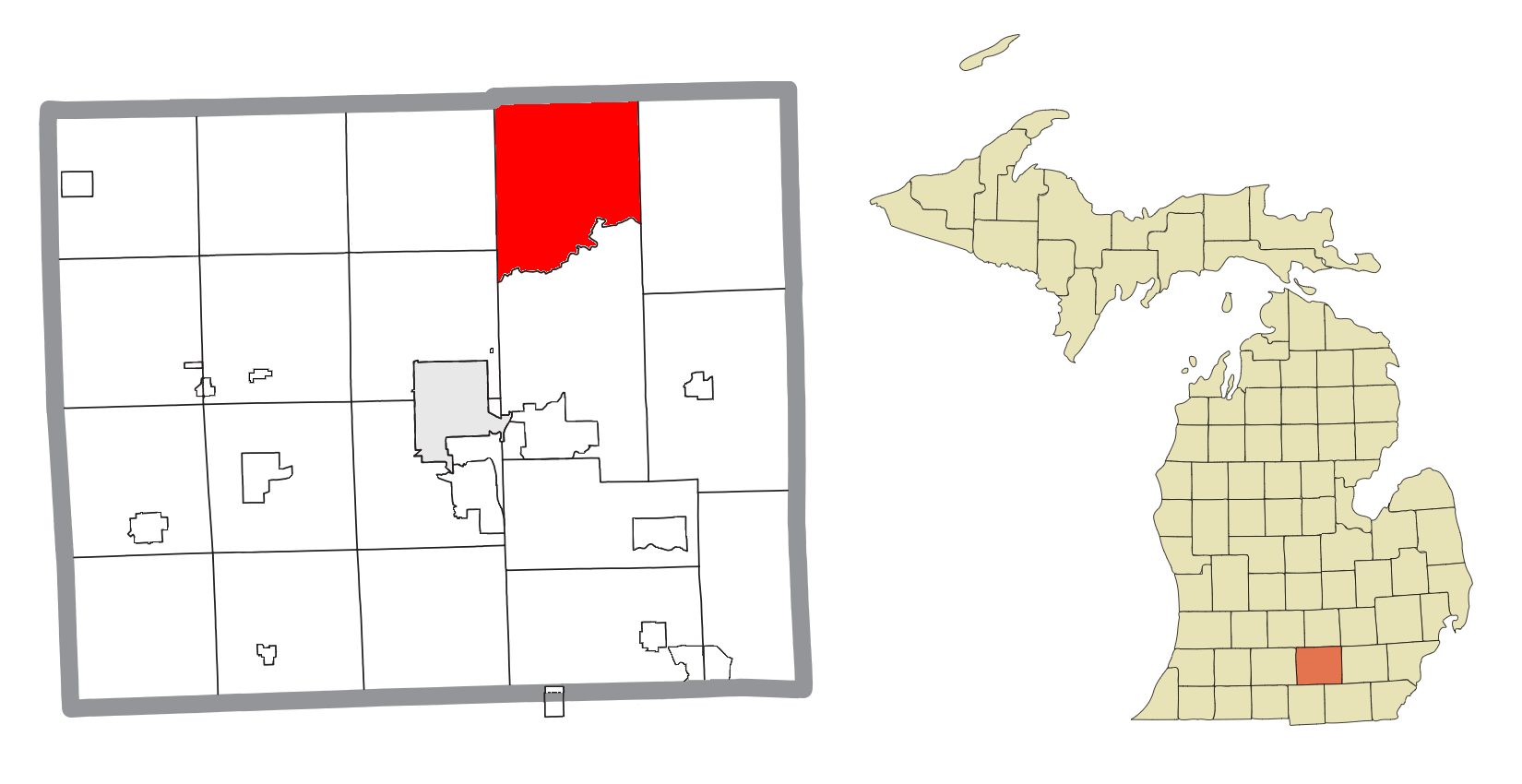
- Location within Jackson County

- Location within the state of Michigan Henrietta Township (the United States)
- Coordinates: 42°23′00″N 84°18′52″W
- Country: United States
- State: Michigan
- County: Jackson
- Established: 1837

Government
  - Supervisor: Andy Grimes
  - Clerk: Sally Keene

Area
  - Total: 37.05 sq mi (96.0 km^{2})
  - Land: 35.98 sq mi (93.2 km^{2})
  - Water: 1.07 sq mi (2.8 km^{2})
- Elevation: 938 ft (286 m)

Population (2020)
  - Total: 4,673
  - Density: 129.9/sq mi (50.15/km^{2})
- Time zone: UTC-5 (Eastern (EST))
  - Summer (DST): UTC-4 (EDT)
- ZIP code(s): 49201 (Jackson); 49259 (Munith); 49272 (Pleasant Lake); 49285 (Stockbridge)
- Area code: 517
- FIPS code: 26-37700
- GNIS feature ID: 1626465
- Website: Official website

Henrietta Township is a civil township of Jackson County in the U.S. state of Michigan. The population was 4,673 at the 2020 census.

== History ==
Jean Baptiste Berard (also spelled Boreaux by descendants) claimed to have settled here in 1816 and had established a trading post in 1831. Nearby Batteese Lake and Batteese Creek were named after him, as his name was also commonly written as "Battise" by other early settlers. The township was organized in 1837 with the name "West Portage". In 1839, Henry Hurd had the town renamed "Henrietta", after his home town of Henrietta, New York. A post office named "Portage" opened on May 21, 1838, with John Davidson as the first postmaster. The name changed to "West Portage" on December 14, 1838, and then to "Henrietta" on May 13, 1840. The post office was discontinued on December 14, 1903. Another post office, named "South Henrietta", opened on September 5, 1851, with Henry Hurd as the first postmaster, and was succeeded by William D. Martin on May 10, 1853. The office continued until December 21, 1866.

== Communities ==
- Henrietta Station is a mostly historical locale in the southeastern part of the township on Coon Hill Road at 42°21′48″N 84°17′10″W. It was a stop on the Western Jackson branch of the Grand Trunk Western Railroad.
- Pleasant Lake is an unincorporated community at the junction of N. Meridian Road and E. Berry Road at 42°22′48″N 84°20′57″W, just south of the lake of the same name. The lake was known as Spring Lake until John Wenstren purchased 1,800 acres (7.3 km^{2}) of land adjoining the lake in 1836. A village named Pleasant Lake was platted in 1868, but never incorporated. A post office opened on October 13, 1961, with Leo E. Osterberg as the first postmaster. The ZIP code for the post office in 49272.
- Munith is a small unincorporated community on M-106 on the boundary between Waterloo and Henrietta townships. The Munith post office with ZIP code 49259 also serves portions of Henrietta Township.
- Roots is an unincorporated community on Root Station Road between Jordon and Wooster roads at 42°20′08″N 84°19′20″W, Roots was a station on the Western Jackson branch of the Grand Trunk Western Railroad. A post office named "Tanner" was established there on April 14, 1884. The name changed to "Roots" on September 11, 1885, then to "Valley Villa" on December 20, 1885, and the name of Roots was restored on March 1, 1890. The office was discontinued on November 14, 1904.

== Geography ==
According to the United States Census Bureau, the township has a total area of 37.05 square miles (95.96 km^{2}), of which 35.98 square miles (93.19 km^{2}) is land and 1.07 square miles (2.77 km^{2}) (2.89%) is water.

It is drained by tributaries of the Portage River, which runs along the township's southern boundary and is part of the Grand River watershed.

A portion of Meridian-Baseline State Park is located within Henrietta Township.

== Demographics ==
As of the census of 2000, there were 4,483 people, 1,614 households, and 1,276 families residing in the township. The population density was 123.7 inhabitants per square mile (47.8/km^{2}). There were 1,753 housing units at an average density of 48.4 per square mile (18.7/km^{2}). The racial makeup of the township was 97.50% White, 0.42% African American, 0.49% Native American, 0.09% Asian, 0.07% Pacific Islander, 0.76% from other races, and 0.67% from two or more races. Hispanic or Latino of any race were 1.85% of the population.

There were 1,614 households, out of which 37.2% had children under the age of 18 living with them, 66.5% were married couples living together, 8.1% had a female householder with no husband present, and 20.9% were non-families. 16.3% of all households were made up of individuals, and 5.4% had someone living alone who was 65 years of age or older. The average household size was 2.76 and the average family size was 3.07.

In the township the population was spread out, with 27.3% under the age of 18, 7.7% from 18 to 24, 31.3% from 25 to 44, 24.1% from 45 to 64, and 9.5% who were 65 years of age or older. The median age was 36 years. For every 100 females, there were 103.7 males. For every 100 females age 18 and over, there were 103.3 males.

The median income for a household in the township was $48,517, and the median income for a family was $55,265. Males had a median income of $38,454 versus $26,079 for females. The per capita income for the township was $19,904. About 1.3% of families and 3.3% of the population were below the poverty line, including 3.2% of those under age 18 and none of those age 65 or over.
