= Capital Area Activities Conference =

High school sports league in Michigan, US

- Founded: 2003
- No. of teams: 21
- Country: United States
- Website: http://caacsports.org/

The Capital Area Activities Conference (Or CAAC) is a high school sports league based in the Lansing area of Michigan. The conference is a member of the Michigan High School Athletic Association (MHSAA). There are currently 21 member schools in the conference that come from the counties of Clinton, Eaton, Ingham, Ionia, and Livingston. The Capital Area Activities Conference Logo was designed by Lansing Catholic 2003 graduate Raymond B. Corey.

== Member schools ==
The CAAC currently has 21 member schools:

Team	Class	Enrollment	Joined	City	County	Previous Conference
Blue Division
DeWitt Panthers	A	945	2003	DeWitt	Clinton	Ingham County League
East Lansing Trojans	A	1225	2003	East Lansing	Ingham	Capital Area Conference
Grand Ledge Comets	A	1760	2003	Grand Ledge	Eaton	Capital Area Conference
Holt Rams	A	1430	2003	Delhi Township	Ingham	Capital Area Conference
Lansing Everett Vikings	A	1077	2003	Lansing	Ingham	Capital Area Conference
Lansing Waverly Warriors	A	954	2003	Delta Township	Eaton	Capital Area Conference
Okemos Wolves	A	1499	2003	Meridian Township	Ingham	Capital Circuit League
Red Division
Fowlerville Gladiators	B	714	2003	Fowlerville	Livingston	Ingham County League
Haslett Vikings	B	754	2003	Meridian Township	Ingham	Ingham County League
Lansing Eastern Quakers	A	1049	2003	Lansing	Ingham	Capital Area Conference
Mason Bulldogs	A	975	2003	Mason	Ingham	Capital Circuit League
St. Johns Redwings	B	758	2005	St. Johns	Clinton	Independent
Williamston Hornets	B	598	2003	Williamston	Ingham	Ingham County League
White Division
Charlotte Orioles	B	698	2003 & 2017	Charlotte	Eaton	Independent
Eaton Rapids Greyhounds	B	607	2003	Eaton Rapids	Eaton	Capital Circuit League
Ionia Bulldogs	B	715	2003	Ionia	Ionia	Mid-Michigan Athletic Conference
Lansing Catholic Cougars	B	393	2003	Lansing	Ingham	Capital Circuit League
Lansing Sexton J-Dubbs	B	601	2003	Lansing	Ingham	Capital Area Conference
Olivet Eagles	B	375	2023	Olivet	Eaton	Greater Lansing Athletic Conference
Lakewood Vikings	B	487	2003 & 2023	Lake Odessa	Ionia	Greater Lansing Athletic Conference
Portland Raiders	B	580	2007	Portland	Ionia	Mid-Michigan Athletic Conference - B

- Note: The class and population size are from the 2026-27 MHSAA listings

=== Former members ===
School	City	County	Joined	Previous Conference	Departed	Successive Conference
Corunna Cavaliers	Corunna	Shiawasse	2007	Mid-Michigan B	2014	Genesee Area Conference
Jackson Vikings	Jackson	Jackson	2003	Capital Area Conference	2018	Southeastern Conference
Jackson Lumen Christi Titans	Summit Township	Jackson	2012	Southern Michigan Athletic Conference	2014	Interstate 8 Athletic Conference
Jackson Northwest Mounties	Jackson	Jackson	2003	Capital Circuit League	2014	Interstate 8 Athletic Conference
Owosso Trojans	Owosso	Shiawasse	2007	Big Nine Conference	2017	Flint Metro League
Parma Western Panthers	Parma	Jackson	2012	Southern Michigan Athletic Conference	2014	Interstate 8 Athletic Conference
Perry Ramblers	Perry	Shiawasse	2007	Mid-Michigan B	2012	Genesee Area Conference
Stockbridge Panthers	Stockbridge	Ingham	2012	Southern Michigan	2014	Greater Lansing Athletic Conference

== Sports ==
The CAAC sponsor many sports for high school athletes during the fall, winter, and spring seasons.

Fall:

- Cross Country (Boys & Girls)
- Football
- Golf (Girls)
- Soccer (Boys)
- Swimming & Diving (Girls)
- Tennis (Boys)
- Volleyball

Winter:

- Basketball (Boys & Girls)
- Bowling (Boys & Girls)
- Competitive Cheer
- Gymnastics
- Swimming & Diving (Boys)
- Wrestling

Spring:

- Baseball
- Golf (Boys)
- Lacrosse (Boys & Girls)
- Soccer (Girls)
- Softball
- Tennis (Girls)
- Track & Field (Boys & Girls)

== History ==
The CAAC was created in 2003, consisting of 21 schools coming from the now defunct leagues of the Capital Area Conference, the Capital Circuit League, the Ingham County League, and the Mid-Michigan Athletic Conference. From 2003 to 2007 the conference was made up of three divisions (I, II, III): Division I was made up of eight schools, Division II was made up of seven schools, and Division III was made up of six schools. At the start of the 2007–08 school year, the league switched from Roman numeral-based divisions, to color-based divisions (Blue, Gold, Red, and White), due to new schools joining the league.

The 2012–13 season was when the league reached its peak number of schools in the league; the league consisted of 27 schools with the same Blue, Gold, Red, White Divisions. After two years of competition of 27 schools, the league went through major re-alignment after seven schools departed the league. Lakewood and Stockbridge left the CAAC, and created a new conference with five other Lansing area schools, called the Greater Lansing Athletic Conference (GLAC). Jackson area schools: Jackson Northwest, Parma Western, Jackson Lumen Christi, plus Charlotte left the conference and created the Interstate Eight Conference. Corunna made the decision to move east and join the Flint-based Genesee Area Conference (GAC). The CAAC reduced to three divisions and eliminated the Gold Division. Currently the Blue Division has seven schools, the Red has six, and the White has eight. The 2017–18 school year, the CAAC experienced a minor change. Owosso departed the league and joined the Flint Metro League. Former league member Charlotte, which was one of the seven schools that departed the league a few years prior, joined the CAAC once again, replacing Owosso in the Red Division.

The 2018–19 school year, the CAAC went through re-alignment once again. DeWitt and Lansing Waverly joined the Blue, with East Lansing, Grand Ledge, Holt, Lansing Everett, and Okemos. In the Red, Fowlerville, Lansing Eastern and Williamston joined Haslett, Mason, and St. Johns. Charlotte and Lansing Sexton moved to the White with Eaton Rapids, Ionia, Lansing Catholic, and Portland. Jackson High School departed the league and joined the Ann Arbor based Southeastern Conference (SEC). In 2023 Lakewood rejoined the conference returning to the White Division along with Olivet, joining for the first time. Both schools came from the GLAC.

== Rainbow Divisions ==
Bowling
Blue	White
East Lansing	Charlotte
DeWitt	Eaton Rapids
Fowlerville	Ionia
Grand Ledge	Lakewood
Haslett	Lansing Catholic
Holt	Lansing United (Eastern, Everett, Sexton)
Mason	Olivet
Okemos (Boys only)	Portland

Competitive Cheer
Red	White
DeWitt	Charlotte
Grand Ledge	Eaton Rapids
Holt	Fowlerville
Lansing Waverly	Lakewood
Mason	Lansing Catholic
Okemos	Portland
St. Johns	Williamston

Gymnastics
One Division
East Lansing (co-op with DeWitt)
Fowlerville (co-op with Byron, Perry & Pinckney)
Grand Ledge
Haslett (co-op with Bath, St. Johns & Williamston)
Holt (co-op with Dansville & Mason)

Lacrosse
One Division
Grand Ledge
DeWitt
Lansing Waverly (co-op with Lansing Catholic)
Haslett
East Lansing
Holt
Okemos
St. Johns (co-op with Ovid-Elsie)

Swimming and Diving
Blue	Red
DeWitt	Charlotte
East Lansing	Eaton Rapids
Grand Ledge	Ionia
Haslett	Lansing United (Eastern, Everett, Sexton)
Holt	Lansing Waverly (co-op with Lansing Catholic)
Mason	Williamston (co-op with Lansing Christian)
Okemos	
St. Johns	
