= Greater Lansing Athletic Conference =

Sports league

Greater Lansing Activities Conference
- Founded: 2014
- Folded: 2023
- No. of teams: 7
- Country: United States

The Greater Lansing Activities Conference was a MHSAA athletic conference formed in 2014 by seven teams from the Lansing area including Ingham, Eaton, Barry, and Shiawassee Counties. The 7 founding members of the conference were Lansing Christian, Perry, Olivet, Lakewood, Leslie, Maple Valley and Stockbridge. The conference collapsed in 2023 with Olivet and Lakewood joining the Capital Area Activities Conference, Lansing Christian and Perry joining the Central Michigan Athletic Conference, Leslie joining the Cascade Conference, and Maple Valley joining the Big 8 Conference. Stockbridge would be the only school left without a conference becoming Independent prior to joining Maple Valley in the Big 8 in 2024.
