= Bronson Jr./Sr. High School =

Location
- 450 E. Grant Street; Bronson, Michigan 49028; United States; 41°52′05″N 85°11′10″W

Information
- School district: Bronson Community Schools
- Superintendent: Kate Wall
- Principal: Mike Miller
- Teaching staff: 25.00 (FTE)
- Grades: 6-12
- Enrollment: 523 (2023–2024)
- Average class size: 20
- Student to teacher ratio: 20.92
- Colors: Purple and gold
- Nickname: Vikings

Bronson Jr./Sr. High School is a public school located in Bronson, Michigan. It serves grades 6–12. It is a part of the Branch Intermediate School District.

== History ==
Bronson Jr./Sr. High School was built in 1964. At first it accommodated grades 9–12. In 1980 the school made a transfer of 7th–8th graders from Bronson Middle School (which later became Chicago Street School). In 1998 a science/technology addition was built and completed, and in 2002 a weight and wrestling/all-purpose room was added.

=== Present Day ===
Currently, the school provides education for students from sixth grade to twelfth grade. Students from the school can go to the Branch Area Career Center part-time if they are a Junior or a Senior.

== Athletics ==
Bronson is a Class C school and a member of the Big 8 Conference. Sports offered include tennis, track, basketball, golf, volleyball, wrestling, softball, baseball, cheerleading, and football.
