= Northwest High School (Michigan) =

Location
- 4700 Van Horn Road; Jackson, Michigan 49201; United States
- Coordinates: 42°19′48″N 84°28′07″W

Information
- Type: Public secondary school
- Established: 1954
- School district: Northwest Community Schools
- Superintendent: Geoff Bontrager
- Principal: Scott Buchler
- Teaching staff: 48.60 (on an FTE basis)
- Grades: 9-12
- Enrollment: 954 (2023-2024)
- Student to teacher ratio: 19.63
- Campus: Rural
- Colors: Red and black
- Athletics conference: Interstate 8 Athletic Conference
- Nickname: Mounties
- Website: nwhs.nwschools.org

Northwest High School is a public high school in Jackson, Michigan, United States. It serves grades 9-12 for the Northwest Community Schools district.

== Demographics ==
The demographic breakdown of the 906 students enrolled for 2017-18 was:

- Male - 50.9%
- Female - 49.1%
- Asian - 0.7%
- Black - 3.4%
- Hispanic - 4.3%
- Native Hawaiian/Pacific islanders - 0.5%
- White - 85.5%
- Multiracial - 5.6%

43.8% of the students were eligible for free or reduced-cost lunch.

== Athletics ==
The Northwest Mounties compete in the Interstate 8 Athletic Conference. Red and black are the school colors. The following Michigan High School Athletic Association (MHSAA) sports are offered:

- Baseball (boys)
- Basketball (girls and boys)
- Bowling (girls and boys)
  - Girls state champion - 2013
  - Boys state champion—2020
- Competitive cheerleading (girls)
- Cross country (girls and boys)
- Football (boys)
- Golf (girls and boys)
- Gymnastics (girls)
- Ice hockey (boys)
- Soccer (girls and boys)
- Softball (girls)
- Tennis (girls and boys)
- Track and field (girls and boys)
- Volleyball (girls)
- Wrestling (boys)
