= Harper Creek High School =

Location
- 12677 Beadle Lake Road; Battle Creek, Michigan 49014; United States; 42.2559°N 85.1522°W

Information
- Type: Public High School
- Established: 1949
- Principal: Dennis Anthony
- Teaching staff: 44.44 (FTE)
- Grades: 9-12
- Enrollment: 823 (2024-2025)
- Student to teacher ratio: 18.52
- Colors: Royal blue and white
- Mascot: Beavers
- District: Harper Creek Community Schools
- Website: www.harpercreek.net/schools/high-school/

Harper Creek High School is a high school in the Harper Creek Community Schools located just outside the city of Battle Creek, Michigan. In 2005, Harper Creek opened a new high school, which includes computer labs, electronic lockers (removed 2017), overhead projectors in all rooms, a gymnasium with three basketball courts, an 850-seat auditorium and an eight-lane swimming pool, as well as a bowling alley in the basement.

== Extracurricular activities ==
There are many extracurricular activities available to students at Harper Creek High School.

=== Quiz Bowl ===
In 2003, the Harper Creek Quiz Bowl team won the Class B State Championship and advanced to a national tournament.

=== Athletics ===
Harper Creek uses the Beaver as a mascot.

Harper Creek now competes in the Interstate 8 Athletic Conference.

Sports teams include:

- Boys' and Girls' swimming
- Boys' and Girls' cross country
- Boys' and Girls' tennis
- Boys' and Girls' soccer
- Wrestling
- Boys' and Girls' basketball
- Boys' and Girls' track

[Boys’ Track and Field state Champions 2024,2025]

- Boys' and Girls' golf
- Baseball
- Softball
- Football
- Cheerleading
- Dance
- Volleyball
- Lacrosse
- Bowling
