= Charlotte High School (Michigan) =

Location
- 378 State Street; Charlotte, Michigan 48813; United States
- Coordinates: 42°33′28″N 84°51′07″W

Information
- School district: Charlotte Public Schools
- Principal: Sean Barker
- Teaching staff: 29.74 (on an FTE basis)
- Grades: 9–12
- Enrollment: 666 (2023-2024)
- Student to teacher ratio: 22.39
- Colors: Orange and black
- Athletics conference: CAAC
- Nickname: Orioles
- Rivals: Eaton Rapids, Olivet
- Website: CHS website

Charlotte High School is a secondary school located in Charlotte, Michigan. It is administered by Charlotte Public Schools.

== Notable alumni ==
- Brock Gutierrez, NFL center
- For the Fallen Dreams, metalcore band
- Eric Menk, PBA Center and Power Forward

== Athletics ==
The Orioles compete as members of the Capital Area Activities Conference. The following MHSAA sanctioned sports are offered:

- Baseball (boys)
- Basketball (boys & girls)
- Bowling (boys & girls)
- Competitive cheer (girls)
- Cross country (boys & girls)
- Football (boys)
- Golf (boys & girls)
- Soccer (boys & girls)
- Softball (girls)
- Swimming and diving (boys & girls)
- Tennis (boys & girls)
- Track and field (boys & girls)
- Volleyball (girls)
- Wrestling (boys)
