= Brownlee Park, Michigan =

- Census-designated place (CDP) & unincorporated community
- Location of Brownlee Park, Michigan
- Coordinates: 42°19′32″N 85°8′8″W
- Country: United States
- State: Michigan
- County: Calhoun
- Township: Emmett, Pennfield

Area
  - Total: 2.05 sq mi (5.31 km^{2})
  - Land: 2.02 sq mi (5.24 km^{2})
  - Water: 0.031 sq mi (0.08 km^{2})
- Elevation: 876 ft (267 m)

Population (2020)
  - Total: 2,021
  - Density: 999.2/sq mi (385.78/km^{2})
- Time zone: UTC-5 (Eastern (EST))
  - Summer (DST): UTC-4 (EDT)
- FIPS code: 26-11200
- GNIS feature ID: 2393352

Brownlee Park is a census-designated place (CDP) in Calhoun County in the U.S. state of Michigan.The population was 2,021 at the 2020 census. The CDP is immediately east of the city of Battle Creek and is part of the Battle Creek Metropolitan Statistical Area.

The CDP includes both Brownlee Park and the adjacent community of Greenfield Park:

- Brownlee Park is within Emmett Charter Township, mostly east of Raymond Road and north of Michigan Avenue, at 42°19′08″N 85°08′33″W.
- Greenfield Park is mostly within Pennfield Charter Township, just north of Verona Road, centered on 42°20′06″N 85°08′14″W.

== Geography ==
According to the United States Census Bureau, the CDP has a total area of 2.03 square miles (5.27 km^{2}), of which 2.01 square miles (5.20 km^{2}) is land and 0.03 square miles (0.07 km^{2}), or 1.39%, is water.

== Demographics ==
=== Racial and ethnic composition ===
Brownlee Park, Michigan – Racial and ethnic composition Note: the US Census treats Hispanic/Latino as an ethnic category. This table excludes Latinos from the racial categories and assigns them to a separate category. Hispanics/Latinos may be of any race.
Race / Ethnicity (NH = Non-Hispanic)	Pop 2000	Pop 2010	Pop 2020	% 2000	% 2010	% 2020
White alone (NH)	2,309	1,853	1,705	89.22%	87.90%	84.36%
Black or African American alone (NH)	67	45	89	2.59%	2.13%	4.40%
Native American or Alaska Native alone (NH)	23	11	5	0.89%	0.52%	0.25%
Asian alone (NH)	17	9	1	0.66%	0.43%	0.05%
Native Hawaiian or Pacific Islander alone (NH)	2	2	0	0.08%	0.10%	0.00%
Other race alone (NH)	0	0	5	0.00%	0.00%	0.25%
Mixed race or Multiracial (NH)	61	72	128	2.36%	3.42%	6.33%
Hispanic or Latino (any race)	109	116	88	4.21%	5.50%	4.35%
Total	2,588	2,108	2,021	100.00%	100.00%	100.00%

Historical population
Census	Pop.	Note	%±
2010	2,108		—
2020	2,021		−4.1%
U.S. Decennial Census

=== 2020 census ===
As of the 2020 census, Brownlee Park had a population of 2,021. The median age was 38.1 years. 24.0% of residents were under the age of 18 and 12.3% of residents were 65 years of age or older. For every 100 females there were 106.4 males, and for every 100 females age 18 and over there were 102.2 males age 18 and over.

93.1% of residents lived in urban areas, while 6.9% lived in rural areas.

There were 805 households in Brownlee Park, of which 27.8% had children under the age of 18 living in them. Of all households, 30.8% were married-couple households, 26.5% were households with a male householder and no spouse or partner present, and 29.9% were households with a female householder and no spouse or partner present. About 32.5% of all households were made up of individuals and 12.7% had someone living alone who was 65 years of age or older.

There were 937 housing units, of which 14.1% were vacant. The homeowner vacancy rate was 1.4% and the rental vacancy rate was 15.9%.

=== 2000 census ===
As of the census of 2000, there were 2,588 people, 1,027 households, and 659 families residing in the CDP. The population density was 1,297.7 inhabitants per square mile (501.0/km^{2}). There were 1,194 housing units at an average density of 598.7 per square mile (231.2/km^{2}). The racial makeup of the CDP was 91.11% White, 2.70% Black or African American, 1.00% Native American, 0.66% Asian, 0.08% Pacific Islander, 1.51% from other races, and 2.94% from two or more races. Hispanic or Latino of any race were 4.21% of the population.

There were 1,027 households, out of which 32.3% had children under the age of 18 living with them, 39.5% were married couples living together, 19.8% had a female householder with no husband present, and 35.8% were non-families. 29.0% of all households were made up of individuals, and 10.1% had someone living alone who was 65 years of age or older. The average household size was 2.50 and the average family size was 3.05.

In the CDP, the population was spread out, with 27.7% under the age of 18, 9.4% from 18 to 24, 31.4% from 25 to 44, 20.9% from 45 to 64, and 10.5% who were 65 years of age or older. The median age was 34 years. For every 100 females, there were 90.4 males. For every 100 females age 18 and over, there were 87.7 males.

The median income for a household in the CDP was $26,694, and the median income for a family was $32,644. Males had a median income of $27,400 versus $20,813 for females. The per capita income for the CDP was $17,026. About 16.0% of families and 19.0% of the population were below the poverty line, including 30.3% of those under age 18 and 9.7% of those age 65 or over.

== Parks ==
Brownlee Park has direct access to the North Country Trail, which passes through the CDP via a mile long segment of crushed gravel pathway that is also a portion of the Calhoun County Trailway. The trail continues as sidewalk over the Veterans Memorial Bridge westward to interconnect with Battle Creek's Linear Park, and southward to the Ott Biological Preserve, lying just outside the CDP boundary. This portion of trail is also a segment of the Iron Belle Trail.

To the immediate West is Battle Creek's Bailey Park.

== Education ==
Brownlee Park is home to the Doris Klaussen Developmental Center, a school run by the Calhoun County ISD which serves special needs and disabled children.

== Infrastructure ==
At the extreme southern portion of Brownlee Park is Michigan State Highway 96. A large portion of a railyard operated by Canadian National lies on the west end of the CDP. Raymond Road, and Verona Road (which becomes Emmet Street entering Battle Creek), are notable examples of Stroads. Neither segment of road has pedestrian friendly infrastructure such as sidewalks or protected bike lanes despite connecting numerous subdivisions and three trailer parks to the rest of the community. Calhoun County is one of the few counties in the State of Michigan that does not have a county-level transit network. The nearest bus services and passenger trains operate within Battle Creek.
