= Waterloo Township, Michigan =

- Civil township
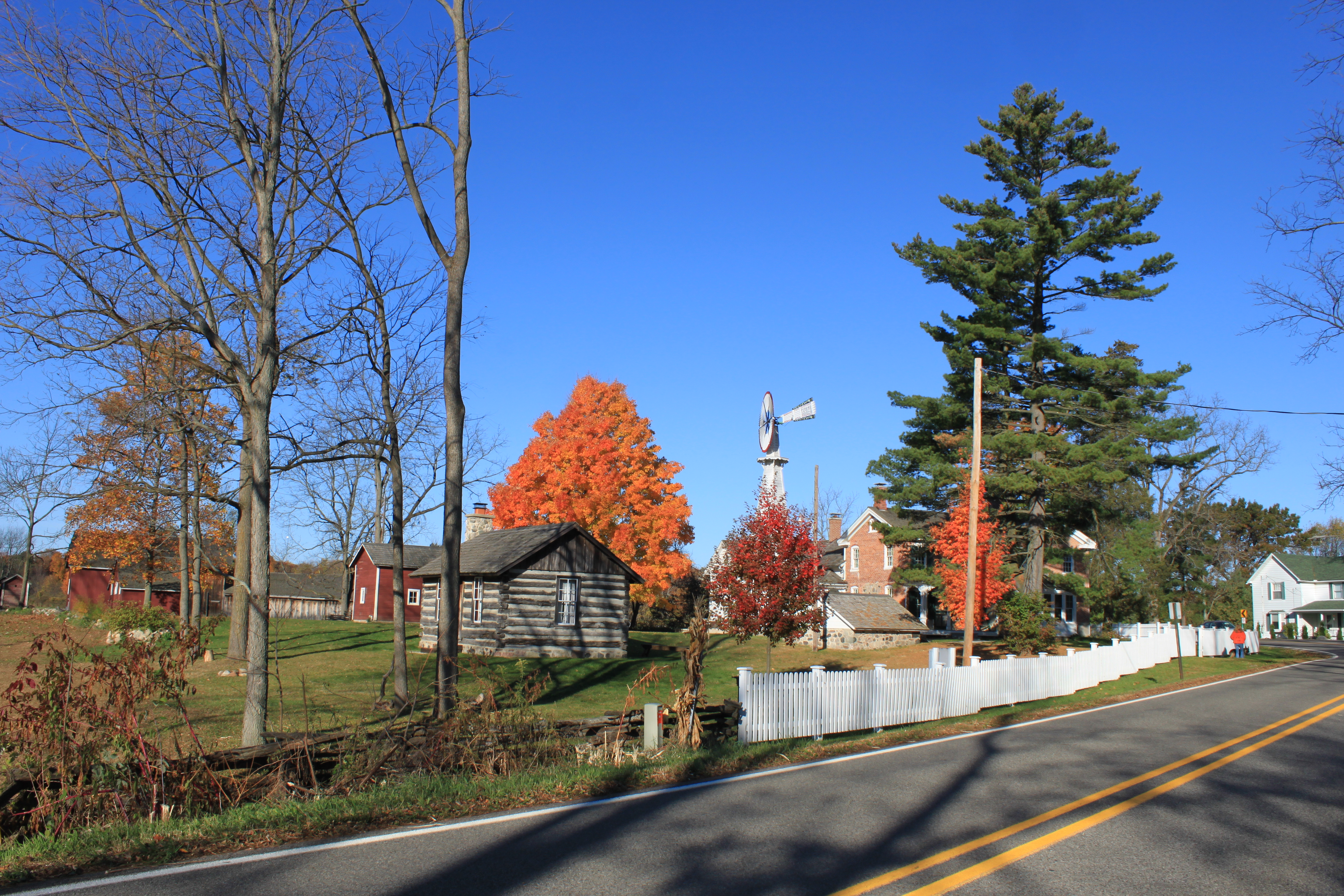
- Waterloo Farm Museum on Waterloo Munith Rd.

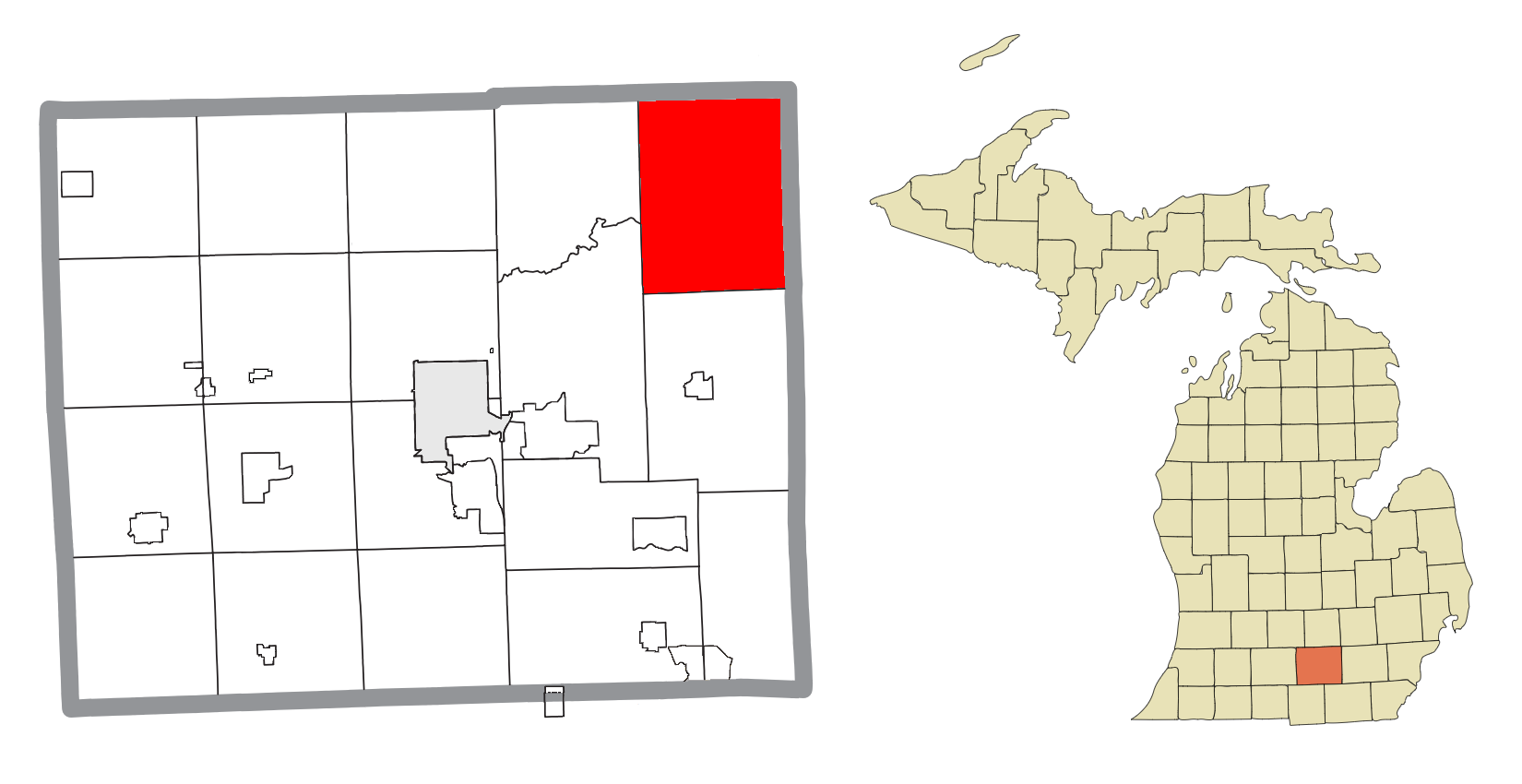
- Location within Jackson County

- Location within the state of Michigan Waterloo Township (the United States)
- Coordinates: 42°20′39″N 84°12′04″W
- Country: United States
- State: Michigan
- County: Jackson

Government
  - Supervisor: Douglas Lance
  - Clerk: Janice Kitley

Area
  - Total: 49.54 sq mi (128.3 km^{2})
  - Land: 47.62 sq mi (123.3 km^{2})
  - Water: 1.92 sq mi (5.0 km^{2})
- Elevation: 922 ft (281 m)

Population (2020)
  - Total: 2,931
  - Density: 61.55/sq mi (23.76/km^{2})
- Time zone: UTC-5 (Eastern (EST))
  - Summer (DST): UTC-4 (EDT)
- ZIP code(s): 49240 (Grass Lake); 49259 (Munith); 49285 (Stockbridge)
- Area code: 517
- FIPS code: 26-84300
- GNIS feature ID: 1627219
- Website: Official website

Waterloo Township is a civil township of Jackson County in the U.S. state of Michigan. The population was 2,931 at the 2020 census.

== Communities ==
Waterloo is an unincorporated community in the east part of the township.

== Geography ==
According to the United States Census Bureau, the township has a total area of 49.54 square miles (128.31 km^{2}), of which 47.62 square miles (123.34 km^{2}) is land and 1.92 square miles (4.97 km^{2}) (3.88%) is water.

The township occupies the northeast corner of Jackson County, bordered to the north by Ingham and Livingston counties, and to the east by Washtenaw County. It is 17 miles (27 km) northeast of Jackson, the county seat. The Portage River, a tributary of the Grand River, rises at the outlet of Mud Lake in the unincorporated community of Waterloo and flows west across the township.

== Demographics ==
As of the census of 2000, there were 3,069 people, 1,083 households, and 836 families residing in the township. The population density was 64.0 inhabitants per square mile (24.7/km^{2}). There were 1,383 housing units at an average density of 28.9 per square mile (11.2/km^{2}). The racial makeup of the township was 95.50% White, 2.87% African American, 0.42% Native American, 0.13% Asian, 0.36% from other races, and 0.72% from two or more races. Hispanic or Latino of any race were 0.72% of the population.

There were 1,083 households, out of which 36.1% had children under the age of 18 living with them, 64.3% were married couples living together, 8.1% had a female householder with no husband present, and 22.8% were non-families. 17.5% of all households were made up of individuals, and 5.2% had someone living alone who was 65 years of age or older. The average household size was 2.72 and the average family size was 3.07.

In the township the population was spread out, with 26.0% under the age of 18, 6.9% from 18 to 24, 33.8% from 25 to 44, 23.8% from 45 to 64, and 9.5% who were 65 years of age or older. The median age was 36 years. For every 100 females, there were 112.5 males. For every 100 females age 18 and over, there were 110.6 males.

The median income for a household in the township was $55,119, and the median income for a family was $57,351. Males had a median income of $44,306 versus $26,349 for females. The per capita income for the township was $22,609. About 4.6% of families and 3.2% of the population were below the poverty line, including 1.4% of those under age 18 and none of those age 65 or over.

== Notable individuals ==
Notable individuals that have lived in Waterloo Township include:

- John Knauf, justice of the North Dakota Supreme Court
