= Pennfield Charter Township, Michigan =

Pennfield Township, Michigan
- Charter township
- Pennfield Charter Township
- Location within the state of Michigan Location within the United States
- Coordinates: 42°21′40″N 85°8′28″W
- Country: United States
- State: Michigan
- County: Calhoun

Area
  - Total: 35.1 sq mi (90.9 km^{2})
  - Land: 34.2 sq mi (88.7 km^{2})
  - Water: 0.85 sq mi (2.2 km^{2})
- Elevation: 837 ft (255 m)

Population (2020)
  - Total: 8,781
  - Density: 256/sq mi (99.0/km^{2})
- Time zone: UTC-5 (Eastern (EST))
  - Summer (DST): UTC-4 (EDT)
- ZIP code(s): 49017
- Area code: 269
- FIPS code: 26-63440
- GNIS feature ID: 1626891
- Website: Official website

Pennfield Charter Township is a charter township of Calhoun County in the U.S. state of Michigan. It is part of the Battle Creek, Michigan Metropolitan Statistical Area. The population was 8,781 at the 2020 census. It contains part of the census-designated place of Brownlee Park.

== Geography ==
According to the United States Census Bureau, the township has a total area of 35.1 square miles (90.9 km^{2}), of which 34.2 square miles (88.7 km^{2}) is land and 0.85 square miles (2.2 km^{2}), or 2.38%, is water.

== Demographics ==
Historical population
Census	Pop.	Note	%±
1960	6,626		—
1970	8,290		25.1%
1980	8,743		5.5%
1990	8,386		−4.1%
2000	8,913		6.3%
2010	9,001		1.0%
2020	8,781		−2.4%
Source: Census Bureau. Census 1960- 2000, 2010.

As of the census of 2000, there were 8,913 people, 3,532 households, and 2,468 families residing in the township. The population density was 256.3 inhabitants per square mile (99.0/km^{2}). There were 3,764 housing units at an average density of 108.2 per square mile (41.8/km^{2}). The racial makeup of the township was 92.80% White, 4.35% African American, 0.47% Native American, 0.55% Asian, 0.03% Pacific Islander, 0.48% from other races, and 1.31% from two or more races. Hispanic or Latino of any race were 1.65% of the population.

There were 3,532 households, out of which 31.5% had children under the age of 18 living with them, 56.9% were married couples living together, 9.4% had a female householder with no husband present, and 30.1% were non-families. 25.5% of all households were made up of individuals, and 9.1% had someone living alone who was 65 years of age or older. The average household size was 2.52 and the average family size was 3.01.

In the township the population was spread out, with 25.2% under the age of 18, 7.9% from 18 to 24, 27.9% from 25 to 44, 25.9% from 45 to 64, and 13.2% who were 65 years of age or older. The median age was 39 years. For every 100 females, there were 96.7 males. For every 100 females age 18 and over, there were 93.4 males.

The median income for a household in the township was $44,277, and the median income for a family was $53,690. Males had a median income of $40,315 versus $27,318 for females. The per capita income for the township was $20,846. About 5.5% of families and 7.3% of the population were below the poverty line, including 8.4% of those under age 18 and 5.3% of those age 65 or over.

== Schools ==
- Pennfield High School - Enrollment 678 (2009), Grades 8-12
- Pennfield Middle School - Grades 5-7
- Dunlap Elementary - Grades 2-4
- North Pennfield Elementary - Grades K-1
