= Hanover-Horton School District =

School district in Michigan, United States

Address
- 10000 Moscow Road Horton, Jackson County, Michigan, 49246; United States

District information
- Grades: Pre-Kindergarten - 12
- Superintendent: Denise Bergstrom
- Schools: 3
- Budget: $16,156,000 2022-2023 expenditures
- NCES District ID: 2617640

Students and staff
- Students: 1,001 (2024-2025)
- Teachers: 53.76 (on an FTE basis) (2024-2025)
- Staff: 119.6 FTE (2024-2025)
- Student–teacher ratio: 18.62 (2024-2025)

Other information
- Website: www.hanoverhorton.org

Hanover-Horton School District is a public school district in Michigan. In Jackson County, it serves Hanover and parts of the townships of Hanover, Liberty, Pulaski, Spring Arbor, and Summit. In Hillsdale County, it serves parts of Moscow and Somerset townships.

== History ==
The first school in Hanover was established in 1839 in a log building. A two-story brick school was built in 1874, but it burned down on July 7, 1910.

Its replacement opened in fall 1911 at 195 Fairview Street. Known as the Old Hanover High School, it served as a school until 1962 and in 2012 was listed on the National Register of Historic Places. In 1934, a gymnasium addition (funded by the Works Progress Administration) was built with materials recycled from a church. Other additions were built in 1940 and 1948.

In 1945, the Hanover and Horton districts consolidated, along with several other small rural districts in the area. A new elementary school opened in the 1950s, and the current high school opened in January 1959. The old Hanover High School became a building for grades seven and eight, until they moved into an expanded area of the current high school in 1963. The old high school became a museum in 1977.

In 1974, overcrowding and a lack of revenue led the district to place middle and high school students on split-day schedules in the middle/high school building. High school students began the day at 6:55 AM, a chaotic transition occurred at noon, and middle school students did not leave until 6 PM. The crisis ended when a new middle school, attached to the high school, was built in 1980. "The entire school is designed for the special needs of the middle school student," noted the Jackson Citizen-Patriot. "Students will enter a warm-colored building of green, burnt orange and brown. The nature colors will hopefully create quiet as well as warmth. Specially placed sound panels and carpeting in classrooms will add to the quieting effect."

On November 6, 1997, the current elementary school was dedicated. A new gymnasium was built at the high school in 2020.

== Schools ==
Schools in Hanover-Horton School District
School	Address	Notes
Hanover-Horton High School	10000 Moscow Road, Horton	Grades 9-12
Hanover-Horton Middle School	10000 Moscow Road, Horton	Grades 6-8
Hanover-Horton Elementary	131 Fairview St., Horton	Grades PreK-5
