= East Jackson Secondary School =

Location
- 1566 North Sutton Road; Jackson, Michigan 49202; United States; 42°15′32″N 84°20′25″W

Information
- Type: Public High School
- School district: East Jackson Community Schools
- Superintendent: Jeff Punches
- Principal: Joel Cook
- Grades: 7–12
- Enrollment: approximately 580
- Colors: Blue & White
- Nickname: Trojans
- Website: School website

East Jackson Secondary School is a public high school located in southern Mid-Michigan in the eastern part of Jackson County. It currently contains approximately 580 students, ranging from grades 7th through 12th. It is the only secondary school in the East Jackson Community Schools district.

== Administration ==
The administration consists of a principal, athletic director/dean of students, and two counselors. The principal is Joel Cook.

== History ==
The school opened in fall 1960. The architect was Kainlauri, MacMullan and Associates of Ann Arbor. The school included an underground fallout shelter that could house 1,735 people. Located beneath the gymnasium, the shelter featured air and water filtration, an electric generator, and locker rooms that were designed to be used as first aid rooms. Paid for by the federal government, civil defense workers used the shelter for training when it was not being used for regular school functions.

== Athletics ==
East Jackson's team name is the Trojans and their mascot is the Trojan man. The Trojans are part of the Cascades Conference, which also includes Michigan Center, Grass Lake, Addison, Hanover Horton, Napoleon, Manchester, and Vandercook Lake. East Jackson is a member in the Michigan High School Athletic Association (MHSSA).

The following sports are offered at East Jackson:

- Baseball (boys)
- Basketball (girls & boys)
- Bowling (girls & boys)
- Competitive cheerleading (girls)
- Cross country (girls & boys)
- Football (boys)
- Golf (girls & boys)
- Softball (girls)
- Track & field (girls & boys)
- Volleyball (girls)
- Wrestling (boys)
