= Jayhawk =

Jayhawk may refer to:

== School mascots and sports teams ==
- Kansas Jayhawks, teams of the University of Kansas
- Head-Royce School, Oakland, California
- Urbandale High School, Urbandale, Iowa
- Jayhawk-Linn Junior-Senior High School, near Mound City, Kansas
- Vandercook Lake High School, Jackson, Michigan
- Muskegon Community College, Muskegon, Michigan
- Jamestown Community College, Jamestown, New York
- Jefferson Central School, Jefferson, New York
- Jericho High School, Jericho, New York
- Jeannette City School District, Jeannette, Pennsylvania
- St. Joseph Catholic High School (Ogden, Utah)

== Vehicles ==
- Beechcraft AQM-37 Jayhawk, supersonic target drone produced by Raytheon for the US Navy
- Raytheon T-1 Jayhawk, twin-engine jet trainer used by the US Air Force
- Sikorsky MH-60 Jayhawk, US Coast Guard medium range recovery helicopter

== Other uses ==
- Jayhawk, California, in El Dorado County
- Jayhawk Owens (born 1969), American baseball player
- The Jayhawks, a band from Minnesota
  - The Jayhawks (album), 1986
- Jayhawk Area Council, an eastern Kansas council of the Boy Scouts of America
- Tejas and Jayhawk, code names for canceled Intel microprocessors

== See also ==
- Jayhawker, an American Civil War term for pro-Union guerrillas, post-war a term from people from Kansas
- Jayhawkers (film), a 2014 American sports film
- The Jayhawkers!, a 1959 American Western film
- 7th Kansas Cavalry Regiment, a Civil War regiment nicknamed "Jennison's Jayhawkers"
- JHawk, alias of Jeremy Hawkins, an American songwriter and producer for the record label JHawk Productions
