= Cascade Conference (MHSAA) =

High school athletic conference in Michigan, US

Cascades Conference
- Conference: Michigan High School Athletic Association
- Founded: 1954
- Sports fielded: 8
- No. of teams: 10 (11 in 2027–28)
- Region: Jackson County
- Official website: Cascades Conference

The Cascade Conference is a Michigan high school athletic conference that was formed prior to the 1954 school year. The conference includes mostly Class C schools, two Class B schools, and one Class D school with the majority of its members being from Jackson County along with one member each from Hillsdale, Ingham, Lenawee, and Washtenaw counties.

== History ==
=== Formation ===
The Cascades Conference was formed in 1954 with ten schools from the Jackson County League. The original members were: Brooklyn, Concord, East Jackson, Grass Lake, Hanover-Horton, Jackson Vandercook Lake, Michigan Center, Napoleon, Parma and Springport high schools.

=== Red and Blue ===
With the growth of suburbs, some Cascades Conference schools grew more rapidly than others. This led to the creation of the Red and Blue divisions. Between 1983 and 1996, four schools were listed as Cascades-Red Members: Jackson Lumen Christi, Jackson Northwest, Parma Jackson County Western and Brooklyn Columbia Central. In 1996, Jackson Northwest and Jackson Lumen Christi left the Cascades Red for the Capital-Circuit Conference. Brooklyn Columbia Central left the Cascades Red after 1995 and competed as an independent for two years, before joining the Lenawee County Conference at the start of the 1997 school year. Parma Jackson County Western left the Cascades Red after the 1995 school year and joined the Twin Valley Conference.

=== Expansion ===
In 2022, the Cascades Conference was looking to expand from eight to twelve schools for the 2022–23 school year. On June 13, Brooklyn Columbia Central of the Lenawee County Athletic Association accepted their invite to join the Cascades, which they were previously a member of from 1968 to 1996. A little over a week later, Leslie, a member of the Greater Lansing Athletic Conference accepted their invitation as well. Within a few weeks after Columbia Central and Leslie joined, two Big "8" members, Jonesville and Homer accepted their invitations to join the conference as well. All four schools will be joining the conference for the 2022–23 school year.

With the Cascades Conference expanding to twelve teams, the conference decided to split the league into two geographical divisions (East and West).

Divisions from 2022-2026
East	West
East Jackson	Addison
Grass Lake	Columbia Central
Leslie	Hanover-Horton
Manchester	Homer
Michigan Center	Jonesville
Napoleon	Vandercook Lake

With both East Jackson and Homer leaving for the Big "8" Conference after the 2025-26 season (reducing the conference from twelve to ten teams), the division alignment changed with Napoleon and Vandercook Lake swapping divisions.

Divisions as of 2026-27
East	West
Grass Lake	Addison
Leslie	Columbia Central
Manchester	Hanover-Horton
Michigan Center	Jonesville
Vandercook Lake	Napoleon

== Member schools ==
=== Current members ===
The following institutions are full members of the Cascade Conference for the 2026–27 school year:

School name	Location	Nickname	Class	Enrollment (Note: Enrollment numbers are as of 2026-27 school year.)	Joined	Colors	Previous conference
Addison	Addison, Lenawee County	Panthers	C	198	1988		Lenawee County Athletic Association
Brooklyn Columbia Central	Columbia Township, Jackson County	Golden Eagles	B	379	1968 (Note: Columbia Central left the conference to join the Lenawee County Athletic Association in 1996.); 2023		Lakeland "C" Conference; Lenawee County Athletic Association
Grass Lake	Grass Lake, Jackson County	Warriors	B	378	1954 (Note: Grass Lake left the conference in 1964 to join the Lakeland "C" Conference.); 1976		Jackson County League; Southern Central Athletic Association
Hanover-Horton	Horton, Jackson County	Comets	C	290	1954 (Note: Hanover-Horton left the conference in 1965 to join the Mid-Southern Conference.); 1960 (football) (Note: Hanover-Horton did not start a football team until 1959.); 1976		Jackson County League; Independent; Southern Central Athletic Association
Jonesville	Jonesville, Hillsdale County	Comets	C	317	2023		Big "8" Conference
Leslie	Leslie, Ingham County	Black Hawks	C	299	2023		Greater Lansing Athletic Conference
Manchester	Manchester, Washtenaw County	Flying Dutchmen	C	184	1983		Lenawee County Athletic Association
Michigan Center	Michigan Center, Jackson County	Cardinals	B	492	1954		Jackson County League
Napoleon	Napoleon, Jackson County	Pirates	C	352	1954		Jackson County League
Vandercook Lake (Note: Vandercook Lake played 8-man football from 2020 until 2023.)	Jackson, Jackson County	Jayhawks	D	159	1954		Jackson County League

=== Future member ===
School	Nickname	Location	Class	Enrollment (Note: Enrollment numbers are as of 2026-27 school year.)	Joining (Note: Represents the calendar year when fall sports competition begins.)	Current Conference	Colors
Stockbridge	Panthers	Stockbridge, Ingham County	C	323	2027	Big "8" Conference	

=== Former members ===
School name	Location	Nickname	Joined (Note: Represents the calendar year when fall sports competition begins.)	Previous Conference	Left (Note: Represents the calendar year when spring sports competition end.)	Successive Conference	Current Conference
Brooklyn	Brooklyn, Jackson County	Golden Eagles	1954	Jackson County League	1960	Mid-Southern Conference	Closed in 1967 (Note: Brooklyn and Cement City consolidated to form Columbia Central.)
Concord	Concord, Jackson County	Yellowjackets	1954	Jackson County League	1973	Big "8" Conference	
East Jackson	Jackson, Jackson County	Trojans	1954	Jackson County League	2026	Big "8" Conference	
Homer	Homer, Calhoun County	Trojans	2023	Big "8" Conference	2026	Big "8" Conference	
Jackson Lumen Christi	Summit Township, Jackson County	Titans	1983; 1991 (football)	Independent	1996	Capital Circuit League	Catholic High School League
Jackson Northwest	Blackman Charter Township, Jackson County	Mounties	1960; 1983	Independent; Twin Valley Athletic Association	1976; 1996	Independent; Capital Circuit League	Interstate 8 Conference (Note: Jackson Northwest will be leaving the Interstate 8 to join the Southeastern Conference for the 2027-28 school year.)
Parma	Parma, Jackson County	Panthers	1954	Jackson County League	1961	Closed in 1961 (Note: Parma and Spring Arbor consolidated to form Jackson County Western.)	
Parma Jackson County Western (Note: Also known as Parma Western)	Spring Arbor Township, Jackson County	Panthers	1961; 1983	New school Southeastern Conference	1976; 1996	Independent; Twin Valley Athletic Association	Interstate 8 Conference
Springport	Springport, Jackson County	Spartans	1954	Jackson County League	1963	Independent (football) (Note: Springport joined the Cereal Center Conference for football in 1964.); Cereal Center Conference	Big "8" Conference

=== Membership timeline ===
Full Members Full Members (Blue Division) Full Members (Red Division) Full members (non-football) Non-football members (Red Division) Other Conference
