= Hanover-Horton High School =

Location
- 10000 Moscow Road; Horton, Michigan 49246; United States; 42°06′58″N 84°31′03″W

Information
- Type: Public
- Established: 1874
- School district: Hanover-Horton School District
- Principal: Isaac Cottrell
- Faculty: 16.00 (on FTE basis)
- Grades: 9 to 12
- Enrollment: 368 (2018-19)
- Student to teacher ratio: 23.00
- Colors: Red and white
- Athletics conference: Cascade Conference
- Nickname: Comets
- Newspaper: Skywriter
- Website: www.hanoverhorton.org/high-school/

Hanover-Horton High School (formerly Hanover-Horton Central Secondary School) is a public secondary school located in Horton, Michigan, United States. The school serves grades 9 to 12 in the Hanover-Horton School District.

== History ==
The Hanover Schools and Horton Schools merged in 1958. Prior to the merger, each district consisted of one elementary and one high school.

== Demographics ==
The demographic breakdown of the 394 students enrolled in 2014-2015 was:

- Male - 53.%
- Female - 46.2%
- Native American/Alaskan - 0%
- Asian/Pacific islanders - 0.5%
- Black - 1.0%
- Hispanic - 3.6%
- White - 93.4%
- Multiracial - 1.5%

23.1% of the students were eligible for free or reduced priced lunch.

== Arts ==
Hanover-Horton offers Fine Arts programs, including Concert Band, Jazz Band, Marching Band, and Choir.

== Athletics ==
H.H. High School maintains a football team, as well as cross country, basketball, volleyball, baseball, softball, golf, track and field, soccer, and bowling teams. The Comets compete in the Cascades Conference with Michigan Center, Napoleon, Vandercook Lake, Addison, East Jackson, Grass Lake, and Manchester.
