= Greg Pscodna =

American football coach (born c. 1969)

Current position
- Title: Athletic director
- Team: Ludington HS (MI)

Biographical details
- Born: c. 1964 (age 61–62); Lansing, Michigan, U.S.
- Education: Adrian College (1986); Michigan State University (1990)

Playing career
- 1982–1985: Adrian
- Position: Defensive tackle

Coaching career (HC unless noted)
- 1989: Michigan State (GA)
- 1990–1994: Albion (AHC/DC)
- 1995: Northern Michigan (DC/DB)
- 1996–2002: Defiance
- 2003: Grand Valley State (AHC/LB)
- 2008–2011: Michigan Center HS (MI)
- 2012–2017: Alma
- 2019–2021: Leslie HS (MI)

Administrative career (AD unless noted)
- 2004–2012: Michigan Center HS (MI)
- 2018–2019: Montabella HS (MI)
- 2022–present: Ludington HS (MI)

Head coaching record
- Overall: 49–78 (college); 30–35 (high school)
- Tournaments: 0–1 (NCAA D-III playoffs)

Accomplishments and honors

Championships
- 1 HCAC (2001)

Awards
- 2× HCAC Coach of the Year

Greg Pscodna (born c. 1964) is an American high school athletic director and former college football coach. He is the athletic director for Ludington High School, a position he has held since 2022. He was the head football coach for Defiance College from 1996 to 2002, Michigan Center Jr/Sr High School from 2008 to 2011, Alma College from 2012 to 2017, and Leslie High School from 2019 to 2021. He was the athletic director for Michigan Center Jr/Sr High School from 2004 to 2012 and Montabella High School from 2018 to 2019. He also coached for Michigan State, Albion, Northern Michigan, and Grand Valley State. He played college football for Adrian as a defensive tackle.

== Head coaching record ==
=== College ===
Year	Team	Overall	Conference	Standing	Bowl/playoffs
Defiance Yellow Jackets (NCAA Division III independent) (1996–1997)
1996	Defiance	3–6			
1997	Defiance	1–8			
Defiance Yellow Jackets (Michigan Intercollegiate Athletic Association) (1998–1999)
1998	Defiance	3–6	1–5	7th	
1999	Defiance	4–5	3–3	4th	
Defiance Yellow Jackets (Heartland Collegiate Athletic Conference) (2000–2002)
2000	Defiance	7–3	4–2	3rd	
2001	Defiance	8–3	5–1	T–1st	NCAA Division III First Round
2002	Defiance	3–7	1–5	T–6th	
Defiance:		29–38	14–16		
Alma Scots (Michigan Intercollegiate Athletic Association) (2012–2017)
2012	Alma	1–9	1–5	6th	
2013	Alma	1–9	1–5	T–6th	
2014	Alma	2–8	0–6	7th	
2015	Alma	5–5	2–4	5th	
2016	Alma	7–3	4–2	3rd	
2017	Alma	4–6	1–5	6th	
Alma:		20–40	9–27		
Total:		49–78			
National championship Conference title Conference division title or championship game berth

=== High school ===
Year	Team	Overall	Conference	Standing	Bowl/playoffs
Michigan Center Cardinals (Cascade Conference) (2008–2011)
2008	Michigan Center	3–6	2–5	6th	
2009	Michigan Center	7–4	5–2	3rd	
2010	Michigan Center	9–1	7–0	1st	
2011	Michigan Center	3–6	2–5	6th	
Michigan Center:		22–17	16–12		
Leslie Blackhawks () (2019–2021)
2019	Leslie	3–6	1–3	5th	
2020	Leslie	2–5	2–2	3rd	
2021	Leslie	3–7	2–2	3rd	
Leslie:		8–18	5–7		
Total:		30–35			
National championship Conference title Conference division title or championship game berth
