= Old Hanover High School =

- Hanover High School Complex
- U.S. National Register of Historic Places
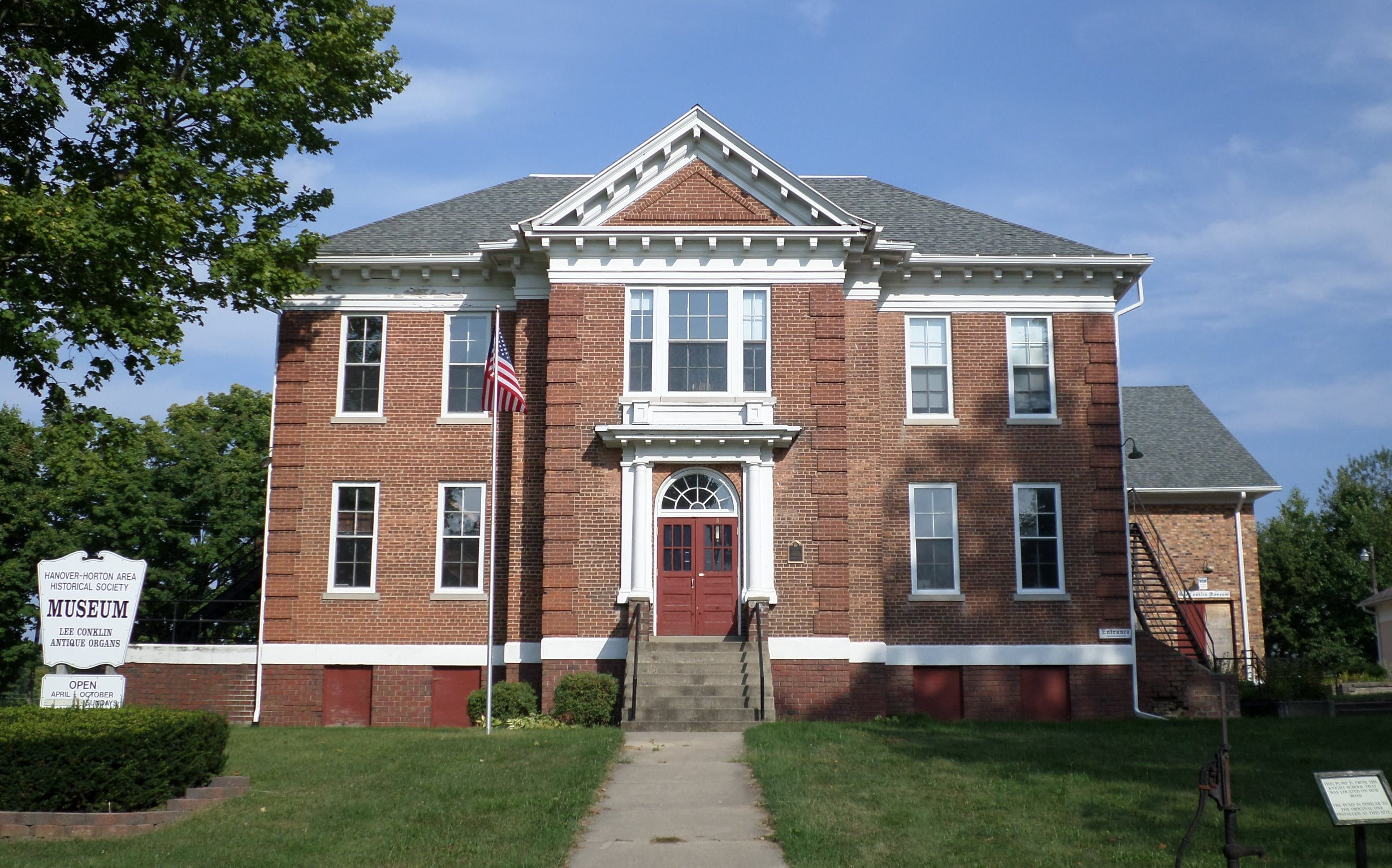
- Interactive map
- Location: 105 Fairview St., Hanover, Michigan
- Coordinates: 42°6′7″N 84°32′50″W
- Area: 1.3 acres (0.53 ha)
- Built: 1910
- Built by: O.J. Reniger
- Architectural style: Colonial Revival
- NRHP reference No.: 12001030
- Added to NRHP: December 12, 2012

The Old Hanover High School is a former school building located at 105 Fairview Street in Hanover, Michigan. It now houses the Lee Conklin Reed Organ & History Museum. The building was listed on the National Register of Historic Places in 2012.

== History ==
The first schoolhouse in Hanover was a log building constructed in 1839. In 1850 it was replaced with a new brick one-room schoolhouse. In 1874, a new multi-room "high school" was constructed in Hanover, providing spaces for grades one through twelve. In the summer of 1910, this school was destroyed by fire. The school board quickly raised funds to replace it, and hired O. J. Reniger of Marshall, Michigan as the general contractor.

Construction on a new school, located at the site of the older building, began later in 1910, and was completed in mid-1911. IN 1934, a new gymnasium was added to the building. Materials for the new gym were taken, in part, from older buildings in the area, including a former church that had been used as a school gymnasium in the past. A new farm shop building was built near the high school in 1938; however, the building proved inadequate and was replaced in 1948 by the structure currently known as the Herrick Building.

Beginning in the 1940s, the Hanover School District began merging with other local, smaller school districts; notably, the nearby Horton Schools merged with Hanover to form the Hanover-Horton School District. The result was an influx of students into the Hanover school. In response, the district built a new elementary school in Hanover in the mid-1950s. Elementary-aged children were moved from the "high school" to the new school. In 1959, a new Hanover-Horton High School was opened in Horton, and ninth through twelfth grade students were moved to the new school, leaving only grades seven and eight in the old Hanover High School. In late 1962, these students also moved to the new school.

The gymnasium remained in use for a few years, and in 1963 the school board attempted to sell the old school. However, they were unsuccessful, and the buildings remained vacant until 1977. In that year, the board began leasing the building to the Hanover-Horton Area Historical Society to house the Lee Conklin Reed Organ & History Museum, a collection of organs and melodeons donated to the society by Lee Conklin. In 1995, the board sold the building to the society.

== Description ==
The Old Hanover High School Complex includes the High School Building with a gymnasium addition, and the nearby Herrick Building. The school buildings are located atop a hill facing the village.

The High School building proper is two-story, Georgian Revival style dark red-and-brown brick structure, and is an example of what is known as the "rectangular plan" school structure. It has a steeply pitched hip roof and a raised basement level, resulting in three floors of interior space. The front facade is symmetrical, five bays wide, with a projecting three-bay center entry pavilion. The pavilion contains a double-door entry with semi-circular arched transom window, Tuscan order pilasters, a tri-part window on the second floor, and a pediment above. Brick quoins are placed on the corners of the pavilion and the main building. Above the second-story windows are a frieze and cornice embellished with modillion blocks, which continue onto the other sides. The sides of the building are six bays wide.

Across the back end of the school is a later addition containing a gymnasium. The addition is a rectangular gable-roofed structure, wider than the main school. It is constructed with pilasters and wood from a former church, and is clad with cream-and-orange brick taken from a tile kiln in Jackson.

The Herrick Building is a single-story rectangular building with a side gable roof. It sits on a concrete pad, and the exterior is a combination of brick veneer, vinyl siding, and masonry block.
