= Justice Snow =

Justice Snow may refer to:

- Ernest A. Snow (1876–1927), associate justice of the Michigan Supreme Court
- Leslie Perkins Snow (1862–1934), associate justice of the New Hampshire Supreme Court
