= Norvell Township, Michigan =

- Civil township
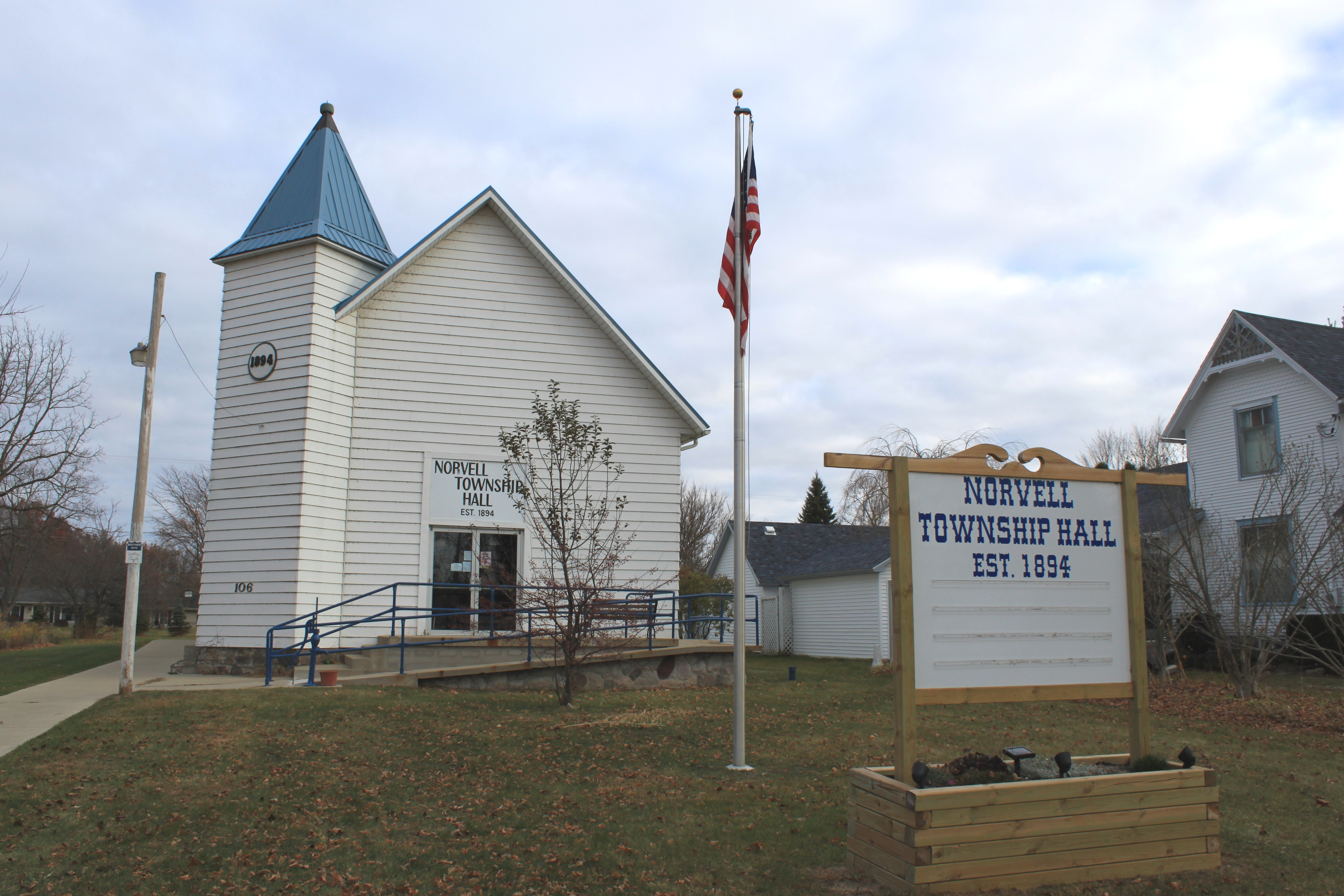
- Norvell Township Hall

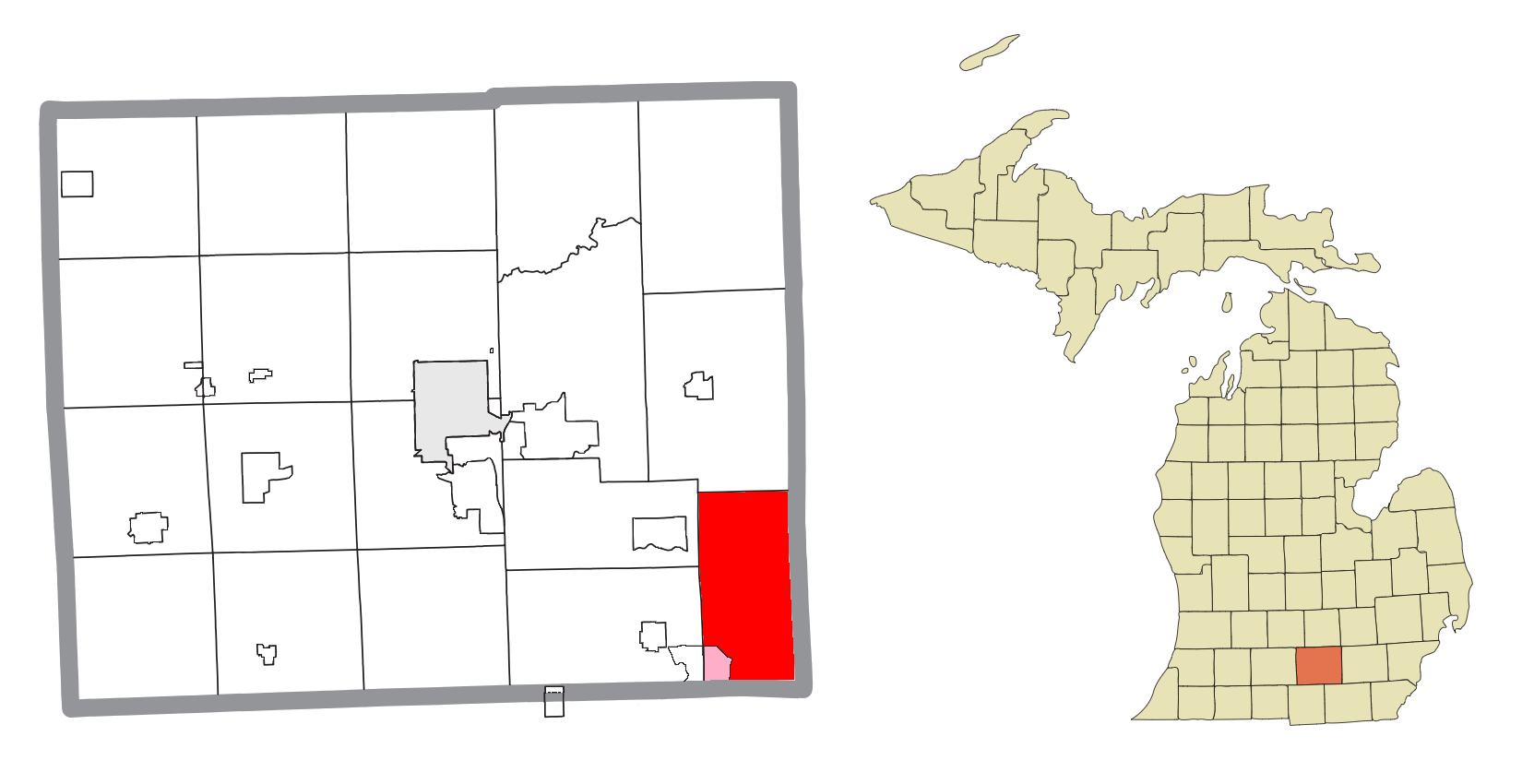
- Location within Jackson County (red) and an administered portion of the Vineyard Lake community (pink)

- Location within the state of Michigan Norvell Township (the United States)
- Coordinates: 42°08′00″N 84°10′00″W
- Country: United States
- State: Michigan
- County: Jackson
- Established: 1894

Government
  - Supervisor: Andrew Haystead
  - Clerk: Sharon Pero

Area
  - Total: 32.16 sq mi (83.3 km^{2})
  - Land: 29.53 sq mi (76.5 km^{2})
  - Water: 2.63 sq mi (6.8 km^{2})
- Elevation: 925 ft (282 m)

Population (2020)
  - Total: 2,800
  - Density: 95/sq mi (37/km^{2})
- Time zone: UTC-5 (Eastern (EST))
  - Summer (DST): UTC-4 (EDT)
- ZIP code(s): 49230 (Brooklyn); 49240 (Grass Lake); 49263 (Norvell)
- Area code: 517
- FIPS code: 26-59180
- GNIS feature ID: 1626820
- Website: Official website

Norvell Township is a civil township of Jackson County in the U.S. state of Michigan. The population was 2,800 at the 2020 census. The township is named after John Norvell, one of Michigan's first U.S. senators.

== Communities ==
- Norvell is an unincorporated community in the township at 42°09′30″N 84°11′01″W. It is situated at the outlet of Norvell Lake on the River Raisin. William Hunt, the first white settler in the area, arrived in 1831. A post office was established on March 17, 1838, with Harvey Austin as the first postmaster. It was a station on the Lake Shore and Michigan Southern Railway in 1878. The community was named for John Norvell, one of the first U.S. senators from Michigan.
- Vineyard Lake is an unincorporated community and census-designated place (CDP) in the southwest corner of the township. The CDP also extends into Columbia Township to the west.

== Schools ==
- Columbia School District
- Grass Lake Community Schools

== Recreation ==
- Watkins Lake State Park and County Preserve
- Camp O' the Hills Girl Scouts Camp
- Camp Liberty - Camp Liberty provides inclusive outdoor recreation programs that aid in the reintegration of U.S. military service members, veterans, and their families, with an emphasis on assisting those with post-traumatic stress and traumatic brain injuries
- Hollerfest - A family friendly celebration of local music, food, and community held at Frog Holler Farm

== Geography ==
According to the United States Census Bureau, the township has a total area of 32.16 square miles (83.29 km^{2}), of which 29.53 square miles (76.48 km^{2}) is land and 2.63 square miles (6.81 km^{2}) (8.18%) is water.

Norvell Township occupies the southeast corner of Jackson County. It is bordered to the east by Washtenaw County and to the south by Lenawee County. It is 15 miles (24 km) southeast of Jackson, the county seat.

The township contains 717 acres (290 ha) of Watkins Lake State Park and County Preserve, owned by the Michigan Department of Natural Resources.

== Demographics ==
As of the census of 2000, there were 2,922 people, 1,135 households, and 831 families residing in the township. The population density was 97.4 inhabitants per square mile (37.6/km^{2}). There were 1,568 housing units at an average density of 52.2 per square mile (20.2/km^{2}). The racial makeup of the township was 97.26% White, 0.62% African American, 0.51% Native American, 0.10% Asian, 0.14% from other races, and 1.37% from two or more races. Hispanic or Latino of any race were 0.68% of the population.

There were 1,135 households, out of which 29.8% had children under the age of 18 living with them, 63.9% were married couples living together, 5.7% had a female householder with no husband present, and 26.7% were non-families. 22.2% of all households were made up of individuals, and 8.2% had someone living alone who was 65 years of age or older. The average household size was 2.56 and the average family size was 3.00.

In the township the population was spread out, with 23.9% under the age of 18, 6.0% from 18 to 24, 27.6% from 25 to 44, 29.0% from 45 to 64, and 13.6% who were 65 years of age or older. The median age was 41 years. For every 100 females, there were 107.1 males. For every 100 females age 18 and over, there were 107.9 males.

The median income for a household in the township was $49,167, and the median income for a family was $55,221. Males had a median income of $45,756 versus $29,625 for females. The per capita income for the township was $20,488. About 6.9% of families and 6.6% of the population were below the poverty line, including 3.3% of those under age 18 and 14.2% of those age 65 or over.

== Gallery ==
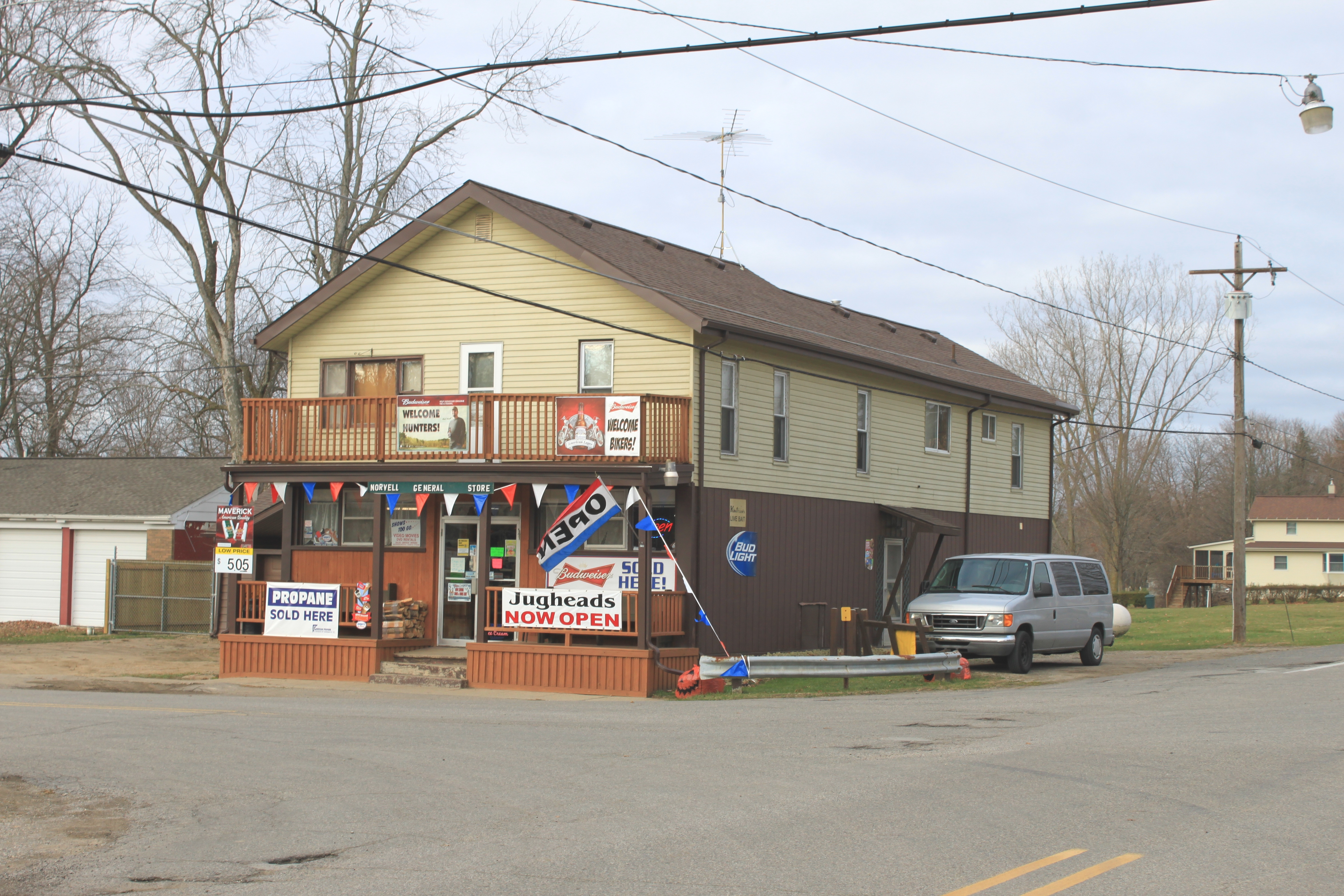
Norvell General Store

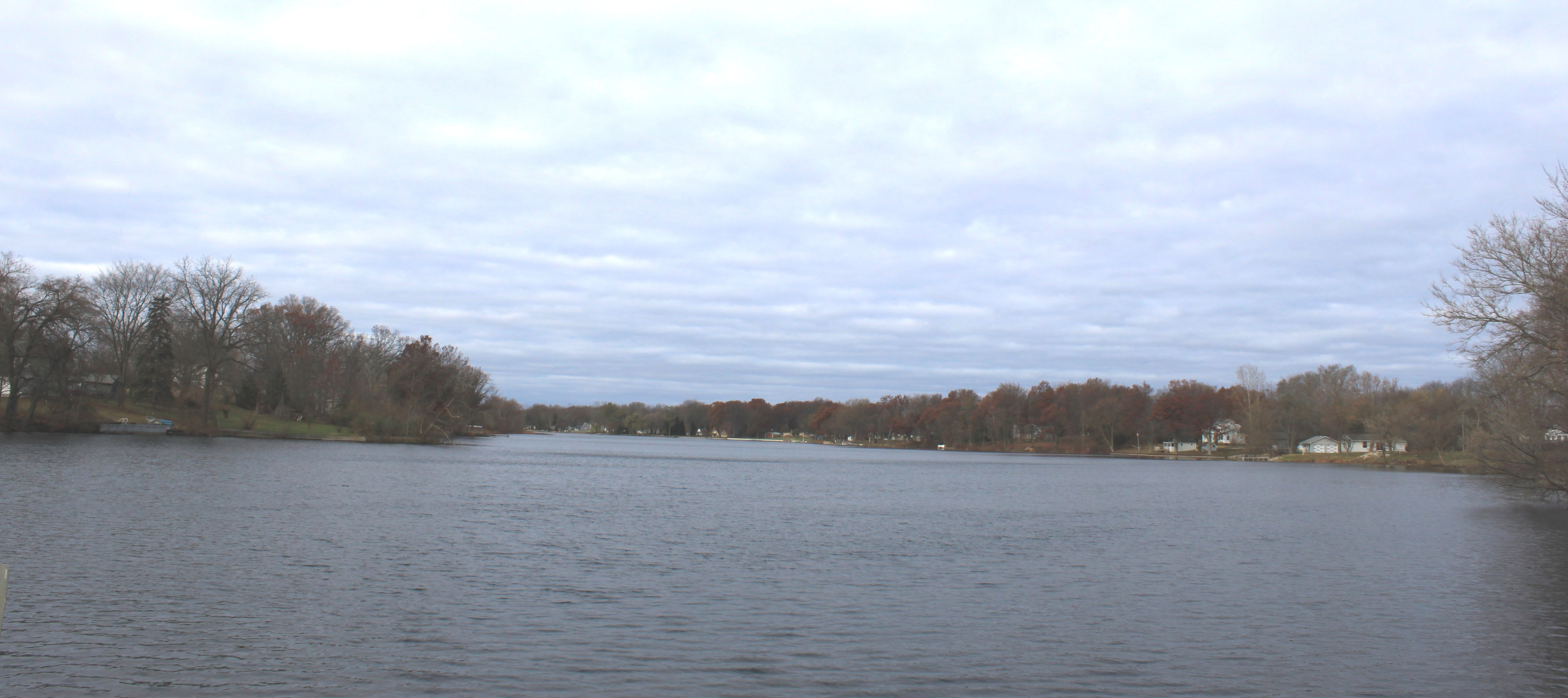
Norvell Lake

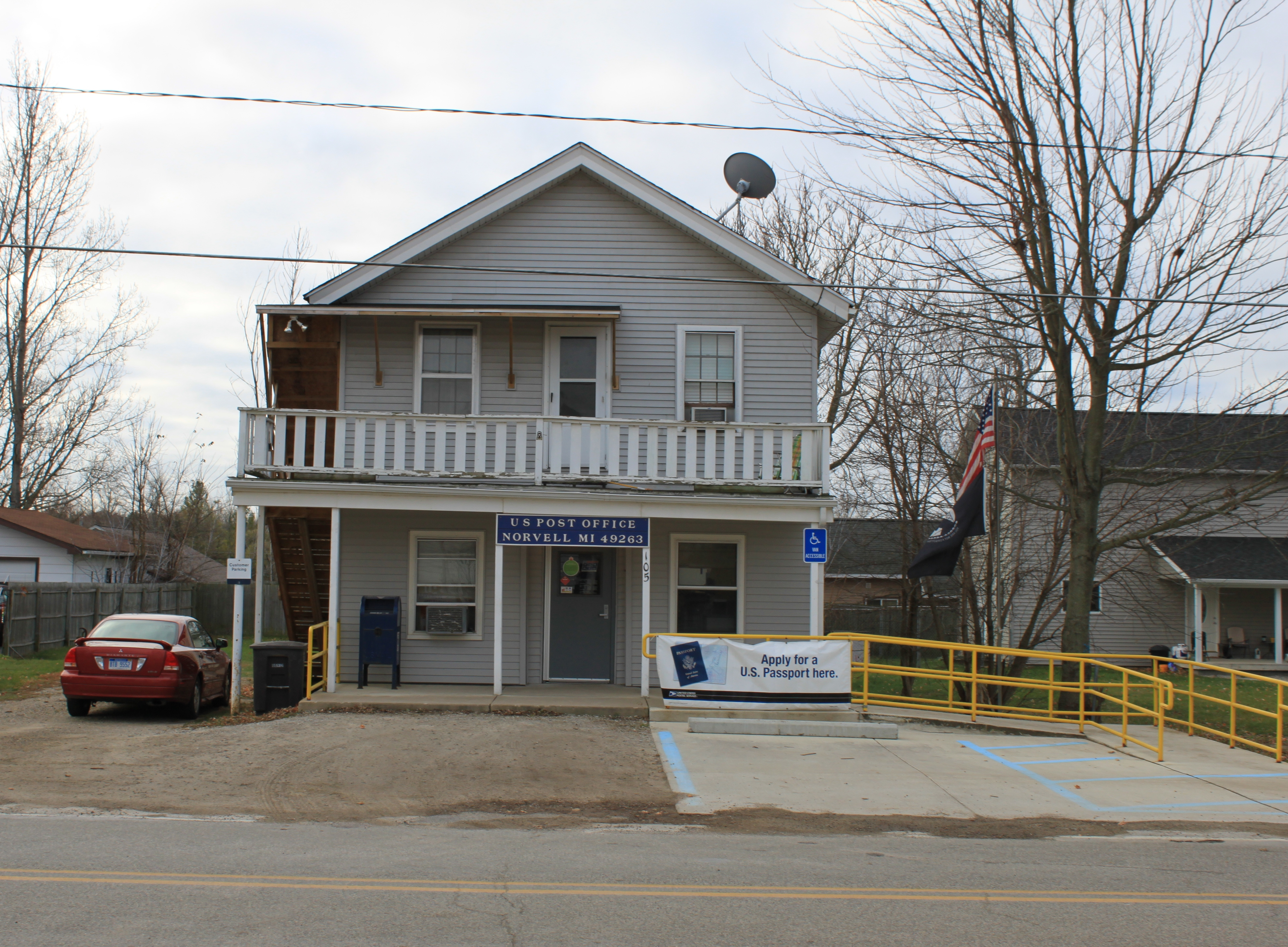
US Post Office

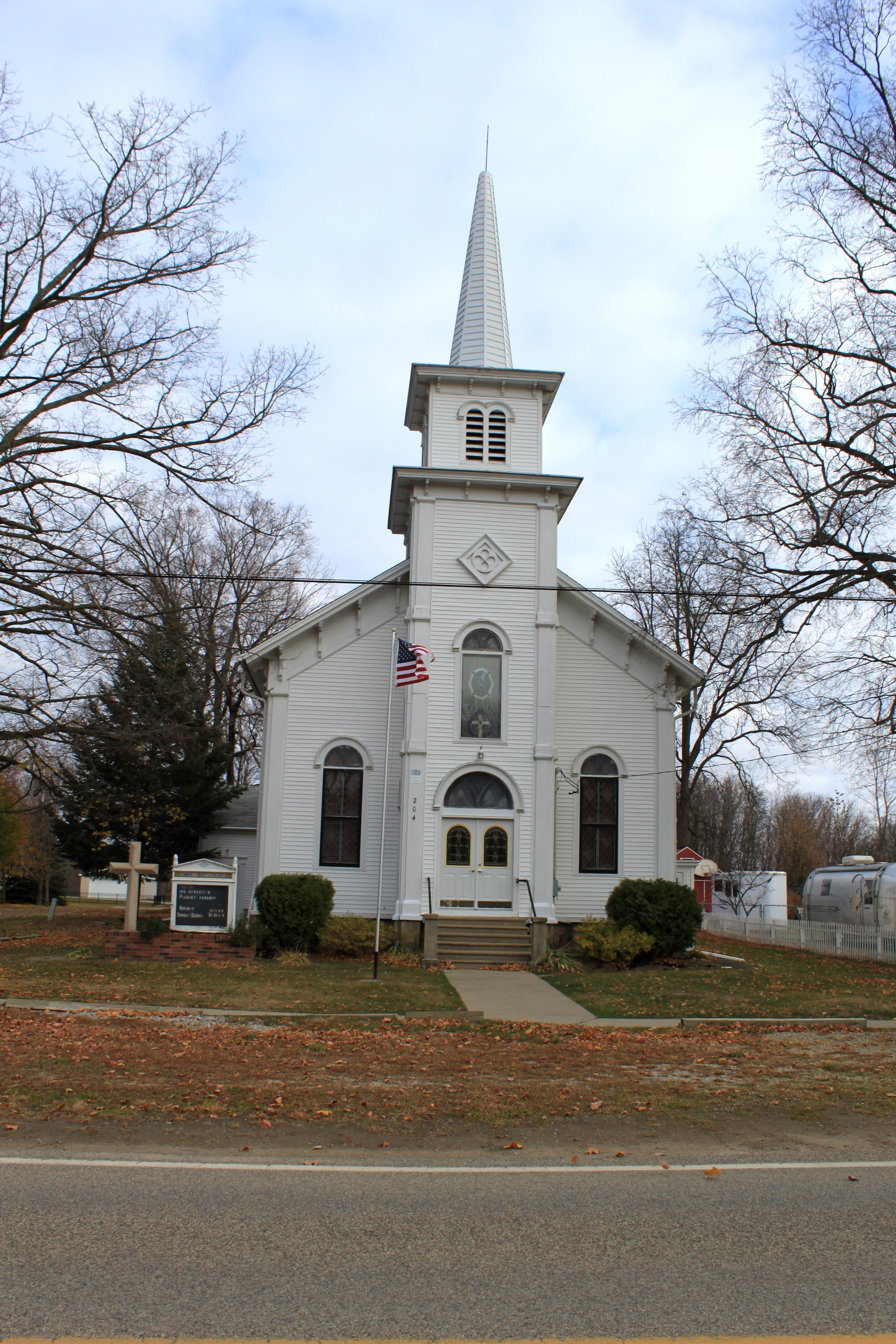
Community Baptist Church
