= Watkins Lake State Park and County Preserve =

Park in Michigan, USA

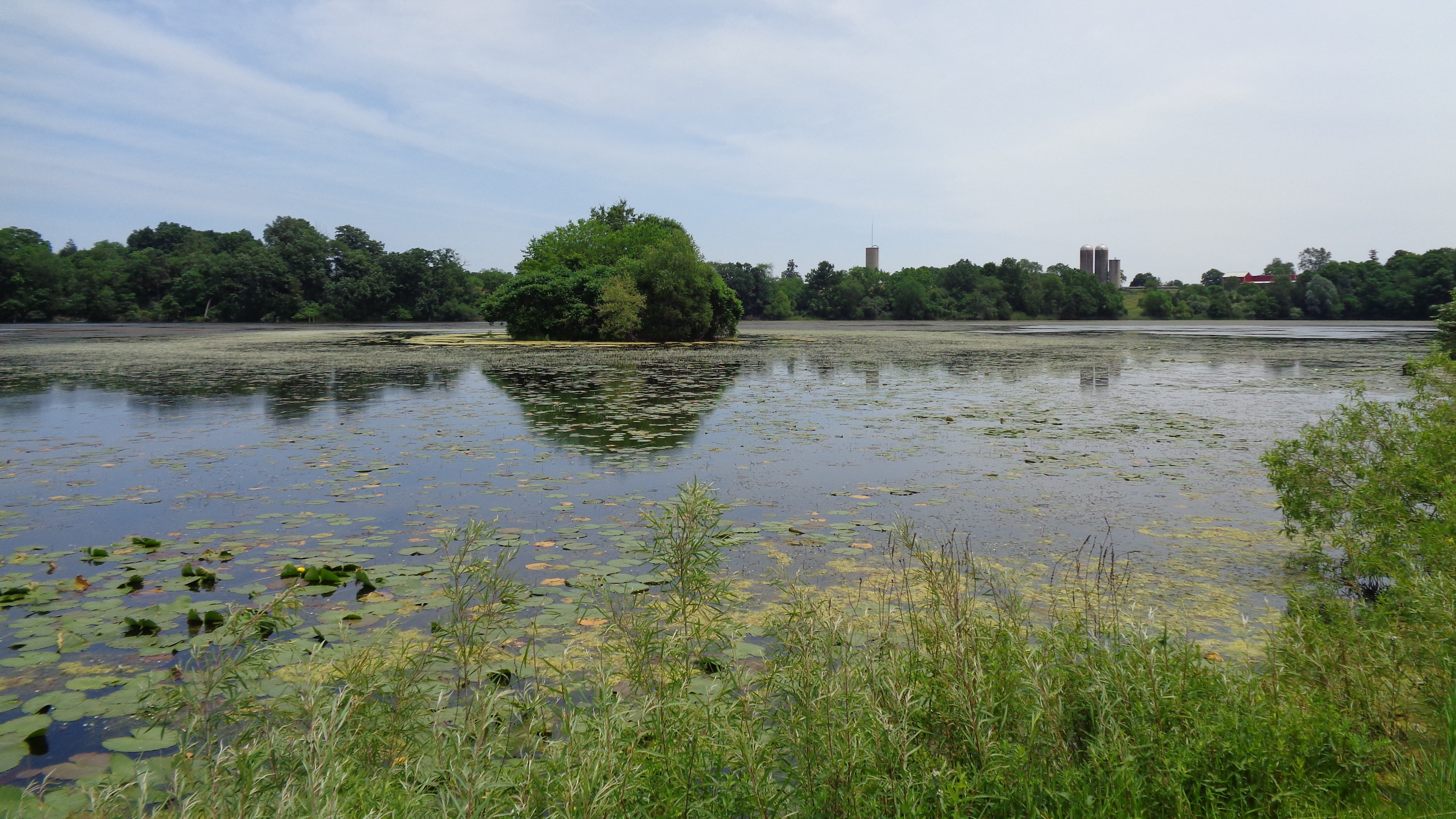
- Watkins Lake from Arnold Road

- Location within Michigan Location within the United States
- Type: Michigan state park
- Location: Jackson & Washtenaw counties, Michigan, United States
- Nearest city: Manchester, Michigan
- Coordinates: 42°07′29″N 84°08′08″W
- Area: 1,122 acres (454 ha)
- Elevation: 974 feet (297 m)
- Established: 2016
- Administrator: Michigan Department of Natural Resources and Washtenaw County Parks & Recreation Commission
- Website: Official website

Watkins Lake State Park and County Preserve is a combination public recreation area and nature preserve located five miles west of Manchester in Jackson and Washtenaw counties, Michigan. The area occupies a total of 1,122 acres (454 ha), with the Michigan Department of Natural Resources owning 717 acres (290 ha) in Norvell Township, Jackson County, and Washtenaw County owning 405 acres (164 ha) in Manchester Township. Dedicated in 2017, it is under the joint management of the Michigan DNR and the Washtenaw County Parks & Recreation Commission. A five-mile former rail corridor runs through the park and into grasslands in the eastern portion of the preserve.

== History ==
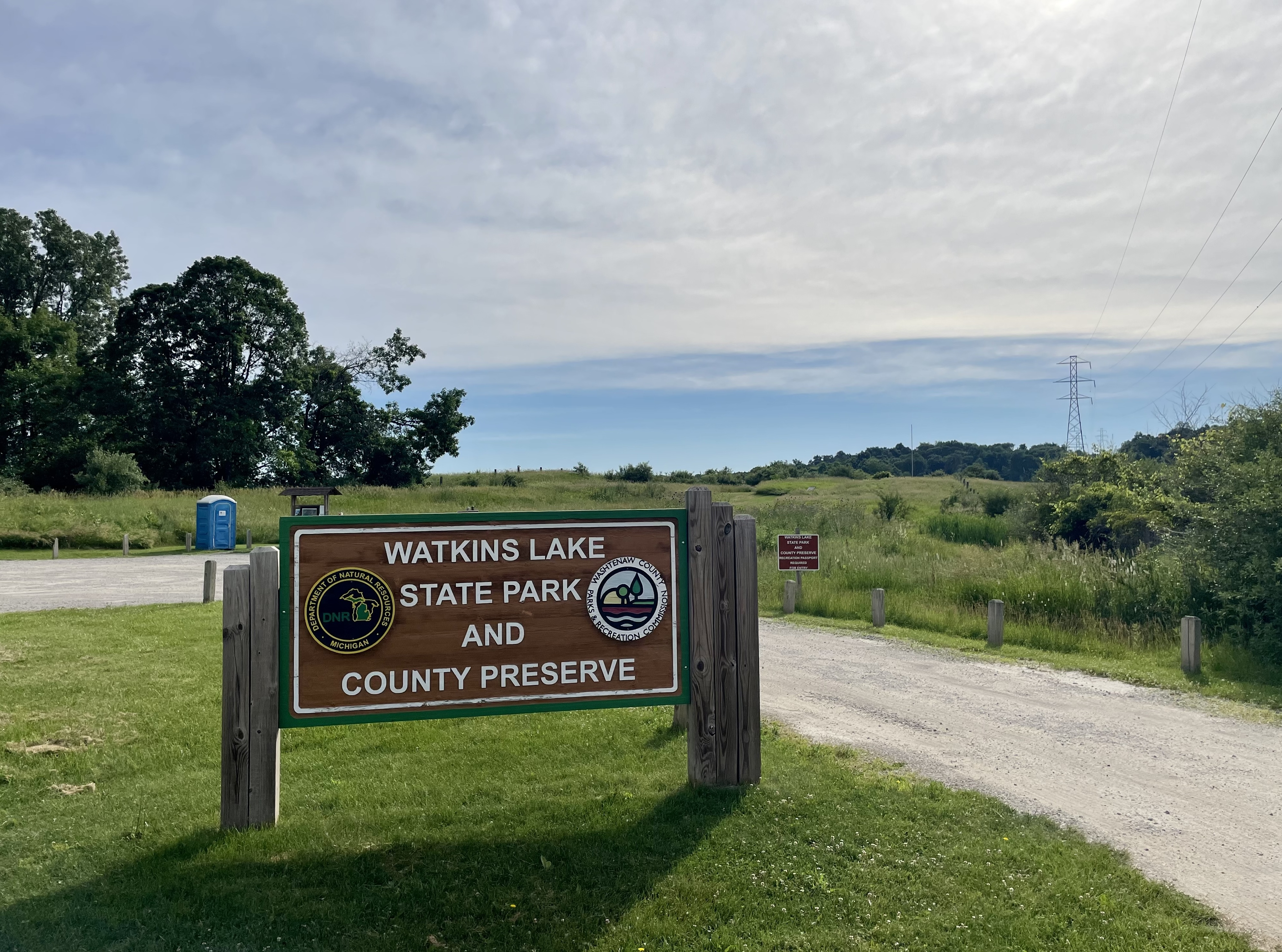
Sign at the park entrance

The park bears the name of Royal and Sally Carpenter Watkins, the first settlers to farm the area, who are known to have participated in the Underground Railroad in the years leading up to the Civil War. In 2016, the state acquired a portion of their former lands in Norvell Township using $2.9 million from the Michigan Natural Resources Trust Fund. The Washtenaw County Parks and Recreation Commission purchased 405 acres from property owner Gary Trolz in 2015; Trolz subsequently sold an adjoining 717 acres to the MDNR in 2016, which opened the way to the creation the park and preserve.
