= Dean Hudnutt =

American sports shooter

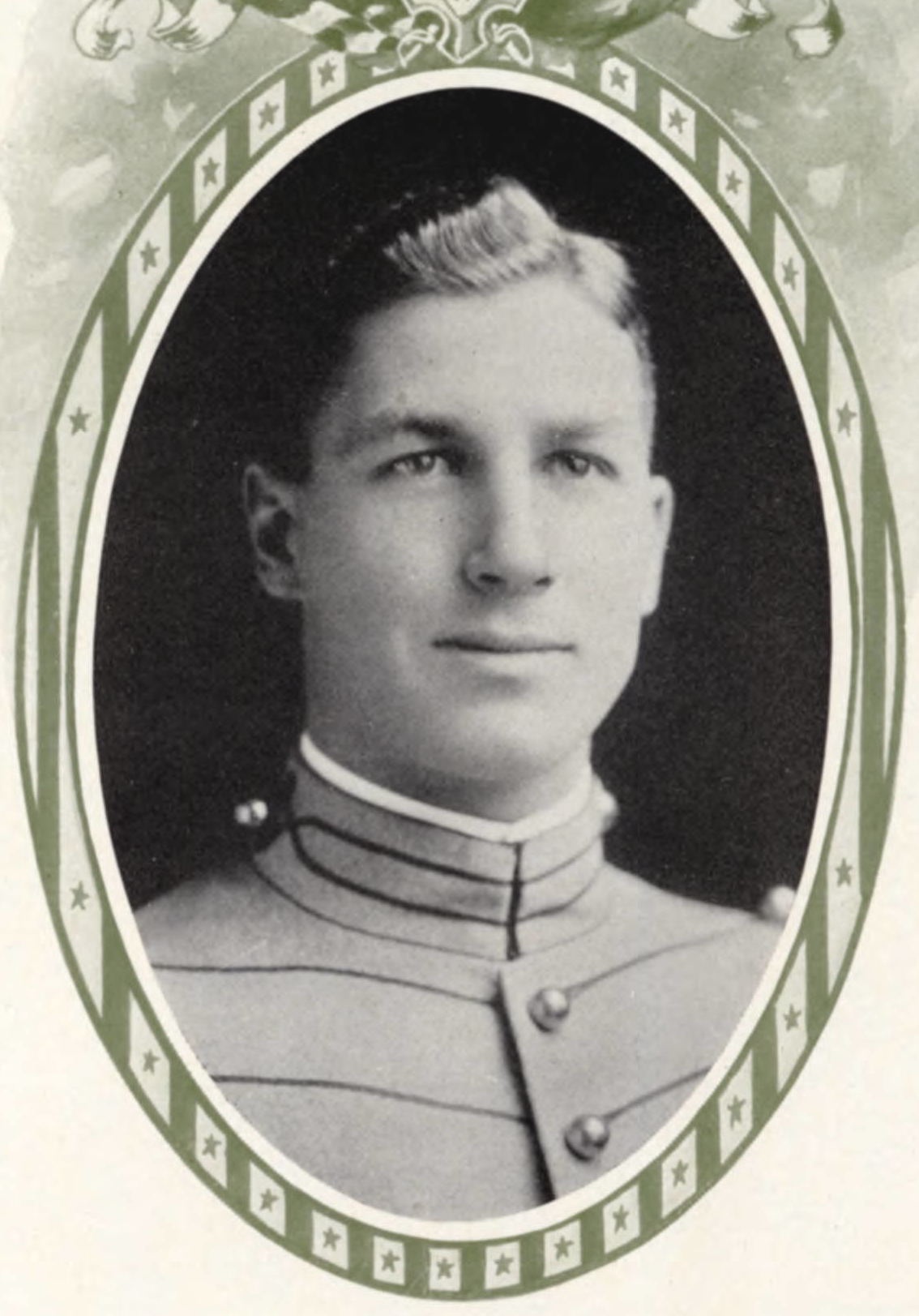
- At West Point in 1916

Personal information
- Born: May 25, 1891 Hanover, Michigan, United States
- Died: October 11, 1943 (aged 52) New Haven, Connecticut, United States

Sport
- Sport: Sports shooting

Dean Hudnutt (May 25, 1891 – October 11, 1943) was an American sports shooter.

== Biography ==
Dean Hudnutt was born in Hanover, Michigan on May 25, 1891. He graduated from Albion College with an A.B. degree in 1912. Hudnutt then entered the United States Military Academy at West Point in June 1912, graduating in June 1916 with a commission as a second lieutenant of field artillery.

During World War I, Hudnutt served as temporary major in France. After the war, he participated in a pistol competition at Le Mans in May 1919 and then in the Inter-Allied Games at Paris. Hudnutt then returned to West Point as a mathematics instructor from August 1919 to December 1922. He graduated from the Field Artillery School Advanced Course in June 1926 and the Command and General Staff School in June 1927.

Hudnutt competed in the 25 m pistol event at the 1936 Summer Olympics. He was promoted to lieutenant colonel in July 1937.

After graduating from the Army War College in 1940, Hudnutt became a professor of military science and tactics at Yale University in July 1940. He accepted a temporary promotion to colonel in July 1941. Hudnutt died in New Haven, Connecticut on October 11, 1943, and was buried at West Point Cemetery.
