= Vineyard Lake, Michigan =

- Census-designated place (CDP) & unincorporated community
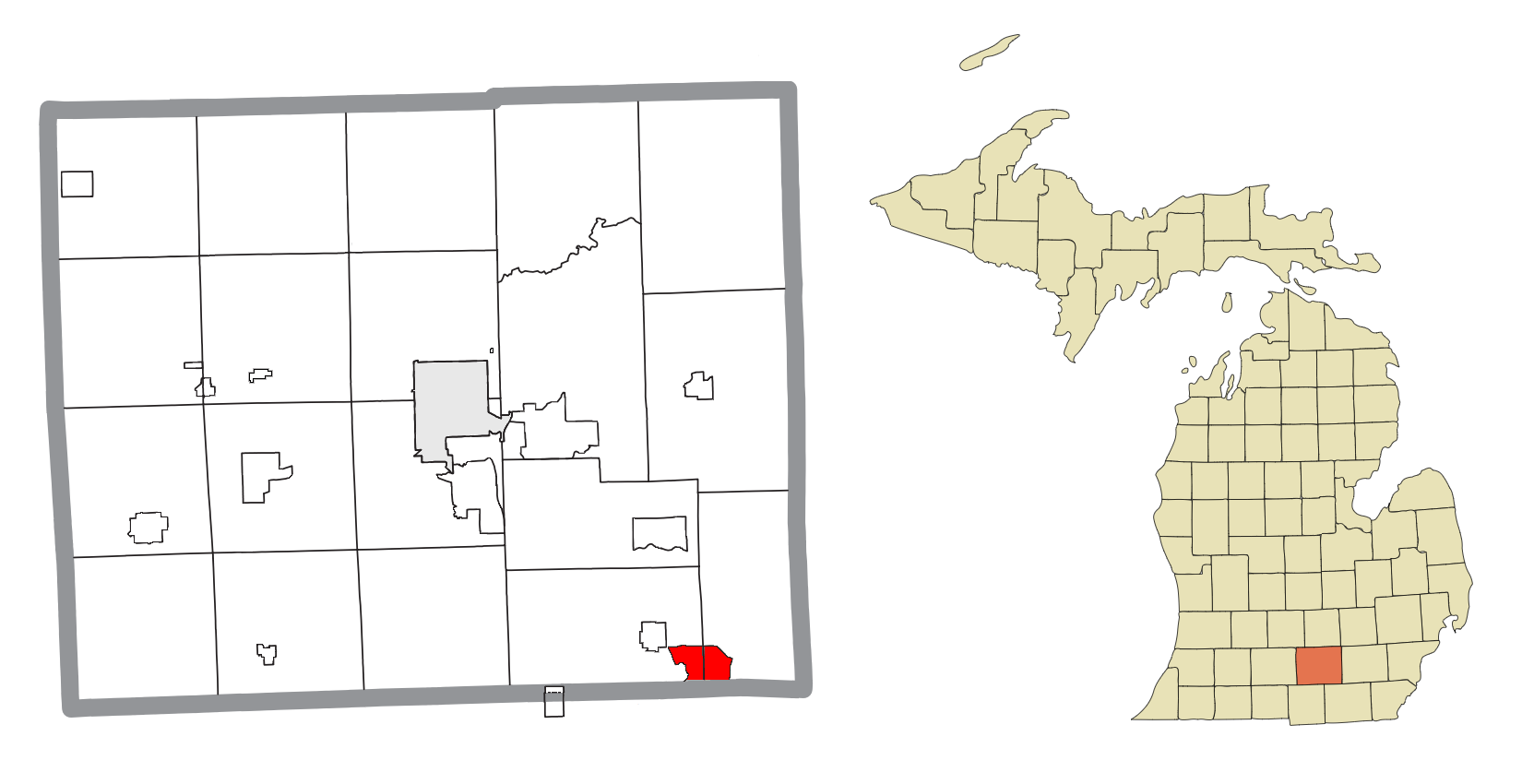
- Location within Jackson County

- Location within the state of Michigan Vineyard Lake (the United States)
- Coordinates: 42°05′12″N 84°12′37″W
- Country: United States
- State: Michigan
- County: Jackson
- Townships: Columbia and Norvell

Area
  - Total: 3.43 sq mi (8.89 km^{2})
  - Land: 2.56 sq mi (6.64 km^{2})
  - Water: 0.87 sq mi (2.25 km^{2})
- Elevation: 965 ft (294 m)

Population (2020)
  - Total: 992
  - Density: 387.1/sq mi (149.45/km^{2})
- Time zone: UTC-5 (Eastern (EST))
  - Summer (DST): UTC-4 (EDT)
- ZIP code(s): 49230 (Brooklyn)
- Area code: 517
- GNIS feature ID: 2583767
- FIPS code: 26-82490

Vineyard Lake is an unincorporated community and census-designated place (CDP) in Jackson County in the U.S. state of Michigan. As of the 2020 census, Vineyard Lake had a population of 992. It is located within Columbia Township to the west and Norvell Township to the east.

== History ==
The community of Vineyard Lake was listed as a newly-organized census-designated place for the 2010 census, meaning it now has officially defined boundaries and population statistics for the first time.

== Geography ==
According to the United States Census Bureau, the Vineyard Lake CDP has an area of 3.43 square miles (8.88 km^{2}), of which 2.56 square miles (6.63 km^{2}) is land and 0.87 square miles (2.25 km^{2}) (25.36%) is water.

The community is in southeastern Jackson County, in the southeast corner of Columbia Township and the southwest corner of Norvell Township. It is bordered to the south by Cambridge Township in Lenawee County. The CDP surrounds Vineyard Lake, a natural water body along the River Raisin. The CDP includes the unincorporated communities of Sunset Beach and The Heights, each on the east side of the lake.

State highway M-124 forms the northern border of the Vineyard Lake CDP; the highway leads west 2 miles (3 km) to Brooklyn and southeast 5 miles (8 km) to Hayes State Park at Wamplers Lake.

== Demographics ==
Historical population
Census	Pop.	Note	%±
2020	992		—
U.S. Decennial Census
