= Columbia School District (Michigan) =

School district in Michigan, United States

Address
- 11775 Hewitt Road Brooklyn, Jackson County, Michigan, 49230; United States

District information
- Grades: Pre-Kindergarten-12
- Superintendent: Jim Baker
- Schools: 4
- Budget: $22,725,000 2022-2023 expenditures
- NCES District ID: 2606990

Students and staff
- Students: 1,428 (2024-2025)
- Teachers: 91.13 (on an FTE basis) (2024-2025)
- Staff: 192.24 FTE (2024-2025)
- Student–teacher ratio: 15.67 (2024-2025)

Other information
- Website: www.myeagles.org

Columbia School District is a public school district in Jackson County, Michigan. It serves Brooklyn and parts of the townships of Columbia, Liberty, and Norvell. It also serves Cement City and parts of Cambridge Township and Woodstock Township in Lenawee County and southwest Manchester Township in Washtenaw County.

== History ==
Columbia School District's origins lie in the Brooklyn school district. Brooklyn's school building was built in 1875, and Brooklyn High School, now known as Columbia Central High, has existed since at least 1881. In 1925, an addition was built to house the high school. Cement City High School was established in 1931.

Brooklyn Elementary opened in 1952. A new Brooklyn High School was dedicated on February 22, 1956.

Brooklyn, Cement City and Clarklake school districts merged in 1967, forming Columbia School District. Cement City High School closed that year, having merged with Brooklyn High. The new district quickly requested that voters approve a bond issue to construct Columbia Central High School, convert Brooklyn High into a middle school, convert Cement City High into an elementary school, and renovate other schools in the district.

A Christmas program in 1969 christened the new high school's 456-seat auditorium, and the building opened for classes in January 1970. KMM Architects of Ann Arbor designed the building, described by an impressed reporter in the Jackson Citizen Patriot as "a sparkling, futuristic building" with a vibrant color scheme featuring "doe-skin walls throughout set off with burnt umber trim. Service panels, housing clocks and temperature controls are in a bright coral color. Chalk boards are in a number of colors, none of which is black. Window space in the classrooms is kept to a minimum. But, full length doors leading to the outside... let in a considerable amount of light."

Miller Elementary, at 115 East Jackson Street in Cement City, closed in 2011 and combined with Brooklyn Elementary, which was renamed Columbia Elementary.

Between 1998 and 2013, bond issues totaling about $37.5 million were approved by voters to improve and remodel district facilities.

== Schools ==
Schools in Columbia School District
School	Address	Notes
Columbia Central Junior/Senior High School	11775 Hewitt Rd., Brooklyn	Grades 7–12; built 1969
Columbia Upper Elementary	321 School Street, Brooklyn	Grades 3–6; formerly Brooklyn High School; built 1956
Columbia Elementary	320 School Street, Brooklyn	Grades PreK–2; built 1952
Columbia Options High School	4460 N. Lake Road, Clarklake	Alternative education
