= Ernest A. Snow =

American judge

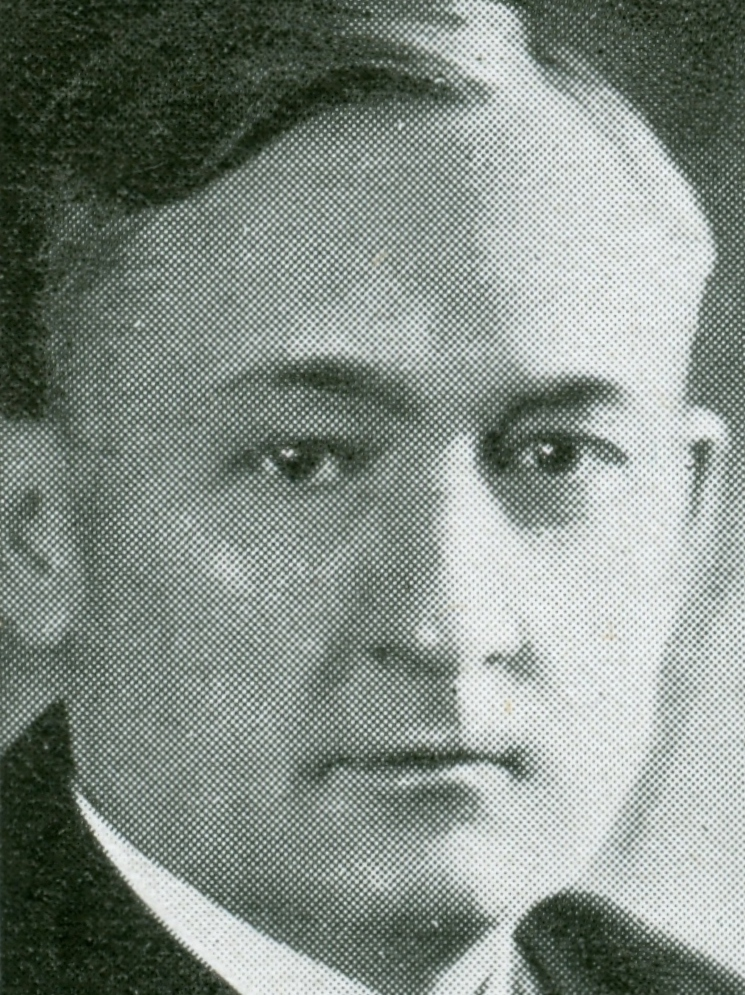
Snow circa 1927

Ernest A. Snow (April 17, 1876 – October 20, 1927) was an American jurist.

Born in Hanover, Michigan, Snow moved to Saginaw, Michigan with his family. He went to University of Michigan and then received his law degree from University of Michigan Law School in 1896. Snow was admitted to the Michigan bar and then practiced law with his father. In 1902, Snow served as Recorder's Court judge and then in 1917, served as Saginaw County, Michigan circuit court judge. In 1907, Snow served as a delegate to the Michigan Constitutional Convention. From 1926 until his death in 1927, Snow served on the Michigan Supreme Court. Snow died of a heart attack in Lansing, Michigan while driving an automobile to Saginaw, Michigan, with his wife and daughter.
