= Jefferson Central School =

Location
- 1332 State Route 10; Jefferson, New York 12093; United States
- Coordinates: 42°28′58″N 74°36′24″W

Information
- Type: Public
- Established: 1817
- School district: Jefferson Central School District
- NCES District ID: 3615720
- Superintendent: Dr. Tarkan Ceng
- CEEB code: 332620
- NCES School ID: 361572001359
- Principal: William Clooney
- Teaching staff: 20.33 (on an FTE basis)
- Grades: PK-12
- Enrollment: 148 (2024-2025)
- Student to teacher ratio: 7.28
- Campus: Rural: Remote
- Colors: Red and White
- Athletics conference: Delaware Mountain League
- Mascot: Jayhawks
- Yearbook: Jeffersonian
- Website: www.jeffersoncs.org

Jefferson Central School is a K-12 school located in Jefferson, New York. Built in 1817 by public subscription. They are the home of the Jayhawks and compete in the Delaware Mountain League
