= Liberty Township, Jackson County, Michigan =

Liberty Township, Michigan
- Civil township
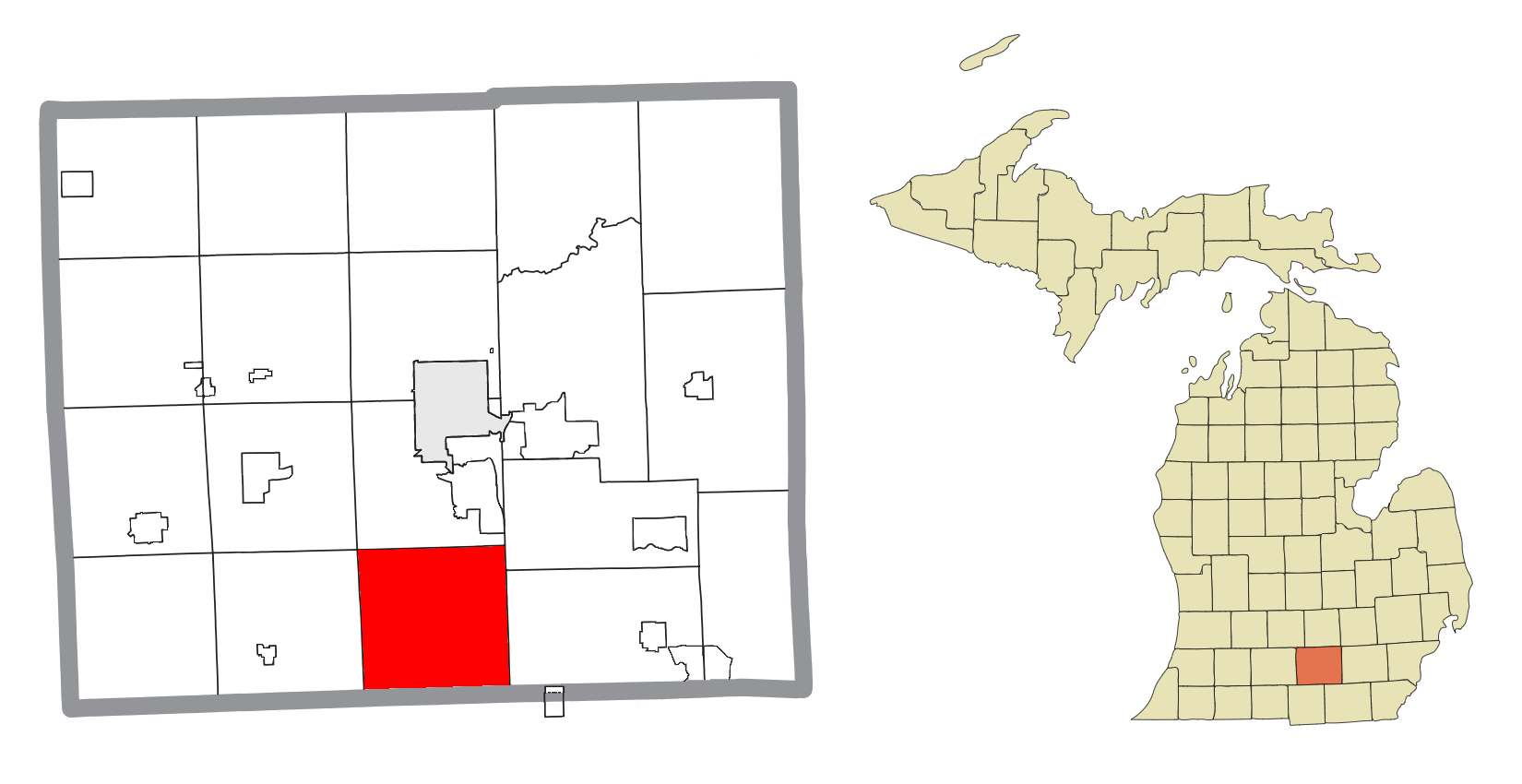
- Location within Jackson County

- Location within the state of Michigan Liberty Township (the United States)
- Coordinates: 42°06′21″N 84°25′02″W
- Country: United States
- State: Michigan
- County: Jackson
- Established: 1837

Government
  - Supervisor: James Spink
  - Clerk: Debbie Sheehan

Area
  - Total: 35.62 sq mi (92.3 km^{2})
  - Land: 34.27 sq mi (88.8 km^{2})
  - Water: 1.35 sq mi (3.5 km^{2})
- Elevation: 1,033 ft (315 m)

Population (2020)
  - Total: 3,059
  - Density: 89.26/sq mi (34.46/km^{2})
- Time zone: UTC-5 (Eastern (EST))
  - Summer (DST): UTC-4 (EDT)
- ZIP code(s): 49201 (Jackson); 49233 (Cement City); 49234 (Clarklake); 49246 (Horton); 49249 (Jerome)
- Area code: 517
- FIPS code: 26-47360
- GNIS feature ID: 1626613
- Website: Official website

Liberty Township is a civil township of Jackson County in the U.S. state of Michigan. As of the 2020 census, the township population was 3,059.

== Communities ==
- Cedar Bank had a post office from 1889 until 1902.

== Geography ==
According to the United States Census Bureau, the township has a total area of 35.62 square miles (92.26 km^{2}), of which 34.27 square miles (88.76 km^{2}) is land and 1.35 square miles (3.50 km^{2}) (3.79%) is water.

Liberty Township is in southern Jackson County and is bordered to the south by Hillsdale County. The southeast corner of the township touches the northwest corner of Lenawee County. U.S. Route 127 forms the eastern border of the township and leads north 9 miles (14 km) to Jackson, the county seat. Most of the township is drained by the Grand River, except for the westernmost part, which is drained by the North Branch of the Kalamazoo River.

== Parks, campgrounds, or preserves ==
- 4-H Camp McGregor is a small campground on Adams Road, with a forest and wetlands, and is on the shore of Crispell Lake.
- Shady Acres Campground is a campground on Crispell Road. It is on the shore of Crispell Lake and has much foliage.
- Grand River Nature Preserve is a nature preserve on Liberty Road. It is one of the headwaters of the Grand River; the other is in Hillsdale County. The area has some woods but is mainly wetland.
- MacCready Reserve is a 408-acre (165 ha) nature preserve on the west side of the township. It has 6.5 miles (10.5 km) of hiking trails. The property used to be owned by Thomas C. MacCready in the late 1800s, then after three generations of family, Douglas, Lynn, and Willis MacCready donated the land to Michigan State University in 2001. The area has five hiking trails and is managed by the Departments of Forestry, Fisheries and Wildlife, MSU Extension, and MSU Land Management Office. The area contains many forests, rolling hills, and wetlands and a natural spring.

== Lakes and ponds ==
- Crispell Lake - Crispell Lake and Round Lake are the largest lakes in Liberty Township. It has some wetlands on parts of it, but is usable for boating; it is fairly deep but nothing over 75 feet (23 m). It has two campgrounds on it, 4-H Camp McGregor, and Crispell Lake Campgrounds. The lake has boat ramps. The lake is on the far east side of the township. Crispell lake has a sister lake right across from her called Mud Lake. They are only about a quarter of a mile apart from each other; sometimes when it rains a lot the two lakes connect. The only thing between them is Springbrook Road and woods and wetland. Crispell Lake is larger than Mud Lake and has boats on it and campgrounds, and has more of a population on it.
- Grand Lake, one of the smaller lakes in Liberty Township, is at the headwaters of the Grand River. A small stream connects it to Mirror Lake upstream, which is about the same size. Mirror Lake used to be called Little Grand Lake and Grand Lake was called Big Grand Lake.
- Mirror Lake is one of the smaller lakes of Liberty Township; it connects with Grand Lake downstream. Mirror Lake used to be called Little Grand Lake, and Grand Lake was called Big Grand Lake. The lake has much of its population on the west shore and south shores; the north and east shore are wilder.
- Mud Lake is one of the larger lakes of Liberty Township. It is not very deep—maybe 20 feet (6.1 m) in some areas. It is sometimes considered a swamp because so many lily pads are on it in the summer, and no boats are ever on it. There are only a few houses on it, so it is pretty much all wildlife, with many waterfowl birds on it in the summer. It is one of the most scenic lakes in the township. Mud Lake has a sister lake called Crispell Lake, only a quarter of a mile away. They sometimes connect in the summer by a small creek when it rains a lot. Springbrook Road, woods, and wetlands are the only things between them.
- Round Lake – Round Lake or Crispell Lake are the largest lakes in Liberty Township. Round Lake has more population on it than any other lake in Liberty Township, as the whole lake has houses around it, and it is fairly deep. Boats are allowed on the lake, and there are boat ramps and docks on the lake. There is also a public beach and playground, and tables. Round Lake's west shore is on the border between Liberty Township and Hanover Township.
- Skiff Lake is one of the larger lakes of the township and one of the least populated. It may be the most scenic lake in the township, with many pine trees along the shores, and a few islands. A small stream leaves the lake and connects to the Grand River.

== Demographics ==
As of the census of 2000, there were 2,903 people, 1,073 households, and 857 families residing in the township. The population density was 83.5 inhabitants per square mile (32.2/km^{2}). There were 1,186 housing units at an average density of 34.1 per square mile (13.2/km^{2}). The racial makeup of the township was 97.97% White, 0.14% African American, 0.28% Native American, 0.38% Asian, 0.41% from other races, and 0.83% from two or more races. Hispanic or Latino of any race were 1.10% of the population.

There were 1,073 households, out of which 34.6% had children under the age of 18 living with them, 70.5% were married couples living together, 5.6% had a female householder with no husband present, and 20.1% were non-families. 16.5% of all households were made up of individuals, and 6.0% had someone living alone who was 65 years of age or older. The average household size was 2.69 and the average family size was 3.02.

In the township the population was spread out, with 25.7% under the age of 18, 5.9% from 18 to 24, 27.9% from 25 to 44, 27.2% from 45 to 64, and 13.3% who were 65 years of age or older. The median age was 40 years. For every 100 females, there were 103.1 males. For every 100 females age 18 and over, there were 99.8 males.

The median income for a household in the township was $55,046, and the median income for a family was $59,135. Males had a median income of $46,842 versus $29,323 for females. The per capita income for the township was $27,433. About 1.7% of families and 2.9% of the population were below the poverty line, including 3.8% of those under age 18 and 1.8% of those age 65 or over.
