= Grass Lake Community Schools =

School district in Michigan

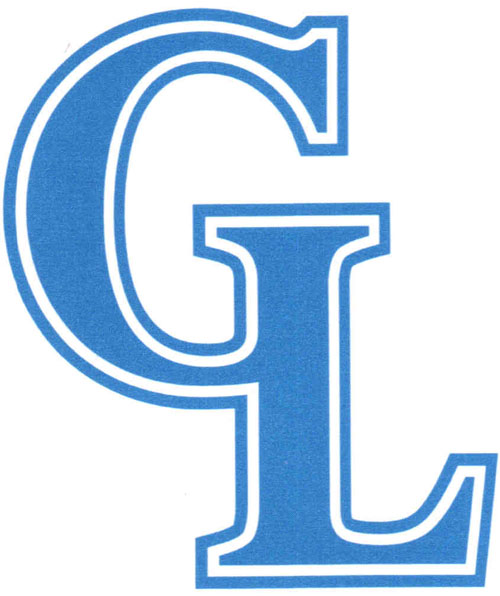

Address
- 899 South Union Street Grass Lake, Jackson County, Michigan, 49240; United States
- Coordinates: 42.2489327°N 84.2025157°W

District information
- Grades: PreKindergarten–12
- Superintendent: Nicholas Angel
- Schools: 3
- Budget: $19,925,000 2023–2024 expenditures
- NCES District ID: 2616830

Students and staff
- Students: 1,334 (2024–2025)
- Teachers: 75.66 (on an FTE basis) (2024–2025)
- Staff: 155.72 FTE (2024–2025)
- Student–teacher ratio: 17.63 (2024–2025)
- District mascot: Warriors
- Colors: Blue, White & Gold

Other information
- Website: www.grasslakeschools.com

Grass Lake Community Schools is a public school district headquartered in Grass Lake, Michigan. The district is mostly in Jackson County and includes most of Grass Lake Charter Township, and portions of Leoni and Waterloo townships. A portion of the district is in Sharon Township, Washtenaw County.

== History ==
George Long Elementary School was completed in fall 1954. The current Grass Lake High School opened in fall 2003.

Its predecessor, formerly the junior/senior high school, then became the district's middle school. When that building was completed around 1959, the editors of the yearbook summarized their feelings about moving from the old high school, built in 1863, to the new:

Students look forward to classes in the new building, but we will not soon forget the good times we have had here. We poked a lot of fun at our century old building, we grumbled about the long climb to study hall, we laughed when the floor shook and the lights swayed, we cheered at pep meetings and basketball games, and we crowded the halls before classes.

== Schools ==
Schools in Grass Lake Community Schools district
School	Address	Notes
Grass Lake High School Grass Lake High School	11500 Warrior Trail, Grass Lake	Grades 9-12
Grass Lake Middle School	1000 Grass Lake Road, Grass Lake	Grades 6-8
George Long Elementary School	829 South Union Street, Grass Lake	Grades K-5
Little Warriors Preschool and Childcare		Preschool and childcare

== See also ==
- List of school districts in Michigan
