= Jayhawk, California =

Unincorporated community in California, United States

Jayhawk
- Unincorporated community
- Location in California Jayhawk (the United States)
- Coordinates: 38°43′53″N 120°57′59″W
- Country: United States
- State: California
- County: El Dorado
- Elevation: 1,161 ft (354 m)

Jayhawk (formerly, Jay Hawk) was a former settlement in El Dorado County, California, United States. It was located 6.5 miles (10 km) southwest of Coloma, at an elevation of 1161 feet (354 m).

A post office operated at Jay Hawk from 1860 to 1865.

Jayhawk was named for settlers from Missouri ("Jayhawks") who established the town. By 1883 Jayhawk was defunct. The Jayhawk Cemetery remains today.
