= Vandercook Lake High School =

Location
- 1000 East Golf Ave; Jackson, Michigan 49203; United States
- Coordinates: 42°12′01″N 84°23′25″W

Information
- Type: High school
- School district: Vandercook Lake Public Schools
- NCES School ID: 263465007043
- Principal: Renee Rudloff
- Staff: 18.01 (on an FTE basis)
- Enrollment: 294 (2023–24)
- Student to teacher ratio: 16.32
- Colors: Red; White
- Athletics conference: Cascades Conference
- Nickname: Jayhawks
- Website: Vandercook Lake High School

Vandercook Lake High School is a high school in Jackson, Michigan, United States. It is the home of the Jayhawk and they compete in the Cascades Conference.
