= Hanover, Michigan =

- Village
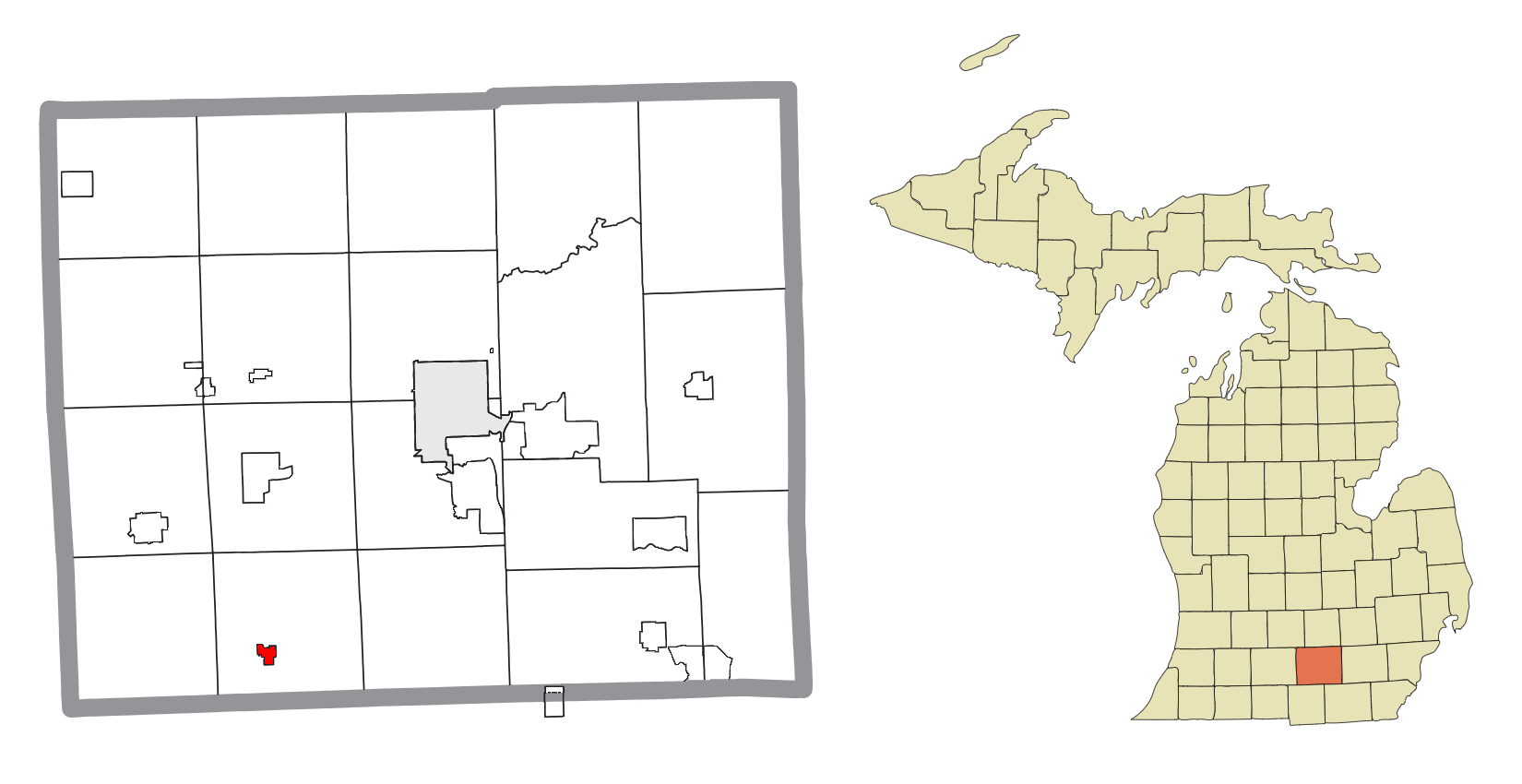
- Location within Jackson County

- Location within the state of Michigan
- Coordinates: 42°06′05″N 84°33′10″W
- Country: United States
- State: Michigan
- County: Jackson
- Township: Hanover
- Established: Schools: Hanover horton elementary school, Hanover horton middle School, Hanover horton high school

Government
  - Village President: Michael Medley

Area
  - Total: 0.44 sq mi (1.13 km^{2})
  - Land: 0.42 sq mi (1.09 km^{2})
  - Water: 0.015 sq mi (0.04 km^{2})
- Elevation: 1,120 ft (340 m)

Population (2020)
  - Total: 472
  - Density: 1,123.9/sq mi (433.93/km^{2})
- Time zone: UTC-5 (Eastern (EST))
  - Summer (DST): UTC-4 (EDT)
- ZIP code(s): 49241
- Area code: 517
- FIPS code: 26-36380
- GNIS feature ID: 0627738

Hanover is a village in Jackson County in the U.S. state of Michigan. As of the 2020 census, Hanover had a population of 472. The village is located within Hanover Township.

== Geography ==
According to the United States Census Bureau, the village has a total area of 0.44 square miles (1.14 km^{2}), of which 0.42 square miles (1.09 km^{2}) is land and 0.02 square miles (0.05 km^{2}) (4.55%) is water.

== Demographics ==
Historical population
Census	Pop.	Note	%±
1880	300		—
1890	363		21.0%
1900	378		4.1%
1910	364		−3.7%
1920	350		−3.8%
1930	375		7.1%
1940	402		7.2%
1950	377		−6.2%
1960	449		19.1%
1970	513		14.3%
1980	490		−4.5%
1990	481		−1.8%
2000	424		−11.9%
2010	441		4.0%
2020	472		7.0%
U.S. Decennial Census

=== 2010 census ===
As of the census of 2010, there were 441 people, 164 households, and 117 families living in the village. The population density was 1,050.0 inhabitants per square mile (405.4/km^{2}). There were 186 housing units at an average density of 442.9 per square mile (171.0/km^{2}). The racial makeup of the village was 95.7% White, 0.9% African American, 0.5% Native American, 0.7% from other races, and 2.3% from two or more races. Hispanic or Latino of any race were 4.3% of the population.

There were 164 households, of which 41.5% had children under the age of 18 living with them, 48.2% were married couples living together, 17.7% had a female householder with no husband present, 5.5% had a male householder with no wife present, and 28.7% were non-families. 25.0% of all households were made up of individuals, and 10.4% had someone living alone who was 65 years of age or older. The average household size was 2.69 and the average family size was 3.17.

The median age in the village was 32.1 years. 32% of residents were under the age of 18; 9.5% were between the ages of 18 and 24; 26.1% were from 25 to 44; 22.5% were from 45 to 64; and 10% were 65 years of age or older. The gender makeup of the village was 47.6% male and 52.4% female.

=== 2000 census ===
As of the census of 2000, there were 424 people, 155 households, and 121 families living in the village. The population density was 1,031.2 inhabitants per square mile (398.1/km^{2}). There were 164 housing units at an average density of 398.9 per square mile (154.0/km^{2}). The racial makeup of the village was 98.82% White, 0.94% African American and 0.24% Native American.

There were 155 households, out of which 43.2% had children under the age of 18 living with them, 54.2% were married couples living together, 16.8% had a female householder with no husband present, and 21.9% were non-families. 19.4% of all households were made up of individuals, and 8.4% had someone living alone who was 65 years of age or older. The average household size was 2.74 and the average family size was 3.07.

In the village, the population was spread out, with 32.1% under the age of 18, 9.0% from 18 to 24, 28.5% from 25 to 44, 18.4% from 45 to 64, and 12.0% who were 65 years of age or older. The median age was 33 years. For every 100 females, there were 94.5 males. For every 100 females age 18 and over, there were 98.6 males.

The median income for a household in the village was $38,750, and the median income for a family was $39,167. Males had a median income of $35,833 versus $25,625 for females. The per capita income for the village was $13,254. About 17.5% of families and 18.7% of the population were below the poverty line, including 27.6% of those under age 18 and 13.3% of those age 65 or over.

== Attractions ==
The Lee Conklin Organ Museum is the main attraction within the town, displaying over 100 fully restored and working antique reed organs. Special events include Rust N' Dust Days, Fourth of July Tractor Pulls and October Corn Mazes. Hanover-Horton 4th of July Celebration also includes a parade, 5 mile run and fireworks.

== Notable people ==
- Homer Folks, sociologist and social welfare advocate
- Dean Hudnutt, Olympian
- Ernest A. Snow, Michigan Supreme Court justice, was born in Hanover.
