= Michigan Center Jr/Sr High School =

Location
- 400 South State Street; Michigan Center, Michigan 49254; United States; 42°13′24″N 84°20′19″W

Information
- Type: Public
- Established: 1869
- Superintendent: Brady Cook
- Principal: Lisa Haynes, Troy Allen & Robert Decoster
- Grades: 7-12
- Enrollment: 642 (2023-2024)
- Colors: Red and Grey
- Athletics conference: Cascade Conference
- Nickname: Cardinals
- Rivals: East Jackson High School Grass Lake High School Napoleon High School
- Website: www.mccardinals.org/jhsh/index

Michigan Center Jr/Sr High School is a public secondary school in Leoni Township, Michigan Center, Michigan, United States.

== Demographics ==
The demographic breakdown of the 602 students enrolled in 2021-22 was:

- Male - 53.98%
- Female - 46.01%
- Asian - 0.6%
- Black - 1.3%
- Hispanic - 3.6%
- White - 88.2%
- Multiracial - 6.1%

== Sports History ==
Michigan Center plays in the Cascade Conference, which includes schools in and around the Jackson Area. Schools included in the Cascade Conference are as follows:

Cascades East Members:

- East Jackson High School
- Grass Lake High School
- Leslie High School
- Manchester High School
- Michigan Center Jr/Sr High School
- Napoleon High School

Cascades West Members:

- Addison High School
- Columbia Central High School
- Jonesville High School
- Hanover-Horton High School
- Homer High School
- Vandercook Lake High School

Conference Championships:

- Football: 21x Conference Champions
- Boys' Basketball: 18x Conference Champions
- Baseball: 29x Conference Champions
- Boys' Track: 13x Conference Champions
- Girls' Track: 3x Conference Champions
- Girls' Basketball: 15x Conference Champion
- Girls' Golf: 2x Conference Champions
- Softball: 9x Conference Champions
- Wrestling: 3x Conference Champions
- Boys' Cross Country: 4x Conference Champions
- Girls' Cross Country: 3x Conference Champions
- Boys' Golf: 4x Conference Champions
- Cheerleading: 12x Conference Champions
- Volleyball: 2010 Conference Champions

District Championships:

- Football: 2x District Champions
- Boys' Basketball: 11x District Champions
- Baseball: 12x District Champions
- Girls' Basketball: 19x District Champions
- Softball: 9x District Champions
- Volleyball: 2x District Champions
- Wrestling: 8x District Champions
- Cheerleading: 4x District Champions
- Boys' Soccer: 2021 District Champions

Regional Championships:

- Baseball: 3x Regional Champions
- Boys' Basketball: 2x Champions
- Boys' Golf: 2x Regional Champions
- Cheerleading: 4x Regional Champions
- Football: 2021 Regional Champions
- Girls' Basketball: 6x Regional Champions
- Girls' Golf: 2020 Regional Champions
- Wrestling: 1992 Regional Champions
- Boys' Cross Country: 1975 Regional Champions

State Runner-Up:

- Girls' Basketball: 2x State Runner-Up(2003, 2005)
- Baseball: 2006 State Runner-Up

State Championships:

- Football: 1936 State Champions
- Boys' Basketball: 1945 State Champions
- Cheerleading: 5x State Champions(2009, 2011, 2012, 2013, 2014)
