= Grass Lake High School =

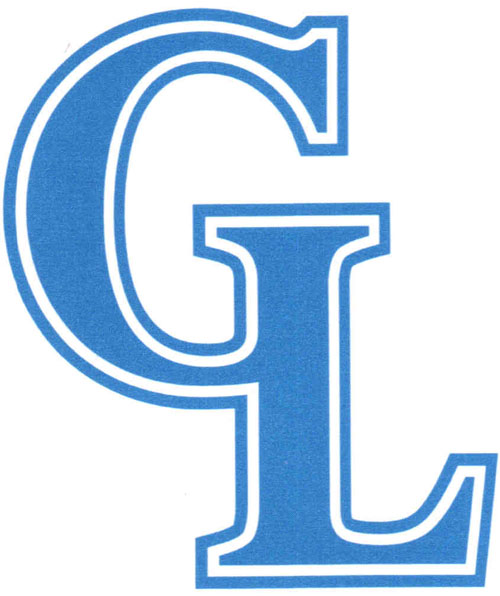

Location
- 11500 Warrior Trail; Grass Lake, Michigan 49240; United States; 42°14′33″N 84°12′02″W

Information
- Type: public secondary
- School district: Grass Lake Community Schools
- Teaching staff: 19.90 (FTE)
- Grades: 9 - 12
- Enrollment: 394 (2024-2025)
- Student to teacher ratio: 19.80
- Colors: Navy and white
- Nickname: Warriors
- ACT Composite Score average: 19.8
- Conference: Cascades Conference
- 4 year Graduation Rate: 93.7%
- Website: www.grasslakeschools.com/glhs

Grass Lake High School is a public high school in Grass Lake, Michigan, United States. It has about 400 students. The school, though it has been in multiple locations over the years, can trace its institutional history back to 1863.

== Notable people ==
Author Maritta Wolff, who wrote the 1941 bestseller Whistle Stop and other books, was a graduate of Grass Lake High School.

== Athletics ==
=== Baseball ===
State Championships: 1979-1980, 1987-1988, 2008. In 1998-1999 team had the most HR's In GL history. 1985 State runners up, loss in extra innings.

=== Wrestling ===
State Championships: 1985, 1986, 1989

=== Girls Track & Field ===
State Championships: 1977, 1978

=== Boys Track & Field ===
State Championships: 1969, 1970, 2021, 2022

=== Boys Cross Country ===
State Championships: 1993, 1995, 1996, 1997, 1998

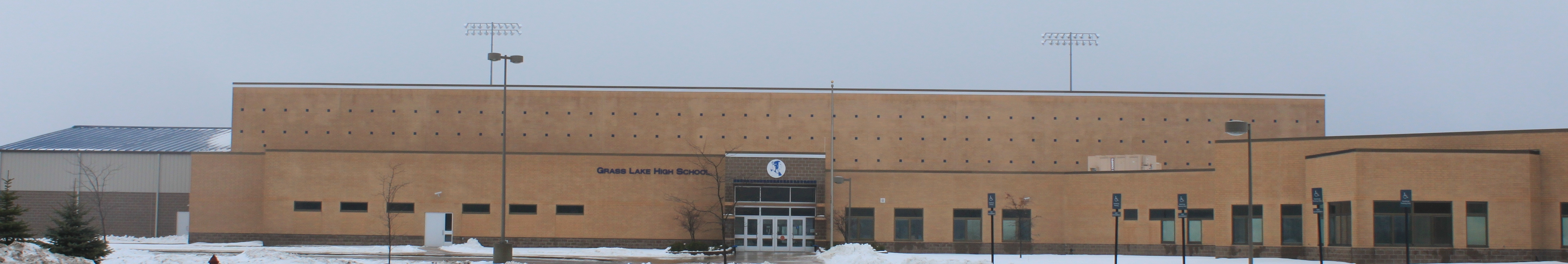
Grass Lake High School
