= Jackson County, Michigan =

County in Michigan, United States

- County
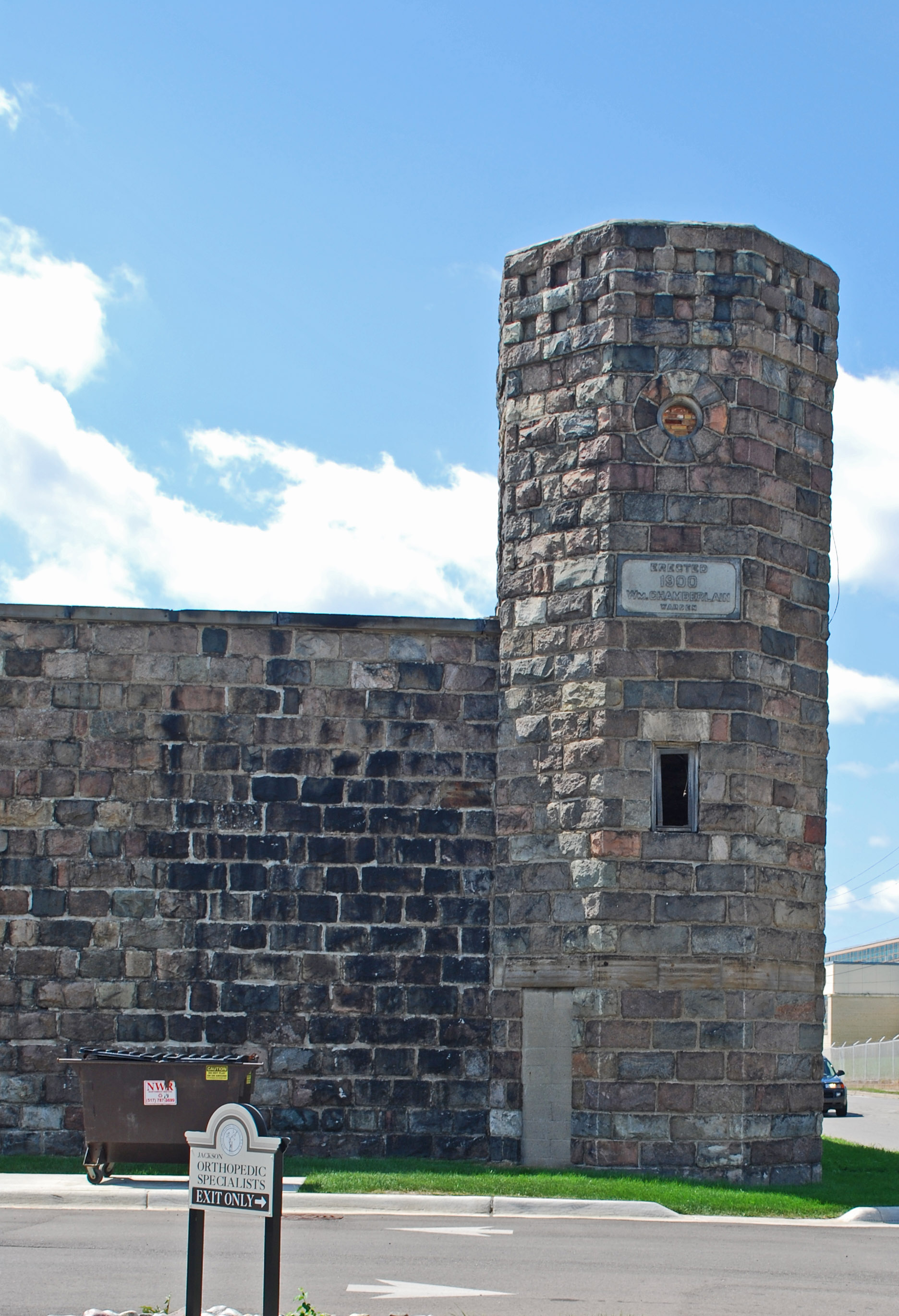
- Michigan State Prison

- Seal

- Location within the U.S. state of Michigan
- Coordinates: 42°15′N 84°25′W
- Country: United States
- State: Michigan
- Organized: August 1, 1832
- Named for: Andrew Jackson
- Seat: Jackson
- Largest city: Jackson

Area
  - Total: 723 sq mi (1,870 km^{2})
  - Land: 702 sq mi (1,820 km^{2})
  - Water: 22 sq mi (57 km^{2}) 3.0%

Population (2020)
  - Total: 160,366
  - Estimate (2025): 159,552 ▼
  - Density: 228/sq mi (88.2/km^{2})
- Time zone: UTC−5 (Eastern)
  - Summer (DST): UTC−4 (EDT)
- Congressional district: 5th
- Website: www.mijackson.org

Jackson County is located in the U.S. state of Michigan. The population of the county was 160,366 as of the 2020 census. Its county seat is the city of Jackson. The county was set off in 1829 and organized in 1832. It is named for U.S. President Andrew Jackson and considered to be one of Michigan's "Cabinet counties", named for members of Jackson's Cabinet. Jackson County comprises the Jackson, MI Metropolitan Statistical Area. The Jackson County Courthouse was designed by Claire Allen, a prominent southern Michigan architect. Jackson County is also home to the Michigan Whitetail Hall of Fame.

== Geography ==
According to the U.S. Census Bureau, the county has a total area of 723 square miles (1,870 km^{2}), of which 702 square miles (1,820 km^{2}) is land and 22 square miles (57 km^{2}) (3.0%) is water.

=== Rivers ===
==== Grand River ====
The Grand River is Michigan's longest river. It starts in Somerset Township in Hillsdale County and Liberty Township in Jackson County. It then flows through a small part of Columbia Township, into Summit township, and then right through the Jackson city limits. It then flows through Blackman Charter Township and then Rives Township and Tompkins Township before entering Ingham County, Eaton County, Clinton County, Ionia County, Kent County, Ottawa County and into the city of Grand Haven where it empties into Lake Michigan. The river is 260 miles (420 km) long; its watershed drains an area of 5,572 miles (8,967 km) including 18 counties and 158 townships.

==== Kalamazoo River ====
The Kalamazoo River is made up of the north and south branches.

The north branch starts in Jackson County in Hanover Township. It starts in Pine Hills Lake and Farwell Lake and flows through a small part of Liberty Township and then back into Hanover Township. It then flows into Spring Arbor Township and Concord Township. It then flows out of Jackson County and into Calhoun County before it goes through the town of Albion where the north branch connects with the south branch and they form to be one river.

The south branch starts in the wetlands near the town North Adams in Hillsdale County and flows through the rest of Hillsdale County. It enters Jackson County and goes through a small part of Hanover Township before reentering Hillsdale County and then reentering Jackson County where it goes through Pulaski Township. It then enters Calhoun County and connects with the northern branch when it reaches the town of Albion.

When the south branch and north branch connect to form just the Kalamazoo River, it then flows through the rest of Calhoun County. It then enters Kalamazoo County and then Allegan County. When it reaches the towns of Saugatuck and Douglas it stops and enters Lake Michigan. In total the Kalamazoo River is 166 miles (267 km) long, and its watershed drains a total of 2,020 miles (3,250 km) and drains into eight counties.

=== Adjacent counties ===
- Livingston County (northeast)
- Ingham County (north)
- Eaton County (northwest)
- Washtenaw County (east)
- Calhoun County (west)
- Lenawee County (southeast)
- Hillsdale County (southwest)

== Transportation ==
=== Transit ===
- Amtrak Wolverine at Jackson station
- Greyhound Lines
- Indian Trails
- Jackson Area Transportation Authority

=== Highways ===
- I-94
  - BL I-94 (Jackson)
  - BL I-94 (Albion)
- US 127
  - Bus. US 127 (Jackson)
- M-50
- M-52
- M-60
- M-99
- M-106
- M-124

== Government ==
The county government operates the county jail, maintains township roads, operates the major local courts, keeps files of deeds and mortgages, maintains vital records, administers public health regulations, and participates with the state in the provision of welfare and other social services. The county board of commissioners controls the budget but has only limited authority to make laws or ordinances. In Michigan, most local government functions – police and fire, building and zoning, tax assessment, street maintenance, etc. – are the responsibility of individual cities and townships.

=== Elected officials ===
- Michigan State House of Representatives, State Representative District 64: Julie Alexander (R)
- Michigan State House of Representatives, State Representative District 65: Mike Shirkey (R)
- Michigan State Senate, State Senate District 17: Randy Richardville President pro tempore (R)
- Michigan State Senate, State Senate District 19: Mike Nofs (R)
- Prosecuting Attorney: Jerry Jarzynka
- Sheriff: Gary R. Schuette
- County Clerk/Register of Deeds: Cierra Sowle
- County Treasurer: Karen Coffman
- Drain Commissioner: Geoffrey W. Snyder
- County Surveyor: Dean R. Gutekunst
- County Commissioners: Tony Bair District 1, Margie Walz District 2, Vice Chairman Corey Kennedy District 3, Philip Duckham District 4, Chairman James Shotwell Jr. District 5, Earl Poleski District 6, John Willis District 7, Darius Williams District 8, and Ray Snell District 9.

(information as of February 21, 2013)

== Politics ==
Jackson County is rather conservative for an urban county. With the exceptions of 1964 and 2008 (by less than 2.5%), Jackson County has voted for the Republican nominee in every presidential election since 1940, and is thus considered a reliable Republican stronghold.

United States presidential election results for Jackson County, Michigan
Year	Republican		Democratic		Third party(ies)	
Year	No.	%	No.	%	No.	%
1884	4,804	43.86%	5,452	49.78%	696	6.36%
1888	5,646	48.82%	5,170	44.70%	750	6.48%
1892	5,130	45.02%	5,005	43.92%	1,261	11.07%
1896	6,208	47.51%	6,498	49.73%	361	2.76%
1900	6,325	49.01%	6,203	48.06%	378	2.93%
1904	7,778	62.89%	4,131	33.40%	458	3.70%
1908	6,770	54.12%	5,226	41.77%	514	4.11%
1912	2,456	18.68%	4,283	32.58%	6,406	48.73%
1916	6,938	44.96%	8,058	52.22%	436	2.83%
1920	15,922	64.90%	7,789	31.75%	823	3.35%
1924	19,640	69.18%	5,639	19.86%	3,111	10.96%
1928	25,080	76.71%	7,462	22.82%	151	0.46%
1932	16,150	47.88%	16,584	49.17%	996	2.95%
1936	16,350	44.81%	19,288	52.86%	848	2.32%
1940	24,558	61.49%	15,170	37.98%	213	0.53%
1944	22,992	61.97%	13,859	37.36%	249	0.67%
1948	21,449	61.22%	12,809	36.56%	779	2.22%
1952	32,810	68.20%	15,065	31.32%	230	0.48%
1956	35,453	69.41%	15,479	30.30%	147	0.29%
1960	34,660	62.14%	20,995	37.64%	124	0.22%
1964	20,940	42.52%	28,219	57.30%	88	0.18%
1968	27,828	53.66%	18,205	35.11%	5,824	11.23%
1972	34,220	62.33%	19,350	35.24%	1,333	2.43%
1976	32,873	56.23%	24,726	42.30%	858	1.47%
1980	33,749	53.93%	23,685	37.85%	5,146	8.22%
1984	40,133	68.27%	18,340	31.20%	312	0.53%
1988	33,885	60.37%	21,865	38.96%	377	0.67%
1992	25,424	39.33%	23,686	36.64%	15,534	24.03%
1996	24,987	44.42%	24,633	43.79%	6,636	11.80%
2000	32,066	51.76%	28,160	45.46%	1,720	2.78%
2004	40,029	55.75%	31,025	43.21%	741	1.03%
2008	35,692	47.79%	37,480	50.19%	1,507	2.02%
2012	36,298	52.09%	32,301	46.35%	1,086	1.56%
2016	39,793	56.75%	25,795	36.78%	4,537	6.47%
2020	47,372	58.47%	31,995	39.49%	1,647	2.03%
2024	50,199	59.88%	32,348	38.59%	1,280	1.53%

United States Senate election results for Jackson County, Michigan1
Year	Republican		Democratic		Third party(ies)	
Year	No.	%	No.	%	No.	%
2024	47,562	57.72%	32,200	39.08%	2,643	3.21%

Michigan Gubernatorial election results for Jackson County
Year	Republican		Democratic		Third party(ies)	
Year	No.	%	No.	%	No.	%
2022	34,439	53.22%	29,011	44.84%	1,255	1.94%

== Demographics ==
Historical population
Census	Pop.	Note	%±
1840	13,130		—
1850	19,431		48.0%
1860	26,671		37.3%
1870	36,047		35.2%
1880	42,031		16.6%
1890	45,031		7.1%
1900	48,222		7.1%
1910	53,426		10.8%
1920	72,539		35.8%
1930	92,304		27.2%
1940	93,108		0.9%
1950	108,168		16.2%
1960	131,994		22.0%
1970	143,274		8.5%
1980	151,495		5.7%
1990	149,756		−1.1%
2000	158,422		5.8%
2010	160,248		1.2%
2020	160,366		0.1%
2025 (est.)	159,552	▼	−0.5%
U.S. Decennial Census; 1790-1960 1900-1990; 1990-2000 2010-2019

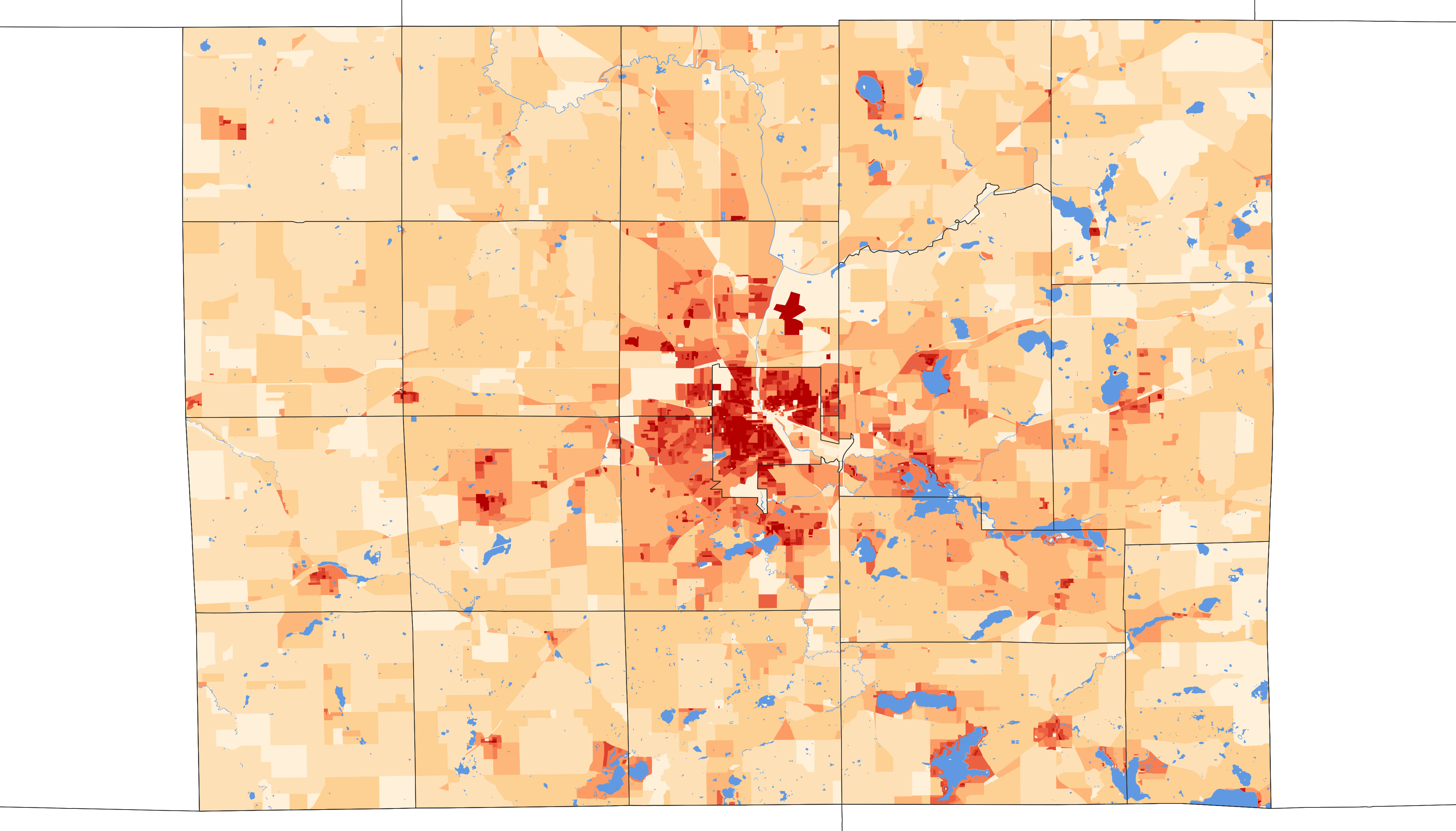
2020 population density of Jackson County MI by census block

=== Racial and ethnic composition ===
Jackson County, Michigan – Racial and ethnic composition Note: the US Census treats Hispanic/Latino as an ethnic category. This table excludes Latinos from the racial categories and assigns them to a separate category. Hispanics/Latinos may be of any race.
Race / Ethnicity (NH = Non-Hispanic)	Pop 1980	Pop 1990	Pop 2000	Pop 2010	Pop 2020	% 1980	% 1990	% 2000	% 2010	% 2020
White alone (NH)	137,603	134,283	138,528	137,588	131,097	90.83%	89.67%	87.44%	85.86%	81.75%
Black or African American alone (NH)	10,730	11,822	12,396	12,560	12,385	7.08%	7.89%	7.82%	7.84%	7.72%
Native American or Alaska Native alone (NH)	496	627	588	521	515	0.33%	0.42%	0.37%	0.33%	0.32%
Asian alone (NH)	522	641	835	1,122	1,475	0.34%	0.43%	0.53%	0.70%	0.92%
Native Hawaiian or Pacific Islander alone (NH)	x	x	55	27	30	x	x	0.03%	0.02%	0.02%
Other race alone (NH)	337	80	174	145	473	0.22%	0.05%	0.11%	0.09%	0.29%
Mixed race or Multiracial (NH)	x	x	2,353	3,448	8,207	x	x	1.49%	2.15%	5.12%
Hispanic or Latino (any race)	1,807	2,303	3,493	4,837	6,184	1.19%	1.54%	2.20%	3.02%	3.86%
Total	151,495	149,756	158,422	160,248	160,366	100.00%	100.00%	100.00%	100.00%	100.00%

=== 2020 census ===
As of the 2020 census, the county had a population of 160,366. The median age was 41.3 years. 21.2% of residents were under the age of 18 and 18.6% of residents were 65 years of age or older. For every 100 females there were 105.5 males, and for every 100 females age 18 and over there were 105.3 males age 18 and over.

The racial makeup of the county was 83.1% White, 7.9% Black or African American, 0.4% American Indian and Alaska Native, 0.9% Asian, <0.1% Native Hawaiian and Pacific Islander, 1.2% from some other race, and 6.5% from two or more races. Hispanic or Latino residents of any race comprised 3.9% of the population.

52.7% of residents lived in urban areas, while 47.3% lived in rural areas.

There were 62,567 households in the county, of which 28.1% had children under the age of 18 living in them. Of all households, 45.4% were married-couple households, 19.8% were households with a male householder and no spouse or partner present, and 26.8% were households with a female householder and no spouse or partner present. About 29.3% of all households were made up of individuals and 12.9% had someone living alone who was 65 years of age or older.

There were 69,025 housing units, of which 9.4% were vacant. Among occupied housing units, 74.1% were owner-occupied and 25.9% were renter-occupied. The homeowner vacancy rate was 1.7% and the rental vacancy rate was 8.8%.

=== 2000 census ===
As of the census of 2000, there were 158,422 people, 58,168 households, and 40,833 families residing in the county. The population density was 224 people per square mile (86 people/km^{2}). There were 62,906 housing units at an average density of 89 per square mile (34/km^{2}). The racial makeup of the county was 88.54% White, 7.92% Black or African American, 0.40% Native American, 0.53% Asian, 0.04% Pacific Islander, 0.83% from other races, and 1.74% from two or more races. 2.20% of the population were Hispanic or Latino of any race. 24.3% were of English, 21.7% of German, 11.5% American, 9.9% Irish and 8.1% Polish ancestry according to the 2012 American Community Survey. 95.9% spoke only English at home, while 2.1% spoke Spanish.

There were 58,168 households, out of which 33.50% had children under the age of 18 living with them, 53.80% were married couples living together, 12.00% had a female householder with no husband present, and 29.80% were non-families. 24.60% of all households were made up of individuals, and 9.60% had someone living alone who was 65 years of age or older. The average household size was 2.55 and the average family size was 3.03.

In the county, 25.60% of the population was under the age of 18, 8.10% was from 18 to 24, 30.40% from 25 to 44, 23.00% from 45 to 64, and 12.90% was 65 years of age or older. The median age was 37 years. For every 100 females there were 104.20 males. For every 100 females age 18 and over, there were 103.70 males.

The median income for a household in the county was $43,171, and the median income for a family was $50,970. Males had a median income of $38,919 versus $26,448 for females. The per capita income for the county was $20,171. About 6.50% of families and 9.00% of the population were below the poverty line, including 12.40% of those under age 18 and 6.10% of those age 65 or over.

== Parks and recreation ==
- Blackman Park: a small city park on Michigan Avenue in the middle of the city of Jackson, contains a fountain in the middle of the park honoring soldiers from the Civil War, a few benches and some foliage.
- Bloomfield Park: a small park in the Jackson city limits on Michigan Avenue. There are picnic tables, basketball courts, tennis courts, baseball/softball fields and a small playground.
- Falling Waters Trail: 10.5-mile asphalt rail-trail follows the old rail bed of the former Michigan Central Railroad from Weatherwax Road in Jackson to the village of Concord. The trail has been dedicated as a Jackson County Park. The trail is mostly rural, with only a few road crossings. It also crosses the Lime Lake County Park (5501 Teft Road) where you can drop a line for fish. The trail continues as the Intercity Trail for another 3.4 miles from Weatherwax Road to Morrell Street.
- YMCA Storer Camp: a campground in Napoleon Township in the eastern part of the county. It is located on Stony Lake in a wooded area with wetlands.
- Camp Teetonkah: a campground for Boy Scout troops. It was created in 1912 and is the second oldest Boy Scout camp in America. Usually every spring, all the local Boy Scout troops in the area come and compete against each other for the weekend. The campground is on the shores of Big Wolf Lake and consists of 240 acres (0.97 km^{2}) of forest and wetlands. It has a dining hall and bathrooms with showers. It is located in Leoni Township in the eastern part of the county.
- Sparks Park and The Cascades (AKA Cascade Falls Park): one of the larger parks in the country. The park contains the Cascades Championship Golf Course, one with 18 holes and a short course with 9-hole, as well as two large play structures, basketball court, baseball and softball fields and a popular paved walking path. It is famous for its Cascade Manor House and Cascade Falls (Jackson, Michigan), which is one of the largest man-made waterfalls in the world, with 6 immense fountains, 3 reflecting pools and 16 falls. The park is also home to the Cascades Ice Cream Co. which opens when there is usually still snow on the ground and stays open until October. Every late August, the annual Cascades Civil War Muster is held there. There are some man-made ponds and wetlands with many types of water fowl. In 2012, the urban fishery opened, stocked with blue gill and large mouth bass. This pond features informative signs, a large picnic gazebo and a fishing pier, accessible by wheelchair. Part of it is in the city limits of Jackson, but most is in Summit Township.
- Dahlem Environmental Education Center: is a nature center located in Summit Township in the southern part of the county. It has an educational center, five miles of trails, many ponds, wetlands, and a forest area. A resurfaced 3/8 mile trail has been specially redesigned for visitors with limited mobility. Dahlem is also known to have one of the largest eastern bluebird trails.
- Ella Sharp Park: the largest city park located on 562 acres along the banks of the southwest branch of the Grand River in the city of Jackson. It consists of a golf course, a miniature golf course, a golf learning center, flower gardens, miles of hiking & biking trails, a basketball court, soccer fields, softball fields, the Peter Hurst Planetarium, and the Ella Sharp Museum. The Ella Sharp Park is the host to the annual Jackson Hot Air Jubilee in July.
- Grand River Nature Preserve: a preserve located near Grand Lake where the Grand River starts in the lower part of Jackson County in Liberty Township.
- Green Park: a small park on the northern part of the Jackson city limits in Blackman Township it is right by Interstate 94 (I-94). The Grand River goes through the outskirts of the park, the Penn Central Transportation Company railroad track also goes through the park. An old train engine car lies in the park as a monument. The park consist of some ponds and many water fowl.
- Loomis Park: a small park in the Jackson city limits. It consist of picnic tables, two outdoor basketball courts, two outdoor tennis courts, baseball/softball fields and a large wooden playground. The park also contains the Boos Recreation Center which hosts a variety of classes, events and workshops year-round.
- MacCready Reserve: a fairly large nature preserve on the west side of the township. It has six and a half miles of hiking trails and 408 acres (1.65 km^{2}). The property used to be owned by Thomas C. MacCready in the late 19th century, and after three generations of family, Douglas, Lynn, and Willis MacCready donated the land to Michigan State University in 2001. The area has five hiking trails, some easy and some more difficult ones. The area is managed by the Departments of Forestry, Fisheries and Wildlife, MSU Extension, and MSU Land Management Office. The area contains many forests, rolling hills, and wetlands and even a natural spring. The area is meant to be forest studies and hiking.
- Martin Luther King Center: a full service community center part of the Howard Charles Woods Recreational Complex, a small park in the Jackson city limits. It has picnic tables, a playground, two outdoor basketball courts, a tennis court, two baseball/softball fields and a recreation area with some trees and foliage.
- Meridian Baseline State Park: a historical park in Henrietta Township in the northern part of the county. The park was landlocked until the mid 20teens when the park was made open to the public.
- Portage Lake County Park: a small 6-acre park on Portage lake in the Waterloo State Recreation Area. It is located in Waterloo Township in the eastern part of the county. It consists of picnic areas, grills, playground, a historic pump house, swimming area, boat launch and beaches on Portage Lake.
- Snyder Park: a small park in the small unincorporated village of Horton in Hanover Township in the southwestern part of the county. The park has a gazebo, picnic tables, and a small man-made waterfall that connects to a pond called Mill Pond which is part of the Northern Branch of the Kalamazoo River. The area is also wetland, forest, and the village of Horton.
- Sharonville State Game Area: a wilderness wildlife area consisting of forest and swamps. It is located in Norvell Township in the eastern part of the county and in part of Washtenaw County.
- Twin Pines Campground: a large campground in Pulaski Township in the southwestern part of the county. The campground is on the South Branch Kalamazoo River. There is a playground and a basketball court. The campground allows campers and RVs, as well as traditional camping in a tent. They feature a dining and activity hall. There is the Kalamazoo River, wetlands, and forest. They also offer a canoe livery.
- Vandercook Lake County Park: a small 17-acre park on Vandercook Lake in the village area of Vandercook Lake in Summit Township. It consists of a beach, a swim area, 3 ball diamonds, a boat launch, playground area, fishing area, grills, 2 picnic shelters and modern restrooms.
- Waterloo State Recreation Area: the only State Park in Jackson County. It covers about 21,000-acre (85 km^{2}); it is also the largest State Park in the Lower Peninsula and the third largest in Michigan. The area contains 17 lakes, many ponds and streams, and numerous woods. They have RV or tent camping there. The park offers swimming on Portage Lake, canoeing, fishing, boating, picnicking, and biking. Waterloo State Recreation Area is located in the eastern part of Jackson County and the western part of Washtenaw County.
- William Nixon Memorial Park: a small park in the middle of the city of Jackson. It has skateboard ramps, a public water park, including two large water slides, a full-size inline hockey rink as well as four softball fields, playground equipment and a picnic shelter.
- 4-H Camp McGregor: a small campground, mainly a place for children in Liberty Township. The area has swamps, ponds and forests. It is on the shoreline of Crispell Lake.

== Communities ==
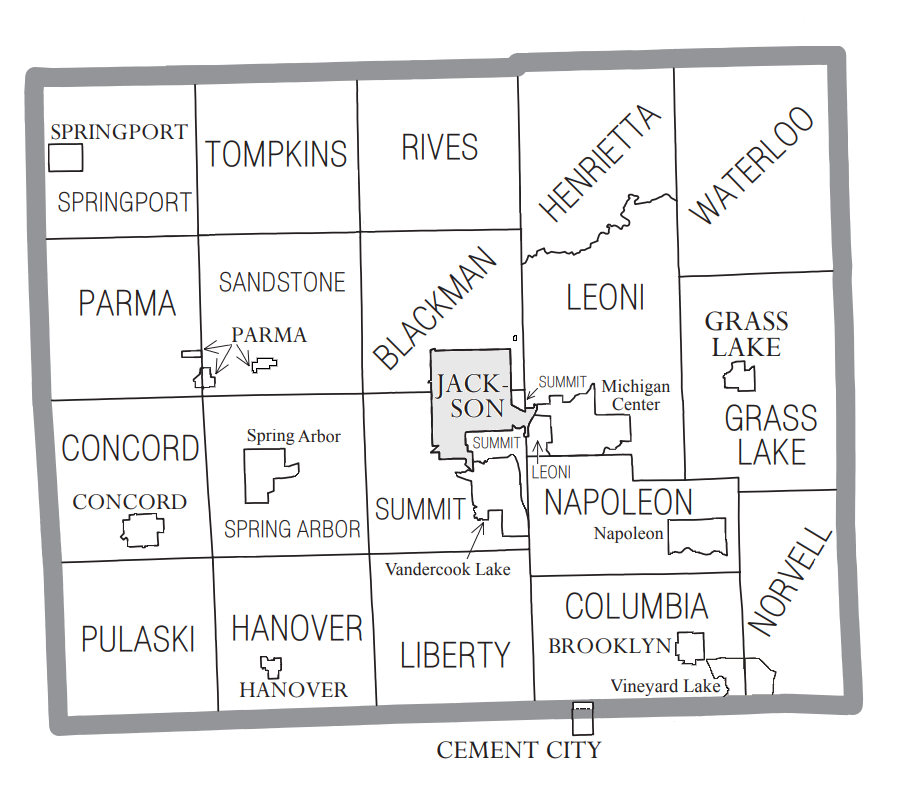
U.S. Census data map showing local municipal boundaries within Jackson County, as well as CDP boundaries. Shaded areas represent incorporated cities.

=== Cities ===
- Jackson (county seat)

=== Villages ===
- Brooklyn
- Cement City (partial)
- Concord
- Grass Lake
- Hanover
- Parma
- Springport

=== Charter townships ===
- Blackman Charter Township
- Grass Lake Charter Township
- Sandstone Charter Township

=== Civil townships ===
- Columbia Township
- Concord Township
- Hanover Township
- Henrietta Township
- Leoni Township
- Liberty Township
- Napoleon Township
- Norvell Township
- Parma Township
- Pulaski Township
- Rives Township
- Spring Arbor Township
- Springport Township
- Summit Township
- Tompkins Township
- Waterloo Township

=== Census-designated places ===
- Michigan Center
- Napoleon
- Spring Arbor
- Vandercook Lake
- Vineyard Lake

=== Other unincorporated communities ===
- Clarklake
- Horton
- Leoni
- Liberty
- Munith
- Norvell
- Pleasant Lake
- Pulaski
- Rives Junction
- Sandstone
- Tompkins
- Waterloo

== Education ==
School districts include:

- Addison Community Schools
- Columbia School District
- Chelsea School District
- Concord Community Schools
- East Jackson Community Schools
- Grass Lake Community Schools
- Hanover-Horton Schools
- Homer Community Schools
- Jackson Public Schools
- Jonesville Community Schools
- Leslie Public Schools
- Litchfield Community Schools
- Manchester Community Schools
- Marshall Public Schools
- Michigan Center School District
- Napoleon Community Schools
- North Adams-Jerome Schools
- Northwest Community Schools
- Springport Public Schools
- Stockbridge Community Schools
- Vandercook Lake Public Schools
- Western School District

== See also ==
- List of Michigan State Historic Sites in Jackson County
- National Register of Historic Places listings in Jackson County, Michigan
