= Michigan's 16th Senate district =

American legislative district

Michigan's 16th State Senate district
Senator
Joe Bellino; R–Monroe
- Demographics: 87.5% White; 2.1% Black; 5.8% Hispanic; 0.3% Asian; 0.1% Native American; 0.4% Other; 3.8% Multiracial
- Population (2024): 270,374

Michigan's 16th Senate district is one of 38 districts in the Michigan Senate. The 16th district was created by the 1850 Michigan Constitution, as the 1835 constitution only permitted a maximum of eight senate districts. It has been represented by Republican Joe Bellino since 2023, succeeding fellow Republican Mike Shirkey.

== Geography ==
District 16 encompasses parts of Hillsdale, Lenawee, and Monroe counties.

=== 2011 Apportionment Plan ===
District 16, as dictated by the 2011 Apportionment Plan, covered Branch, Hillsdale, and Jackson Counties, including the communities of Jackson, Michigan Center, Vandercook Lake, Hillsdale, Jonesville, Coldwater, Bronson, Summit Township, Blackman Township, and Leoni Township.

The district was located entirely within Michigan's 7th congressional district, and overlapped with the 58th, 64th, and 65th districts of the Michigan House of Representatives. It bordered the states of Indiana and Ohio.

== List of senators ==
Senator	Party	Dates	Residence	Notes
Joseph C. Leonard	Democratic	1853–1854	Union City	
Louis T. N. Wilson	Republican	1855–1856	Coldwater	
Frederick Shurtz	Republican	1857–1858	White Pigeon	
Comfort Tyler	Republican	1859–1860	St. Joseph County	
Joseph R. Williams	Republican	1861	Constantine	Died in office.
Henry H. Riley	Democratic	1862	Constantine	
Jonathan G. Wait	Republican	1863–1866	Sturgis	
Warren Chapman	Republican	1867–1868	St. Joseph	
Evan J. Bonine	Republican	1869–1870	Niles	
Lorenzo P. Alexander	Republican	1871–1872	Buchanan	
George M. Dewey	Republican	1873–1874	Hastings	
Asa K. Warren	Republican	1875–1876	Olivet	
Porter K. Perrin	Republican	1877–1878	St. Johns	
John S. Tooker	Republican	1879–1882	Lansing	
Joshua Manwaring	Democratic	1883–1886	Lapeer	
Jonathan W. Babcock	Republican	1887–1888	Lexington	
Robert L. Taylor	Republican	1889–1892	Lapeer	
Peter Doran	Democratic	1893–1894	Grand Rapids	
Julius M. Jamison	Republican	1895–1896	Grand Rapids	
Robert B. Loomis	Republican	1897–1902	Grand Rapids	
David E. Burns	Republican	1903–1904	Grand Rapids	
Andrew Fyfe	Republican	1905–1908	Grand Rapids	
Carl E. Mapes	Republican	1909–1912	Grand Rapids	
Leonard D. Verdier	Republican	1913–1916	Grand Rapids	
Harry C. White	Democratic	1917–1918	Grand Rapids	
Roy M. Watkins	Republican	1919–1920	Grand Rapids	
Eva McCall Hamilton	Republican	1921–1922	Grand Rapids	
Charles R. Sligh	Republican	1923–1924	Grand Rapids	
Howard F. Baxter	Republican	1925–1928	Grand Rapids	
Ernest T. Conlon	Republican	1929–1932	Grand Rapids	
Earl W. Munshaw	Republican	1933–1944	Grand Rapids	Died in office.
Perry W. Greene	Republican	1945–1962	Grand Rapids	
Milton Zaagman	Republican	1963–1964	Grand Rapids	
Robert J. Huber	Republican	1965–1970	Birmingham	
Donald E. Bishop	Republican	1971–1974	Rochester	
Bill Huffman	Democratic	1975–1982	Madison Heights	Resigned.
Dana F. Wilson	Democratic	1982	Hazel Park	
Doug Cruce	Republican	1983–1991	Troy	Resigned.
Michael J. Bouchard	Republican	1991–1994	Birmingham	
Mat J. Dunaskiss	Republican	1995–2002	Lake Orion	
Cameron S. Brown	Republican	2003–2010	Fawn River Township	
Bruce Caswell	Republican	2011–2014	Hillsdale	
Mike Shirkey	Republican	2015–2022	Clarklake	
Joe Bellino	Republican	2023–present	Monroe	

== Recent election results ==
=== 2020s ===
2026 Michigan Senate election
Primary election
Party	Candidate	Votes	%
Republican	Joseph Bellino Jr. (incumbent)	26,257	100
Total votes		26,257	100
Democratic	Deandre Barnes	21,746	100
Total votes		21,746	100
General election
Republican	Joseph Bellino Jr. (incumbent)	74,857	61.75
Democratic	Deandre Barnes	46,372	38.25
Total votes		121,229	100
Republican hold			

2022 Michigan Senate election, District 16
Primary election
Party	Candidate	Votes	%
Republican	Joseph Bellino Jr.	19,018	52.6
Republican	TC Clements	17,103	47.4
Total votes		36,121	100
General election
Republican	Joseph Bellino Jr.	73,403	65.0
Democratic	Katybeth Davis	39,503	35.0
Total votes		112,906	100
Republican hold			

=== 2018 ===
2018 Michigan Senate election, District 16
Primary election
Party	Candidate	Votes	%
Republican	Mike Shirkey (incumbent)	18,105	63.5
Republican	Matt Dame	10,389	36.5
Total votes		28,494	100
General election
Republican	Mike Shirkey (incumbent)	56,980	62.7
Democratic	Val Cochran Toops	31,129	34.3
Libertarian	Ronald Muszynski	2,760	3.0
Total votes		90,869	100
Republican hold			

=== 2014 ===
2014 Michigan Senate election, District 16
Party	Candidate	Votes	%
Republican	Mike Shirkey	41,667	60.8
Democratic	Kevin Commet	26,823	39.2
Total votes		68,490	100
Republican hold			

=== Federal and statewide results ===
Year	Office	Results
2020	President	Trump 62.9 – 35.3%
2018	Senate	James 58.7 – 38.9%
2018	Governor	Schuette 56.5 – 40.0%
2016	President	Trump 61.3 – 33.3%
2014	Senate	Land 50.5 – 45.0%
2014	Governor	Snyder 57.9 – 39.6%
2012	President	Romney 55.0 – 43.9%
2012	Senate	Stabenow 49.9 – 46.6%

== Historical district boundaries ==
Map	Description	Apportionment Plan	Notes
	Oakland County (part); Avon Township; Birmingham; Bloomfield Hills; Bloomfield Township; Clawson; Pontiac Township; Royal Oak; Southfield Township; Troy	1964 Apportionment Plan	
	Oakland County (part); Berkley; Clawson; Ferndale; Hazel Park; Madison Heights; Pleasant Ridge; Royal Oak; Royal Oak Township (part); Troy (part)	1972 Apportionment Plan	
	Oakland County (part); Berkley; Birmingham; Clawson; Hazel Park; Madison Heights; Pleasant Ridge; Royal Oak; Troy	1982 Apportionment Plan	
	Oakland County (part); Addison Township; Auburn Hills; Independence Township; Keego Harbor; Lake Angelus; Oakland Township; Orchard Lake Village; Orion Township; Rochester; Hills; Springfield Township; Sylvan Lake; Waterford Township; White Lake Township; West Bloomfield Township (part)	1992 Apportionment Plan	
	Branch County; Hillsdale County; Lenawee County; St. Joseph County	2001 Apportionment Plan	
	Branch County; Hillsdale County; Jackson County	2011 Apportionment Plan	
