= Michigan's 65th House of Representatives district =

American legislative district

Michigan's 65th State House of Representatives district
Representative
Jaime Greene; R–Richmond
- Demographics: 87.7% White; 2.8% Black; 5.1% Hispanic; 0.4% Asian; 0.1% Native American; 0.4% Other; 3.5% Multiracial
- Population (2024): 93,632

Michigan's 65th House of Representatives district (also referred to as Michigan's 65th House district) is a legislative district within the Michigan House of Representatives located in parts of Lapeer, Macomb, and St. Clair counties. The district was created in 1965, when the Michigan House of Representatives district naming scheme changed from a county-based system to a numerical one.

== List of representatives ==
Representative	Party	Dates	Residence	Notes
William P. Hampton	Republican	1965–1970	Bloomfield Hills	Lived in Birmingham until around 1967.
James E. DeFebaugh	Republican	1971–1982	Bloomfield Township	Lived in Birmingham until around 1973.
Ruth McNamee	Republican	1983–1984	Birmingham	
Judith Miller	Republican	1985–1990	Birmingham	
Mike Bouchard	Republican	1991	Birmingham	Resigned.
John Jamian	Republican	1991–1992	Bloomfield Hills	
Philip E. Hoffman	Republican	1993	Horton	Resigned.
Clyde LeTarte	Republican	1993–1998	Horton	
Mickey Mortimer	Republican	1999–2002	Horton	
Jerry Kratz	Republican	2003	Grass Lake	Died in office.
Mickey Mortimer	Republican	2003–2004	Horton	
Leslie Mortimer	Republican	2005–2006	Horton	
Mike Simpson	Democratic	2007–2009	Liberty Township	Died in office.
Mike Shirkey	Republican	2010–2014	Liberty Township	
Brett Roberts	Republican	2015–2018	Eaton Township	Lived in Charlotte until around 2017.
Sarah Lightner	Republican	2019–2022	Springport	
Jaime Greene	Republican	2023–present	Richmond	

== Recent elections ==
=== 2020s ===
2026 Michigan House of Representatives election
Party	Candidate	Votes	%
Republican	Jaime Greene (incumbent)	32,520	70.83
Democratic	James M. O'Brien	13,391	29.17
Total votes		45,911	100
Republican hold			

2024 Michigan House of Representatives election
Party	Candidate	Votes	%
Republican	Jaime Greene	40,952	74.3
Democratic	Shirley Tomczak	14,190	25.7
Total votes		55,142	100
Republican hold			

2022 Michigan House of Representatives election
Party	Candidate	Votes	%
Republican	Jaime Greene	31,435	71.8
Democratic	Mark Lingeman	12,317	28.2
Total votes		43,752	100
Republican hold			

2020 Michigan House of Representatives election
Party	Candidate	Votes	%
Republican	Sarah Lightner	31,444	64.8
Democratic	Nancy Smith	17,116	35.2
Total votes		48,560	100
Republican hold			

2018 Michigan House of Representatives election
Party	Candidate	Votes	%
Republican	Sarah Lightner	21,774	59.3
Democratic	Terri McKinnon	13,942	38.0
Libertarian	Jason B. Rees	1,026	2.8
Total votes		36,742	100
Republican hold			

2016 Michigan House of Representatives election
Party	Candidate	Votes	%
Republican	Brett Roberts	25,098	60.5
Democratic	Bonnie Johnson	14,321	34.5
Libertarian	Ronald A. Muszynski	2,055	5.0
Total votes		41,474	100
Republican hold			

2014 Michigan House of Representatives election
Party	Candidate	Votes	%
Republican	Brett Roberts	15,955	57.0
Democratic	Bonnie Johnson	11,077	39.6
Libertarian	Ronald Muszynski	971	3.5
Total votes		28,003	100
Republican hold			

2012 Michigan House of Representatives election
Party	Candidate	Votes	%
Republican	Mike Shirkey	22,862	56.8
Democratic	Bonnie Johnson	17,381	43.2
Total votes		40,243	100
Republican hold			

2010 Michigan House of Representatives election
Party	Candidate	Votes	%
Republican	Mike Shirkey	17,889	63.2
Democratic	Janet Rochefort	10,405	36.8
Total votes		28,294	100
Republican gain from Democratic			

2008 Michigan House of Representatives election
Party	Candidate	Votes	%
Democratic	Mike Simpson	25,444	63.3
Republican	Ray Snell	14,759	36.7
Total votes		40,203	100
Democratic hold			

== Historical district boundaries ==
Map	Description	Apportionment Plan	Notes
	Oakland County (part): Birmingham; Bloomfield Hills; Bloomfield Township; Royal Oak (part); Southfield Township	1964 Apportionment Plan	
	Oakland County (part): Bloomfield Hills; Bloomfield Township (part); Southfield (part); Southfield Township; Sylvan Lake; West Bloomfield Township (part)	1972 Apportionment Plan	
	Oakland County (part): Birmingham; Bloomfield Township; Bloomfield Hills; Pontiac Township	1982 Apportionment Plan	
	Eaton County (part): Eaton Rapids; Hamlin Township; Jackson County (part): Columbia Township; Concord Township; Grass Lake Township; Hanover Township; Henrietta Township; Leoni Township; Liberty Township; Norvell Township; Parma Township; Pulaski Township; Rives Township; Sandstone Township; Spring Arbor Township; Springport Township; Tompkins Township; Waterloo Township	1992 Apportionment Plan	
	Eaton County (part): Brookfield Township; Eaton Rapids; Hamlin Township; Jackson County (part): Blackman Township; Columbia Township; Grass Lake Township; Henrietta Township; Leoni Township; Liberty Township; Norvell Township; Rives Township; Springport Township; Tompkins Township; Waterloo Township; Lenawee County (part): Cambridge Township	2001 Apportionment Plan	
	Eaton County (part): Brookfield Township; Eaton Township (part); Eaton Rapids; Hamlin Township; Jackson County (part): Blackman Township; Columbia Township; Grass Lake Township; Henrietta Township; Leoni Township; Liberty Township; Norvell Township; Rives Township; Springport Township; Tompkins Township; Waterloo Township; Lenawee County (part): Cambridge Township	2011 Apportionment Plan	
