= Jerry Kratz =

American academic and politician

Member of the Michigan House of Representatives from the 65th district
- In office January 1, 2003 – January 28, 2003
- Preceded by: Mickey Mortimer
- Succeeded by: Mickey Mortimer

Personal details
- Born: August 8, 1933 Detroit, Michigan
- Died: January 28, 2003 (aged 69) Grass Lake, Michigan
- Party: Republican
- Education: Wayne State University

Gerald B. Kratz (August 8, 1933 – January 28, 2003) was a Michigan academic and politician.

== Early life and education ==
Kratz was born on August 8, 1933, in Detroit, Michigan. In 1955, Kratz earned a bachelor's degree in education. The next year, Kratz earned a master's degree in education. In 1969, Kratz earned a doctorate degree in education and curriculum development. He earned all three of his degrees form Wayne State University.

== Career ==
Kratz served as superintendent of the Novi School District from 1972 to 1980. Kratz served as superintendent of the Jackson County Intermediate School District from 1980 to 2001. Kratz served as an adjunct professor at Eastern Michigan University from 1973 to 2003. Kratz, along with David Steel, owned the private firm Educational Associates. In March 2000, the Litchfield City Council hired Educational Associates conduct a search for a new city manager. On March 8, 2000, Steel and Kratz interviewed dozens Litchfield residents to find out what they were looking for in a new city manager. By March 13, 2000, the city council had received 37 applications for the city manager position. That same day, Steel and Kratz presented to the city council the brochure, which was to be sent to applicants. The brochure explained the position's duties and the qualities sought by the residents of Litchfield, based on their research. Kratz also worked as a real estate site agent.

On November 5, 2002, Kratz was elected to the Michigan House of Representatives seat representing the 65th district. In the state house, Kratz was a member of the House Apportions Committee and was head of the committee which handled the budget for the state's community colleges. Kratz introduced six bills during his political career. One of them sought to lower the legal level for drunk driving. He served as state representative from January 1, 2003, to his death on January 28, 2003.

== Personal life ==
During his time in legislature, Kratz resided in Grass Lake, Michigan. Kratz was married to Eleanor. Together, they had four children. Kratz was Catholic.

== Death ==
Kratz died of a heart attack on January 28, 2003, while working out on a treadmill in Grass Lake. In the special election to fill the vacancy in the 65th district left by his death, Republican Mickey Mortimer defeated Jerry Kratz's son, Democrat Kent Kratz.

== Electoral history ==
2002 Michigan House of Representatives 65th district Republican primary election
Party	Candidate	Votes	%
Republican	Jerry Kratz	3,462	100.0
Total votes		3,462	100.0

2002 Michigan House of Representatives 65th district general election
Party	Candidate	Votes	%
Republican	Jerry Kratz	13,934	55.97
Democratic	Sharon Renier	10,960	44.03
Total votes		24,894	100.0
