= Michigan Center School District =

School district in Michigan, United States

Address
- 400 South State Street Michigan Center, Jackson County, Michigan, 49254; United States

District information
- Motto: Every kid, every day.
- Grades: Pre-Kindergarten-12
- Superintendent: Brady Cook
- Schools: 3
- Budget: $20,621,000 2022-2023 expenditures
- NCES District ID: 2623790

Students and staff
- Students: 1,423 (2024-2025)
- Teachers: 78.47 (on an FTE basis) (2024-2025)
- Staff: 148.97 FTE (2024-2025)
- Student–teacher ratio: 18.13 (2024-2025)

Other information
- Website: www.mccardinals.org

Michigan Center School District is a public school district in Jackson County, Michigan. It serves Michigan Center and parts of Leoni Township.

== History ==
The first school in Michigan Center was established in 1833. The first recorded location of a school was in 1847, when a frame school was built on Broad Street on the site of the current Keicher Elementary. It was replaced in 1869 with a brick building.

The oldest section of the building on the Keicher Elementary site (named after R. F. Keicher, a former school superintendent) was built in 1918 to house all grades in the district. It was not until 1928 that the district graduated its first class of seniors. A large addition was built in 1930, and an elementary section was built in 1952. Arnold Elementary was built in 1950. Clement School and its district were annexed to Michigan Center in 1962.

The current high school opened on October 24, 1958, and it was dedicated on April 26, 1959. The former high school became a junior high school before ultimately becoming Kaiser Elementary.

== Schools ==
Schools in Michigan Center School District
School	Address	Notes
Michigan Center Jr/Sr High School	400 South State Street, Michigan Center	Grades 7–12. Built 1958.
Keicher Elementary	137 Broad Street, Michigan Center	Grades 3–6
Arnold Elementary	4064 Page Avenue, Michigan Center	Grades PreK-2
