= Jaime Greene =

American politician from Michigan

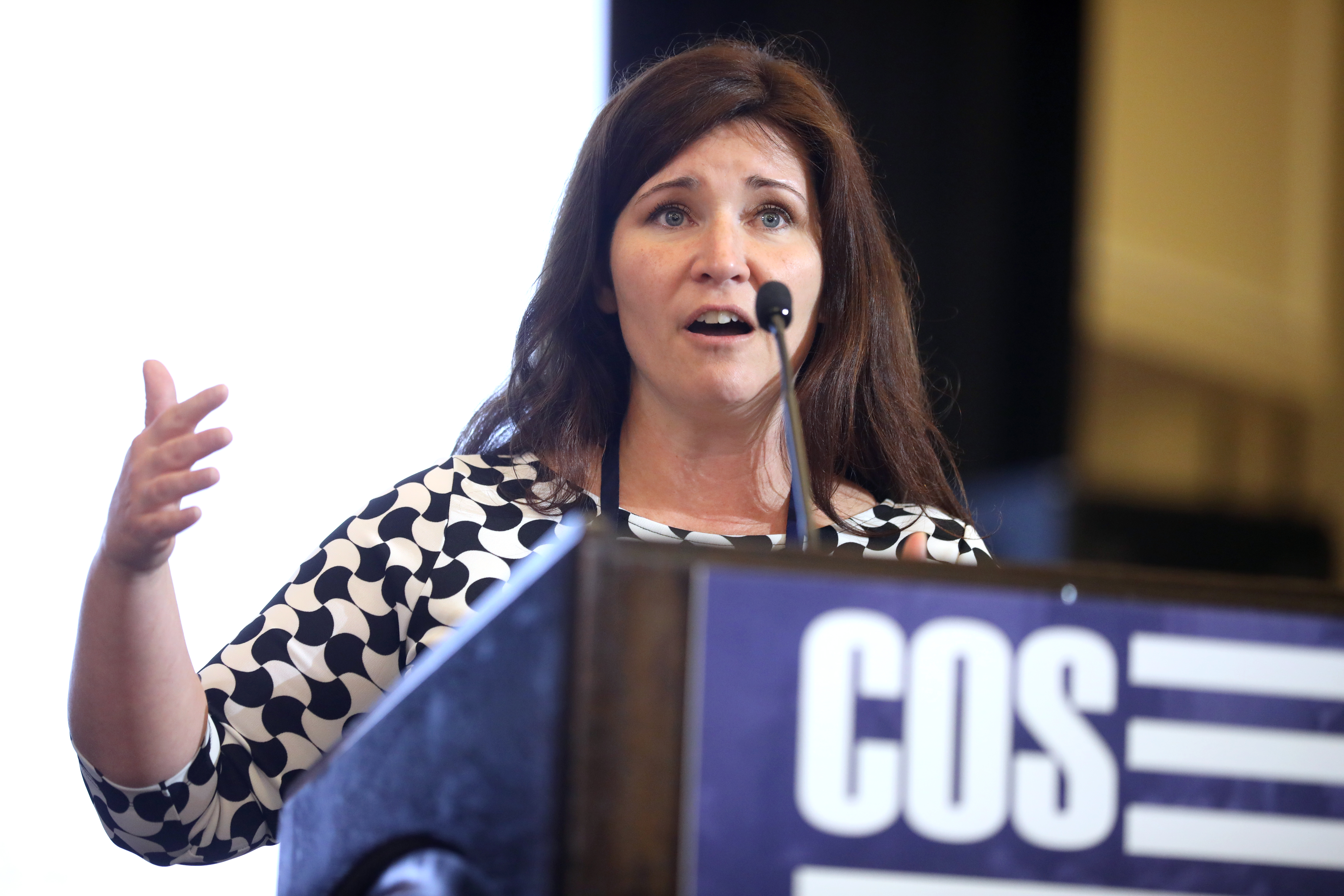

Member of the Michigan House of Representatives from the 65th district
- Incumbent
- Assumed office January 1, 2023
- Preceded by: Sarah Lightner (redistricting)

Personal details
- Party: Republican
- Education: Henry Ford II High School; Oakland University; Liberty University

Military service
- Branch: United States Navy
- Service years: 1996–1999

Jaime Greene is an American politician serving as a member of the Michigan House of Representatives since 2023, representing the 65th district. She is a member of the Republican Party. She served in the United States Navy from 1996 to 1999.

== Political career ==
Greene was first elected in the 2022 election. She was reelected in 2024.

During the 2023 to 2024 legislative term, Greene served as minority vice chair of the House Education Committee. She also served on the House Energy, Communications, and Technology Committee and the House Government Operations Committee. During the 2025 to 2026 legislative term, Greene served as chair of the House Communications and Technology Committee. Her official House biography also lists her as vice chair of the House Oversight Committee.

In 2024, Greene sponsored House Bill 5922 with Representatives Denise Mentzer and Alicia St. Germaine. The bill amended the distribution of certain transportation funds and became Public Act 203 of 2024. In 2025, Greene sponsored House Bill 4401, which amended the Natural Resources and Environmental Protection Act to remove the sunset on Michigan's pheasant hunting license requirement. The bill became Public Act 47 of 2025.

In September 2025, Greene attended the 50 States One Israel conference, meeting with leaders across Israel. Leading up to a potential government shutdown, speaker Matt Hall instructed the Republican caucus not to leave the state while the budget was not completed and removed all bills from her committee as a result of attending the event.

In 2026, Greene introduced House Bill 5899, which would create an Artificial Intelligence Governing Board within the Michigan Department of Technology, Management and Budget. The bill would also establish a pilot program to evaluate the use of generative artificial intelligence by state departments and agencies.

Before her election to the Michigan House of Representatives, Greene served on the Richmond City Council and on local boards, including the City of Richmond Economic Development Corporation Board and the City of Richmond Parks and Recreation Board. Her prior work also includes service as a technical director at Faith Lutheran Church, a veterans counselor, and a regional support representative for Classical Conversations.
