= Thomas M. Holcomb =

American politician (1945–2024)

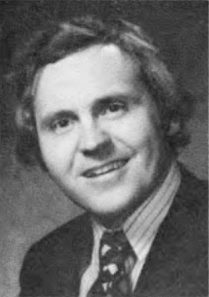

Member of the Michigan House of Representatives from the 58th district
- In office January 1975 – January 1979
- Preceded by: Frederick L. Stackable
- Succeeded by: Debbie Stabenow

Personal details
- Born: September 14, 1945 Charlotte, Michigan, U.S.
- Died: May 8, 2024 (aged 78)
- Party: Democratic
- Spouse: Suzanne M. Holcomb
- Children: 3
- Education: University of Miami
- Profession: government, education

Thomas Martin "Hoke" Holcomb (September 14, 1945 – May 8, 2024) was an American politician and teacher who served as a member of the Michigan House of Representatives.

== Early life ==
Holcomb was born on September 14, 1945, in Charlotte, Michigan. He graduated from Sexton High School in Lansing, Michigan, and was involved in school politics and the baseball and tennis teams. As a young teenager, he worked as a retail associate for his father's clothing store (Davis Clothing) in downtown Lansing. Many state legislators frequented the store to purchase suits and accessories, and it was there that Holcomb, through his interactions assisting elected officials, was introduced to public policy and government. He attended the University of Miami and earned his undergraduate degree in political science and minored in history.

== Career ==
In 1972, Holcomb ran for office and was defeated as the Democratic candidate for the 58th district in the Michigan House of Representatives. Two years later, he re-engineered his campaign strategies and covered 35 miles on foot walking the county and interacting with voters. His most effective campaign marketing slogan, "Have a Coke on Hoke", went viral at county fairs, as he handed out Coca-Cola to potential voters. On November 5, 1974, at 29 years old, Holcomb was elected to the Michigan House of Representatives where he represented the 58th district from January 8, 1975 to January 1979.

Holcomb had grassroots involvement and was praised for his contributions to state and local education, agricultural development and local unions. However, he was not re-elected in 1978, losing the Democratic nomination to future U.S. Senator Debbie Stabenow. In 1980, he was a delegate to the Democratic National Convention from Michigan. In 1982 he was defeated as the Democratic candidate for the 20th district in the Michigan Senate.

On April 1, 1978, he married Suzanne M. Spence; 250 people attended the wedding, which was locally televised. Holcomb and his family to moved Mason, Michigan, 15 miles south of Lansing. There, he ran for the city council and was close to the Ingham County Fair board and former city Administrator Patrick Price, as well as managing the campaign initiatives of former Registrar of Deeds, Paula Johnson.

He continued his career as a school teacher at Mason High School and helped at-risk students in a newly created position within the school district. In 2000, he ran again for the 58th district in the Michigan House of Representatives, but was defeated.

He died on May 8, 2024, at the age of 78.
