= Cameron S. Brown =

American politician (born 1954)

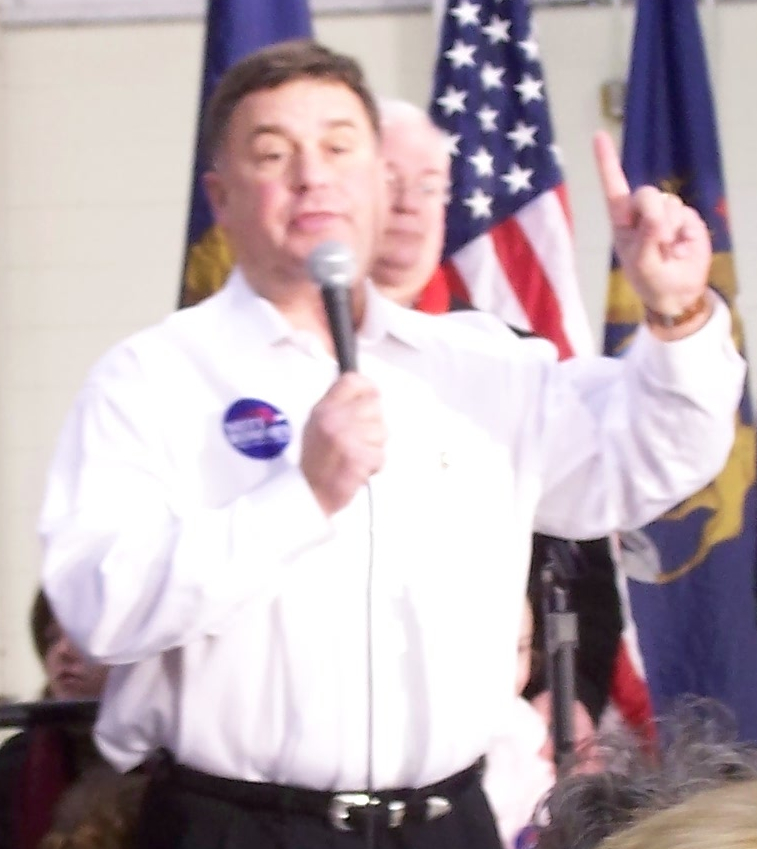
- Cameron S. Brown at a rally for Mitt Romney in 2008

Member of the Michigan Senate from the 16th district
- In office January 1, 2003 – December 31, 2010
- Preceded by: Mat Dunaskiss
- Succeeded by: Bruce Caswell

Member of the Michigan House of Representatives from the 59th district
- In office January 1, 1999 – December 31, 2002
- Preceded by: Glenn Oxender
- Succeeded by: Rick Shaffer

Personal details
- Born: July 6, 1954 (age 72) Washington, D.C., U.S.
- Party: Republican
- Spouse: Robin Brown 1983-1991 Helen Brown
- Education: University of Missouri-Kansas City
- Profession: Independent Consultant and Speaker

Cameron S. Brown (born July 6, 1954) is an independent consultant and speaker, and a former Republican Party legislator from the U.S. state of Michigan having served two terms in the Michigan Senate.

Brown was born in Washington, D.C. He attended the College of William and Mary and earned a bachelor's degree in history from the University of Missouri–Kansas City. He earned a master of public administration degree from Western Michigan University. He is the sixth generation of his family to live in southwest Michigan where he and his wife reside in the farmhouse built by his great-great grandparents.

Before holding elective office, Brown was vice president of marketing for Freeman Manufacturing Company, an orthopedic soft goods manufacturer headquartered in Sturgis, Michigan. He was with the company 18 years.

Brown served five terms as a member of the St. Joseph County Board of Commissioners and was elected board chairman three times. From 1981 to 1986, he was a member of the City of Sturgis City Commission. In 1998, he was elected to the Michigan House of Representatives from the 59th district and re-elected to a second term in 2000. Brown was elected to the Michigan Senate from the 16th district in 2002 and 2006. The state's term limits prohibited him from seeking re-election in 2010.

In 2010, Brown sought the Republican nomination for secretary of state, losing narrowly to Ruth Johnson.
