= William DeBilzan =

American artist

- Born: February 27, 1956 (age 70); Amarillo, Texas, United States
- Occupation: Visual artist

William DeBilzan (born February 27, 1956, in Amarillo, Texas) is an American artist who focuses on abstract expressionist paintings and sculptures.

== Early life ==
Born in Amarillo, Texas in 1956, he was raised in the small farm town of Grass Lake, Michigan. As a result of his Midwest background, he often incorporates rural landscape elements within his paintings and rustic frames.

== Career ==
DeBilzan traveled west to Southern California in his early twenties and launched a construction company that focused on tile design, which he owned and operated for 18 years. During a difficult time in his mid-30s, he started to visit art galleries and soon began to experiment with painting. Soon, he found that people became more interested in his paintings rather than his houses. DeBilzan began selling his work at local art fairs, and subsequently opened a gallery in Laguna Beach, California.

DeBilzan went on to open galleries in Santa Fe, New Mexico, and Delray Beach, Florida. His work has also been exhibited in dozens of galleries in various countries.

His artistic works include an extensive mural and sculpture installation at the Marriott Central Park Hotel in New York City and a painting installation at the Burj Khalifa in Dubai, UAE. His artwork themes include loneliness, friendship, and love.

His works have also been displayed at the University of New Mexico in Santa Fe, New Mexico and in the Ella Sharp Museum in Jackson, Michigan.

DeBilzan has galleries in Laguna Beach, California and Delray Beach, Florida.

== Style ==
DeBilzan's artistic style is characterized by elongated figures, engaging textures, and rich color palette.

== Personal life ==
He currently resides with his family in Delray Beach, Florida, and continues to work from his studio in Delray Beach Florida.
