= Eric Leutheuser =

American politician

Member of the Michigan House of Representatives from the 58th district
- In office January 1, 2015 – January 1, 2021
- Preceded by: Kenneth Kurtz
- Succeeded by: Andrew Fink

Personal details
- Born: 5 October 8, 1959 (age 66) Hillsdale, Michigan
- Party: Republican
- Spouse: Laura
- Education: Hillsdale College

Eric Leutheuser (born October 8, 1959) was a Republican member of the Michigan House of Representatives from 2015 to 2021

Prior to his election to the House, Leutheuser was president of an auto dealership and on the boards of the Hillsdale County Community Foundation and the Hillsdale Economic Development Commission. He is a member of the Hillsdale County Rotary Club and Right to Life.
