= Frederick L. Stackable =

American politician (1935–2022)

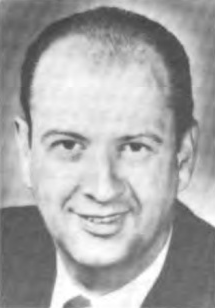

Member of the Michigan House of Representatives from the 58th district
- In office January 1, 1971 – 1974
- Preceded by: Philip O. Pittenger
- Succeeded by: Thomas M. Holcomb

Personal details
- Born: December 4, 1935
- Died: July 31, 2022 (aged 86)
- Party: Republican
- Education: Michigan State University; Wayne State University

Frederick L. Stackable (December 4, 1935 – July 31, 2022) was a former member of the Michigan House of Representatives.

== Early life ==
Stackable was born on December 4, 1935.

== Education ==
Stackable earned a Bachelors of Science degree from Michigan State University and a Juris Doctor degree from Wayne State University.

== Career ==
Stackable was a lawyer. On November 3, 1970, Stackable was elected to the Michigan House of Representatives where he represented the 58th district from January 1, 1971 to 1974.

== Personal life ==
Stackable married Joyce Howard Frank on July 30, 1999.

Stackable died on July 31, 2022.
