= Kenneth Kurtz =

American politician

The Honorable the Reverend Kenneth Kurtz

Member of the Michigan House of Representatives from the 58th district
- In office January 1, 2009 – December 31, 2014
- Preceded by: Bruce Caswell
- Succeeded by: Eric Leutheuser

Personal details
- Born: February 15, 1947 (age 79) Kalamazoo, Michigan
- Party: Republican
- Spouse: Diane
- Website: State Rep. Kenneth Kurtz

Kenneth Kurtz (born February 15, 1947) is a Republican politician from Michigan who was a member of the Michigan House of Representatives from 2009 until 2014.

Kurtz owned and operated three funeral homes in the Coldwater area, and was pastor of United Brethren Church in that town. He has served on several community boards and is a member of several local organizations.
