= Coe House (Grass Lake, Michigan) =

- Henry and Aurora (Walker) Vinkle House
- U.S. National Register of Historic Places
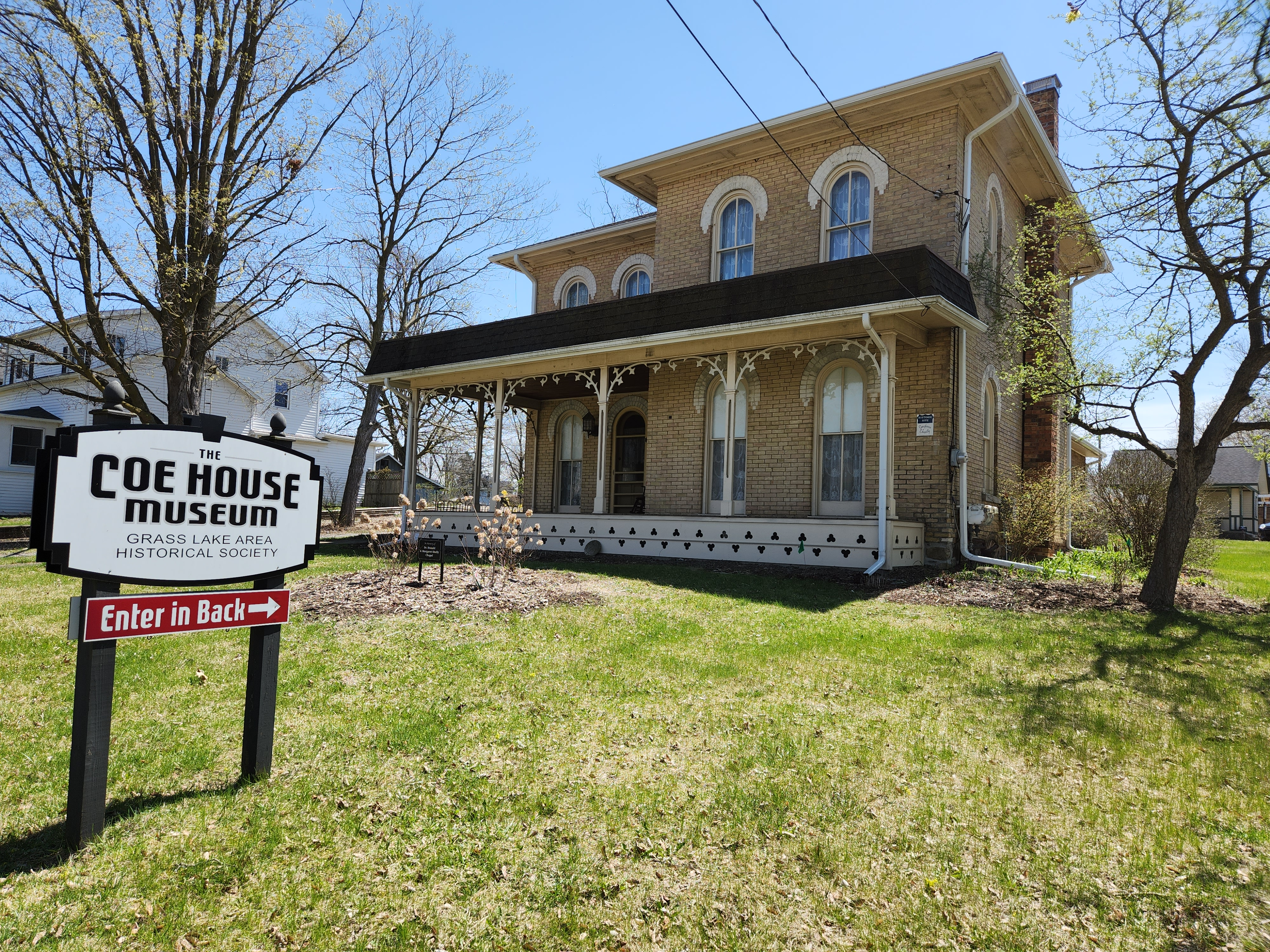

- Location within Michigan
- Interactive map
- Location: 371 W. Michigan Ave., Grass Lake, Michigan
- Coordinates: 42°14′56″N 84°13′07″W
- Built: 1871
- Architectural style: Italianate
- NRHP reference No.: 100001391
- Added to NRHP: July 31, 2017

The Coe House, also known as the Henry and Aurora (Walker) Vinkle House, is a museum and former single family home located at 371 West Michigan Avenue in Grass Lake, Michigan. It was listed on the National Register of Historic Places in 2017.

== History ==
When the land around Grass Lake was opened up to European settlers in the 1830s, the plot where this building now stands was bought and sold multiple times. Finally, in 1837, the parcel was sold to Daniel Walker, one of the area's first European inhabitants and the founder of Grass Lake village. Walker owned the land until his death in 1839, at which time it passed to his widow Maria. When Maria died in 1846, a parcel was split off for her son, William H. Walker, who was a local brick manufacturer and eventually established a drug business. In 1869, Walker's daughter Aurora married cabinet-maker and undertaker Henry Vinkle Jr., and in 1871 the Walkers gave Aurora and Henry a small plot of land next door to their house.

Likely between about 1871 and 1875, the Vinkles constructed a house on the plot of land. They lived and raised two children in the house. Henry Vinkle's business flourished, and he branched out into other investments and served some time in public office. In the late 1890s. however, the family moved to the Dakota Territory for health reasons, eventually settling in Dickey County, North Dakota. In 1901, the Vinkles sold the house was sold to the Detroit, Ypsilanti, Ann Arbor and Jackson Railway, who used it as a boarding house for their workers. In 1909, the railway sold the house to the elderly Herman H. and Fredericka Mellencamp. Herman died in 1919 and Fredericka in 1920, leaving the house to their son Henry. In 1925, Henry Mellencamp rented it to the young widow, Cathrene Walz, who purchased the home the next year. Walz remained in the house many years, renting rooms and raising her family, She eventually sold it to Archie and Myrta Coe.

The Coes lived in the house until Archie's death in 1969 and Myrta left to live with her children in 1974. Myrta Coe arranged to have the Grass Lake Area Historical Society purchase the home, to turn into a museum. The Coe House Museum opened to the public in 1977.

== Description ==
The Coe House is a two-story vernacular Italianate brick house. The walls are solid brick, with exterior walls three bricks deep.
