= Brett Roberts (politician) =

American farmer, businessperson, and politician

Member of the Michigan House of Representatives from the 65th district
- In office January 1, 2015 – December 31, 2018
- Preceded by: Mike Shirkey
- Succeeded by: Sarah Lightner

Personal details
- Party: Republican
- Spouse: Megan
- Children: 1 daughter and 1 son
- Occupation: Farmer and politician
- Website: gophouse.org/representatives/central/roberts/

Brett Roberts is a former Republican Member of the Michigan House of Representatives, elected in 2014 who represented the 65th District.

== Early life ==
Roberts was raised in Eaton County, Michigan and graduated from Charlotte High School.

== Professional career ==
Roberts is a sixth-generation farmer and owner of a Dairy Queen in Charlotte, Michigan.

== Political career ==
Roberts was elected to represent Michigan's 65th District in the Michigan House of Representatives in 2014, defeating Bonnie J. Johnson and Ronald Muszynski, following the departure of Mike Shirkey who went to serve in the Michigan Senate.

=== Electoral history ===
2014 General Election – Michigan's 65th State House of Representatives District
Party	Candidate	Votes	%	±%
Republican	Brett Roberts	15,955	56.98	+0.17
Democratic	Bonnie J. Johnson	11,077	39.56	−3.63
Libertarian	Ronald Muszynski	971	3.47	+3.47

2014 Republican Party Primary Election – Michigan's 65th State House of Representatives District
Party	Candidate	Votes	%
Republican	Brett Roberts	1,691	26
Republican	John Calhoun	1,614	25
Republican	Robert Sutherby	1,392	22
Republican	James Stormont	1,080	17
Republican	Dale Moretz	527	8
Republican	Dan Fulara	115	2
