= Mike Simpson (Michigan politician) =

American politician

Member of the Michigan House of Representatives from the 65th district
- In office January 1, 2007 – December 18, 2009
- Preceded by: Leslie Mortimer
- Succeeded by: Mike Shirkey

Personal details
- Born: December 11, 1962 Ypsilanti, Michigan, U.S.
- Died: December 18, 2009 (aged 47) Cleveland, Ohio, U.S.
- Party: Democratic
- Profession: politician
- Website: Official House Website Blog Website Myspace

Mike Simpson (December 11, 1962 – December 18, 2009) was an American businessman and politician who served as the Michigan State Representative for the 65th district from 2007 until his death in 2009. He was a member of the Democratic Party.

== Education ==
Mike Simpson received his high school diploma at Plymouth-Canton High School. After high school the Representative attended college for some time.

== Professional experience ==
Mike Simpson was a veteran who served in the United States Army Reserve from 1980–1986. After high school Simpson joined his family's business and was an entrepreneur and business owner until his death.

== Political experience ==
In 2006 Mike was elected state representative in Michigan's 65th house district after having run in the same district in 2004 and in US House District 7 in 2002.

== Organizations ==
He was a member of all five local business chambers in the 65th District; Jackson Area Chamber of Commerce, Eaton Rapids Area Chamber of Commerce, Brooklyn-Irish Hills Chamber of Commerce, Grass Lake Regional Chamber of Commerce and the Onsted Area Chamber of Commerce.

He was a member of the Brooklyn Area Kiwanis Club, the Michigan Farm Bureau, the American Legion Post 252, the National Rifle Association and the Michigan Fraternal Order of Police Lodge 70.

== House committees ==
At the time of his death Simpson served as a member of the House Tourism & Natural Resources Committee, the House Commerce Committee, and the House Insurance Committee. Additionally, Mike was the Majority Vice-Chairman of the House Health Policy Committee, a standing member of the National Conference of State Legislators, National Health Policy Committee, and a member of the Board of Directors for the Michigan Center for Rural Health.

== Death ==
Simpson had been ill with a rare blood disorder known as light-chain deposition. He died of a heart attack while returning from the Cleveland Clinic, according to House Speaker Andy Dillon, on December 18, 2009.
