= Mike Shirkey =

American politician (born 1954)

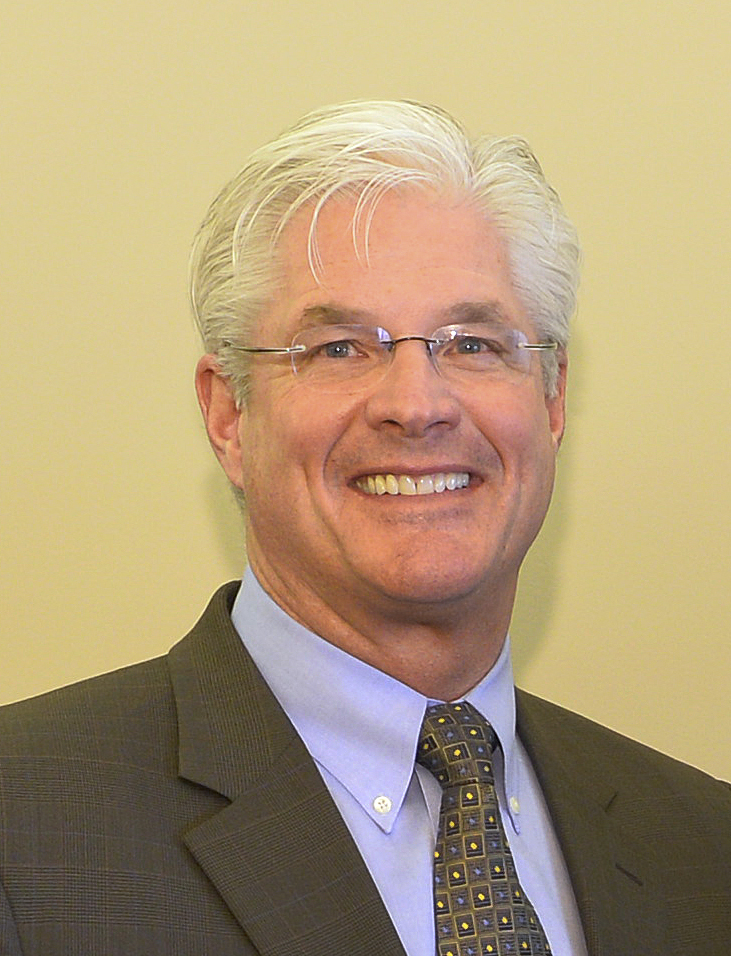

Majority Leader of the Michigan Senate
- In office January 1, 2019 – January 1, 2023
- Preceded by: Arlan Meekhof
- Succeeded by: Winnie Brinks

Member of the Michigan Senate from the 16th district
- In office January 1, 2015 – January 1, 2023
- Preceded by: Bruce Caswell
- Succeeded by: Joe Bellino

Member of the Michigan House of Representatives from the 65th district
- In office November 30, 2010 – December 31, 2014
- Preceded by: Mike Simpson
- Succeeded by: Brett Roberts

Personal details
- Born: December 5, 1954 (age 71) Jackson, Michigan, U.S.
- Party: Republican
- Education: Kettering University (BA); University of Wisconsin, Madison (MA)
- Website: Official website

Michael J. Shirkey (born December 5, 1954) is an American politician who served as a Republican member of the Michigan State Senate and as a member of the Michigan House of Representatives. He was first elected to the House in 2010 and to the Senate in 2014. His district, the 16th, covered all of Branch, Hillsdale, and Jackson Counties. From 2019 to 2023, Shirkey was the majority leader of the Michigan State Senate.

== Early life and education ==
He has a bachelor's degree from Kettering University and a master's degree from the University of Wisconsin–Madison. Shirkey worked for General Motors for 13 years before starting his own engineering company. Shirkey founded the Jackson-based assembly machine manufacturing company, Orbitform.

== Tenure ==
In May 2020, Shirkey appeared onstage at an American Patriot Council rally in Grand Rapids, Michigan with William Null and Adam Fox. In October 2020, William Null, his twin brother, Michael Null, Adam Fox, and 10 other men were charged in a plot to kidnap and kill Michigan Governor Gretchen Whitmer.

In early April 2020, Shirkey criticized Governor Gretchen Whitmer for extending a "stay home" order until the end of April. Shirkey opposed face mask requirements in Michigan.

In November 2020, Shirkey stated that he would not attempt to appoint a slate of electors in the Electoral College that would vote for President Donald Trump, following Trump's loss in the 2020 United States presidential election. Trump invited Shirkey and several of his Republican colleagues to the White House following Shirkey's statement. Shirkey and several of his colleagues in the Michigan Legislature met with Trump on November 20, 2020. Shirkey and others issued a statement following the meeting in which they stated that they would "follow the normal process" of certifying the state's election results.

On December 23, 2020, Shirkey tested positive for COVID-19. He believed he was exposed to the coronavirus on December 19. On December 21, Shirkey attended Lee Chatfield's farewell speech at the Michigan State Capitol. Shirkey characterized his COVID-19 illness as him having fought against the "Chinese flu army"; his remarks were criticized as xenophobic.

In April 2020, Shirkey's business, Orbitform, received $1.8 million in Paycheck Protection Program (PPP) loans. In January 2021, Orbitform received another $1.7 million in PPP loans, for a total of $3.5 million. During this time, Shirkey led the Michigan Senate to block allocation of $4 billion in federal COVID reliefs funds for food and rental assistance. Although Shirkey claims to not be involved in the day-to-day management of his company, several of his family members (including son David Shirkey, grandson Karter Fannin, and Mark Shirkey) are employed at Orbitform in management positions.

In February 2021, Shirkey falsely claimed that the January 6 United States Capitol attack was a "hoax", that it was "staged", and that supporters of Donald Trump did not carry it out.

In a February interview with radio station WKHM, Shirkey falsely claimed that dead people voted in Michigan in the 2020 elections. In 2021, Shirkey led efforts in the Michigan Senate by Republicans which according to the GOP are aimed at securing elections in Michigan, Democrats and other critics have called these efforts by Republicans a push to restrict voting rights.

In April 2021, Shirkey accepted an invitation to meet with militia leaders. During the meeting in Grand Rapids, Shirkey told the militias, "We need you now more than ever to continue to train" and "to stand up and test that assertion of authority by government". The Associated Press described the event, stating, "Michigan's GOP leadership has for the first time in memory bestowed legitimacy on its state's militia, long relegated to the shadows" and indicative of the rightward shift of the Michigan GOP after the 2020 elections.

Shirkey was ineligible for re-election in 2022 due to term limits.

In his farewell address to the Senate, Shirkey claimed that "the surprise attack of an insidious virus" was "one that we were not prepared for, but one that was most certainly planned," embracing the unproven theory that COVID was a designed attack by China. He also suggested a series of "little-g gods" like climate change, gun control, digital currency, child sacrifice, and "trans-whatever" are part of a broader push to "achieve a one-world government" and "one-world religion." He also took aim at the World Economic Forum, arguing the non-governmental lobbying organization is behind a push for "the elimination of sovereignty", and that "It's becoming glaringly apparent COVID was just the beginning of the forces that will test the very fabric of our freedoms, independence, our sovereignty, our values, and even our God-given rights." According to the Anti-Defamation League, adherents of the "Great Reset" conspiracy theory "warn that 'global elites' will use the pandemic to advance their interests and push forward a globalist plot to destroy American sovereignty and prosperity." He also shared an anecdote about noticing warmth in a Senate bathroom and reaching his hand into a Senate toilet to test the water temperature. He said, "I put my hand in it, and it was hot water. So I went back to the office and said, 'Please, get a hold of maintenance staff around here and ask them why taxpayers are paying for hot water in our toilets."

== See also ==
- List of Michigan state legislatures

Michigan Senate
Preceded by Arlan Meekhof	Majority Leader of the Michigan Senate; 2019–2023	Succeeded by Winnie Brinks
