= Eva McCall Hamilton =

American politician

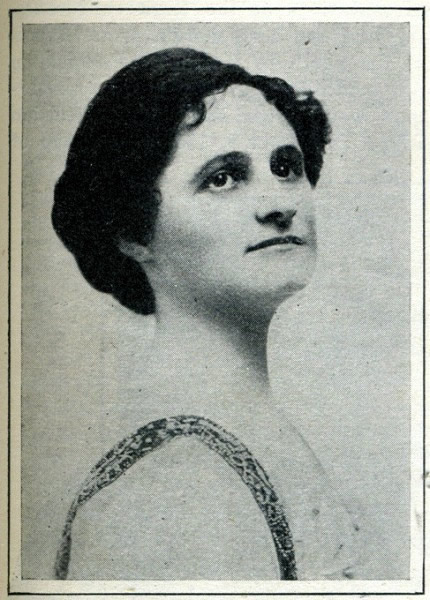
- Eva McCall Hamilton in 1920

Member of the Michigan Senate from the 16th district
- In office 1921–1922
- Preceded by: Roy M. Watkins
- Succeeded by: Charles R. Sligh

Personal details
- Born: December 13, 1871 Memphis, Michigan
- Died: January 28, 1948 (aged 76) Grand Rapids, Michigan
- Party: Republican
- Spouse: Charles B. Hamilton
- Profession: Politician and teacher

Eva McCall Hamilton (December 13, 1871 – January 28, 1948) was an American politician from the state of Michigan. A Republican, she was Michigan's first woman to be elected to the Michigan Legislature and served as a State Senator from 1921 to 1922. Hamilton was a teacher from Grand Rapids.

== Early life ==
Born on December 13, 1871, in Memphis, Michigan to Scottish and English parents who saw that she was well educated for her era, and that she graduated as a teacher from a normal school.

== Political activism ==
During her life, Hamilton was involved with public issues and serve on various local, state, and national committees focusing on initiatives designed to encourage women to take a large role in civic affairs. One of these was the Michigan League of Women Voters, established in Grand Rapids in 1919 and today known as the League of Women Voters of Michigan.

=== Suffrage movement ===
Hamilton was a leader of Grand Rapid's women's suffrage movement. Hamilton was a delegate to several state and national suffrage organizations and traveled around Michigan to establish other "equal suffrage" organizations. Her marriage to Charles B. Hamilton, an advertising executive and founder of the Grand Rapids Furniture Association, helped her gain access to Grand Rapid's community leaders. Due in part to Hamilton's efforts, the city became a hub of Michigan's suffrage movement.

In 1910, Hamilton – wearing a wide-brimmed hat – held the reins of a large horse-drawn "Lilly Float for Suffragists" entry by the Grand Rapids Equal Franchise Club, followed by 75 local suffragists in decorated cars, in Grand Rapid's annual homecoming parade. Suffrage parade entries were unusual at that time.

In 1912, she was one of three Grand Rapids women who mailed out six tons of "Votes for Women" literature, buttons, postcards, stickers, rubber stamps, paper napkins and lantern slides. Governor Chase Osborn commended Hamilton in a letter on March 30, 1912, for her efforts in the "woman's suffrage cause", when he wrote, "I think no one has done better work for the cause than you."

=== Farmers markets ===
Hamilton was also a leader in the campaign to establish city farmers markets like the one that still operates at East Fulton Street and Fuller Avenue in Grand Rapids. Though the markets were opposed by the dozens of neighborhood grocers in the city, Hamilton and other members of the "High Cost of Living Commission" argued the markets were a preferable option of getting fresh food to city residents. Despite the opposition, they were able to convince city commissioners to set up three farmers markets throughout the city. In 1917, civic ordinances prohibiting farmers from selling directly to customers were ended and helped combat the rising cost of city living.

== Political career ==
I'm not here to revolutionize the legislature. I only want to cooperate with my fellow members of the Senate and do what I can with the others to give Michigan the best legislature the state ever had.

— Eva McCall Hamilton

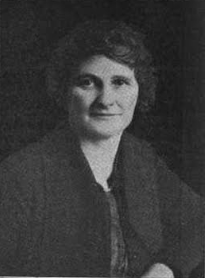
Eva McCall Hamilton, 1921

Hamilton was elected to the Michigan Senate's 16th District in 1920 by a 2-to-1 margin in the first election in which women were allowed to vote. Her arrival in the Senate attracted a high level of media attention and initially drew concerns from her male colleagues. Hamilton told reporters, "I'm not here to revolutionize the legislature. I only want to cooperate with my fellow members of the Senate and do what I can with the others to give Michigan the best legislature the state ever had."

She had an uncle that had served in the Michigan Legislature, Thomas W. McCall, which helped her to network, however, she called herself "Eva M. Hamilton" to avoid capitalizing on her uncle's name. During her term, she was involved in passage of laws dealing with women and children. She served on four committees – banks and corporations, taxation, normal schools, and insurance – and chaired a fifth, the industrial schools committee, which oversaw the state's training schools for juvenile offenders.

Hamilton's first speech in the Senate Chamber argued for the passage of a bill requiring applicants for marriage licenses to supply proof that they were free of sexually transmitted diseases – diseases that she felt condemned women to a form of involuntary suicide. The bill did not pass. One of her successful bills raised the mill tax in certain cities to fund pay raises for teachers. Another achievement was her work on Senator McArthur's 1921 bill to reform the Michigan Mothers' Pension Act. Laws such as this were revolutionary because they provided public funds for supporting underprivileged children in their homes rather than in institutions.

In 1922, she was defeated in a three-way Republican primary election by Charles R. Sligh, a furniture manufacturer who abandoned the seat in 1924, when he ran an unsuccessful campaign for governor. At the time of her departure, she was considered to have been respected by her colleagues, having received endorsements from several of them in her failed re-election bid. A press endorsement stated that her record was one "any man could be proud of in the state legislature."

== Death ==
Hamilton died of heart failure on January 28, 1948, in Grand Rapids. She was cremated, an unusual decision to make at the time.

== Legacy ==
When she died in 1948 at age 76, Hamilton was still the first and only woman to serve in the Michigan Senate. In 2018, Democratic Senator Winnie Brinks defeated state representative Chris Afendoulis to secure the seat as the second woman, after Hamilton, to represent Grand Rapids in the Michigan Senate.

She was inducted into the Michigan Women's Hall of Fame in 2012.

=== Portrait in Michigan State Capitol ===
A portrait of Hamilton is one of six large portraits displayed in the Senate Chamber of the Michigan State Capitol in Lansing, Michigan. The portraits is located on the northwest wall, along with a portrait of Governor Lewis Cass. The portrait was painted by Larry J. Blovits, also from Grand Rapids.
