= Steve Vear =

American politician

Member of the Michigan House of Representatives from the 58th district
- In office January 1, 1999 – 2002
- Preceded by: Michael Earl Nye
- Succeeded by: Bruce Caswell

Personal details
- Born: January 16, 1952 Indianapolis, Indiana
- Party: Republican
- Spouse: Mary
- Children: 3
- Education: Hillsdale College
- Profession: Accountant

Steve Vear (born January 16, 1952) is a former member of the Michigan House of Representatives.

== Early life ==
Vear was born on January 16, 1952, in Indianapolis, Indiana.

== Education ==
Vear graduated from Hillsdale College with a Bachelors of Science in accounting.

== Career ==
Vear has been a public accountant since 1980 and still runs an accounting business in Hillsdale, MI. On November 3, 1998, Vear was elected to the Michigan House of Representatives where he represented the 58th district from January 13, 1999, to 2002. During this time he served on several committees. For the 1999–2000 term, he served on the "Agriculture and Resource Management", "Health Policy", "Regulatory Reform" (Vice Chair), and "Tax Policy" committees. For the 2001–2002 term, he served on the "Tax Policy" (Vice Chair), "Commerce", "Agriculture and Resource Management", and "Senior Health, Security, and Retirement" committees. He was also a part of and the chair for the "Subcommittee on Tax Simplification" and the "Subcommittee on Auditor General Reports".

== Personal life ==
Vear is married to Mary. Together they had three children.
