= Bruce Caswell =

American politician (born 1949)

Member of the Michigan Senate from the 16th district
- In office 2011–2015
- Preceded by: Cameron S. Brown
- Succeeded by: Mike Shirkey

Member of the Michigan House of Representatives from the 58th district
- In office January 1, 2003 – December 31, 2008
- Preceded by: Steve Vear
- Succeeded by: Kenneth Kurtz

Personal details
- Born: October 20, 1949 (age 76)
- Party: Republican Party
- Spouse: Beth
- Children: Mark and Kevin
- Education: Michigan State University
- Occupation: Teacher, Superintendent

Bruce Caswell (born October 20, 1949) is a Republican politician from the U.S. state of Michigan, serving as a member of the Michigan Senate for the 16th district from 2011 until 2015. He also served in the Michigan State House of Representatives from 2003 to 2011, representing the 58th Michigan House district.

== Early life ==
Caswell is the son of Donald and Eleanor Caswell. He graduated from North Adams High School in 1967. After graduation Caswell attended the United States Military Academy at West Point for two years. He received a bachelor's degree in mathematics, American history, and physics education from Michigan State University in 1971, and returned to earn a master's degree in U.S. history in 1976.

== Career ==
Caswell is a retired school teacher and school superintendent. He taught history, mathematics, and physics over his thirty years of service as a teacher. His first teaching position was at () North Adams-Jerome Public Schools, the district where he went to school as a student. He later taught at () Onsted Community Schools.

In 1979, he began his teaching career at () Pittsford Area Schools. Caswell also served as the superintendent of Pittsford Area Schools from 1997 to 2000, retiring in 2000. Bruce served as the defensive coordinator for Pittsford's 1997 state championship football team. He led the boys track team to the first of four consecutive MHSAA state championships in 1994. Caswell was a 2000 Michigan High School Coaches Hall of Fame inductee in honor of his coaching achievements.

Caswell served as the supervisor for Adams Township in rural Hillsdale County for twenty years. He has also served as a tax assessor in Hillsdale County for 22 years. A past member of the nonprofit 501(c)(3) organization Hillsdale County Veterans Hall of Fame Inc., board of directors 2016-2017. A member of the Hillsdale County Republican Party, Bruce currently holds the post of party treasurer.

Bruce is a member of the Pittsford Lions Club, Pittsford, Michigan; Leighr A. Wright American Legion Post 53, Hillsdale, Michigan; Jonesville Rotary, Jonesville, Michigan; and the Hillsdale Masonic Lodge #32.

Caswell is a lifetime member of the Michigan State University Alumni Association and a life member of the Michigan High School Coaches Association. Bruce and his wife, Beth, have two children, Mark and Kevin. Beth Caswell currently serves as the Adams Township Clerk.

== Child State Assistance Proposal ==
Caswell came under fire from Michigan Public Radio for a 2011 proposal to issue the Michigan state $80 clothing allowance for children that receive state welfare assistance as an $80 gift card redeemable at secondhand clothing stores, such as Goodwill and Salvation Army, rather than just adding another $80 credit to the Bridge Card account that would be untraceable in how it was actually spent. The Michigan Radio article and a subsequent article in the Michigan Messenger incorrectly stated that this proposal would affect the clothing allowance for foster children; however, the foster care clothing allowance is a different program and was never a part of Caswell's proposal. Under the current system, DHS issues each year, on average, an additional $80 to a child's parents' Bridge Card for the clothing allowance. However, once deposited on the card, the state has no way to ensure that parents actually spend the clothing allowance money on clothing for their child. In making the proposal, Caswell said, "I never had anything new...I got all the hand-me-downs. And my dad, he did a lot of shopping at the Salvation Army, and his comment was — and quite frankly it's true — once you're out of the store and you walk down the street, nobody knows where you bought your clothes."

After contact from a constituent, he revised the plan to also include major retailers, but the gift cards will remain only redeemable for clothes and shoes. “My sole goal in this proposal is to make sure that children receive the clothing allowance that the state has provided for them and not have it used for anything else,” said Caswell. “I believe this solution will go a long way to achieving that objective. If anyone else has a better idea on how we can ensure the money goes for clothing alone, I very much welcome those suggestions and urge you to share your ideas with me. I appreciate the input I have already received that has resulted in making the proposal better.”
