= Michigan's 58th House of Representatives district =

American legislative district

Michigan's 58th State House of Representatives district
Representative
Ron Robinson; R–Utica
- Demographics: 77.4% White; 8.3% Black; 2.6% Hispanic; 6.6% Asian; 0.1% Native American; 0.3% Other; 4.7% Multiracial
- Population (2024): 90,333

Michigan's 58th House of Representatives district is a legislative district within the Michigan House of Representatives located in Macomb County. The district was created in 1965, when the Michigan Supreme Court ordered the reapportionment of state legislative districts from a county-based system to a proportional one following the Supreme Court case Reynolds v. Sims. It is currently represented by Republican Ron Robinson of Utica.

== List of representatives ==
Representative	Party	Years	Residence	Notes
Robert E. Dingwell	Democratic	1965–1966	Lansing	
Philip O. Pittenger	Republican	1967–1970	Lansing	
Frederick L. Stackable	Republican	1971–1974	Lansing	
Thomas M. Holcomb	Democratic	1975–1978	Lansing	
Debbie Stabenow	Democratic	1979–1990	Lansing	
Dianne Byrum	Democratic	1991–1992	Onondaga	
Michael Earl Nye	Republican	1993–1998	Litchfield	
Steve Vear	Republican	1999–2002	Hillsdale	
Bruce Caswell	Republican	2003–2008	Hillsdale	
Kenneth Kurtz	Republican	2009–2014	Coldwater	
Eric Leutheuser	Republican	2015–2020	Hillsdale	
Andrew Fink	Republican	2021–2022	Hillsdale	
Nate Shannon	Democratic	2023–2025	Sterling Heights	
Ron Robinson	Republican	2025–present	Utica	
Katrina Manetta	Democratic	(Note: Member-elect.)	Shelby	

== Historical district boundaries ==
Map	Description	Apportionment Plan	Notes
	Ingham County (part): Alaiedon Township; Aurelius Township; Delhi Township; Lansing (part); Lansing Township (part)	1964 Apportionment Plan	
	Eaton County (part): Delta Township (part); Lansing (part); Ingham County (part): Alaiedon Township; Delhi Township; Lansing (part); Mason	1972 Apportionment Plan	
	Ingham County (part): Alaiedon Township; Aurelius Township; Bunker Hill Township; Delhi Township; Ingham Township; Lansing (part); Leroy Township; Mason; Onondaga Township; Stockbridge Township; Vevay Township; White Oak Township	1982 Apportionment Plan	
	Branch County; Hillsdale County	1992 Apportionment Plan	
	Branch County; Hillsdale County	2001 Apportionment Plan	
	Branch County; Hillsdale County	2011 Apportionment Plan	
	Macomb County (part): Shelby Charter Township (part); Sterling Heights (part); Utica; Warren (part)	2021 Apportionment Plan (Note: Referred to as the Hickory plan.)	

== Recent elections ==
2026 Michigan House of Representatives election
Party	Candidate	Votes	%
Democratic	Katrina Manetta	21,058	52.64
Republican	Ron Robinson (incumbent)	18,949	47.36
Total votes		40,007	100
Democratic gain from Republican			

2024 Michigan House of Representatives election
Party	Candidate	Votes	%
Republican	Ron Robinson	24,925	53.19
Democratic	Nate Shannon (incumbent)	21,939	46.81
Total votes		46,864	100
Republican gain from Democratic			

2022 Michigan House of Representatives election
Party	Candidate	Votes	%
Democratic	Nate Shannon	18,122	51.32
Republican	Michelle Smith	17,183	48.66
Write-In	Giovanni Ndrea	5	0.01
Total votes		35,510	100
Democratic gain from Republican			

2020 Michigan House of Representatives election
Party	Candidate	Votes	%
Republican	Andrew Fink	30,208	71.22
Democratic	Tamara C. Barnes	12,208	28.78
Total votes		42,416	100
Republican hold			

=== 2010s ===
2018 Michigan House of Representatives election
Party	Candidate	Votes	%
Republican	Eric Leutheuser	22,070	71.1
Democratic	Tamara C. Barnes	8,973	28.9
Total votes		31,043	100
Republican hold			

2016 Michigan House of Representatives election
Party	Candidate	Votes	%
Republican	Eric Leutheuser	27,444	75.4
Democratic	Mary Hamaty	8,968	24.6
Total votes		36,412	100
Republican hold			

2014 Michigan House of Representatives election
Party	Candidate	Votes	%
Republican	Eric Leutheuser	17,010	71.5
Democratic	Amaryllis Thomas	6,783	28.5
Total votes		23,793	100
Republican hold			

2012 Michigan House of Representatives election
Party	Candidate	Votes	%
Republican	Kenneth Kurtz	24,438	69.8
Democratic	Amaryllis Thomas	10,565	30.2
Total votes		35,003	100
Republican hold			

2010 Michigan House of Representatives election
Party	Candidate	Votes	%
Republican	Kenneth Kurtz	21,222	100
Total votes		21,222	100
Republican hold			

2008 Michigan House of Representatives election
Party	Candidate	Votes	%
Republican	Kenneth Kurtz	24,487	66.8
Democratic	Jeane Ann Kennedy Windsor	12,151	33.2
Total votes		36,638	100
Republican hold			
