= Grass Lake Charter Township, Michigan =

Grass Lake Township, Michigan
- Charter township
- Grass Lake Charter Township
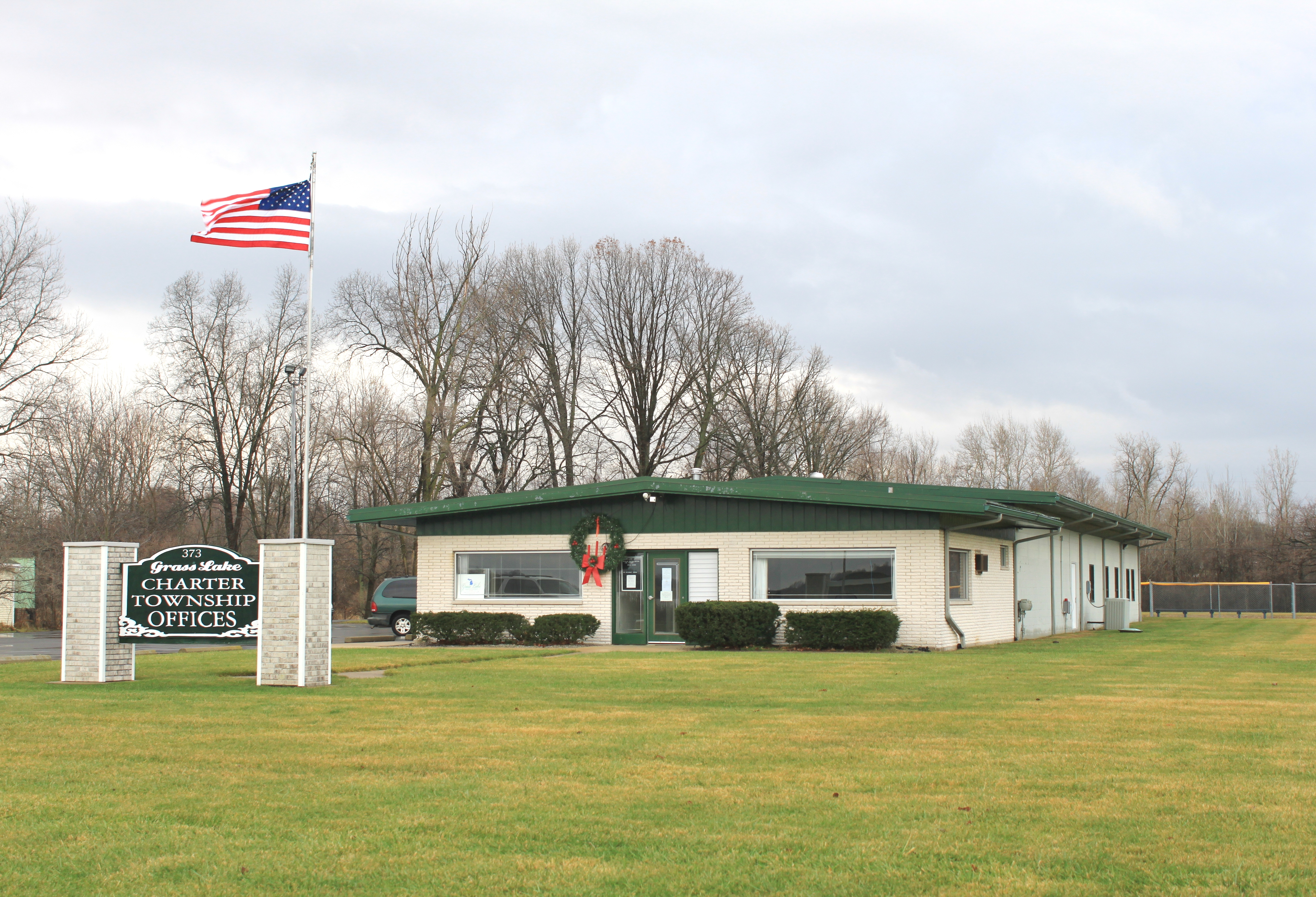
- Grass Lake Township offices

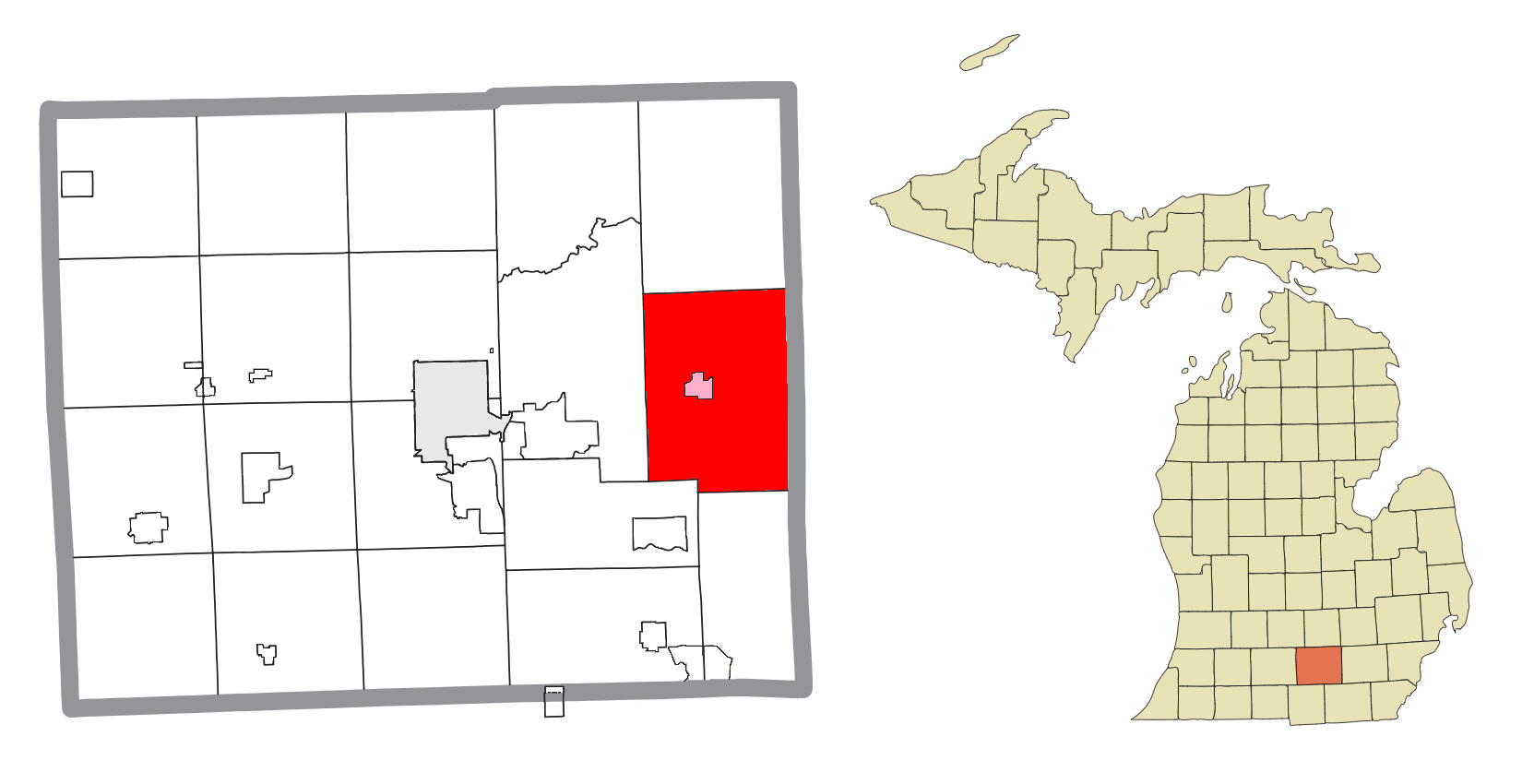
- Location within Jackson County (red) and the administered village of Grass Lake (pink)

- Location within the state of Michigan
- Coordinates: 42°15′17″N 84°12′02″W
- Country: United States
- State: Michigan
- County: Jackson

Government
  - Supervisor: John Lesinski
  - Clerk: Gail Harris

Area
  - Total: 48.01 sq mi (124.3 km^{2})
  - Land: 46.43 sq mi (120.3 km^{2})
  - Water: 1.58 sq mi (4.1 km^{2})
- Elevation: 1,020 ft (311 m)

Population (2020)
  - Total: 6,069
  - Density: 130.7/sq mi (50.47/km^{2})
- Time zone: UTC-5 (Eastern (EST))
  - Summer (DST): UTC-4 (EDT)
- ZIP code(s): 49201 (Jackson); 49240 (Grass Lake)
- Area code: 517
- FIPS code: 26-34500
- GNIS feature ID: 1626388
- Website: Official website

Grass Lake Charter Township is a charter township of Jackson County in the U.S. state of Michigan. The population was 6,069 at the 2020 census, up from 5,684 at the 2010 census.

== Communities ==
- Grass Lake is a village in the central portion of the township.

== Geography ==
According to the United States Census Bureau, the township has a total area of 48.01 square miles (124.35 km^{2}), of which 46.43 square miles (120.25 km^{2}) is land and 1.58 square miles (4.09 km^{2}) (3.29%) is water.

The township is on the eastern side of Jackson County and is bordered to the east by Washtenaw County. The village of Grass Lake is in the center of the township. Interstate 94 runs through the northern part of the township, with access from Exits 150 and 153. I-94 leads east 24 miles (39 km) to Ann Arbor and west 10 miles (16 km) to Jackson, the local county seat.

Grass Lake is a water body in the center of the township, and the land primarily drains west as part of the Grand River watershed.

== Demographics ==
As of the census of 2000, there were 4,586 people, 1,653 households, and 1,292 families residing in the township. The population density was 97.2 inhabitants per square mile (37.5/km^{2}). There were 1,804 housing units at an average density of 38.2 per square mile (14.7/km^{2}). The racial makeup of the township was 98.10% White, 0.50% African American, 0.31% Native American, 0.09% Asian, 0.04% Pacific Islander, 0.17% from other races, and 0.78% from two or more races. Hispanic or Latino of any race were 1.07% of the population.

There were 1,653 households, out of which 36.1% had children under the age of 18 living with them, 66.2% were married couples living together, 7.4% had a female householder with no husband present, and 21.8% were non-families. 17.0% of all households were made up of individuals, and 5.5% had someone living alone who was 65 years of age or older. The average household size was 2.69 and the average family size was 3.00.

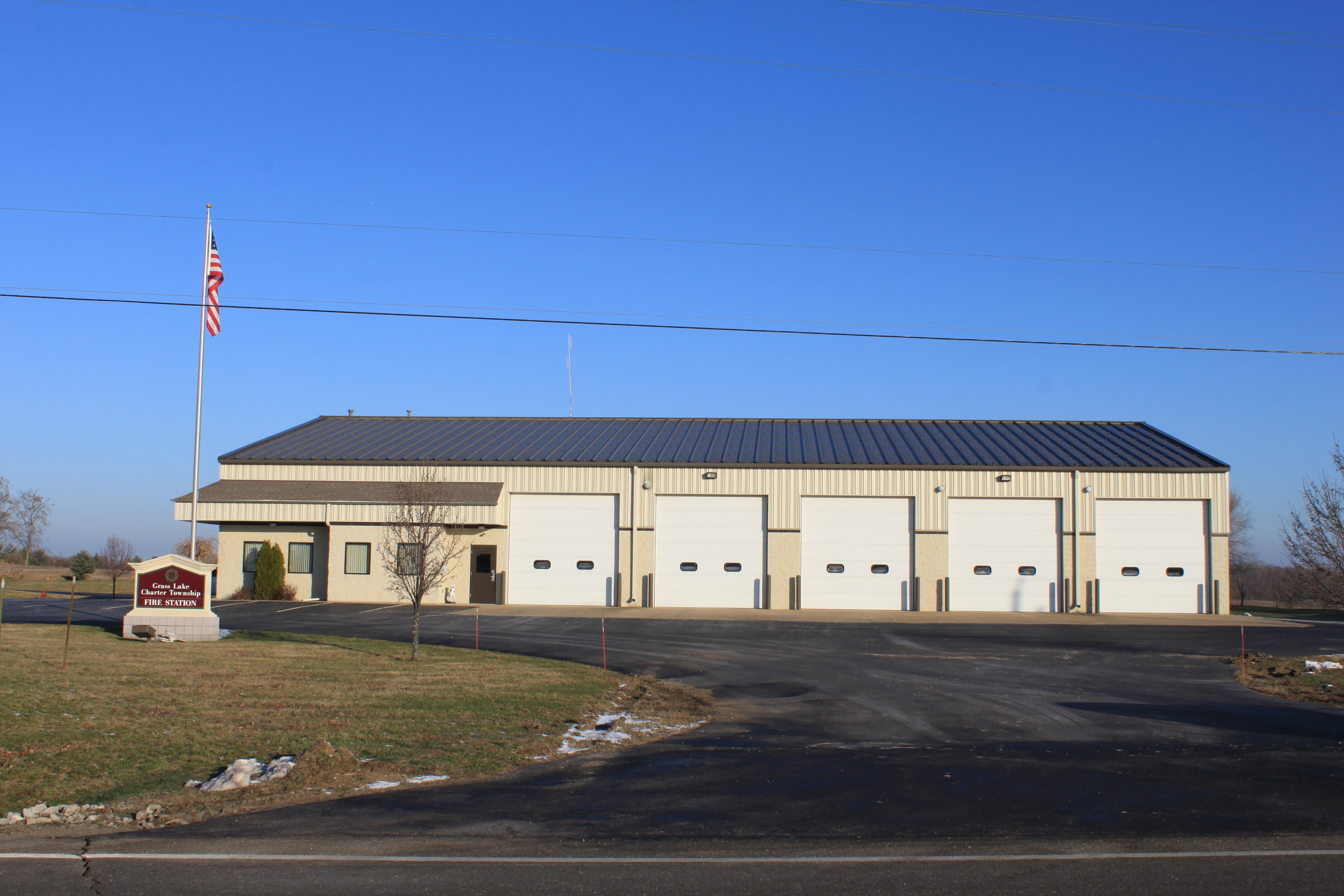
Grass Lake Township Fire Station

In the township the population was spread out, with 26.2% under the age of 18, 6.1% from 18 to 24, 30.4% from 25 to 44, 24.6% from 45 to 64, and 12.8% who were 65 years of age or older. The median age was 38 years. For every 100 females, there were 96.6 males. For every 100 females age 18 and over, there were 95.2 males.

The median income for a household in the township was $55,280, and the median income for a family was $61,027. Males had a median income of $47,228 versus $30,805 for females. The per capita income for the township was $23,976. About 0.6% of families and 2.3% of the population were below the poverty line, including 0.7% of those under age 18 and 3.1% of those age 65 or over.
