= Sarah Lightner =

American politician

Member of the Michigan House of Representatives
- Incumbent
- Assumed office January 9, 2019
- Preceded by: Brett Roberts
- Constituency: 65th district (2019–2022); 45th district (2023–present)

Personal details
- Party: Republican
- Spouse: David
- Children: 2
- Education: Lansing Community College
- Occupation: Paralegal, politician
- Website: Elect Sarah Lightner

Sarah Lynn Lightner is an American politician serving as a member of the Michigan House of Representatives since 2019, currently representing the 45th district. She is a member of the Republican Party.

== Education ==
Lightner earned an associate degree in Paralegal from Lansing Community College in Lansing, Michigan.

== Career ==
Lightner and her husband are business owner and operator in hay baling and wrapping, and deer processing.

Lightner was a paralegal until 2015.

In 2013, Lightner became a Commissioner for Jackson County, Michigan. In March 2015, Lightner was appointed by Governor Snyder as the Michigan Association of Counties Representative on the Criminal Justice Policy Commission.

On November 6, 2018, Lightner won the election and became a Republican member of Michigan House of Representatives for District 65. Lightner defeated Terri McKinnon and Jason B. Rees with 59.26% of the votes.

Following redistricting, Lightner ran in the 45th district in 2022, winning reelection. She was reelected in 2024.

Lightner is the vice-chair person of Subcommittee on General Government. Lightner is also the vice-chair person of Subcommittee on Judiciary.

== Personal life ==
Lightner's husband is David. They have two children. Lightner and her family live in Springport, Michigan.

== See also ==
- 2018 Michigan House of Representatives election
