= Michigan Center, Michigan =

- Census-designated place (CDP) & unincorporated community
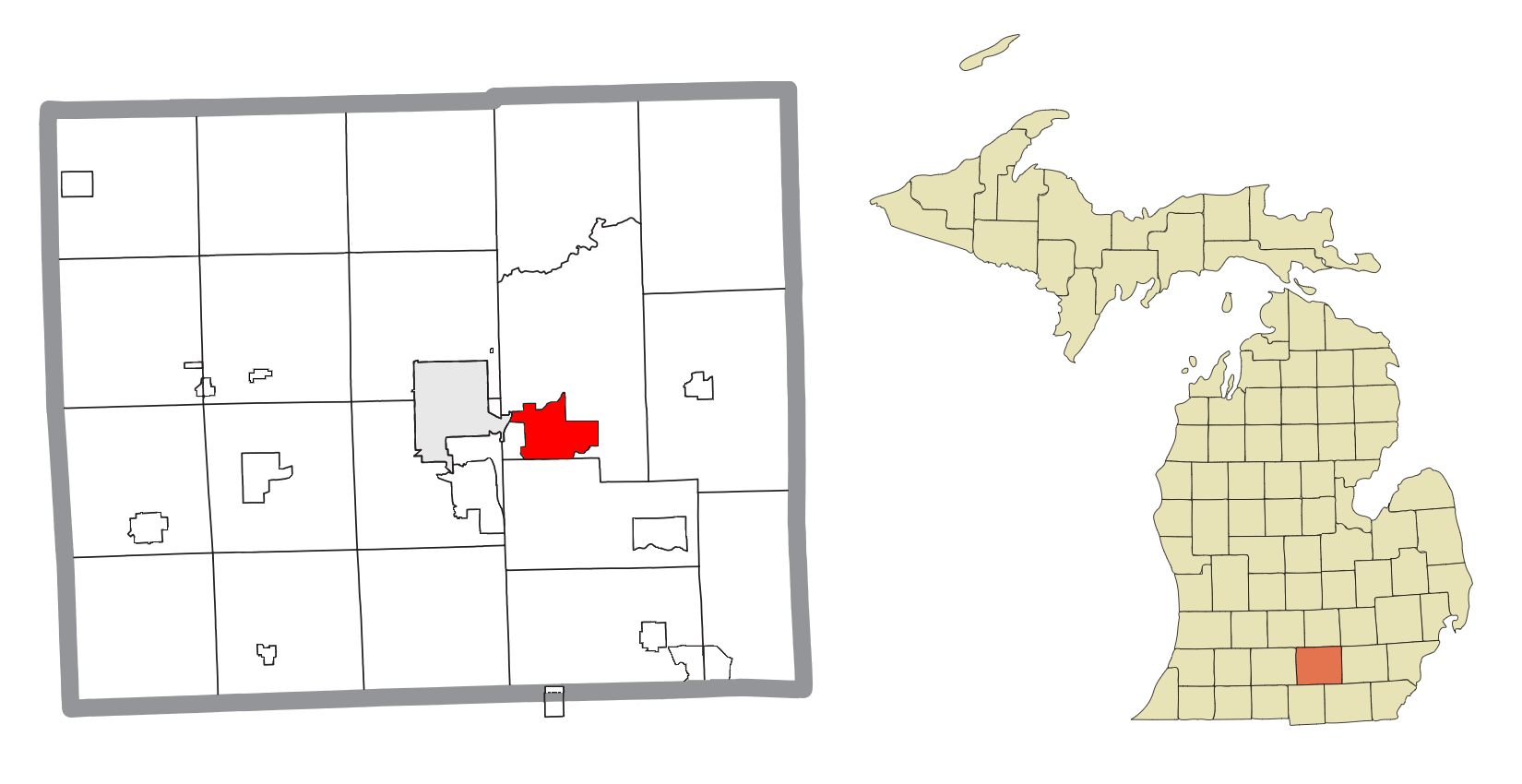
- Location within Jackson County

- Location within the state of Michigan Michigan Center (the United States)
- Coordinates: 42°13′59″N 84°19′38″W
- Country: United States
- State: Michigan
- County: Jackson
- Township: Leoni
- Platted: 1837

Area
  - Total: 5.70 sq mi (14.76 km^{2})
  - Land: 5.04 sq mi (13.06 km^{2})
  - Water: 0.66 sq mi (1.70 km^{2})
- Elevation: 945 ft (288 m)

Population (2020)
  - Total: 4,609
  - Density: 914.4/sq mi (353.04/km^{2})
- Time zone: UTC-5 (Eastern (EST))
  - Summer (DST): UTC-4 (EDT)
- ZIP code(s): 49254
- Area code: 517
- FIPS code: 26-53580
- GNIS feature ID: 0632205

Michigan Center is an unincorporated community and census-designated place (CDP) in Jackson County in the U.S. state of Michigan. As of the 2020 census, Michigan Center had a population of 4,609. The CDP is located within Leoni Township on the eastern border of the city of Jackson.

Michigan Center was platted as "Michigan Centre" in 1837 by Abel Fitch and Paul Ring, although there were settlements in the area from at least 1834. The name was presumably derived from the proximity to the Michigan meridian which divided the state into eastern and western portions for surveying. The community is not close to any sort of geographical center of the state. Fitch became the first postmaster in 1838.

Michigan Center began developing as a mill town on a tributary of the Grand River. There was a station on the Michigan Central Railroad. However, nearby Jackson rapidly outpaced Michigan Center, which has since become a bedroom community to the city.

== Geography ==
According to the United States Census Bureau, the CDP has a total area of 5.70 square miles (14.76 km^{2}), of which 5.04 square miles (13.05 km^{2}) is land and 0.66 square miles (1.71 km^{2}) (11.58%) is water.

Michigan Center is in eastern Jackson County, in the southern part of Leoni Township. The CDP shares a slight western border with the city of Jackson but is otherwise surrounded by Leoni Township on the north, east, and west with a southern boundary with Napoleon Township.

The community is situated primarily around the northern end of Center Lake, formed by a dam on a tributary of the Grand River in 1911. Several other nearby lakes on the same tributary form a connected chain of lakes: Round Lake, Price Lake, Moon Lake, Little Dollar Lake, Dollar Lake, Olcott Lake, Little Olcott Lake, Wolf Lake and Little Wolf Lake. Local residents travel between the first several lakes using small boats or personal watercraft.

== Demographics ==
Historical population
Census	Pop.	Note	%±
2020	4,609		—
U.S. Decennial Census

=== 2020 census ===
As of the 2020 census, Michigan Center had a population of 4,609. The median age was 43.0 years. 20.8% of residents were under the age of 18 and 18.2% of residents were 65 years of age or older. For every 100 females there were 105.6 males, and for every 100 females age 18 and over there were 104.4 males age 18 and over.

96.0% of residents lived in urban areas, while 4.0% lived in rural areas.

There were 1,963 households in Michigan Center, of which 27.1% had children under the age of 18 living in them. Of all households, 45.4% were married-couple households, 21.0% were households with a male householder and no spouse or partner present, and 23.2% were households with a female householder and no spouse or partner present. About 27.8% of all households were made up of individuals and 12.3% had someone living alone who was 65 years of age or older.

There were 2,127 housing units, of which 7.7% were vacant. The homeowner vacancy rate was 1.2% and the rental vacancy rate was 4.3%.

Racial composition as of the 2020 census
Race	Number	Percent
White	4,191	90.9%
Black or African American	61	1.3%
American Indian and Alaska Native	19	0.4%
Asian	13	0.3%
Native Hawaiian and Other Pacific Islander	0	0.0%
Some other race	41	0.9%
Two or more races	284	6.2%
Hispanic or Latino (of any race)	143	3.1%

=== 2000 census ===
As of the census of 2000, there were 4,641 people, 1,856 households, and 1,308 families residing in the CDP. The population density was 895.6 inhabitants per square mile (345.8/km^{2}). There were 1,961 housing units at an average density of 378.4 per square mile (146.1/km^{2}). The racial makeup of the CDP was 97.72% White, 0.34% Black or African American, 0.43% Native American, 0.43% Asian, 0.26% from other races, and 0.82% from two or more races. Hispanic or Latino residents of any race were 1.53% of the population.

There were 1,856 households, out of which 29.2% had children under the age of 18 living with them, 55.1% were married couples living together, 10.0% had a female householder with no husband present, and 29.5% were non-families. 23.9% of all households were made up of individuals, and 10.1% had someone living alone who was 65 years of age or older. The average household size was 2.49 and the average family size was 2.94.

In the CDP, 23.5% of the population was under the age of 18, 6.8% was from 18 to 24, 30.3% from 25 to 44, 24.2% from 45 to 64, and 15.2% was 65 years of age or older. The median age was 39 years. For every 100 females, there were 101.1 males. For every 100 females age 18 and over, there were 99.8 males.

The median income for a household in the CDP was $43,056, and the median income for a family was $49,159. Males had a median income of $38,233 versus $29,048 for females. The per capita income for the CDP was $18,701. About 3.6% of families and 4.9% of the population were below the poverty line, including 4.3% of those under age 18 and 6.8% of those age 65 or over.

== Local events ==
Michigan Center hosts the annual Carp Carnival at Leoni Township Park in June. The festival features a parade, fishing contest, midway games and rides, chicken barbecue dinners and beer tent.

== Education ==
It is in the Michigan Center School District.

== See also ==
- Michigan Center High School
