= Pontiac Township, Michigan =

- Defunct charter township
- Former location within the state of Michigan
- Coordinates: 42°41′00″N 83°14′00″W
- Country: United States
- State: Michigan
- County: Oakland
- Settled: 1818
- Organized: 1827
- Defunct: 1984
- Elevation: 961 ft (293 m)
- Time zone: UTC-5 (EST)
  - Summer (DST): UTC-4 (EDT)

Pontiac Township was a charter township in Oakland County in the U.S. state of Michigan. The area consisted of what is now the cities of Pontiac, Auburn Hills, and Lake Angelus. Pontiac Township was bordered on the north by Brown Road and Dutton Road, on the east by South Adams Road (including a line extending north from South Adams Road), on the south by South Boulevard, and on the west by Telegraph Road.

Although the township no longer exists as a civil entity, it is still used as a survey township for land use purposes.

== History ==
In 1818, Colonel Stephen Mack purchased 1280 acres (5.2 km^{2}) of land that was to become the city of Pontiac. In 1820, Pontiac became the county seat of Oakland County. Pontiac incorporated as a village in 1837 and later as a city in 1861.

The township was organized as a civil entity in 1827. Under Michigan law, cities are independent of township governance, while villages may continue to receive some services from the township. Thus, as Pontiac grew, it annexed land from the township.

The village of Auburn was platted in 1826 and was renamed Amy in 1880. In 1917, it was renamed again as Auburn Heights.

Pontiac Township attempted to incorporate as Pontiac Heights in 1971, but the request was denied by state officials. Pontiac Township became a charter township in 1978, to protect itself from further annexation. In 1983, it formally became the city of Auburn Hills and included Auburn Heights.

Lake Angelus incorporated as a village in 1930 and became a city in 1984.\
