= Leoni Township, Michigan =

- Civil township
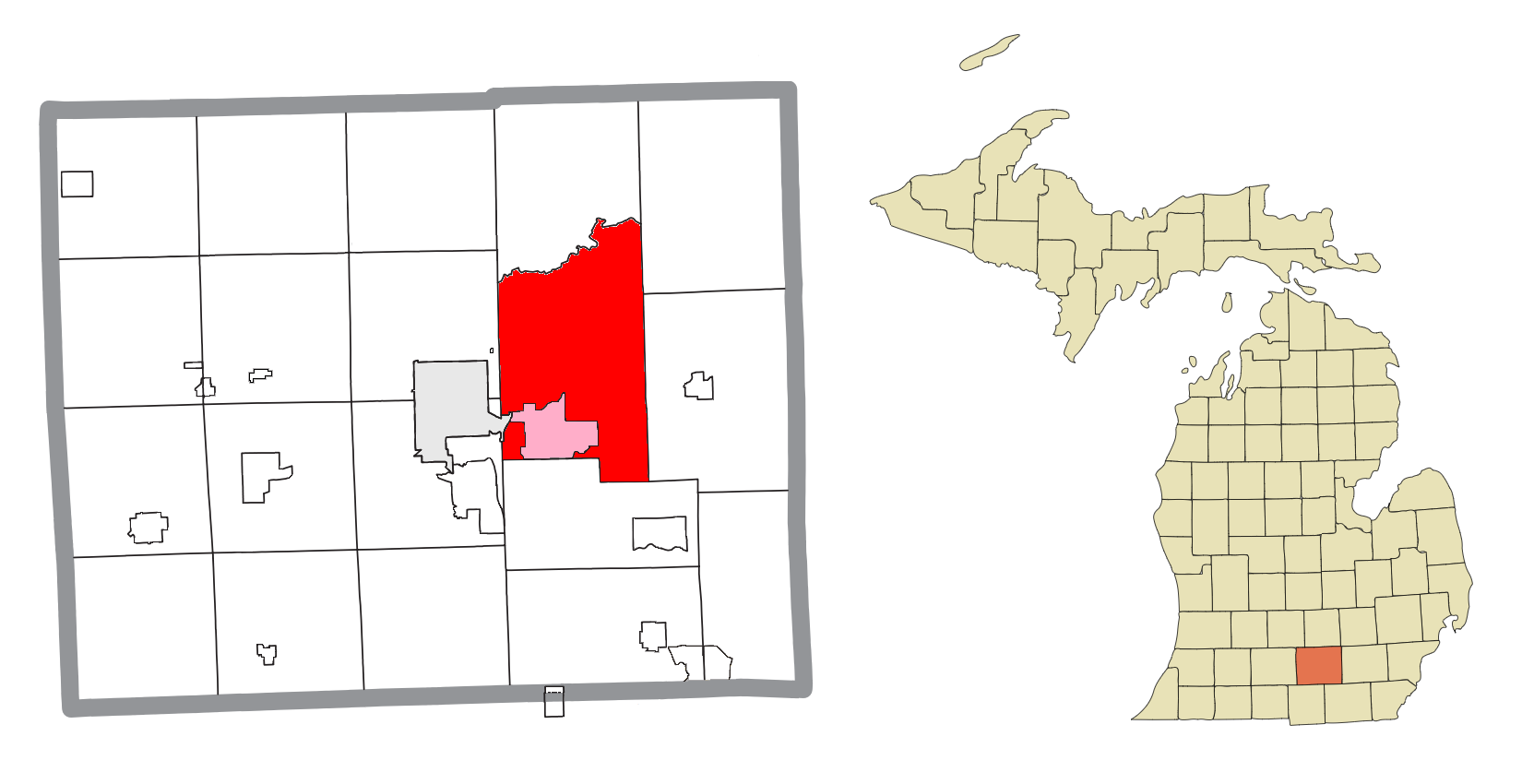
- Location within Jackson County (red) and the administered Michigan Center community (pink)

- Location within the state of Michigan Leoni Township (the United States)
- Coordinates: 42°15′17″N 84°18′43″W
- Country: United States
- State: Michigan
- County: Jackson

Government
  - Supervisor: Howard Linnabary
  - Clerk: Kerry Pickett

Area
  - Total: 51.22 sq mi (132.7 km^{2})
  - Land: 48.54 sq mi (125.7 km^{2})
  - Water: 2.68 sq mi (6.9 km^{2})
- Elevation: 991 ft (302 m)

Population (2020)
  - Total: 13,847
  - Density: 285.3/sq mi (110.1/km^{2})
- Time zone: UTC-5 (Eastern (EST))
  - Summer (DST): UTC-4 (EDT)
- ZIP code(s): 49201–49203 (Jackson); 49240 (Grass Lake); 49254 (Michigan Center); 49259 (Munith)
- Area code: 517
- FIPS code: 26-46980
- GNIS feature ID: 1626605
- Website: Official website

Leoni Township is a civil township of Jackson County in the U.S. state of Michigan. The population was 13,847 at the 2020 census.

== Communities ==
- Leoni is a small unincorporated community in the southeastern part of the township, 7 miles (11 km) east of Jackson, the county seat.
- Michigan Center is an unincorporated community and a census-designated place in the southwestern part of the township.

== Geography ==
According to the United States Census Bureau, the township has a total area of 51.22 square miles (132.66 km^{2}), of which 48.54 square miles (125.72 km^{2}) is land and 2.68 square miles (6.94 km^{2}) (5.23%) is water.

Center Lake is on the township's southern boundary and is adjacent to Michigan Center. Gilletts Lake, Brill Lake, and Goose Lake are in the central region of the township. The Portage River runs close to the northern border of the township. The entire township is part of the Grand River watershed.

== Demographics ==
As of the census of 2000, there were 13,459 people, 5,240 households, and 3,825 families residing in the township. The population density was 274.1 inhabitants per square mile (105.8/km^{2}). There were 5,568 housing units at an average density of 113.4 per square mile (43.8/km^{2}). The racial makeup of the township was 97.04% White, 0.82% African American, 0.31% Native American, 0.33% Asian, 0.02% Pacific Islander, 0.31% from other races, and 1.17% from two or more races. Hispanic or Latino of any race were 1.62% of the population.

There were 5,240 households, out of which 33.4% had children under the age of 18 living with them, 56.7% were married couples living together, 11.5% had a female householder with no husband present, and 27.0% were non-families. 21.8% of all households were made up of individuals, and 8.7% had someone living alone who was 65 years of age or older. The average household size was 2.56 and the average family size was 2.97.

In the township the population was spread out, with 25.9% under the age of 18, 7.0% from 18 to 24, 30.0% from 25 to 44, 24.6% from 45 to 64, and 12.4% who were 65 years of age or older. The median age was 38 years. For every 100 females, there were 98.2 males. For every 100 females age 18 and over, there were 96.7 males.

The median income for a household in the township was $43,551, and the median income for a family was $47,032. Males had a median income of $38,306 versus $27,870 for females. The per capita income for the township was $19,329. About 6.5% of families and 7.9% of the population were below the poverty line, including 10.6% of those under age 18 and 6.1% of those age 65 or over.
