= Grass Lake, Michigan =

- Village
- Village of Grass Lake
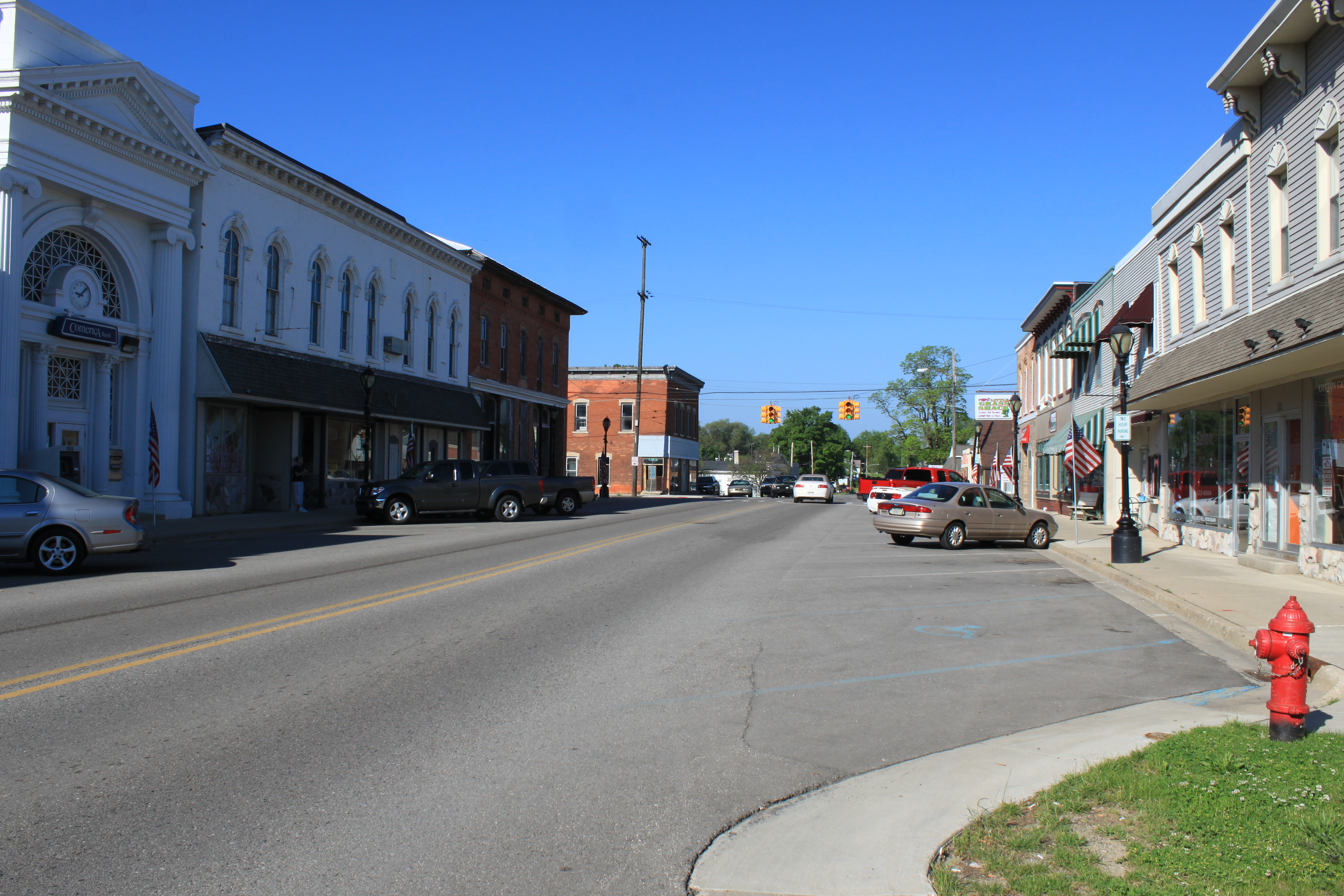
- Facing west along Michigan Avenue

- Seal

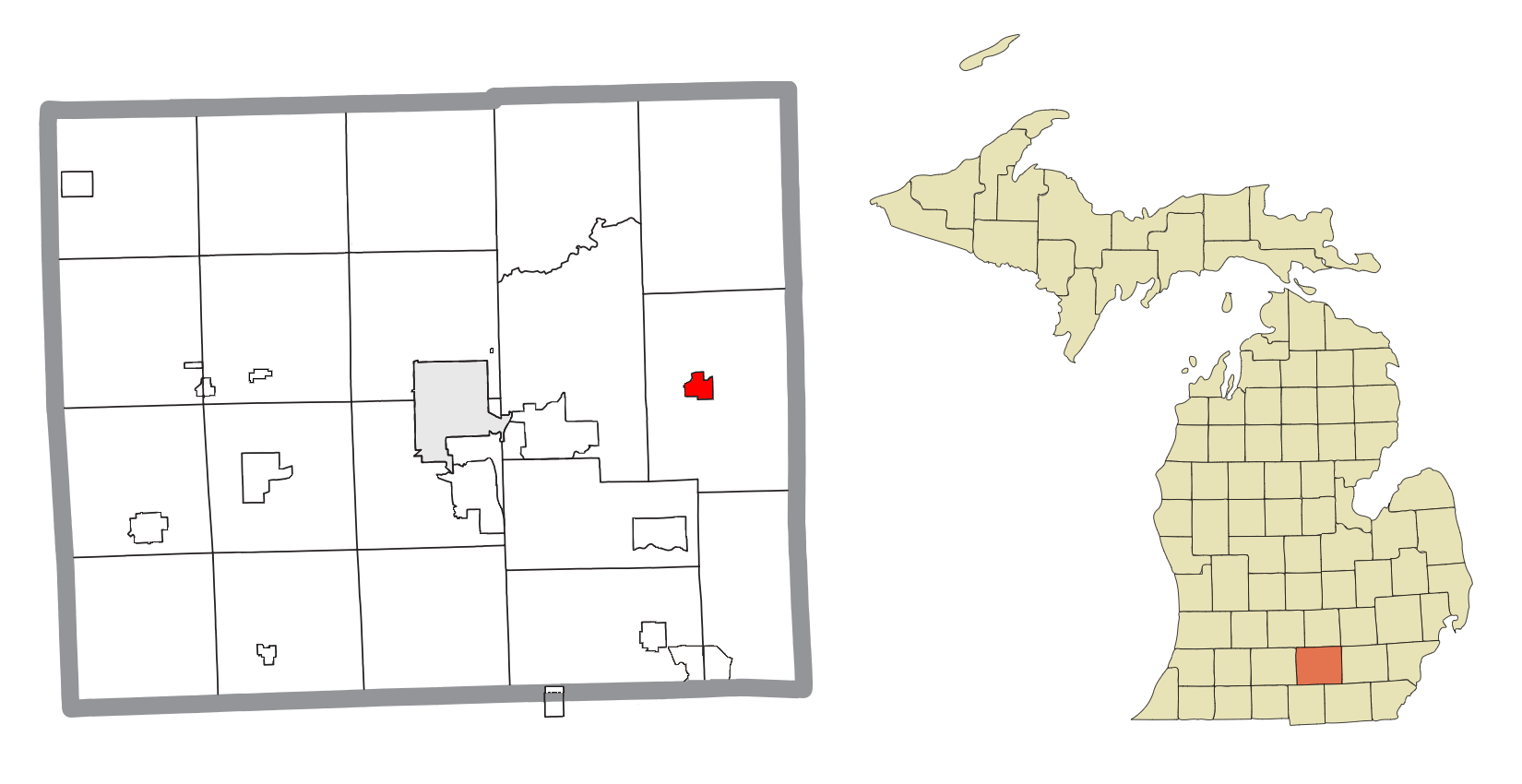
- Location within Jackson County

- Location within the state of Michigan
- Coordinates: 42°15′04″N 84°12′32″W
- Country: United States
- State: Michigan
- County: Jackson
- Township: Grass Lake
- Established: 1842

Government
  - Type: Village council
  - President: David Keener
  - Manager: Sabrina Edgar
  - Clerk: Jennifer Keener

Area
  - Total: 0.94 sq mi (2.44 km^{2})
  - Land: 0.94 sq mi (2.43 km^{2})
  - Water: 0 sq mi (0.00 km^{2})
- Elevation: 991 ft (302 m)

Population (2020)
  - Total: 1,105
  - Density: 1,176/sq mi (454.1/km^{2})
- Time zone: UTC-5 (Eastern (EST))
  - Summer (DST): UTC-4 (EDT)
- ZIP code(s): 49240
- Area code: 517
- FIPS code: 26-34480
- GNIS feature ID: 0627210
- Website: Official website

Grass Lake is a village in Jackson County in the U.S. state of Michigan. The population was 1,105 at the 2020 census. The village is located just south of Interstate 94 in Grass Lake Township.

== History ==
In 1842, the Michigan Central Railroad bypassed the original village and built a depot 1.5 miles (2.4 km) to the west when an offer of $1.50 an acre was offered (compared to $2.00 an acre at the previous city center) . The village was relocated to this new location - its current location - to be closer to the rail depot and some of the original buildings were relocated to the new site.

In 1887, Grass Lake was awarded a stone depot designed by the same architects, Spier and Rohns, and with stone from the same quarry as the Ann Arbor station. The historic Romanesque Whistle Stop Depot offers displays of local interest and is available for rental.

The Grass Lake Historical Society also operates the Coe House Museum. The home was constructed in 1871 for Henry Van Winkle, who owned and operated a hardware store and farm equipment dealership in Grass Lake. In 1972 the home was donated to the historical society by Mrs. Myrta Coe. This Tuscan Vernacular home has been furnished to represent a typical home of the Victorian Era.

== Geography ==
According to the United States Census Bureau, the village has a total area of 0.94 square miles (2.43 km^{2}), all land.

== Demographics ==
Historical population
| Census | Pop. | Note | %± |
|---|---|---|---|
| 1860 | 479 | | — |
| 1880 | 682 | | — |
| 1890 | 617 | | −9.5% |
| 1900 | 648 | | 5.0% |
| 1910 | 760 | | 17.3% |
| 1920 | 744 | | −2.1% |
| 1930 | 804 | | 8.1% |
| 1940 | 810 | | 0.7% |
| 1950 | 878 | | 8.4% |
| 1960 | 1,037 | | 18.1% |
| 1970 | 1,061 | | 2.3% |
| 1980 | 962 | | −9.3% |
| 1990 | 903 | | −6.1% |
| 2000 | 1,082 | | 19.8% |
| 2010 | 1,173 | | 8.4% |
| 2020 | 1,105 | | −5.8% |
U.S. Decennial Census

=== 2010 census ===
According to the 2010 census, there were 1,173 people, 462 households, and 306 families residing in Grass Lake. The population density was 1,247.9 inhabitants per square mile (481.8/km^{2}). There were 513 housing units at an average density of 545.7 per square mile (210.7/km^{2}). The racial makeup was 94.7% White, 1.1% African American, 1.2% Native American, 0.1% Asian, 0.9% from other races, and 2.0% from two or more races. Hispanic or Latino of any race were 1.5% of the population.

Out of the 462 households located in Grass Lake, 36.4% contained children under the age of 18, 52.4% were married couples living together, 10.8% had a female householder with no husband present, 3.0% had a male householder with no wife present, and 33.8% were non-families. 27.7% of all households were made up of individuals, and 8% had someone living alone who was 65 years of age or older. The average household size was 2.54 people and the average family size was 3.13 people.

The median age in the village was 36.9 years old. 26.4% of residents were under the age of 18; 8.4% were between the ages of 18 and 24; 26.7% were from 25 to 44; 27.6% were from 45 to 64; and 10.8% were 65 years of age or older. The gender makeup of the village was 49.1% male and 50.9% female.

=== 2000 census ===
According to the 2000 census, there were 1,082 people and 421 households residing in the village. The population density was 1,124.2 inhabitants per square mile (434.1/km^{2}). There were 436 housing units at an average density of 453.0 per square mile (174.9/km^{2}). The racial makeup of the village was 98.80% White, 0.28% African American, 0.37% Native American, 0.18% Asian, and 0.37% from two or more races. Hispanic or Latino of any race were 0.65% of the population.

There were 421 households, out of which 36.8% had children under the age of 18 living with them, 53.4% were married couples living together, 12.4% had a female householder with no husband present, and 30.2% were non-families. 25.4% of all households were made up of individuals, and 9.5% had someone living alone who was 65 years of age or older. The average household size was 2.57 and the average family size was 3.06.

In the village, the population was spread out, with 26.9% under the age of 18, 9.1% from 18 to 24, 32.6% from 25 to 44, 18.3% from 45 to 64, and 13.0% who were 65 years of age or older. The median age was 35 years. For every 100 females, there were 97.8 males. For every 100 females age 18 and over, there were 94.3 males.

The median income for a household was $45,078, and the median income for a family was $52,143. About 2.2% of families and 4.3% of the population were below the poverty line, including 2.5% of those under age 18 and 4.0% of those age 65 or over.

== Religion ==
A Romanian episcopate established for serving the United States was established in Detroit in 1929. In 1937 this episcopate, headed by Bishop Policarp Morusca, established a cultural center in Grass Lake. John Radzilowski, the author of an entry on Romanians in The American Midwest: An Interpretive Encyclopedia, wrote that this center "remains the most significant Romanian cultural institution" in the United States.

== Notable people ==
- Morgen Baird, American racing driver
- William DeBilzan, American painter and sculptor

== Gallery ==
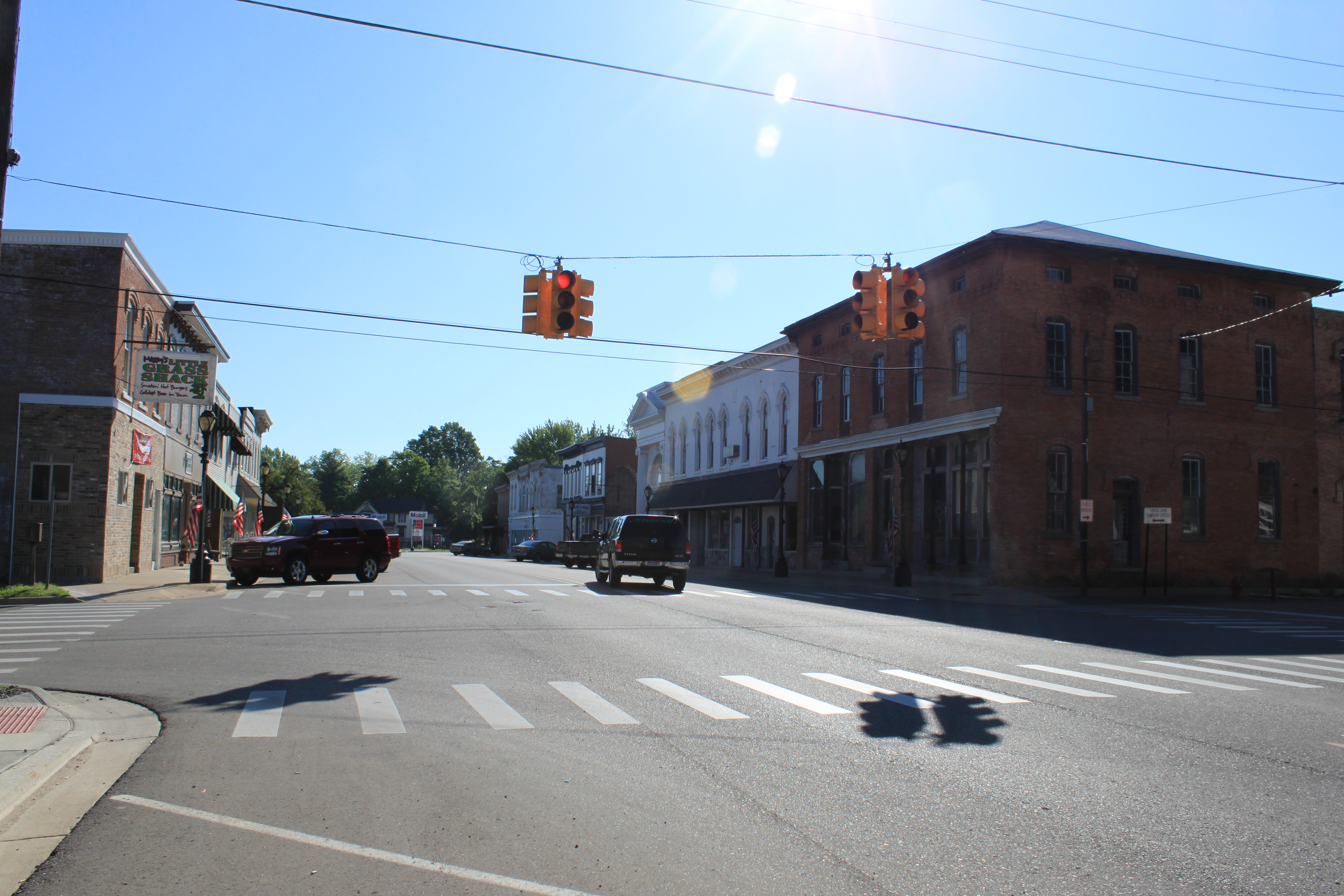
Downtown Grass Lake, Michigan Ave., facing east

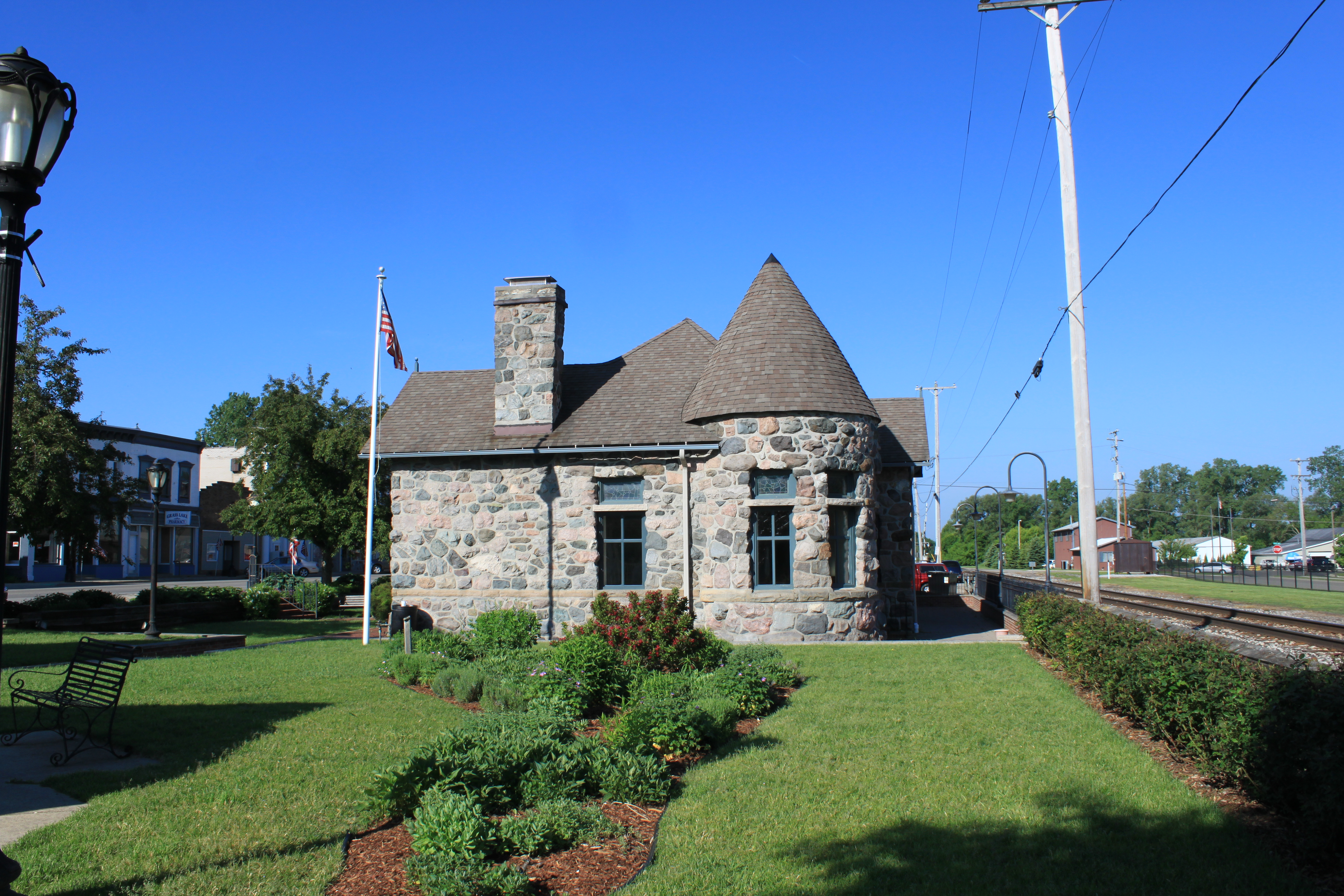
Michigan Central Railroad Depot

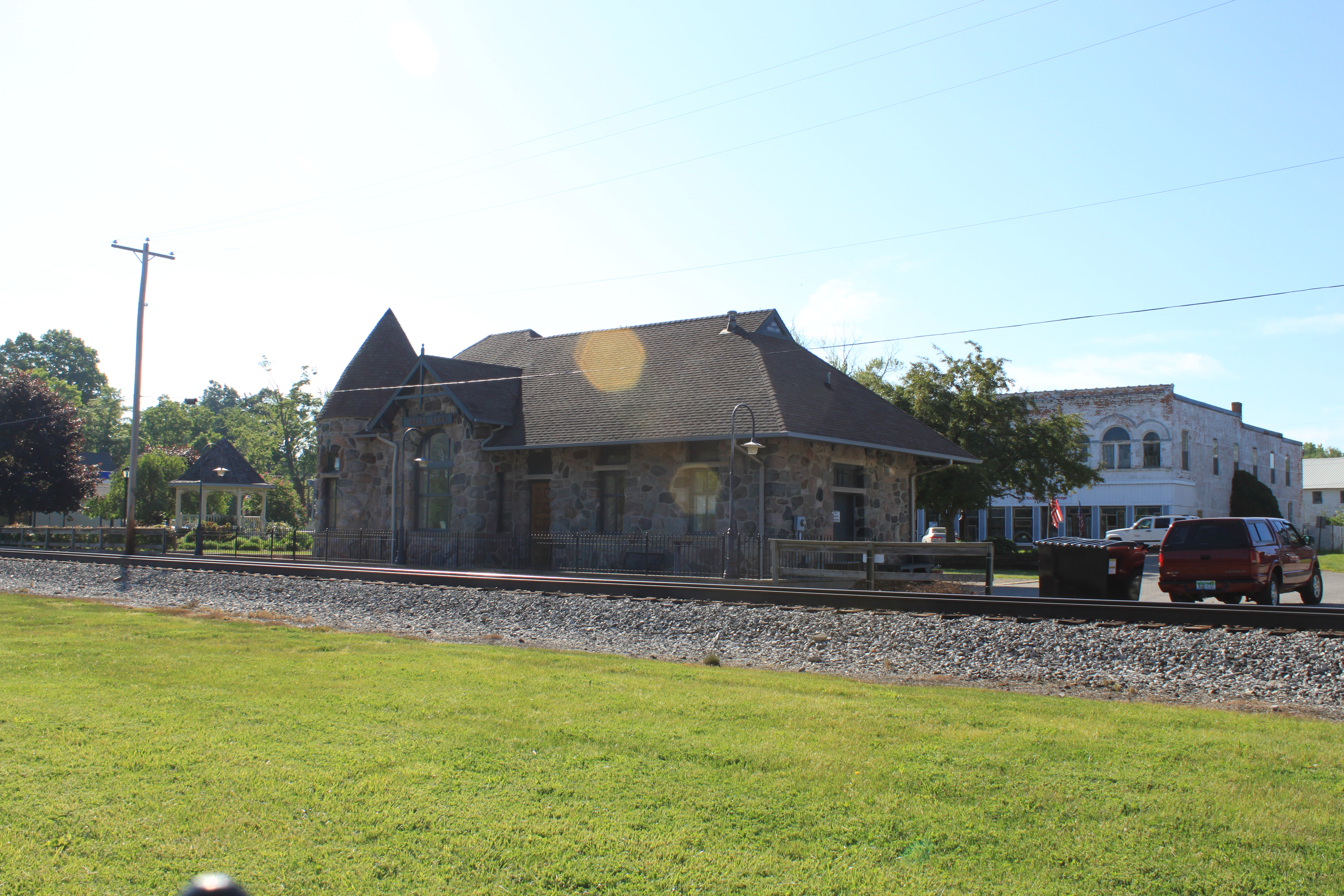
Michigan Central Railroad Depot

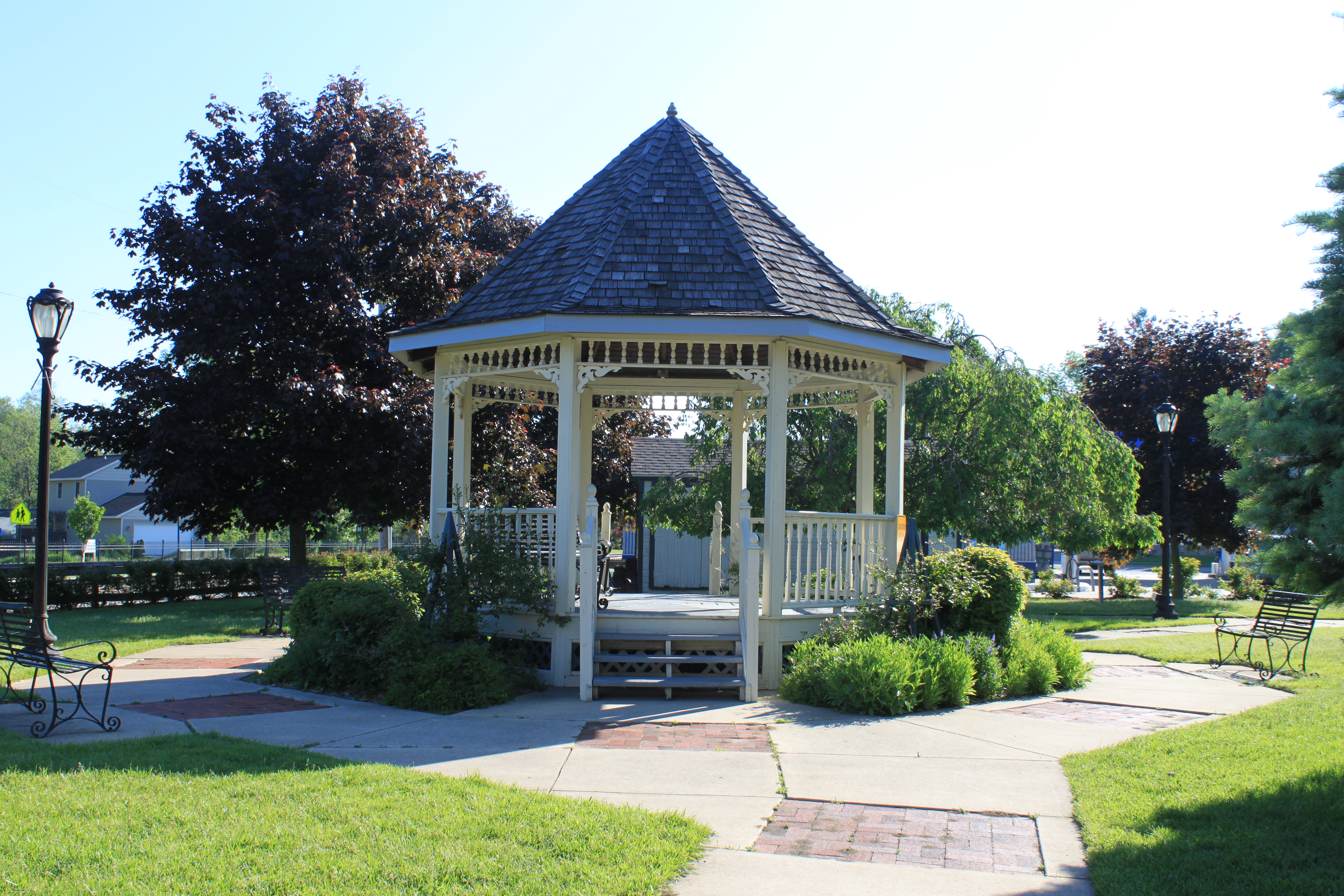
Gazebo at railroad depot

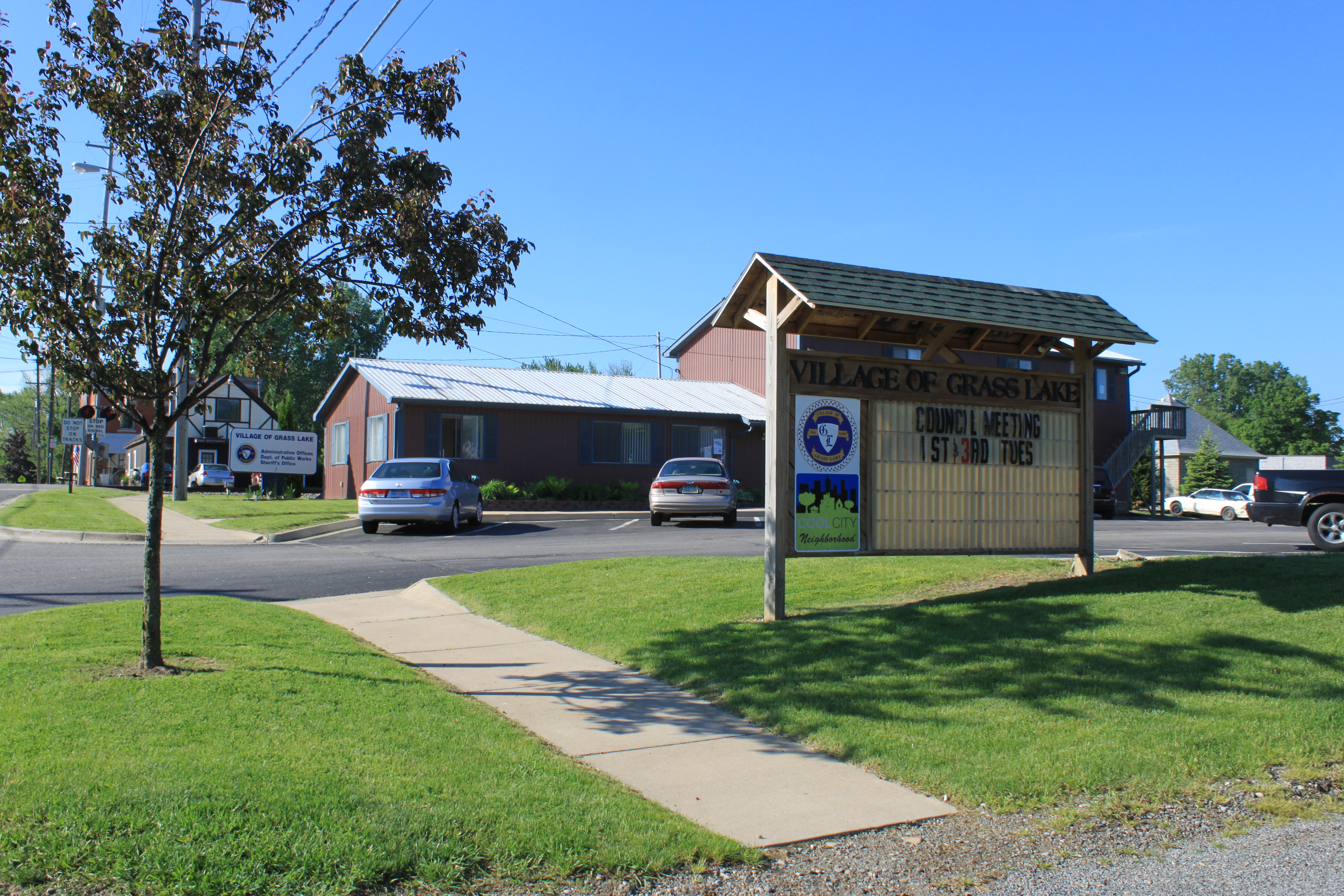
Grass Lake Village Hall

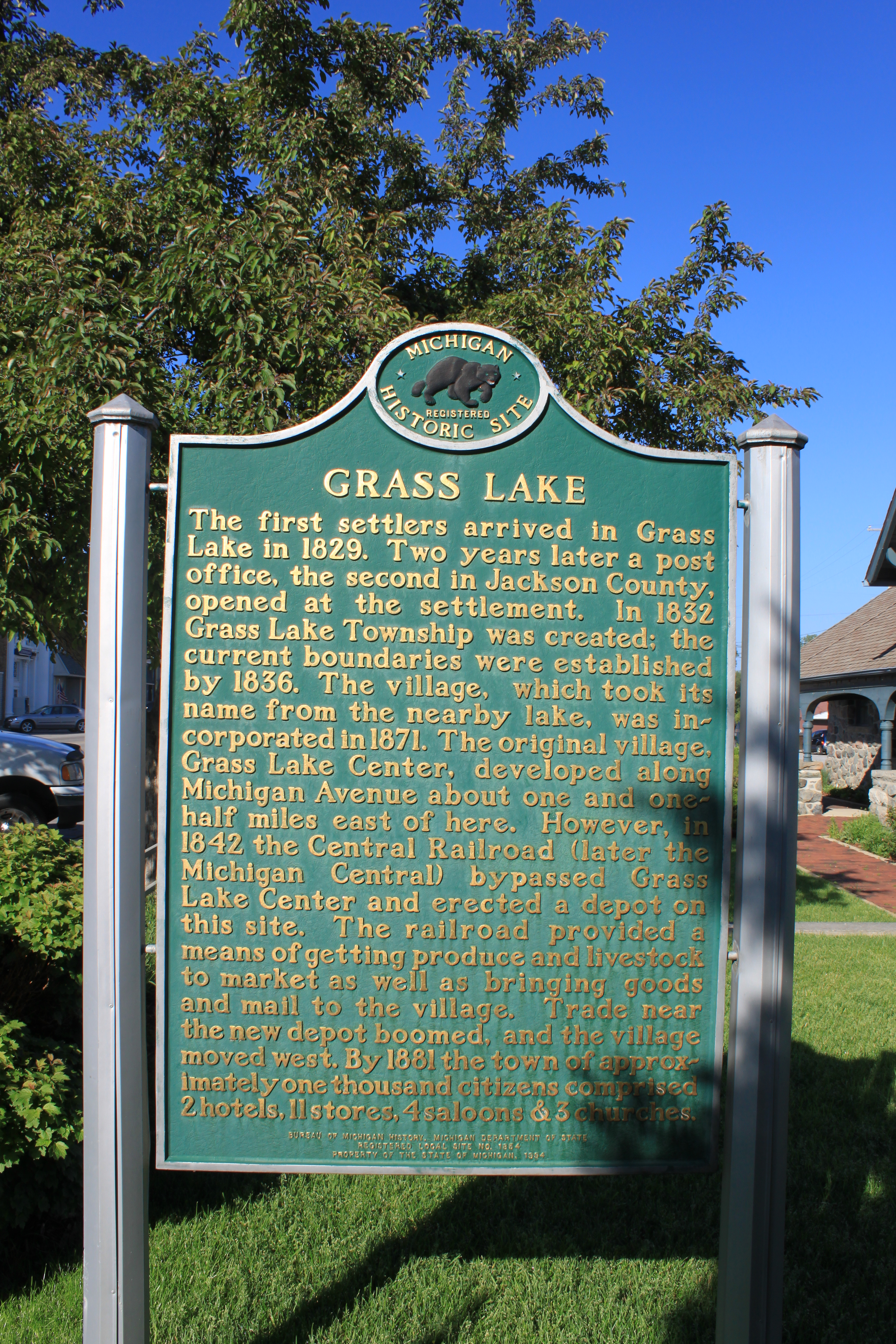
Grass Lake historical marker

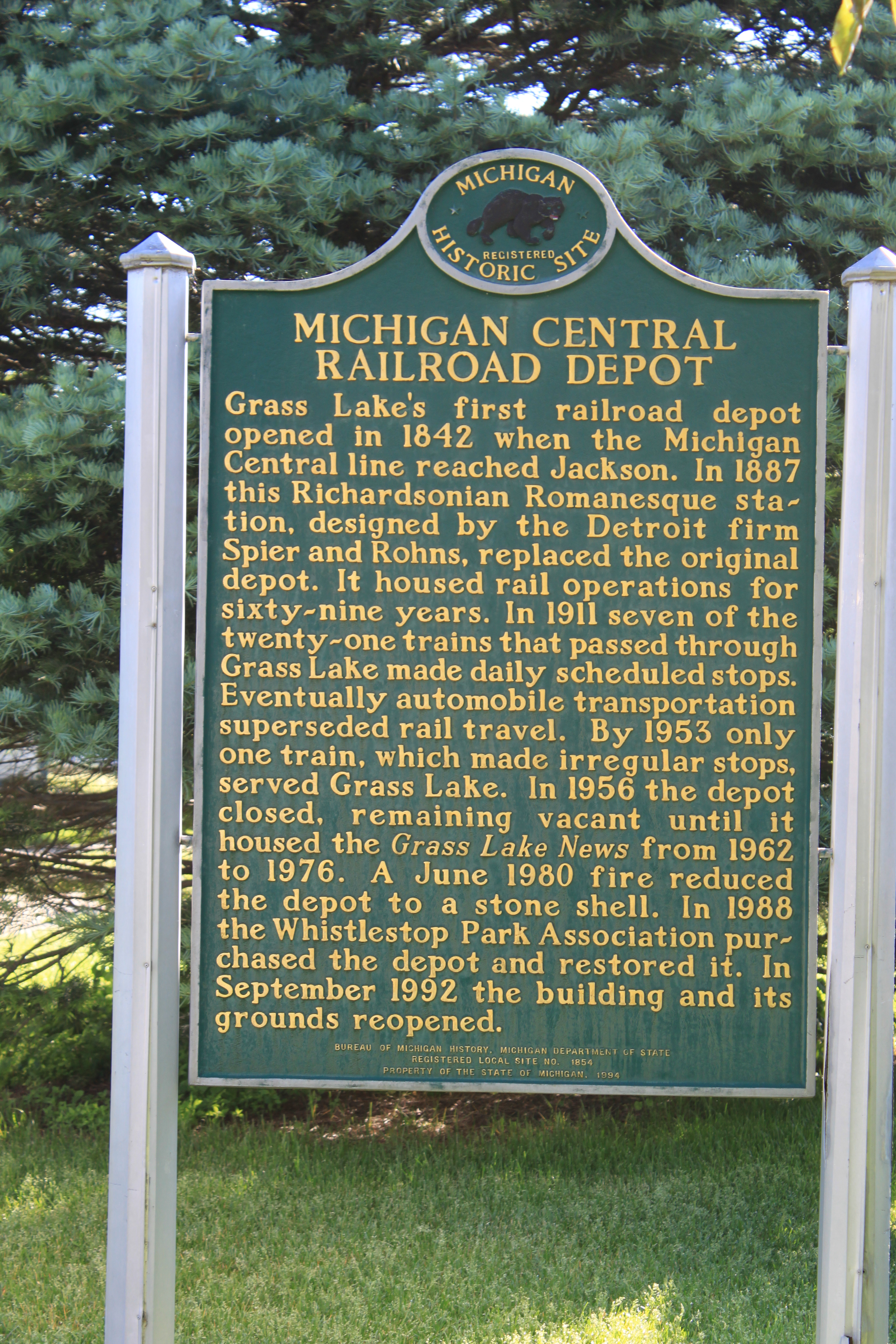
Michigan Central Railroad historical marker
