= Leslie Public Schools =

School district in Michigan, United States

Address
- 4141 Hull Rd Leslie, Ingham, Michigan, 49251; United States

District information
- Grades: PreKindergarten-12
- Established: 1837
- Superintendent: Scott Powers
- Schools: 4
- Budget: $16,633,000 2022-2023 expenditures
- NCES District ID: 2621450

Students and staff
- Students: 1,090 (2024-2025)
- Teachers: 67.38 (on an FTE basis) (2024-2025)
- Staff: 135.43 FTE (2024-2025)
- Student–teacher ratio: 16.18 (2024-2025)

Other information
- Website: www.lesliek12.net

Leslie Public Schools is a public school district in Michigan. In Ingham County, it serves Leslie and parts of the townships of Bunker Hill, Leslie, and Onondaga. In Jackson County, it serves parts of Rives Township and Tompkins Township.

== History ==
Leslie's school district was established in 1837. In a 1925 profile of Leslie, the Jackson Citizen Patriot described the district as having 350 students, with 90 high school students and 75 grade-schoolers attending in a temporary structure on the main school grounds. "The main building contains 10 rooms and, while not modern in all respects, is a fairly good building."

A new school was built in 1928, and a new elementary school was built in 1952. Additions at the high school and elementary school were built in 1956, designed by architect Earl G. Meyer.

A new high school opened in fall 1964, and the 1928 building became a middle school. According to a description of the new high school in the local newspaper, twelve of the sixteen teaching stations were windowless, for reasons of economy. The design was meant to eliminate the "cost of shades to shut-out sunlight or to darken a room for showing films and the expense of heating rooms with large window areas. These factors were considered, as well as eliminating the cost of window installation. All windows in the new building are tinted and require no shades or drapes."

The current high school opened in fall 1997. The 1964 high school building became a middle school in 1999. The 1928 school became a charter school after the district stopped using it in 1999, but was closed in 2005 and demolished in 2023.

== Schools ==
Schools in Leslie Public Schools district
School	Address	Notes
Leslie High School	4141 Hull Road, Leslie	Grades 9-12. Built 1997.
Leslie Middle School	400 Kimball Street, Leslie	Grades 5-8. Built 1964.
Woodworth Elementary	212 Pennsylvania, Leslie	Grades PreK-4.
Ingham Virtual High School	4141 Hull Rd., Leslie	Grades 9-12. Online high school.
Leslie Learning Center	510 Russell St., Leslie	Preschool
