= List of The Dead Files episodes =

The Dead Files is an American documentary paranormal television series, airing on the Travel Channel. Psychic medium Amy Allan performs "walks" through haunted properties, while former NYPD homicide detective Steve DiSchiavi interviews those affected and performs research into the location's history. The more prominent portions of what Amy perceives during her walk are sketched and later revealed during a meeting with Steve, the clients and herself.

On April 21, 2023, it was announced that the fifteenth season will premiere on June 1, 2023, as well as Allan's departure from the series during the season.

As of October 5, 2023, 244 episodes of The Dead Files have aired, concluding the fifteenth season.

== Series overview ==
Season	Episodes	Originally released	
Season	Episodes	First released	Last released
1	8	September 23, 2011	November 11, 2011
2	14	March 9, 2012	July 20, 2012
3	36	August 10, 2012	August 2, 2013
4	15	November 1, 2013	January 31, 2014
5	21	June 12, 2014	January 3, 2015
6	22	April 25, 2015	January 2, 2016
7	19	April 2, 2016	September 17, 2016
8	20	February 4, 2017	September 16, 2017
9	13	February 3, 2018	June 8, 2018
10	13	June 15, 2018	September 7, 2018
11	13	July 11, 2019	October 3, 2019
12	13	December 3, 2019	April 23, 2020
13	13	January 4, 2021	March 15, 2021
14	12	October 23, 2021	April 2, 2022
15	13	June 1, 2023	October 19, 2023

== Episodes ==
=== Season 1 (2011) ===
No. overall	No. in season	Title	Location	Original release date
1	1	"Evil in Erieville"	Private residence, Erieville, New York	September 23, 2011
In the series premiere, physical medium Amy Allan and retired NYPD homicide detective Steve DiSchiavi team up to investigate a paranormal case at a circa 1790 barn and farmhouse in Erieville, New York. Amy and Steve uncover the murderous past hidden within the walls of a rural New York farmhouse. Steve's complex investigation reveals a mother's unspeakable crime, while Amy's harrowing walk-through leads her to a dangerous portal.
2	2	"The Devil Made Me Do It"	Business, Asbury Park, New Jersey	September 30, 2011
Amy and Steve travel to Asbury Park, New Jersey and discover the gruesome secrets of what may be a haunted restaurant. Their discoveries shock the restaurant's owner and shed new light on an evil truth hiding in the basement. Steve finds out that a brutal murder took place there when it was an antique shop in 1997 and interviews the killer who is in prison.
3	3	"Terror In The Shadows"	Private residence, Acampo, California	October 7, 2011
Amy and Steve travel to Acampo, California at the request of the children of an elderly woman who now lives alone in an old farmhouse to investigate the terrifying phantoms have tortured a northern California family for generations. Amy takes a horrifying walk through their home, while Steve investigates accounts of phantoms, possessions and unexplained physical attacks when living there.
4	4	"Death and Dolls"	Private residence, Cramerton, North Carolina	October 14, 2011
Amy and Steve travel to a home in Cramerton, North Carolina that the owner calls her "House of Dolls" to investigate reports of the more than 2,000 dolls within its walls could be possessed by the spirits of the dead who may be contacting their 9-year-old daughter, Salem, who has an interest in war and death. Amy explains to them that they are vessels for the dead and feels threatened by a man in black, while Steve uncovers startling discoveries about a pest house.
5	5	"The White Widow"	Private residence, New Orleans, Louisiana	October 21, 2011
Amy and Steve travel to New Orleans to investigate an urban legend of a Creole woman, a widow named Louisa Clay, who allegedly hanged herself and her dog in the attic in 1888. Her ghost is reportedly seen in a white dress haunting a single mother and her young son in their 1830s era home. Steve hears chilling eyewitness testimonies, while Amy comes face-to-face with the apparition bearing a shocking secret.
6	6	"Hotel Hell"	Business, Ybor City, Florida	October 28, 2011
Amy and Steve travel to the historic Tampa, Florida neighborhood of Ybor City at the request of the owners of the Don Vicente De Ybor Historic Inn to investigate reports of an apparition of a small Hispanic woman seen in Room 305 and in the basement by guests and employees of what was originally a hospital during the organized crime era of the area. Steve's investigation uncovers the inn's morbid history and discovers that José Luis Avellanal was a man who masqueraded as a doctor that may have experimented with the dead and is haunting the location. Amy is pushed to the edge of madness during her "walk".
7	7	"Am I Crazy? (a.k.a. House of the Insane)"	Private residence, Great Falls, Montana	November 4, 2011
Amy and Steve travel to Great Falls, Montana to investigate the Gibson House built in 1890 that belonged to Paris Gibson, the founder of the city. They investigate paranormal reports that the ghost of a murdered woman believed to be his wife, Valeria, who is alleged to haunt a mother and her 6-year-old daughter in the former home where she died. While Steve digs up a scandalous past, Amy is eluded by a spirit who may know the truth behind the horrible secrets buried within this legendary home.
8	8	"Killed By The Klan"	Private residence, Key West, Florida	November 11, 2011
Amy and Steve travel to Key West, Florida to investigate what a woman thinks could be her partner, a treasure hunter who says he sees spirits, bringing home evil spirits into their Key West "shotgun house" (former cigar factory worker home) on Whitehead Street. Amy and Steve uncover a history of unspeakable violent crimes and tell them that the house is associated with a man called "The Islander" (Manual Cabeza) who was tortured and killed there in 1921 by members of the local Ku Klux Klan chapter. Steve hunts down evidence of voodoo sacrifices and rampant racism, while Amy is horrified by visions of disfigured dead.

=== Season 2 (2012) ===
No. overall	No. in season	Title	Location	Original release date
9	1	"Special Investigation: Alcatraz"	Alcatraz Island, San Francisco, California	March 9, 2012
Amy and Steve travel to San Francisco Bay to investigate Alcatraz Island. Steve meets with a man who alleges to have been attacked while on a day tour in Cell 14 on D Block in the former prison by an unknown evil entity when he was a 13-year-old boy 38 years ago. While Steve interviews Bob Davis, Amy takes her "walk" through the same areas visitors say they have had ghostly encounters with former inmates and guards. They investigate disturbing reports and eyewitness accounts of paranormal activity at the legendary prison, including demonic possession as they uncover secrets about the bloody history of America's most iconic penitentiary.
10	2	"Special Investigation: Lizzie Borden House"	Lizzie Borden House, Fall River, Massachusetts	April 20, 2012
Amy and Steve travel to Fall River, Massachusetts to investigate recent reports of attacks and apparitions at the Lizzie Borden House bed and breakfast. Steve interviews the owners, employees and former guests about their experiences. Meanwhile, Amy takes her "walk" of the house and believes to have seen the ghost of Lizzie Borden. Steve finds out more about a possible alibi to the infamous hatchet murders that occurred there on August 4, 1892.
11	3	"Scandal in the South"	Private Residence, Cartersville, Georgia	April 27, 2012
Amy and Steve travel to the deep south to investigate a terrified mother's claims of strange paranormal activity in Cartersville, Georgia as they embark on a journey to unveil the dark truth lurking within the family's historic residence. The woman tells them that she sees apparitions, hears giggling children, a woman crying, has personal belongings go missing and is inappropriately caressed. The owners believe there is an "evil room" in the house with the spirit of an abusive, murderous police chief who allegedly conducted the lynching of African-American men on the back porch during Prohibition until one of them killed him at the residence.
12	4	"Fear at the Family Tree"	Business, Santaquin, Utah	May 4, 2012
Amy and Steve travel to Santaquin, Utah, just south of Provo, to investigate disturbing reports of paranormal activity at a family-owned restaurant that has been an old saloon, a dance hall and a post office in the past. The owner and employees say they are seeing ghosts, hearing strange noises, having electrical problems, and being touched. They believe the ghosts of four children who drowned in flood control channels which ran behind the restaurant in the early 1950s may be the cause of the alleged hauntings. A fearful mother is faced with a harsh decision: hand over a potentially haunted business to her daughter, or walk away entirely.
13	5	"A Watery Grave"	Private residence, Elizabeth City, North Carolina	May 11, 2012
Amy and Steve travel to Elizabeth City, North Carolina to investigate reports of paranormal activity at a historic home where a grad student says that he has been terrorized by a desperate ghost in his childhood home. The young man says he spent his high school years afraid of his own home and continues to worry for his safety now that he's returned to begin his graduate studies. They also reveal the unsolved murder of Nell Cropsey, the former resident who disappeared one night until her body was found by a river near the house in 1901.
14	6	"Final Curtain Call"	Business, Vancouver, Washington	May 18, 2012
Amy and Steve travel to Vancouver, Washington to investigate reports of frightening paranormal activity at the historic Victorian era Slocum House Theater which was the oldest community theater in the area. Amy discovers secrets hiding in the dark corners that include the spirits of children and the ghost of Laura Slocum inhabits the theater, especially when children visitors are present. The Slocum House is the only surviving structure in its former residential neighborhood of the Vancouver historic core. It was moved one block from its original location in 1966 and Steve unearths the location's bloody history.
15	7	"Deadly Attraction"	Private residence, Wichita, Kansas	May 25, 2012
Amy and Steve travel to Wichita, Kansas to investigate claims of paranormal activity in a house where a grandmother is afraid her grandchildren will be harmed by evil spirits. Amy finds many disturbing entities including a prostitute who was killed in a shoot-out and children who were burned in a fire. Steve's investigation reveals the house sits in the middle of what was once the bloody neighborhood of Delano Township where it was a red-light district during the wild west. Their client, Kristen, says she's often felt a supernatural presence around her throughout her life.
16	8	"Pandora's Box"	Private residence, Blackshear, Georgia	June 1, 2012
Amy and Steve travel to Blackshear, Georgia to investigate reports of bizarre paranormal activity at a family's home that includes kitchen cabinets being ripped from the hinges, objects knocked off of tables and walls and dishes being broken by an entity named Pearl Taylor. As Steve investigates Pearl he discovers that she is a 16-year-old girl who was killed by a fire in the house when on August 27, 1910, she drops a kerosene lantern and it explodes onto her and dies in painful agony the next day. She now communicates with the child of the current owners who has Downs Syndrome and whose parents fear that Pearl may be a dangerous influence on their daughter and want to put a stop to it. Amy finds other entities living in the attic who are terrorizing any and all who live in the home along with many children and others as Steve discovers another deadly tragedy.
17	9	"Surrounded"	Private residence, Cedar Park, Texas	June 8, 2012
Amy and Steve travel to the Austin, Texas suburb of Cedar Park to investigate strange paranormal sightings at an old homestead outside of the city where the current residents are terrified in their rental home after seeing apparitions in the surrounding trees and shadow people around the home and fields. Amy reveals that the sightings of hooded figures in long white robes are believed to be the spirits of Ku Klux Klan members. Steve's investigation uncovers that in the 1870s Samuel Chelton Inman who was a deacon of the New Hope First Baptist Church killed and buried a man on the property.
18	10	"Blood and Gold"	Business, Virginia City, Nevada	June 15, 2012
Amy and Steve travel to Virginia City, Nevada to investigate reports of paranormal activity at Mackay Mansion Museum, a miners museum in an old Nevada mining town. Steve investigates the history of the murder of Julia Bulette, a famous prostitute who was killed in her home on January 20, 1867, and the ghost of Louise Mackay at the mansion. Amy encounters several disturbing entities including John Millain, the French drifter and serial killer who murdered Julia and was hung for it, still residing and roaming there along with a young playful girl believed to be John William Mackay's step-daughter.
19	11	"A Widow's Rage"	Private residence, Uriah, Alabama	June 22, 2012
Amy and Steve travel to Uriah, Alabama to investigate reports of paranormal encounters in an old Civil War-era antebellum mansion plantation house where the owner thinks her life is in danger from being physically attacked by an evil spirit of a man who also resides there who has attempted a demonic possession of her so he can kill the residents. Steve's investigation reveals that construction began on the home in the late 1850s by Dr. William (Doc) King, but was never entirely finished at its original site at Packard’s Bend due to the outbreak of the Civil War. During the mid-1960s new owners moved it from Packard’s Bend on the Alabama River in Clark County to its current location in Uriah. Steve also discovers that most of the King family members died of yellow fever in the mansion. Amy discovers that one of the King girls wants to kill the lady of the house.
20	12	"Prison of Shadows (a.k.a. Death Sentence)"	Penitentiary, Santa Fe, New Mexico	June 29, 2012
Amy and Steve travel to Santa Fe, New Mexico to investigate the abandoned and infamous Old New Mexico State Penitentiary where the worst prison riot in American history (New Mexico State Penitentiary riot) took place on February 2–3, 1980. Steve interviews an actress who filmed a movie there who was locked in a cell by a shadow man that may have followed her home and a former inmate who was there during the riot. Amy meets a murderous evil spirit she calls the "Shadow Devil" and also does a "walk" at the actress's residence. Steve's investigation validates Amy seeing a battle between enslaved Pueblo Indians and their Spanish captors which is known as the Pueblo Revolt that took place across the region during August 11–21, 1680. This episode Amy breaks the rules and meets Steve prior to the reveal (about 21:30 mark)
21	13	"Starvation Heights"	Private residences, Olalla, Washington	July 6, 2012
Amy and Steve travel to Olalla, Washington to investigate reports of paranormal activity from a frightened teenager who believes his family could be in danger in their newly built home after he may have opened up a portal for evil spirits when he and his friends performed at least 17 séances at their former residence next door. Steve and Amy say that Dr. Linda Burfield Hazzard had lived there a century ago when the area was known as "Starvation Heights" due to a cruel fasting treatment she advocated, used on her patients and herself. She was imprisoned by the state of Washington for a number of deaths resulting from this at a sanatorium she operated there in the early 20th century and died in 1938 while attempting a fasting cure on herself.
22	14	"Arctic Wrath"	Business, Central, Alaska	July 20, 2012
Amy and Steve travel to Central, Alaska, a remote village 137 miles northeast of Fairbanks, to investigate the Circle Hot Springs Resort. The caretaker and his daughters say that they see a three-headed apparition with a monkey head and feathers they believe to be a shapeshifter that hates women. Steve's relentless investigation digs up information about a fatal helicopter crash involving a newlywed bride that took place near the property. Amy encounters several entities along with the ghosts of the original owner and his German wife who are buried in the cemetery behind the hotel. Note: closed – up for sale by owner

=== Season 3 (2012–13) ===
No. overall	No. in season	Title	Location	Original release date
0	0	"The Lost Episode"	Bed and breakfast, Denver, Colorado	October 6, 2012
This is a webisode on the official Travel Channel website, that shows Amy, Steve, and Matt's first investigation together, back in 2009.
23	1	"Fatal Attachment"	Business, Huntington, West Virginia	August 10, 2012
Steve and Amy investigate reports of ghostly apparitions at a dental office in Huntington, West Virginia. While Steve uncovers evidence of a mysterious death, Amy says she encounters spirits.
24	2	"A Banshee's Cry"	Smalley's Inn, Carmel, New York	August 17, 2012
Steve and Amy investigate reports of violent paranormal activity at Smalley’s Inn & Restaurant in upstate New York. While Steve investigates, Amy claims to confront aggressive entities that desperately want her to leave.
25	3	"Revisited: Deadly Attraction & Fear of the Family Tree"	Private residence, Wichita, Kansas; Leslie's Family Tree Restaurant, Santaquin, Utah	August 24, 2012
Amy and Steve return to Wichita where a woman claimed her house was haunted. Then they travel to a family restaurant claimed to be haunted in Santaquin to find out if the owners followed Amy's advice.
26	4	"Revisited: Blood and Gold & Pandoras Box"	Mackay Mansion, Virginia City, Nevada; Private residence, Blackshear, Georgia	October 5, 2012
Amy and Steve revisit Mackay Mansion, a miners museum in an old mining town where they say the ghost of former owner Louise Mackay resides and Julia Bulette, a famous prostitute was murdered. Then they revisit a 100-year-old house in Georgia that they feel has a high amount of paranormal activity.
27	5	"Revisited: A Widow's Rage & Death Sentence"	Private residence, Uriah, Alabama; New Mexico State Penitentiary, Santa Fe, New Mexico	October 12, 2012
Amy and Steve revisit an old Civil War-era plantation house in Alabama where members of the King family died of yellow fever in the house. Next they revisit New Mexico State Penitentiary where a spirit called the "Shadow Devil" is said to reside.
28	6	"Revisited: Surrounded & Hotel Hell"	Private residence, Cedar Park, Texas; Don Vicente De Ybor Historic Inn, Ybor City, Florida	October 19, 2012
Amy and Steve revisit a homestead in Texas where a family claims to have sighted figures in long hooded white robes they believe to be the KKK. Next, they revisit the Don Vicente De Ybor Historic Inn where the ghost of an elderly Hispanic woman believed to be a nurse when the hotel was a hospital is allegedly seen in the basement.
29	7	"Revisited: Final Curtain Call & The Devil Made Me Do It"	Slocum House Theater, Vancouver, Washington; Plan B Restaurant, Asbury Park, New Jersey	October 26, 2012
Amy and Steve revisit the Slocum House Theater where Esther Slocum, the original owner is said to haunt this community theater. Next, they revisit Plan B Restaurant where a brutal murder occurred that is alleged to result in the basement being haunted by a demon.
30	8	"Blood on the Tracks"	Private residence, Garrett, Indiana	November 2, 2012
Steve and Amy investigate reported paranormal activity at a newlywed couple's haunted house in the old railroad town of Garrett. Through research Steve learns that the previous owner Ralph died from a stroke in the house. Also Ed Hammers, a railroad brakeman who bought the house in 1896 was killed by a 150-ton train in August 1918 and had his bodily remains in the home for his wake. Amy claims to encounter Ralph in the basement and make contact with a depressed woman believed to be Hammers first wife Susan who battled his second wife Carrie in court over their husband's estate.
31	9	"The Soul Collector"	Private residence, Parkersburg, West Virginia	November 30, 2012
Steve and Amy investigate reports of paranormal activity from a mother and her eight children who say they are being terrorized by paranormal activity in their West Virginia home. Through research, Steve uncovers the property's history: on March 19, 1909, a young couple was killed when two massive water tanks collapsed and flooded the town. Meanwhile, Amy says she has encountered the ghosts of a teenage boy and a man in a black coat, believed to be Civil War General John Jay Jackson Sr., one of Parkersburg's founding fathers who owned the property.
32	10	"The House of Death"	Business, Clinton, North Carolina	December 7, 2012
Amy and Steve investigate reports of paranormal activity from volunteers at an arts center house in Clinton who fear that the place is haunted by a previous director named Dr. Victor Small who died of a heart attack in a freak snowstorm on February 3, 1971. Through research, Steve discovers evidence of the former owner Dr. Leeman Matthews who slit his throat in the bath tub. Meanwhile, Amy says she becomes ill from the spirit of the original owner Abraham Hobbs, a Confederate soldier who got wounded at the Battle of Antietam and a gentleman farmer.
33	11	"Blood in the Bordello"	Business, Columbus, Ohio	December 14, 2012
Steve and Amy investigate a tavern established in 1831 after hearing reports that an evil entity has attacked the owner's wife and is scaring employees. Through research Steve learns that the area was a Hopwell Indian burial mound. In the 1820s, the settlers dug it all up and took the clay and bones to ground up into bricks. The tavern was built to accommodate the courthouse and it later became a bordello. Frances Miller, a prostitute shot and killed a young man named Paulus Reprecht at this location on March 31, 1859. Meanwhile, Amy claims to encounter a shadow man up in the attic she believes to be the judge, Mayor Lorenzo English who presided over Miller's case. English was the 20th mayor of Columbus, Ohio.
34	12	"Family Curse"	Private residence, Belvidere, Illinois	December 21, 2012
Amy and Steve investigate reports of paranormal activity from a mother and son who say they were touched by a ghost in their home. Steve uncovers a history of deaths of original owners. Amy claims to meet a child-like demonic entity in the barn that she believes changes into an elemental that can possess the living.
35	13	"Deadly Gift"	Private residence/business, Wichita, Kansas	December 28, 2012
Amy and Steve investigate reports of paranormal activity from a couple who fear that they are in danger from spirits at their beauty salon and auto body shop. Steve learns that the land changed hands 30 times in the last 80 years and a biker named Mark committed suicide nearby. Also Helen Hillman who moved into the house in 1947 with her husband William is believed to be the victim of a suspicious death when she fell down the stairs. Meanwhile, Amy claims to encounter the spirits of Helen in the attic and an angry man she calls the "greaser guy".
36	14	"Burned Alive"	Business, Pioneer Square, Seattle, Washington	January 4, 2013
Amy and Steve visit what is said to be Seattle's oldest restaurant (est. 1890) that the owner believes is haunted by spirits that want to cause her harm. Steve learns that on January 18, 1882, a lynch mob strung up two men who killed businessman George Reynolds and hanged an innocent man named Payne. The original structure was burned to the ground during the Great Seattle Fire on June 6, 1889, where many perished. Then-owner John Ossner turned the basement saloon into a gambling den and the hotel into a brothel. In 1898, F.X. Schreiner took over but his wife Mary, a devote Catholic opposed it and died from tuberculosis in 1905. Amy says she encounters Mary's ghost and a wrestler named Otto Hink, a bartender who died of syphilis in 1957.
37	15	"Tormented"	Private residence, Westminster, Colorado	January 25, 2013
Amy and Steve investigate reports of paranormal activity from a single mother whose two children are afraid to be in her house alone. Through research, Steve learns that her property was originally owned by a farmer who came here in 1869 to start Church Farm to bring water to the town. During the irrigation process in 1936, a man by the name of John Shannon fell and drowned in a ditch after he tried to smother his newborn baby. He also uncovers evidence of a century-old murder in 1912 when a young bride named Gertrude Weaver who lived on the land was fatality shot while on her honeymoon. Meanwhile Amy believes that a female entity called Gertrude and a poltergeist called "The Tormentor" poses a threat to the family.
38	16	"Never Alone"	Private residence, Forester, Michigan	February 1, 2013
Steve and Amy investigate reports of paranormal activity from a mother who says her house is haunted by a ghost. Steve uncovers fires in the home that happened in 1871 and 1881 where people died. He also finds out a local legend that 15-year-old Minnie Quay committed suicide by drowning in the lake. Meanwhile, Amy says she encounters a shadow figure of a man a crying and a woman holding a stillborn baby that she believes are previous owners Harrison Cooper and his daughter Emma Jay who miscarried her child in 1903.
39	17	"Forgotten"	Private home, Bloomington, Illinois	February 8, 2013
Steve and Amy investigate reports of paranormal activity from a woman who tells them that she is living in fear in her home because ghosts are targeting her special needs son. Steve says there were land disputes and burials from a poor farm on the property. In 1836, Steve says it was a 350-acre farm owned by William King who first came here with his wife and four children. King's first wife Amelia died at 29 during childbirth along with his two boys. King himself died on the farm at the age of 41. His son George died when he accidentally shot himself in the chest in the 1870s after the deed to the farm went to his younger brother. Meanwhile, Amy says she encounters dead people acting strangely and a man with an axe who created a black mass she calls "The Doll".
40	18	"Betrayed"	Private home, Egg Harbor, New Jersey	March 8, 2013
Steve and Amy investigate a family in Southern New Jersey who believes their house is haunted by an evil entity. Through research, Steve says he discovers evidence that in the late 1800s, a nearby "health spa" that was really a sanatorium was run by an allegedly insane doctor named Dr. Smith who believed he found the fountain of youth. Steve also learns about a German immigrant, Louis Roesch who came to town in the 1860s and was betrayed by his people because there was no civilization here. Meanwhile, Amy says she encounters a monstrous Shadowman in the basement who attempts to harm the living including herself. Also Amy claims to come into contact with the previous owner, Louis Brunk who died in the home and two of the six children of the Roesch family.
41	19	"The Beast"	Private residence, Browns Summit, North Carolina	March 15, 2013
Steve and Amy investigate a family who say they are getting sick in their family home and uncover what they feel is attacking their daughter with special needs. During the investigation, Steve uncovers past evidence of a fatal train disaster in 1907 caused by a flagman that occurred on the property which was the Rudd farm. The property history allegedly includes two men who threw dynamite inside a Black Methodist Church along with 4 men from the KKK who burned down the school next to it. Meanwhile, Amy says she confronts a beastly, dog-like apparition that she fears can kill anyone who gets in its way and an old man who was beating an 8-year-old boy named Elmer who once lived here.
42	20	"Revisited: Fatal Attachment & Blood on the Tracks"	Business, Huntington, West Virginia; Private residence, Garrett, Indiana	March 29, 2013
Amy and Steve share updates on their follow-up investigations when they revisit a dentist's office in rural Indiana that scared away patients and the staff. Next, they revisit a family home where a couple believes there is something demonic in their basement.
43	21	"Deadly Grounds"	Private home, Wabash, Indiana	April 5, 2013
Steve and Amy investigate a mother who believes her home is infested with monsters that are targeting her three children. Steve learns that Ed and Maggie Williams were the first white settlers to live on the property. Ed died of pneumonia and six weeks later his wife died of heart disease leaving six children. He discovers that the property belonged to the Miami tribe who were forcefully shipped off to Kansas. Amy encounters a white mist believed to Maggie's spirit spilling out emotions of depression especially on the living and always watching the family. According to Amy, seven shallow graves outside are evidence of a murder here in 1854 when the French family took in the Hubbards, a couple who beat them and their five children to death with hammers. John Hubbard went to jail for the murder of railman Edward Boyle who was beaten to death.
44	22	"Evil Underground"	Private residence, Rock Island, Illinois	April 12, 2013
Steve and Amy investigate the family home of a mother and her 4-year-old daughter who say they are being terrorized by evil spirits inside their house. Through research, Steve reveals that there was a Native American tribe called the Sauk Nation that inhabited the land. One of them named Keokuk appeased the white settlers by selling out his whole nation and had them displaced. Meanwhile, Amy says she encounters a man dressed in black she believes to be John Looney, a ruthless gangster and convicted murderer who was involved in prostitution, gambling and bootlegging and owned the property in the 1920s possibly to bury his victims. Also Amy says she sees the Sauk people in the rooms as well as naked dead people down in the basement who want to destroy the house.
45	23	"Revisited: The Soul Collector & Deadly Gift"	Private residence, Parkersburg, West Virginia; Private residence, Wichita, Kansas	April 26, 2013
Amy and Steve revisit a West Virginia house where a mother and her eight children say they are being terrorized by hauntings in their home. Next, they return to a home in Wichita where a couple claim to be victimized by evil entities in their place of business at their beauty salon and auto body shop.
46	24	"Possessed"	Private residence, Watervliet, Michigan	May 3, 2013
Steve and Amy receive a call from a woman who believes if they don't help her then her house will "kill her" because her health seriously declined and she is being scratched and burned by an unseen force. Steve learns the property was developed in the early 1830s by Isaac Swain who owned the largest lumber mill in the county. Swain and his family had three children who died suddenly. Their second daughter, Louisa had an accident when she fell and hit her head so hard that she became mentally disabled and was left alone after her family died. Also his wife Vallonia died from tuberculosis-like symptoms. Amy says she sees a woman she believes to Saddie Smith who moved here in 1914 and died four years later of Spanish influenza, having her wake in the house. She also allegedly encounters an angry old man in the basement she thinks may be Saddie's father.
47	25	"Spellbound"	Private residence, Buchanan, Virginia	May 10, 2013
Steve and Amy investigate a family who fears the house which was in their family since the 1930s is haunted and something on their property is attacking them and making them sick. Through research, Steve uncovers evidence that the property was once a slave plantation where slaves including children had a hard life raising tobacco. Meanwhile, Amy says she senses two sisters who are ghosts who she believes to be the wives (Helen and Elizabeth) of Starky Robinson who bought the house in 1870 and are causing ill will towards the family. She also says she encounters the plantation owner Nicholas Burks who had five mulatto children with a slave named Louisa whose children ended up victim of human trafficking. According to Amy, she was a hoodoo practitioner who wants to demolish the house.
48	26	"Death Valley"	Business, Death Valley Junction, California	May 17, 2013
Steve and Amy travel to desert of Death Valley to investigate the paranormal claims that the Amargosa Opera House and Hotel is overrun by ghostly guests which is a problem for the manager who fears this could put him out of business. Through research, Steve learns about a former road agent turned janitor named Thomas Blower who hanged himself in the older part of the hotel known as "Spooky Hollow" and a man who was found dead in the sewer plant across the street. Meanwhile, Amy says she encounters several ghosts, including sick men who could be borax miners and a short-heavy woman she believes to be "Shotgun Kitty", a brothel and bar owner who ran the town and doesn't like how this place is being run. She also claims to meet a spirit named Blower.
49	27	"Bloodlust"	Business, Buffalo, Wyoming	May 24, 2013
Steve and Amy travel to the Occidental Hotel (est. 1880) and meet the owner of who believes paranormal experiences have frightened away her employees and guests. Steve learns that the hotel was right in the middle of The Johnson County War which was the biggest event in the town's history. In 1892, homesteaders settled onto cattle ranchers land. The Wyoming Stock Growers Association hired 50 gunmen known as the "Invaders" to clear them out. They met at the hotel saloon and came to arms with the men at a nearby ranch. It cumulated in a three-day standoff with the cavalry riding in. When the hotel was a courthouse in 1884, the cook Jacob Schmerer was murdered by Bill Booth over venison meat. At that trial he confessed to murdering his wife and 2 children and 12 other people and was hanged behind the hotel. Amy says she saw a group of men in uniform who resented the mission they were sent to complete, and a negative spirit she believes to be the original owner Fred Waegele who was poisoned by his daughter-in-law after raping her.
50	28	"Hotel Nowhere"	Wolfe Manor (official name undisclosed), Clovis, California	May 31, 2013
Steve and Amy investigate a mansion that was formerly a mental hospital after the owner who bought the home in hopes of turning it into a hotel believes the paranormal activity is out of control and not safe. Through research Steve learns that the building was originally a tuberculosis sanitarium run by a married couple named Lee and Gladys Brashears from 1942 to 1973 when hospital administrator Carl Lamoreaux took over. He took in mentally ill patients until 1985 when he died in the facility. Meanwhile Amy says she encounters what she believes to be sick people seen throwing up in the halls and crawling on the walls wanting to harm the living. She claims to meet the ghost of the original owner of the mansion, Tony Andrews who built the place for his wife in 1922. He lived beyond his means and his house got foreclosed on in 1927 and had to move into a small shack on the property and died at an early age. She also says she meets the Brashears who she says believe they did a good job running the place. Any also claims to see bodies in the basement from the TB epidemic.
51	29	"Revisited: Family Curse and The House of Death"	Residence, Belvidere, Illinois; Business, Clinton, North Carolina	June 7, 2013
Amy and Steve revisit a home where a child-like demonic entity is said to change into an elemental that can possess the living. Next, they return to a Fine Arts Center that is inhabited by the ghosts of a gentleman farmer, a Confederate soldier and two Doctors, one that died in a freak snow storm and the other that slit his throat in the bath tub.
52	30	"Violated"	Private residence, Fort Wayne, Indiana	June 14, 2013
Steve and Amy investigate claims of paranormal activity inside a family home with a deadly past. Steve learns about a murder that took place in December of 1996. The victim, Alberto Lopez, 25, had a live-in girlfriend, 43-year-old Lucy Rivera. They got into an argument and she stabbed him with a knife in the back and he died in the kitchen. Steve also discovers that the property belonged to the prominent Olds family who used the land as a business investment in the late 1800s. Henry G. Olds inherited the property in 1876 and had many mercantile interests. When he died in 1902 at the age of 62 from a series of strokes, his wife Caroline took over. There were lawsuits brought against them when a worker fell and was killed inside their wagon factory. His widow sued the company for unsafe working conditions for $10,000. The family took more hits to their wallet with another accident at their coal factory in 1913 and a fire burned down their glove factory in 1920. Amy claims to come into contact with an abusive dark figure that she says sexually assaults the owner's daughter. She also says she encountered a distraught young man she believes to be Alberto and finds antique guns with "residual energy" that drains her own energy.
53	31	"Battlefield"	Private Home, Flint, Michigan	June 21, 2013
Steve and Amy travel to Flint, one of the most violent cities in the country to help a frightened mother in her haunted house. Steve learns that a little girl named Loretta Eschenweck died inside the home in 1936 when she fell inside a hot water laundry tub. Tracing back the history of the property, Steve discovers that the land belonged to the Saginaw Chippewa tribe who were allied with the British coming from Canada to fight the Americans in the War of 1812. They would capture American soldiers and ransom them back to white representatives for money. After the war, the Indians are left high and dry and had to sell their land to the United States. They relied on fur trader, Jacob Smith who the government paid to influence them to sign the Treaty of 1819. Smith secures their land by naming his children Chippewa names into the treaty language. Their client's property is called "Nondashemau" after Smith's youngest daughter Maria Stockton. Amy says she sees a "demonic creature" that is able to change shape and a young girl called "The Babysitter" she believes to be Loretta.
54	32	"Lethal Waters"	Business, Cambridge Springs, Pennsylvania	June 28, 2013
Steve and Amy investigate paranormal claims at a haunted hotel called the Riverside Inn where the activity has gotten so bad that the owner says her employees and guests are scared to work and stay there. Through research, Steve learns that the property was acquired by Dr. John H. Gray in 1859 who went out looking for oil and discovered a spring instead and bottled mineral water in the basement. He started prescribing it to the locals, advertising it as "Gray Mineral Water" and made this place into a wellness sanitarium which was anything but since several people died from too much magnesium in the water. Meanwhile, Amy says she encounters Dr. Gray as a younger man, sees many of his sick patients, and meets two boys who drowned in the French Creek in 1979 who like to manipulate electrical energy. She also claims to see a scene of a man killing a woman she believes to be Doris Hatch who was murdered in the summer of 1953 by her boss and love interest William Turner.
55	33	"Tortured Souls"	Private residence, Manchester, Connecticut	July 12, 2013
Steve and Amy help an ordained minister who believes there is evil in his home by a black mass. Steve learns the property originally belonged to farmer James Lanfear who lived here with his wife Mary who died of tuberculosis when she was 25 in 1851, leaving their two girls. Five months later, James remarried to a woman named Harriet Sparks and their children (two boys) died at childbirth. In 1860, they were charged with child abuse when they burned his girls with a hot iron and it went to trial but they were acquitted. In 1881, Irish immigrant Thomas Coleman bought the land losing his infant son and wife. After, he married his first cousin against the churches wishes and his father disowned him. Amy encounters an angry man in the basement who is believed to be Thomas' oldest son Edward, a fireman who died from kidney failure at the age of 43. She meets an older man that was formerly a police officer known for his bad temper who also happened to be the minister's wife's father. Also she thinks James Lanfear who appears as a dark figure wants to harm the minister's daughter.
56	34	"Revisited: Forgotten and Burned Alive"	Private residence, Bloomington, Illinois; Merchants Café, Pioneer Square, Seattle, Washington	July 19, 2013
Amy and Steve revisit a home that they believe is haunted by an axeman and an entity he controls called "The Doll", as well as numerous other entities believed to have previously lived on the land when it was a Poor Farm. The mother of the current family initially called The Dead Files team because she claimed her disabled son was being harassed by paranormal activity. Next, Amy and Steve return to what is apparently Seattle's oldest restaurant. A former saloon and brothel, one of the entities believed to be residing there is bar manager and former wrestler Otto Hink. The original building was a hotel that burned down during the Great Seattle Fire.
57	35	"Revisited: Betrayed and A Banshee's Cry"	Private residence, Egg Harbor, New Jersey; Smalley's Inn, Carmel, New York	July 26, 2013
58	36	"Revisited: Evil Underground and Killed by the Klan"	Private residence, Rock Island, Illinois; Shotgun House, Key West, Florida	August 2, 2013

=== Season 4 (2013–14) ===
No. overall	No. in season	Title	Location	Original release date
59	1	"LIVE Question and Answer Special"	Private Residence	November 1, 2013
Physical medium Amy Allan and retired NYPD homicide detective Steve DiSchiavi answer questions from viewers and fans during a LIVE special event episode to kick off their third season on the Travel Channel.
60	2	"Plagued"	Private home, Cressona, Pennsylvania	November 1, 2013
Steve and Amy help out a retired military couple. They believe that the house is stalked by John Cresson, the railroader who founded the town. Steve learns that Cresson was a ruthless businessman who was not above selling out his own workers. Amy also states that Cresson dislikes children. Also, present in the home are the victims of the Spanish flu, of a railroad accident which killed six men, and one of the clients' mothers, who has replaced Death itself.
61	3	"Evil Within"	Private home, St. Clair Shores, Michigan	November 8, 2013
Steve and Amy travel to St. Clair Shores, MI, to help a frightened family who say they are terrorized by violent, invisible forces. While Steve unearths the previous property owners’ devastating secrets, Amy encounters what she believes are several disturbing entities, including a serpent-like creature that stalks the living.
62	4	"Revisited: Battlefield & Violated"	Private home, St. Clair Shores, Michigan	November 15, 2013
63	5	"Forever Scarred"	Private home, Chicago, Illinois	November 22, 2013
In this powerfully emotional episode of The Dead Files, retired NYPD homicide detective Steve DiSchiavi and physical medium Amy Allan investigate a Chicago home where a young mother seems to be suffering from horrifying recurring nightmares.
64	6	"The Axe Murder House"	Private home, Villisca, Iowa	November 23, 2013
Steve and Amy investigate startling new claims of paranormal activity at an infamous murder site in Villisca, IA. But after violent unexplained encounters at the property, Steve and Amy’s client worries that living next door to the notorious Axe Murder House may have put his family in danger.
65	7	"Dead End"	Private home, Neosho, Missouri	December 6, 2013
Steve and Amy investigate terrifying paranormal activity at a police officer's home in Neosho, MO. As Steve uncovers evidence of a brutal homicide, Amy faces her own fears when she encounters what she believes is a powerful shadow person with deadly plans for the living.
66	8	"The Devil's Bidding"	Private home, Williamsport, Pennsylvania	December 13, 2013
Steve and Amy travel to Williamsport, PA, to investigate a home tormented by a devil. As Steve discovers the property was once the site of a historic massacre, Amy faces off against what she believes is an evil entity that she fears has been ruining lives for generations.
67	9	"Summoning Souls"	Private home, Starks, Maine	December 20, 2013
In Starks, ME, Steve unearths a property’s dark past when he discovers that the nearby land was once a desecrated cemetery. Meanwhile, Amy confronts what she believes are several terrifying spirits, including a legion of the dead, determined to destroy the lives of unsuspecting victims.
68	10	"Invaded"	Catfish Plantation (restaurant), Waxahachie, Texas	December 27, 2013
Steve and Amy claim a disturbed entity overwhelms them as they investigate violent paranormal activity at a family-owned restaurant located in a Victorian house built in 1895 House in Waxahachie, TX.
69	11	"House of Horrors"	St. Albans Sanatorium, Radford, Virginia	January 3, 2014
Amy and Steve travel to Radford, VA, to investigate reports of frightening paranormal activity at the eerie St. Albans Sanatorium. Steve’s fact-finding mission reveals the hospital’s horrific past, while Amy encounters what she believes are numerous powerful spirits, including a dangerous entity with the power to possess the living.
70	12	"Ghosts of Deadwood"	Fairmont Hotel and Casino, Deadwood, South Dakota	January 10, 2014
When violent paranormal activity plagues the owner and staff of the historic Fairmont Hotel and Casino in legendary Deadwood, Steve and Amy step in to investigate. Through research Steve finds out that famous lawman Wild Bill Hickok was murdered by Jack McCall right next door at a saloon while playing poker. And also an ex-police officer and former middleweight boxing champ John Gorham was gun downed by the local police chief right in front of the hotel in 1949. Meanwhile, Amy says she is surrounded by spirits who refer to this place as the "City of the Dead".
71	13	"Master of the Damned"	Private home, Potsdam, New York	January 17, 2014
Steve finds evidence of a brutal bar fight that left a man dead in the street, while Amy senses a dominant entity that commands other dead people to terrorize the living.
72	14	"Innocent Blood"	Private home, Rome, New York	January 24, 2014
When terrifying paranormal activity targets the children of a Rome, NY, family, Steve and Amy step in to investigate. Steve discovers the property has a distressing connection to a bloody Revolutionary War ambush while Amy believes she encounters a vicious entity that preys on children.
73	15	"Dark Inheritance"	Private home, Winthrop, Massachusetts	January 31, 2014
Steve and Amy investigate a frightened family's claims of violent paranormal encounters inside their home in Winthrop, MA. While Steve discovers the property’s violent past, Amy claims to confront a vengeful, disfigured entity that wreaks havoc on the living.

=== Season 5 (2014–15) ===
No. overall	No. in season	Title	Location	Original release date
74	1	"Revisited: Deadly Grounds and Blood in the Bordello"	TBA	July 5, 2014
75	2	"The Aftermath"	Private home Florida City, Florida	July 12, 2014
Steve and Amy respond to a family's desperate call for help. During the investigation it is revealed that the family's residence was ravaged in a hurricane in the 1990s, even more disturbing is the number of entities sAny believes she has seen during her walk through the home.
76	3	"Fractured"	Private home, St. Louis, Missouri	July 19, 2014
Steve and Amy are called to a home where they believe violent paranormal activity has been taking place. Steve's investigation leads him to learn of those who called the property home once before, including a business tycoon whom tragedy had repeatedly fallen on. Amy's walk reveals what she believes are several children-like entities in the home, possibly demonic in origin who intend to harm the living as well as an entity capable of manipulating the living.
77	4	"Assaulted"	Private home, Hanover, Pennsylvania	July 26, 2014
A family is reporting violent encounters with what they believe is an unseen being in their home. During the investigation Steve learns of a man who lived on the property that was eventually institutionalized. Meanwhile, Amy comes across a grotesque entity that she believes might be causing most of the alleged paranormal activity within the home.
78	5	"Demon War"	Private home, Toledo, Ohio	August 2, 2014
Amy and Steve try to help a family in Ohio who they believe are experiencing disturbing activity in their home, Amy's walk reveals what she believes are several entities roaming about in the home, all locked in a struggle for control, and one in particular that wants the living to leave the home.
79	6	"Satan's Revenge"	Private home, Leslie, Michigan	August 9, 2014
Amy and Steve head to Michigan to assist a family who they believe are being terrorized by an evil force. Steve's investigation leads him to previous owners of the home, including an adulterer and a man who suffered a mental breakdown. Amy's walk leads to the discovery of an angry man with a grudge against the family and what she believes is a shadow entity she refers to as a demon.
80	7	"The Dark One"	Private home, Abilene, Texas	August 16, 2014
Amy and Steve look into paranormal claims of an Air Force veteran whose home has become a battlefield. Records of the home shows it was the scene of violence and tragedies over the years, and the investigation reveals what they believe are dead people draining energy from the living along with an entity so dark the utterance of its name places the living in danger.
81	8	"Double Jeopardy"	Glenn Tavern Inn, Santa Paula, California	August 23, 2014
Amy and Steve investigate a hotel that seems to be alive, forcing the owner to stay and her family to fall apart. The investigation revealing the hotel was the site of murder and other disasters during the time it operated.
82	9	"Feeding Grounds"	Private home, Sumpter, Oregon	August 30, 2014
Amy and Steve assist a family-owned bed and breakfast who say they are experiencing bizarre occurrences in their home. The investigation reveals Sumpter's dark history, its past as a mining town, and a miner who murdered his family. Amy reveals what she believes are five female entities who are able to drain energy from the living and a male entity that comes into conflict with the other spirits.
83	10	"The Cursed Path"	Private home, Roseburg, Oregon	September 6, 2014
Amy and Steve travel to Oregon to help a couple whose residence is also a nursing home, all who live in the house claim to hear noises and see apparitions throughout the building. Steve discovers that the area the property lies on was home to brutal massacres and bloody battles as well as murder. Amy's walk reveals what she believes is a doorway to other dimensions on a path close to the home where non-human entities manage to slip in and out of the human world that humans can also become lost in this portal.
84	11	"Bound"	Fort Barnwell, New Bern, North Carolina	September 13, 2014
Amy and Steve head to a historic home that is the site of a family they say is being torn apart by paranormal activity, the wife wanting to leave the home without a second thought whilst her husband wishes to stay and fight what he bleives are entities that reside in the home. The investigation takes Steve back in time to the early days of Neusiok massacres and tragedy, while Amy's walk leads to the possibility one of the homeowners is a medium, a person who can communicate with spirits.
85	12	"Living Nightmare"	Private Home, Flint, Michigan	November 1, 2014
Amy and Steve return to Flint when a police detective requests their help with his family home which only his mother lives in currently, everyone else not wanting to deal with the activity in the home, among the incidents is the family members having been attacked in their sleep by what they believe is an unseen entity, Steve's research reveals the dark history that has plagued the property for decades, Amy's walk revealing that she believes multiple entities were residing inside and outside of the home.
86	13	"Eternal Hatred"	Private Home, Chester Springs, Pennsylvania	November 8, 2014
Amy and Steve receive a call for help from a family who say that their countryside home is being terrorized by frightening paranormal activity, and claims that a presence tries to control them while in the barn outside the house. During research, Steve discovers that a murder had occurred on the property one-hundred years prior to the current family's residence, however, Amy also finds what she believes is an entity residing in the barn is a demon, trying to force the family into harming, even killing each other.
87	14	"Intolerance"	Barbee Hotel and Grill, Warsaw, Indiana	November 15, 2014
Amy and Steve head to the midwest to help a hotel owner who claims that his business is suffering due to the activity, Steve's research into the hotel's past reveals that in the 1800s, the land that eventually became the hotel was the site of a brutal double homicide, meanwhile Amy's walk discovers what she believes are entities in the hotel, the most prominent are a dead woman who was the sole survivor of a brutal attack against her family and a male entity who is aggressive towards the living.
88	15	"Revisited: Never Alone and Spellbound"	TBA	November 22, 2014
89	16	"Revisited: Tortured Souls and Evil Within"	TBA	November 29, 2014
90	17	"Revisited: Plagued and Lethal Waters"	TBA	December 6, 2014
91	18	"Revisited: Dead End and Summoning Souls"	TBA	December 13, 2014
92	19	"Revisited: Forever Scarred and Invaded"	TBA	December 20, 2014
93	20	"Revisited: Master of the Damned and Ghosts of Deadwood"	TBA	December 27, 2014
94	21	"Revisited: Innocent Blood & Fractured"	TBA	January 3, 2015

=== Season 6 (2015–16) ===
No. overall	No. in season	Title	Location	Original release date
95	1	"Guardians of The Dead"	Rose Hall, Montego Bay, Jamaica	April 25, 2015
Steve and Amy travel to Jamaica's famed Rose Hall for their first international investigation, the research and the walkthrough explore the history and a deadly legend behind a previous owner of the hall.
96	2	"Deranged"	Private home, Falconer, New York	May 2, 2015
Steve and Amy head to rural New York when a mother of three believes violent paranormal activity is taking place. Amy's walk discovers what she Amy's walk discovers what she believes is a spirit in the home who was a fanatical religious man, who wants the family out of those house because in his eyes they are "unclean".
97	3	"House of Mirrors"	Private home, Independence, Oregon	May 9, 2015
Amy and Steve head to Oregon when a man calls desperate for help due to bizarre activity in his home, his partner and son believe they are victims of the more malevolent activity that occurs in the home. Steve's research details the past events that had occurred on the land where the property currently sits and Amy's walk involves sinister entities referred to as "Tricksters" whom seem to have a diabolical purpose for the residents.
98	4	"The Instigator"	Private home, Pittsburgh, Pennsylvania	May 16, 2015
99	5	"The Obsession"	The Road House, Oregon, Illinois	May 30, 2015
100	6	"From Beyond"	Private home, Macon, Georgia	June 6, 2015
Amy and Steve head to Georgia where a family reports feeling constantly watched; and the daughter is having nightmares and being physically harassed. Steve’s research details the property’s civil war history. Amy’s walk reveals what she believes are the spirits of a feuding father and son, along with alien visitations focused on the daughter and son of the family.
101	7	"Afflicted"	Private home, Covington, Louisiana	June 13, 2015
Amy and Steve head to Louisiana where a family is experiencing health problems, and what they believe are apparitions, and physical harassment. Steve’s research details the tragic lives of the previous landowners. Including a reckless unstable man who died in a shootout he instigated, and his wife who had to deal with him. Amy’s walk reveals what she believes is a dead man in a tree who is focused on the living father; a dead woman determined to torment the living mother; and a demonic entity usually associated with addicts that has attached itself to their young daughter.
102	8	"Torn Apart"	Private home, Struthers, Ohio	June 20, 2015
103	9	"Perfect Storm"	Private home, Delaware, Ohio	June 27, 2015
A family in Ohio say they are experiencing slamming doors, apparitions, and physical harassment. Steve’s research details a man who was killed by his wife’s forced baptism, a young woman murdered by her lover, and former owners who went insane. Amy’s walk reveals what she believes is a deceased sociopath woman who had conflict with her husband and mother in-law, and a psychokinesis entity that was formed by the house and all the negative energy it absorbed.
104	10	"The Creeper"	Private home, Coupland, Texas	July 11, 2015
105	11	"Madhouse"	Marshall Cinema, Marshall, Missouri	July 18, 2015
106	12	"Vengeance"	High Noon Restaurant & Saloon, Albuquerque, New Mexico	July 25, 2015
107	13	"Smothered"	Private home, Delmont, Pennsylvania	August 1, 2015
108	14	"Revisited: Demon War and Assaulted"	TBA	November 7, 2015
109	15	"Revisited: Satan's Revenge and Double Jeopardy"	TBA	November 14, 2015
110	16	"Revisited: Feeding Grounds and The Aftermath"	TBA	November 21, 2015
111	17	"Revisited: Eternal Hatred and Intolerance"	TBA	November 28, 2015
112	18	"Revisited: The Dark One and Deranged"	TBA	December 5, 2015
113	19	"Revisited: House of Mirrors and The Obsession"	TBA	December 12, 2015
114	20	"Revisited: Afflicted and Torn Apart"	TBA	December 19, 2015
115	21	"Revisited: The Creeper and Madhouse"	TBA	December 26, 2015
116	22	"Revisited: Ghosts of Deadwood and Smothered"	TBA	January 2, 2016

=== Season 7 (2016) ===
No. overall	No. in season	Title	Location	Original release date
117	1	"Toys For The Dead"	Dumas Brothel Museum Butte, Montana	April 2, 2016
118	2	"Evil Influence"	Private home, Mayfield, Kentucky	April 9, 2016
119	3	"No Vacancy"	Holebrook Hotel Grass Valley, California	April 16, 2016
120	4	"Gateway to Hell"	Private home, Lake Jackson, Texas	April 23, 2016
121	5	"The Darkening"	Private home Wausau, Wisconsin	April 30, 2016
122	6	"Bent on Revenge"	Private home, Sicily Island, Louisiana	May 7, 2016
123	7	"Contempt"	Private home, North Haven, Connecticut	May 14, 2016
124	8	"You Will Be Mine"	Private home, North Beach, Maryland	May 21, 2016
125	9	"Return To Evil"	Private home, Patricksburg, Indiana	May 28, 2016
126	10	"Devil's Plaything"	Private home, Canton, Illinois	June 4, 2016
127	11	"Crowded House"	Private home, Richmond Heights, Ohio	June 11, 2016
128	12	"The Whispering"	Private home, Concrete, Washington	June 18, 2016
129	13	"Paradise Lost"	Private home, Waipahu, Hawaii	June 25, 2016
130	14	"The Sacrifice"	East Flat Rock, North Carolina	August 13, 2016
Allan and DiSchiavi investigate distressing paranormal activity at a home in North Carolina.
131	15	"The Predator"	Gates, North Carolina	August 20, 2016
Allan and DiSchiavi investigate dangerously disturbing paranormal activity at a family home in Gates, NC.
132	16	"Controlled"	Estill Springs, Tennessee	August 27, 2016
Allan and DiSchiavi investigate chilling paranormal activity at a family's home in Tennessee.
133	17	"Compelled"	St. Charles, Michigan	September 3, 2016
Allan and DiSchiavi investigate paranormal activity affecting the emotions of a mother and daughter in secluded St. Charles, Michigan. During their separate investigations, Steve digs into the town's mining history to find a down-on-his-luck farmer with a life of tragedy, while Amy encounters what she believes are influential spirits capable of projecting horrific emotions of shame and fear on the living.
134	18	"Consumed"	Youngstown, Ohio	September 10, 2016
Allan and DiSchiavi investigate a terminally ill woman's claims that aggressive paranormal activity is ripping her family apart in Youngstown, Ohio. During their separate investigations, Steve uncovers the property's connection to a gruesome mob hit, while Amy confronts a negative energy she believes is so powerful, it can influence the dead -- and the living.
135	19	"Deadly Relations"	Lake City, Florida	September 17, 2016
Allan and DiSchiavi investigate claims of paranormal activity at a home in Lake City, Florida. Steve tracks down the home's history and discovers that the client's mother was killed inside the home by a family member, while Amy encounters what she believes is an entity that can manipulate and influence the living to commit violent acts.

=== Season 8 (2017) ===
No. overall	No. in season	Title	Location	Original release date	Viewers (millions)
135	1	"The Watcher"	Private home, Paso Robles, California	February 4, 2017	0.59
136	2	"Fear Lives Here"	Private home, Magna, Utah	February 11, 2017	0.66
137	3	"Legion of Death"	Private home, Spartanburg, South Carolina	February 18, 2017	0.59
138	4	"It Feeds"	Private home, Santa Rosa Beach, Florida	February 25, 2017	0.77
139	5	"Feeding The Fire"	Private home, Kaufman, Texas	March 4, 2017	0.69
140	6	"Drawn to Evil"	Private home, Medina, New York	March 11, 2017	0.59
141	7	"The Offering"	Restaurant, Sedona, Arizona	March 18, 2017	0.63
Steve and Amy investigate claims of terrifying paranormal activity at the Relics Restaurant & Roadhouse. During their investigation, Steve examines an unsolved murder case as well as the devastating fate of the Yavapai and Tonto Apache in the Battle of Salt River Canyon, while Amy says she encounters frightening, unpredictable entities at every turn during her walk through the property.
142	8	"Hell in the Heartland"	Private home, Kearney, Missouri	May 6, 2017	0.62
Claims of paranormal activity at a family home in a small town. Steve tracks down the history of a ruthless Civil War-era gang leader, while Amy says she encounters several deceased individuals, including a trapped male spirit and a dead woman capable of physically assaulting the living.
143	9	"Night Terrors"	Private home, Brumley, Missouri	May 13, 2017	0.57
Paranormal disturbances are claimed to keep customers awake at an historic bed and breakfast. While Steve's investigation reveals a surprising past involving medicine, religion, and a horrific murder-suicide, Amy says she encounters several translucent entities, one of which is stalking the living from within the building's walls.
144	10	"Deadly Promise"	Tattoo parlor, Chicago, Illinois	May 20, 2017	0.61
Employees and customers at funeral home-turned-tattoo parlor are terrorized. While Steve's investigation reveals a shocking past involving the mysterious death of the original owner's wife, Amy says she encounters two dangerous entities who like watching, and sometimes interacting, with the living.
145	11	"A Widow's Revenge"	Museum, Dumfries, Virginia	May 27, 2017	0.59
Volunteers and visitors are tormented at a historic museum. During the investigation, Amy says she encounters a female spirit wishing to harm the living.
146	12	"Skin Walker"	Private home, Hardinsburg, Indiana	June 3, 2017	0.52
An affected family fear for the safety of their sick father. While Steve's investigation reveals a fanatical preacher who led an armed revolt against his own church formerly on the property, Amy says she encounters a twisted entity that can mimic the living and trap the souls of the deceased.
147	13	"Return of the Damned"	Private home, Evans, Georgia	June 10, 2017	0.60
A family claims that paranormal activity led to the death of their 41-year-old son. Steve investigates the property's past filled with slavery and murder, while Amy says she encounters a dead child capable of inflicting physical pain on the living.
148	14	"While the Children Sleep"	Private home, Olympia, Washington	August 5, 2017	0.63
A mother claims malicious paranormal activity is directed at her children and elderly mother. Steve learns of a deadly explosion that killed nearly a dozen people, and Amy says she encounters a vengeful murder victim.
149	15	"The Devil Inside"	Private home, Applegate, California	August 12, 2017	0.56
A cancer survivor and her family are allegedly threatened by paranormal activity in their home. Steve's investigation reveals an execution-style killing connected to a cult near the property. Amy says she encounters demonic gargoyles that prey on the living.
150	16	"Deadly Kin"	Private home, Louisville, Kentucky	August 19, 2017	0.62
Paranormal violence allegedly threatens the lives of a grieving elderly woman and her daughter. During her walk, Amy says she encounters the spirit of an angry man with a deadly mission.
151	17	"Lust to Kill"	Private home, Victor, New York	August 26, 2017	0.53
Two Army veterans fear that whatever paranormal activity is happening inside their home could kill them and their family. While Steve's investigation uncovers a double homicide with ties to the property, Amy says she encounters a serial-killing widow who's targeted the family as her next victims.
152	18	"Influence to Kill"	Private home, Layton, Utah	September 2, 2017	0.55
A grandfather fears for the life and safety of his grandson. The investigation claims to uncover a psychotic dead man attempting to possess the grandson as well as a portal inside his bedroom that allows shadow people to infest the house.
153	19	"Drained"	Private home, Ripley, West Virginia	September 9, 2017	0.49
Paranormal activity allegedly threatens the lives of a father and his family. The investigation claims to uncover a powerful demon terrorizing the family, along with a psychic vampire who threatens to suck the life force from everyone who lives in the house.
154	20	"Shattered"	Private home, Sinclairville, New York	September 16, 2017	0.61
A mother of two believes paranormal activity is responsible for the disintegration of her marriage and physical attacks on her children. The investigation claims to uncover a mysterious entity that is causing the dead to lash out at the living.

=== Season 9 (2018) ===
No. overall	No. in season	Title	Location	Original release date	Viewers (millions)
155	1	"Triggered"	(Private Residence), Flint, Michigan	February 3, 2018	0.55
Paranormal activity allegedly harasses a young family. Steve's investigation of the property exposes a family man with a murderous past, and Amy says she confronts a sinister entity that preys on the vulnerable.
156	2	"Deadly Reflections"	(Private Residence), Waxahachie, Texas	February 10, 2018	0.62
Steve and Amy return to Waxahachie, Texas, to investigate a widow's claim that the paranormal killed her husband and is targeting her daughter. During her walk, Amy says she finds an evil mass and mirrors that act as a pathway for the dead.
157	3	"Killer Instinct"	(Private Residence), El Cajon, California	February 17, 2018	0.56
A grandfather, young couple, and their children claim to be tormented by paranormal activity in their home. While Steve discovers the unsettling details of an infamous serial killer in the area, Amy says she confronts a vengeful spirit.
158	4	"Jumped"	Palmer House Hotel, Sauk Centre, Minnesota	February 24, 2018	0.55
Steve and Amy investigate The Palmer House, an historic hotel where it is claimed that the dead enjoy tormenting its employees and guests. During the investigation, Amy says she confronts a dark presence attempting to take control of her physical being.
159	5	"Desert Curse"	Private home, Sahuarita, Arizona	March 3, 2018	0.54
It is claimed that Paranormal activity terrorizes an older Arizona couple. While Steve's investigation reveals the property's bloody history, Amy says she uncovers an entity hellbent on trapping the souls of the living.
160	6	"The Uninvited"	Private home, Slaughters, Kentucky	March 10, 2018	0.55
Steve and Amy investigate alleged paranormal activity terrorizing a recently separated mother and her two children. Amy's walk is claimed to lead her to an interdimensional portal filled with malicious aliens set on tormenting the living.
161	7	"Lullaby for the Dead"	Private home, Briceville, Tennessee	March 17, 2018	0.54
A single mother fears for the safety of her children and the sanctity of her home as it is claimed that vengeful spirits torment them. During her walk, Amy says she discovers a vindictive spirit who hates children.
162	8	"Evil Descends"	Private home, Murrieta, California	April 1, 2018	0.25
A mother worries that her husband's dealings in witchcraft have led to paranormal activity tearing her family apart.
163	9	"Inviting Evil"	Private home, Berthoud, Colorado	April 8, 2018	0.37
A terrified woman asks Steve and Amy to investigate claims of vicious paranormal activity at her home. During her walk, Amy says she encounters a demon set on tormenting the living and a malevolent shadow person.
164	10	"Innocence Lost"	Private home, Elkview, West Virginia	April 15, 2018	0.36
A mother fears that the paranormal activity tormenting her family was brought on by the birth of her youngest son. The investigation leads to the claimed discovery of a vortex where entities come and go.
165	11	"Dark Thoughts"	Private home, Waterford, Connecticut	April 22, 2018	0.33
A recently separated mother claims that the paranormal is attacking her and her children. Amy discovers that the key to what's haunting the living may not necessarily reside with the dead.
166	12	"Terrorland"	Abandoned amusement park, Lake Shawnee, West Virginia	June 1, 2018	0.65
Steve and Amy investigate an abandoned amusement park. While Steve uncovers Shawnee attacks and multiple drownings, Amy says she encounters a vengeful group of dead that will stop at nothing to reclaim its land.
167	13	"Easy Prey"	Private home, Grant Township, Michigan	June 8, 2018	0.54
A desperate couple claims paranormal activity is trying to kill them. During the disturbing investigation, Amy says she encounters a malicious dead man and an elemental capable of physically harming the living.

=== Season 10 (2018) ===
No. overall	No. in season	Title	Location	Original release date	Viewers (millions)
168	1	"Taken"	Private home, Mahwah, New Jersey	June 15, 2018	0.57
A family of six believes it is being destroyed by paranormal activity. During her walk, Amy says she encounters a woman intent on attacking everyone in the house and a group of demonic entities capable of possessing the living.
169	2	"Tangled"	Private home, Berlin Heights, Ohio	June 22, 2018	0.59
It is claimed that vicious supernatural activity torments a mother and her two daughters. During her walk, Amy says she encounters a menacing dead woman who physically assaults the living and a dangerous vine-like entity.
170	3	"Deadly Intentions"	Home business, New Franken, Wisconsin	June 29, 2018	0.54
It is claimed that violent activity is ruining a woman's hopes of opening her dream holistic business out of her former home. While Steve learns of two tragedies in the area, Amy says she encounters a dozen shadow people harboring death, doom, and destruction.
171	4	"A Thousand Pieces"	Private home, Bogalusa, Louisiana	July 6, 2018	0.55
A woman claims that a vicious supernatural entity killed her father and is wreaking havoc on her family. During her walk, Amy says she encounters a vindictive dead man and a powerful psychokinetic entity that consumes personalities.
172	5	"The Bethlehem Haunting"	Private home, Bethlehem, Pennsylvania	July 13, 2018	0.57
It is claimed that paranormal activity terrorizes a vulnerable mother and her child. During Amy's walk, she says she encounters several entities, including a dead man intent on possessing and tormenting the living.
173	6	"The Lady in Black"	Private home, Marshalltown, Iowa	July 20, 2018	0.54
It is claimed that unusual activity torments married paranormal investigators. During her walk, Amy says she encounters the spirit of a malicious dead woman set on taking the life of their son.
174	7	"The Cult"	Private home, Chatsworth, California	July 27, 2018	0.54
A terrified woman believes that her house is trying to kill her. Steve learns the property sits on the former Iverson Movie Ranch, which has a connection with two cults, that of Krishna Venta and the Manson Family, respectively. During her walk, Amy claims that the owner is unknowingly attracting the dead and demons who torment the living.
175	8	"Collision Course"	Multi-use business, Oregon, Ohio	August 3, 2018	0.64
It is claimed that violent paranormal activity affects a terrified married couple and their son at their business. During her walk, Amy claims that two groups of dead people battle each other and the living.
176	9	"Cursed"	Private home, Pinellas Park, Florida	August 10, 2018	0.60
A mother claims that ever since her son moved in, paranormal activity has gotten violent and out of control. During his investigation, Steve learns of two deaths associated with the house, and Amy fears a living person that dabbled in witchcraft lured dark entities to the home to curse the family.
177	10	"Dead Rising"	Home & business, Jones, Alabama	August 17, 2018	0.52
A family is claimed to be torn apart by entities intent on destroying their home and business. During her walk, Amy says she encounters a vicious group of dead men and a powerful shadow man menacing the living.
178	11	"'Til Death"	Private home, Wymore, Nebraska	August 24, 2018	0.53
A woman believes paranormal activity has taken control of her husband. During Amy's walk, she says she encounters a mischievous trickster whose pranks are becoming increasingly vicious.
179	12	"Killing Fields"	Private home, Springfield, Ohio	August 31, 2018	0.55
A man believes that something on his property is attacking his mother. Amy claims the land is suffering under a curse that hinders the lives of the living and encounters a bitter dead man using the curse to his advantage.
180	13	"Damaged"	Private home, Winchester, Kentucky	September 7, 2018	0.55
A woman claims something in her house is attacking her kids and changing her husband's personality. During her walk, Amy says a dead cowboy can cause the living to die from heart attacks, aneurysms, or other deadly illnesses.

=== Season 11 (2019) ===
No. overall	No. in season	Title	Location	Original release date	Viewers (millions)
181	1	"Darkness Rises"	Private home, Tonawanda, New York	July 11, 2019	0.50
A frightened woman claims that decades of paranormal activity in her home have now become dangerously violent. During their investigations, Steve uncovers the story of a twisted teenager who poisoned several children, while Amy's walk reveals a dark entity tormenting residents for years.
182	2	"Demon Seed"	Private home, Gatesville, Texas	July 18, 2019	0.43
A couple is being tormented by demonic entities destroying their home and their grandchildren. Steve uncovers the dark and sordid history of a boys' reformatory turned female prison, while Amy encounters a vicious serpent-like entity set on contaminating the souls of all who inhabit the property.
183	3	"The Watchers"	Private home, Blue Springs, Missouri	July 25, 2019	0.43
A mother fears for the safety of her children as unseen forces torment them on a daily basis. Steve discovers the property was the scene of a gruesome murder-suicide in the 1960s, while Amy encounters the spirit of a dead man who has a deep resentment towards women and children and agents of Death awaiting one child's demise.
184	4	"Not My Child"	Private home, Jefferson City, Missouri	August 1, 2019	0.48
A family has abandoned their new home, in order to escape the intense paranormal activity inside of it. Even worse, they're worried their young daughter has been possessed by one of the dark entities tormenting them.
185	5	"Lost Souls"	Private home, New London, Wisconsin	August 8, 2019	0.45
At a former nursing home, later a haunted house and now a home, powerful paranormal activity pushes a family to its wit's end. The parents fear one of their children may have summoned a demonic entity through Ouija.
186	6	"Evil Comes Home"	Private home, Colorado Springs, Colorado	August 15, 2019	0.37
A team of ghost hunters fear they brought violent activity home from one of their investigations. Both women need answers before things turn deadly.
187	7	"Deadly Vessel"	Restaurant, New Orleans	August 22, 2019	0.46
Owners of a church-turned-restaurant are experiencing unexplained activity and are concerned for their employees and guests.
188	8	"Going Rogue"	Private home, Springfield, Ohio	August 29, 2019	0.40
A woman is losing her temper and has changes in her personality. Her family believes she might be possessed, and she fears something in the house.
189	9	"Devil's Triangle"	Tattoo parlor, Pittsburgh	September 5, 2019	0.38
Tattoo artists and their customers fear for their safety in Downtown Pittsburgh.
190	10	"The Blurry Man"	Private home, Highland Park, Illinois	September 12, 2019	0.45
A panicked family believes their new home is "hell on Earth".
191	11	"Rage"	Private home, Lynchburg, Ohio	September 19, 2019	0.41
Amy and Steve investigate a former MMA fighter's home.
192	12	"Absorbed"	Horse farm, Hartford, Wisconsin	September 26, 2019	0.35
A family feels threatened on their horse farm. Steve discovers that the previous owner was a religious fanatic.
193	13	"Deadly Force"	Private home, Florida Everglades	October 3, 2019	0.43
Steve and Amy meet with a Reiki master and investigate her home.

=== Season 12 (2019–20) ===
No. overall	No. in season	Title	Location	Original release date	Viewers (millions)
194	1	"Driven to Kill"	Private home, Toledo, Ohio	December 3, 2019	0.34
195	2	"Town of the Dead"	Private home, Upper Darby Township, Pennsylvania	December 10, 2019	0.35
196	3	"The Gateway"	Private home, Wakefield, Massachusetts	December 17, 2019	0.37
197	4	"Puppet Master"	Private home, Indianapolis, Indiana	February 20, 2020	0.41
198	5	"Dark Soul"	Private home, Pataskala, Ohio	February 27, 2020	0.42
199	6	"Last Call"	Bar, Palatka, Florida	March 5, 2020	0.43
200	7	"Detox"	Private home, Elizabeth City, North Carolina	March 12, 2020	0.54
201	8	"Entangled"	Private home, Newtown, Pennsylvania	March 19, 2020	0.56
202	9	"Never Human"	Private home, New Philadelphia, Ohio	March 26, 2020	0.48
203	10	"Deadly Intruder"	Private home, Watertown, Wisconsin	April 2, 2020	0.47
204	11	"The Visitors"	Private home, Coleraine, Minnesota	April 9, 2020	0.55
205	12	"The Craving"	Private home, Tucson, Arizona	April 16, 2020	0.58
206	13	"Damned in the Desert"	Private home, Marana, Arizona	April 23, 2020	0.54

=== Season 13 (2021) ===
No. overall	No. in season	Title	Location	Original release date	Viewers (millions)
207	1	"The Hunted"	Springfield, Ohio	January 4, 2021 (Discovery+)	N/A
208	2	"He Lurks"	Fresno, California	January 4, 2021 (Discovery+)	N/A
209	3	"Marked for Death"	Glendale, Arizona	January 4, 2021 (Discovery+)	N/A
210	4	"The Bone Collector"	Discovery Bay, California	January 11, 2021 (Discovery+)	N/A
211	5	"Shop of Horrors"	Modesto, California	January 18, 2021 (Discovery+)	N/A
212	6	"The Demon's Quest"	Oakland, Oregon	January 25, 2021 (Discovery+)	N/A
213	7	"The Wanderer"	Sutter, California	February 1, 2021 (Discovery+)	N/A
214	8	"They Come From the Hills"	Lake Elsinore, California	February 8, 2021 (Discovery+)	N/A
215	9	"Shadowed Evil"	Cedar Falls, Iowa	February 15, 2021 (Discovery+)	N/A
216	10	"Mortal Danger"	San Jose, California	February 22, 2021 (Discovery+)	N/A
217	11	"The Deadly Picture Show"	Silent Movie Theatre; Los Angeles, California	March 1, 2021 (Discovery+)	N/A
218	12	"Death's Gallery"	Lancaster, California	March 8, 2021 (Discovery+)	N/A
219	13	"Abducted"	Coolidge, Arizona	March 15, 2021 (Discovery+)	N/A

=== Season 14 (2021–22) ===
No. overall	No. in season	Title	Location	Original release date	Viewers (millions)
220	1	"Victimville"	Victorville, California	October 23, 2021	0.48
221	2	"The Thing"	Oxnard, California	October 30, 2021	0.31
222	3	"The Seether"	Graham, Washington	November 6, 2021	0.32
223	4	"Ruptured"	Port Orchard, Washington	November 13, 2021	0.38
224	5	"Violent Whispers"	Wilmington, North Carolina	November 20, 2021	0.41
225	6	"Darkness Calls"	Wilmington, North Carolina	November 27, 2021	0.34
226	7	"Hell's Kitchen"	Bluffton, South Carolina	February 26, 2022	0.39
227	8	"They Come at Night"	Flatwoods, Kentucky	March 5, 2022	0.42
228	9	"Sudden Awakening"	Shelby Township, Michigan	March 12, 2022	0.45
229	10	"Protect the Children"	Northfield, Ohio	March 19, 2022	0.40
230	11	"Buried"	Euclid, Ohio	March 26, 2022	0.38
231	12	"Special Investigation: The Haunting of Flagstaff"	Flagstaff, Arizona	April 2, 2022	0.37

=== Season 15 (2023) ===
No. overall	No. in season	Title	Location	Original release date	Viewers (millions)
232	1	"Evil in the Everglades"	Kissimmee, Florida	June 1, 2023	0.37
233	2	"Sudden Fury"	Madison, Florida	June 8, 2023	0.29
234	3	"Cabin Fever"	Madison, Alabama	June 15, 2023	0.32
235	4	"Head Games"	Orlando, Florida	June 22, 2023	0.35
236	5	"Killer Smile"	Summerville, South Carolina	June 29, 2023	0.28
Note: This is Amy Allan's final episode.
237	6	"Shadows of Death"	Tucson, Arizona	July 6, 2023	N/A
Note: This is Cindy Kaza's first episode.
238	7	"The Butcher"	Cibolo, Texas	September 7, 2023	N/A
239	8	"Chaos in the Canyon"	Modjeska Canyon, California	September 14, 2023	N/A
240	9	"Nowhere to Hide"	Westminster, Colorado	September 21, 2023	N/A
241	10	"Imprisoned"	Florence, Arizona	September 28, 2023	N/A
242	11	"Burning Hatred"	Austin, Indiana	October 5, 2023	N/A
243	12	"Isolated"	Crossville, Tennessee	October 12, 2023	N/A
244	13	"The Eternal Haunting"	Octagon Hall, Franklin, Kentucky	October 19, 2023	N/A
