= Rives Township, Michigan =

- Civil township
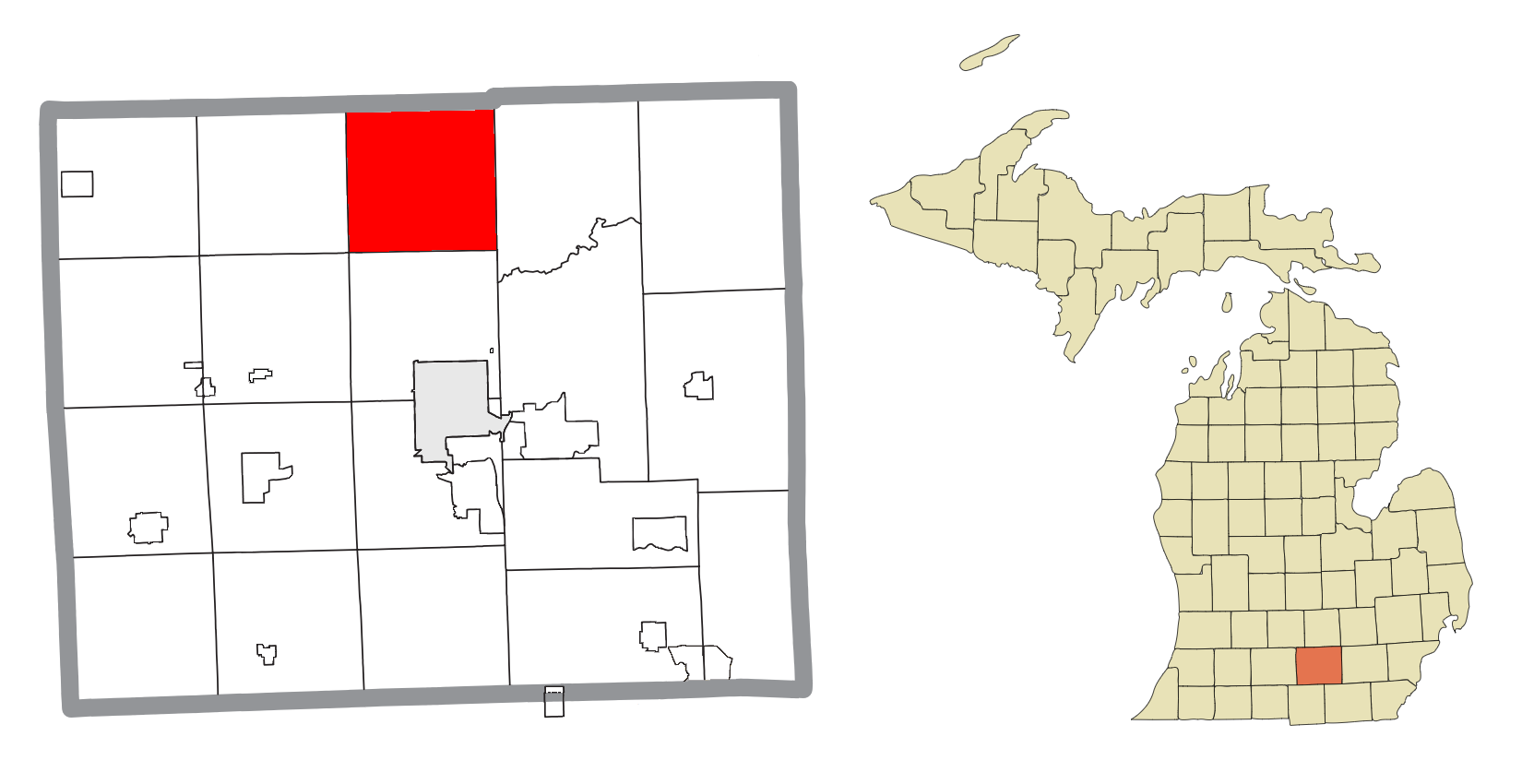
- Location within Jackson County

- Location within the state of Michigan Rives Township (the United States)
- Coordinates: 42°23′09″N 84°25′16″W
- Country: United States
- State: Michigan
- County: Jackson
- Established: 1837

Government
  - Supervisor: Jerald Adams
  - Clerk: Judi McCord
  - Trustee: Bryce Hammond

Area
  - Total: 36.28 sq mi (94.0 km^{2})
  - Land: 35.79 sq mi (92.7 km^{2})
  - Water: 0.49 sq mi (1.3 km^{2})
- Elevation: 978 ft (298 m)

Population (2020)
  - Total: 4,750
  - Density: 133/sq mi (51.2/km^{2})
- Time zone: UTC-5 (Eastern (EST))
  - Summer (DST): UTC-4 (EDT)
- ZIP code(s): 49201 (Jackson); 49251 (Leslie); 49272 (Pleasant Lake); 49277 (Rives Junction)
- Area code: 517
- FIPS code: 26-68920
- GNIS feature ID: 1626987
- Website: Official website

Rives Township is a civil township of Jackson County in the U.S. state of Michigan. The population was 4,750 at the 2020 census.

== Communities ==
- Rives Junction is an unincorporated community in the township at 42°23′09″N 84°27′42″W. It was founded in 1834 by Samuel Prescott and Henry Fifield. A post office named "West Rives" was established on June 15, 1839, with Prescott as the first postmaster, operating from his home on the west side of the Michigan Central Railroad tracks. The community developed on the eastern side of the tracks and was renamed "Eaton Rapids Junction" on March 12, 1866, and again renamed "Rives Junction" on May 7, 1866. The Rives Junction post office, with ZIP Code 49277, continues to serve large portions of Rives Township as well as northeast portions of adjacent Tompkins Township. Rives Junction was the junction between the Michigan Central lines to Saginaw and Grand Rapids.

== Geography ==
According to the United States Census Bureau, the township has a total area of 36.28 square miles (93.96 km^{2}), of which 35.79 square miles (92.70 km^{2}) is land and 0.49 square miles (1.27 km^{2}) (1.35%) is water.

Rives Township is in northern Jackson County, bordered to the north by Ingham County. U.S. Route 127 crosses the center of the township, leading north 28 miles (45 km) to Lansing and south 10 miles (16 km) to Jackson. The township is drained by the Grand River, which crosses from the southern border to the northwest corner.

A portion of Meridian-Baseline State Park is located within Rives Township.

== Demographics ==
As of the census of 2000, there were 4,725 people, 1,677 households, and 1,319 families residing in the township. The population density was 131.6 inhabitants per square mile (50.8/km^{2}). There were 1,745 housing units at an average density of 48.6 per square mile (18.8/km^{2}). The racial makeup of the township was 97.14% White, 0.19% African American, 0.61% Native American, 0.11% Asian, 0.06% Pacific Islander, 0.51% from other races, and 1.38% from two or more races. Hispanic or Latino of any race were 1.76% of the population.

There were 1,677 households, out of which 38.2% had children under the age of 18 living with them, 65.1% were married couples living together, 10.6% had a female householder with no husband present, and 21.3% were non-families. 16.2% of all households were made up of individuals, and 5.6% had someone living alone who was 65 years of age or older. The average household size was 2.80 and the average family size was 3.13.

In the township the population was spread out, with 28.6% under the age of 18, 6.9% from 18 to 24, 30.0% from 25 to 44, 25.2% from 45 to 64, and 9.4% who were 65 years of age or older. The median age was 36 years. For every 100 females, there were 97.3 males. For every 100 females age 18 and over, there were 92.5 males.

The median income for a household in the township was $53,819, and the median income for a family was $58,897. Males had a median income of $42,131 versus $27,743 for females. The per capita income for the township was $22,942. About 6.3% of families and 8.6% of the population were below the poverty line, including 16.4% of those under age 18 and 1.8% of those age 65 or over.
