= Huntoon Lake (Leslie Township, Michigan) =

Lake in Michigan, United States

Coordinates: 42°28′21″N 84°23′08″W

Huntoon Lake is a lake in Leslie Township, Ingham County, Michigan. It drains into Huntoon Creek, which runs through the city of Leslie. The lake is at an elevation of 948 feet (289 m). Named after Isaac Huntoon, who settled in Leslie in 1841 with his family, the lake served as a key water source in the area.
