= Huntoon Creek =

Coordinates: 42°24′13″N 84°26′33″W

Huntoon Creek is a creek flowing through Leslie, Michigan and Leslie Township, originating from Huntoon Lake.

== History ==
Huntoon Creek provided connectivity to the region and powered wheat mills. It was a staple of early Leslie and Leslie Township.

=== Indians ===
19th century settlers found stone arrow heads, skinning knives, hammers, and hatchets. This evidence proved that Indians had made camp there.

=== Mills ===
Huntoon Lake, fed by the creek, supported two mills. The Upper Mill was built Wood-worth, Dwight and Company in 1836. The Lower Mill was built by Henry Meeker, on what became Mill street; a few years later it was dismantled. In 1850 Sidney O. Russell built a steam mill on Bellevue and Spring street, This plant operated for eight years. In 1867 another sawmill was built by E. Oldman and L. G. Becker on the east side of the creek, east of the M. E. Church. After ten years it burned and was rebuilt. The stream eventually powered many mills, but later the dams were destroyed and ponds drained.

The first grist mill was constructed near the Meeker sawmill in 1888 by David Dwight. Ownership changed hands multiple times, with William Spears and Dell Haines each owning it at different points. The mill was ultimately destroyed by fire under the ownership of Henry Mawley.

In 1870, John Burchard built a second grist mill, located east of the railroad near the site of the Meeker mill. Over time, it ceased milling operations and became used as a storage house.

A third grist mill was constructed and operated for several years before it, too, was destroyed by fire.
