= Wolfe Manor =

Mansion in Clovis, California, United States

The Wolfe Manor (originally known as the Andrews Estate, later as the Clovis Avenue Sanitarium and the Andleberry Estate) was a turn of the century mansion located in Clovis, California.

The manor was once a private residence, sanitarium, and eventually a haunted attraction. The property and home, which is now owned by Todd Wolfe, was forced by the city to stop operating as a haunted attraction, due to it being an "eye-sore" and the cause of neighboring property values to decline. For many years, Wolfe tried to turn the manor into a bed and breakfast, but after not being able to fulfill his plans, the city decided in 2014 to have it demolished. Wolfe Manor was rumored to be haunted and has been featured on various TV shows including My Ghost Story, Ghost Hunters, Ghost Adventures, The Dead Files, and MysteryQuest.

== History ==
=== Property names ===
- Andrews Estate (1922-1935)
- Hazelwood Sanitarium (1935-1942)
- Clovis Avenue Sanitarium (1942-mid 1960s)
- Clovis Nursing Home (mid 1960s-1992)
- Andleberry Estate (1996-2007)
- Wolfe Manor (2007–2014)

=== Private residence ===
The mansion was built in 1922 by Anthony Andriotti as a private residence, measuring 8,000 square feet, said to include a ballroom and five bedrooms, plus a swimming pool in the basement.

=== Sanitarium ===
In 1935 the mansion became the Hazelwood Sanitarium. In 1942 it became the Clovis Avenue Sanitarium, and in the 1950s it was licensed by the Department of Mental Hygiene. “In 1954 a hospital wing was added to the house where they treated mental disorders,” Campbell notes. In 1992 the Clovis Avenue Sanitarium was shut down.

=== Demolition ===
In 1996, local entrepreneur Todd Wolfe turned the property into a haunted attraction called “Scream If You Can”. Clovis city's Board of Appeals had declared the vacant house a nuisance and a danger after finding 22 building code violations in the house and surrounding property. In 2011, Clovis designated the house as "unsafe to occupy." The mansion was demolished on Saturday November 8, 2014.

=== Legends and ghost stories ===
According to ghost hunters, the location was haunted, and the building was featured on TV shows, such as Ghost Hunters and Ghost Adventures, and "Dead Files",

== Gallery ==
An old advertisement of the sanitarium that was operating on the Wolfe Manor property.	A view of the Wolfe Manor in Clovis, CA.	The floor plan for the Clovis Sanitarium/Nursing Home complex that includes the mansion and the attached hospital wing.

The 2005 street view of Wolfe Manor that includes the concrete wall that was later removed.	View of the Wolfe Manor in Clovis, CA from the property.	Picture taken in 2001, some of the patient beds that were part of the "Scream If You Can" attraction at Wolfe Manor.	The cast of "The Haunted Wolfe Manor Live" a weekly web show that was broadcast from the mansion in 2008 and 2009.

Tractor demolishes Wolfe Manor in Clovis, CA	As demolition continues, Todd Wolfe speaks to reporters.	The fireplace remains standing in the rubble of Wolfe Manor in Clovis, CA
