= Rob Mancini =

American television producer

Rob Mancini is an American television producer based in Los Angeles. He won a Daytime Emmy Award as supervising producer for Home Made Simple. His shows include, Blank Wall Overhaul, Fast N' Loud, Home Made Simple, Street Outlaws, The Dead Files, and Camp Woodward.
