= Meridian-Baseline State Park =

State park in Michigan, United States

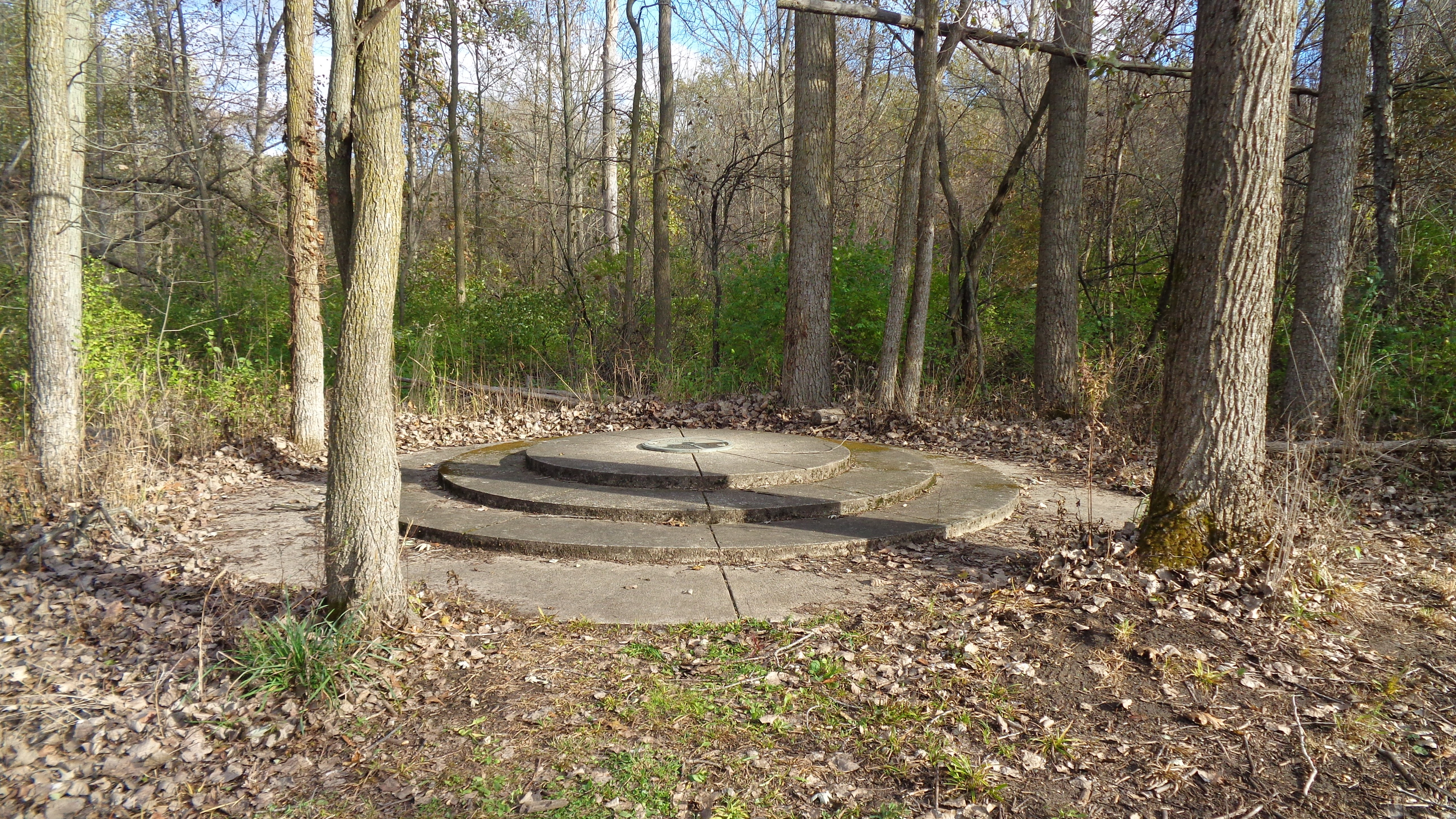
- The West meridian baseline marker

- Location within Michigan Location within the United States
- Location: Ingham and Jackson counties, Michigan
- Nearest city: Leslie, Michigan
- Coordinates: 42°25′26″N 84°21′49″W
- Area: 108 acres (44 ha)
- Elevation: 924 feet (282 m)
- Established: 1967
- Administrator: Michigan Department of Natural Resources
- Designation: Michigan state park
- Website: Official website

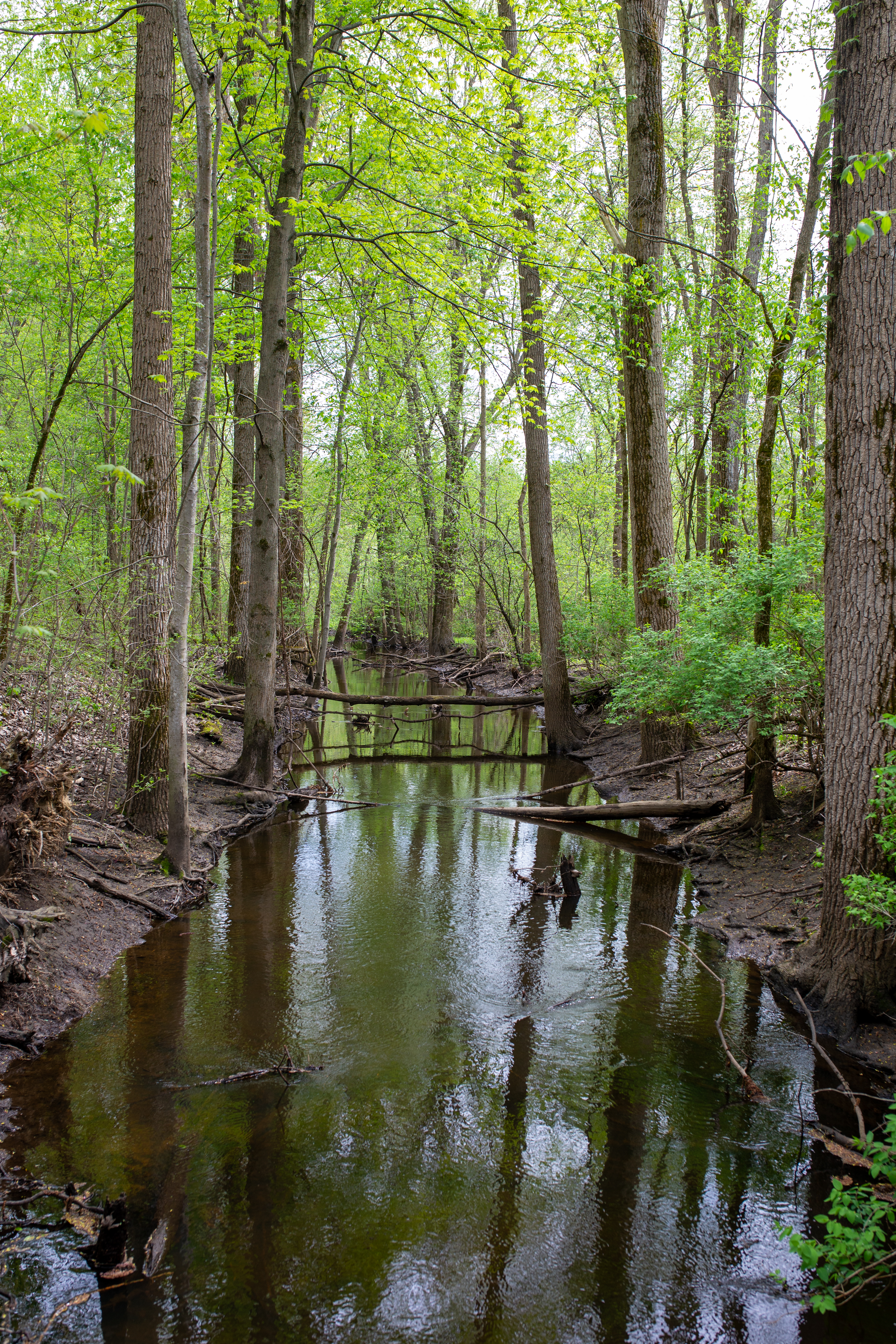
Shaw Branch, a tributary of the Grand River, runs perpendicular to the path. A footbridge allows passage over the river.

Meridian-Baseline State Park is a historic preservation area covering 108 acres (44 ha) in Ingham County and Jackson County, Michigan, containing the intersection of the Michigan meridian and the baseline used for the Michigan Survey. The state park has two monuments that show where the two mismatched baselines meet the principal meridian at the North Initial Point and South Initial Point.

== History ==
Efforts to acquire the site were initiated by state and private interests in the 1960s. In the 1960s and 1970s, land was acquired and money was raised toward establishing a Museum of Surveying on the site. Those efforts were abandoned when the Michigan Society of Professional Surveyors opened a museum in Lansing, Michigan, in 1981.

Although the site was landlocked for many years, in 2014, the Michigan Department of Natural Resources acquired additional property allowing public access from Meridian Road near the Jackson–Ingham county line. Improvements made at the site included trail clearing and construction of a 10-car parking lot. After road signs, trail markers, and a bridge over the creek were added, the State of Michigan in conjunction with Ingham and Jackson counties, opened the new access to the park on October 12, 2015. In 2016, an additional boardwalk was completed in the wetlands near the markers.

== Gallery ==
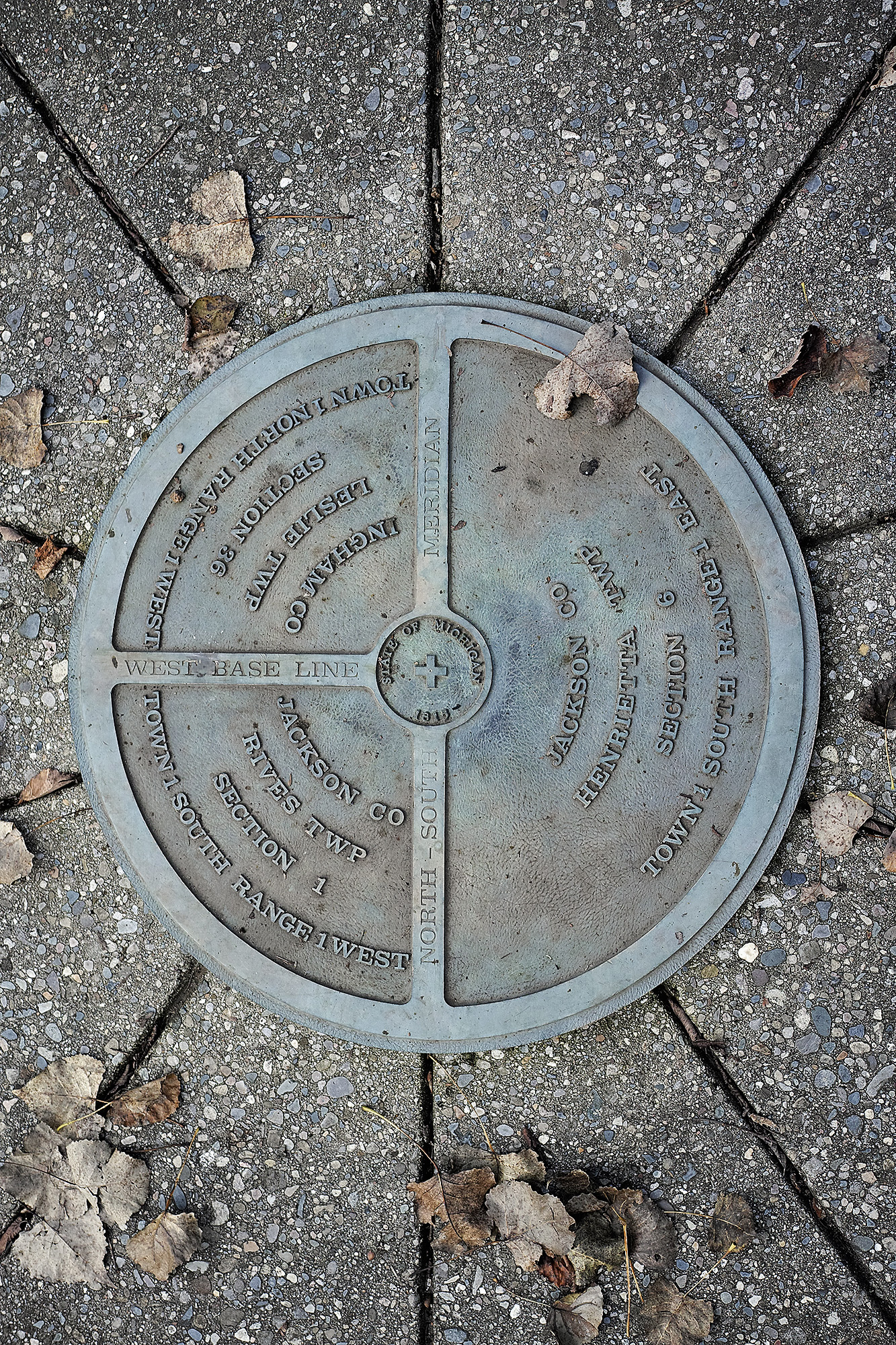
The West Baseline-Meridian marker

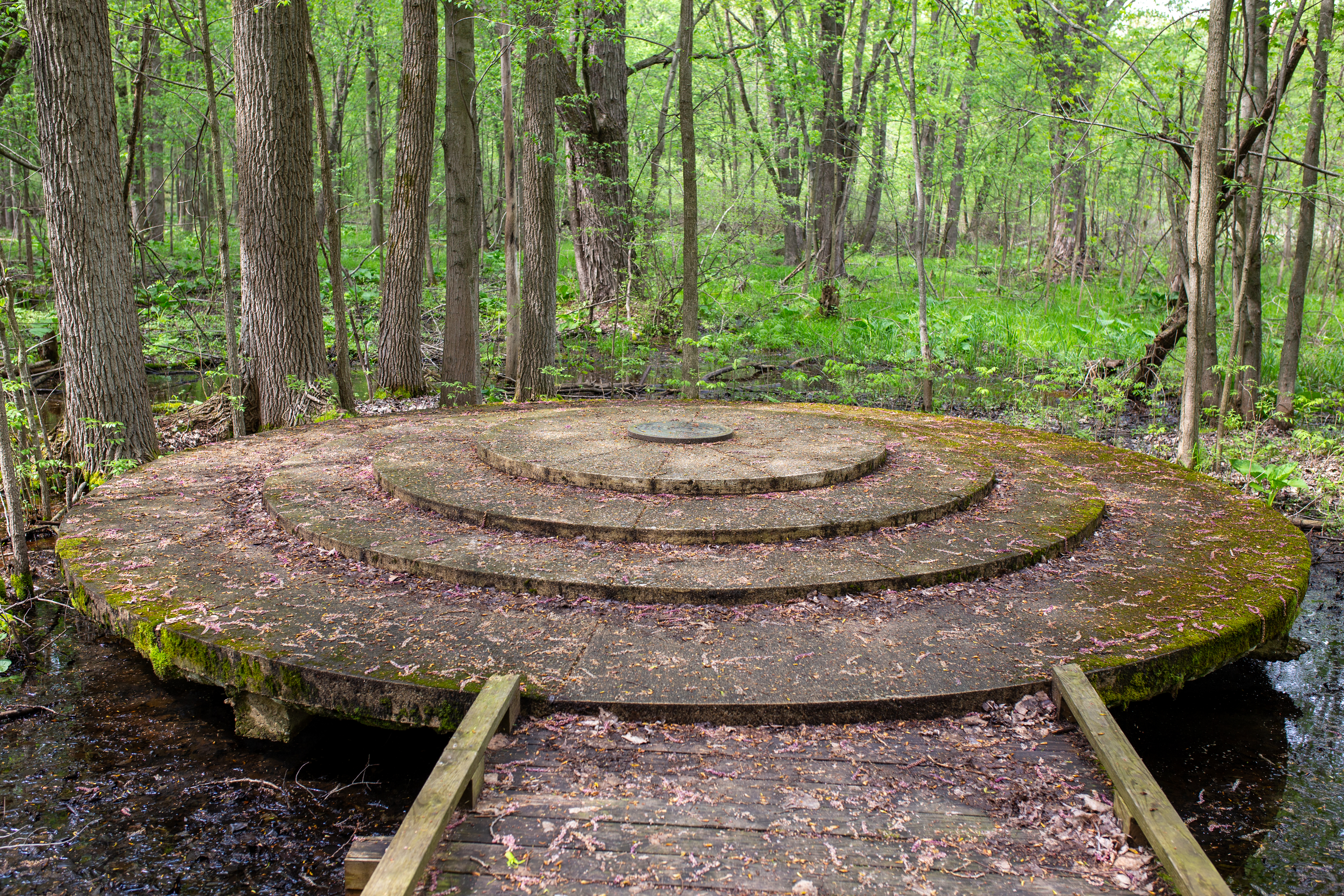
The East Baseline-Meridian marker, in a swamp at the end of a boardwalk, the northern of the two markers.

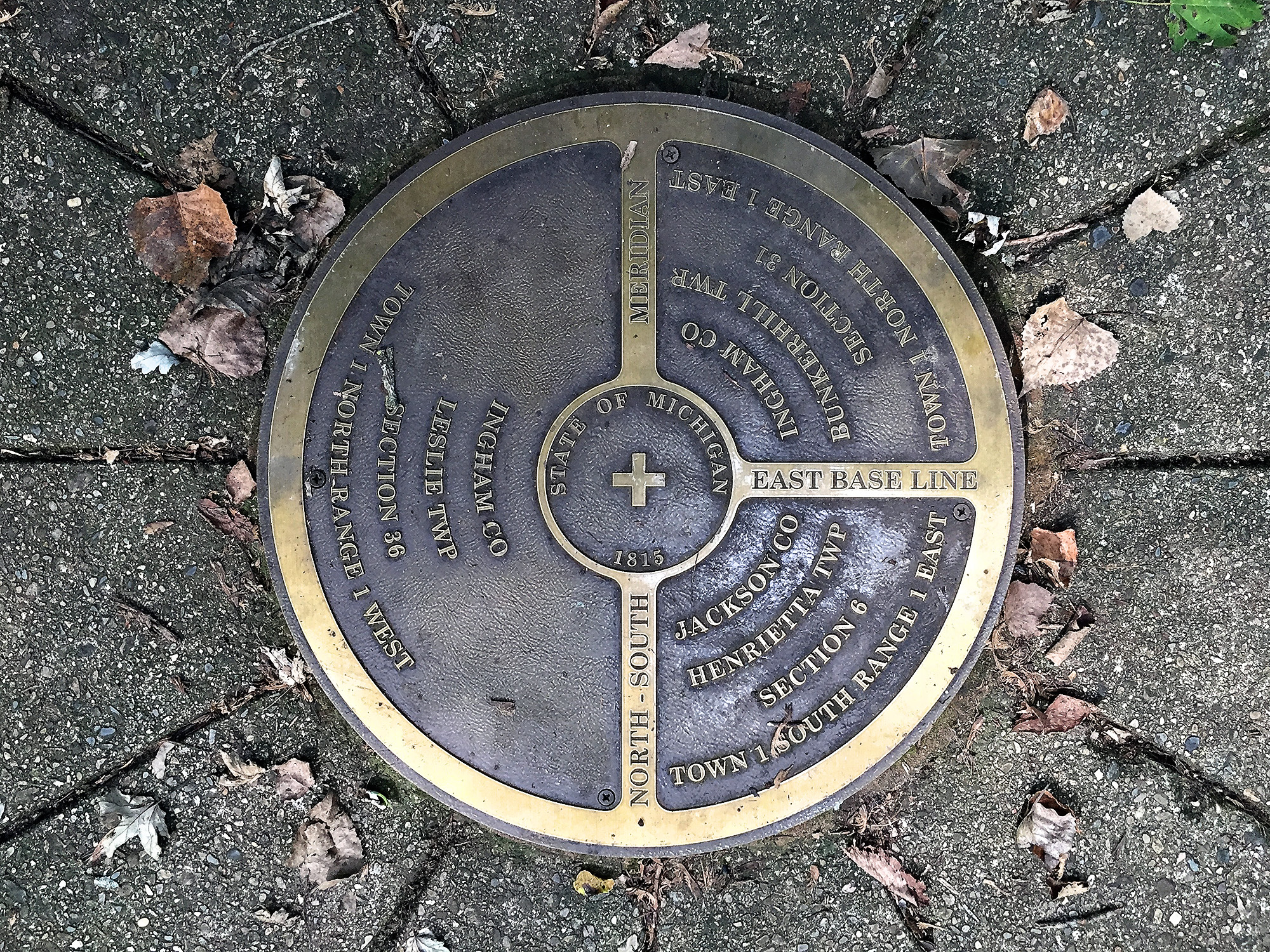
The East Baseline-Meridian marker
