= Tompkins Township, Michigan =

- Civil township
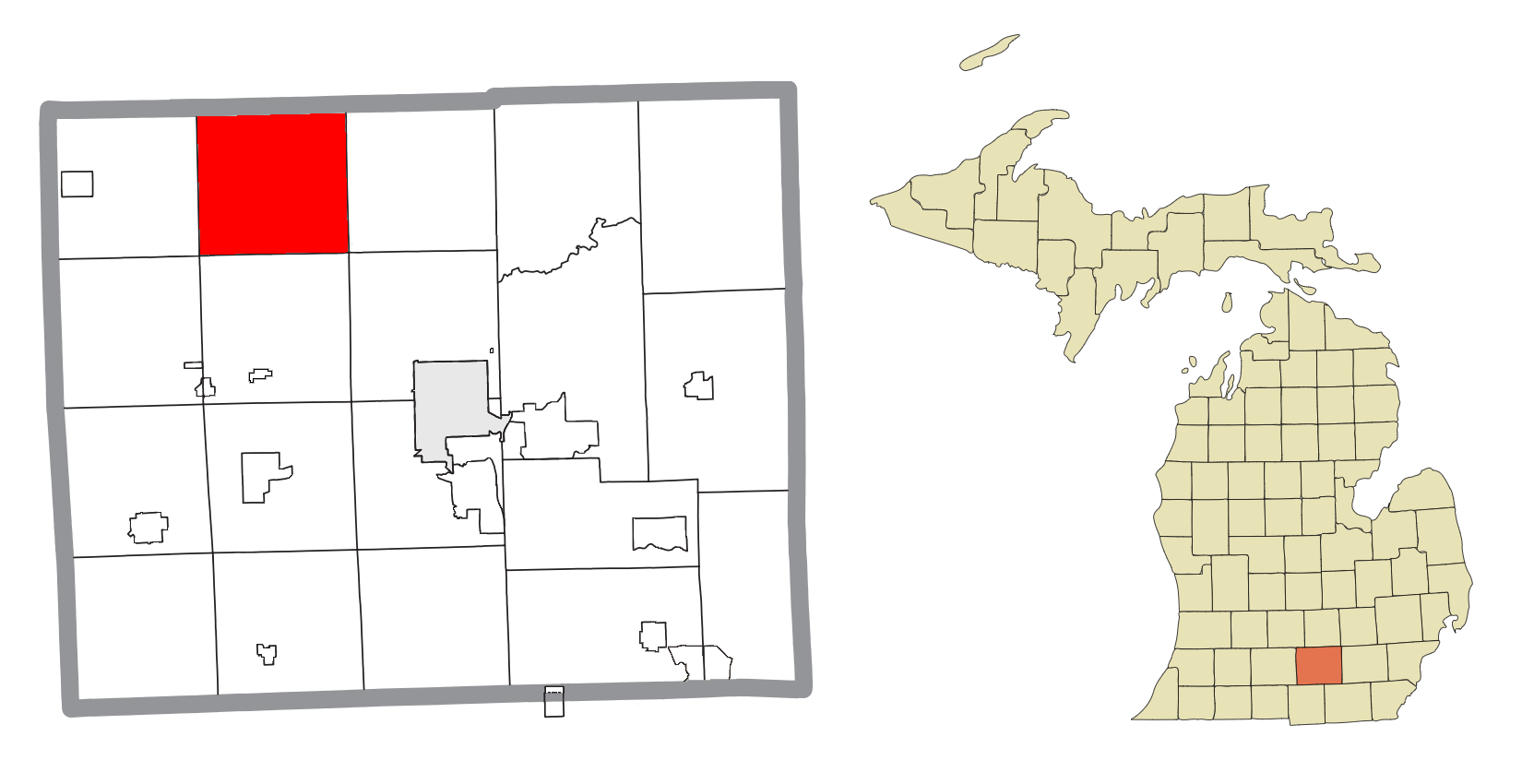
- Location within Jackson County

- Location within the state of Michigan Tompkins Township (the United States)
- Coordinates: 42°22′41″N 84°32′23″W
- Country: United States
- State: Michigan
- County: Jackson
- Established: 1838

Government
  - Supervisor: John Tuttle
  - Clerk: Melanie Curran

Area
  - Total: 36.36 sq mi (94.2 km^{2})
  - Land: 36.01 sq mi (93.3 km^{2})
  - Water: 0.35 sq mi (0.91 km^{2})
- Elevation: 902 ft (275 m)

Population (2020)
  - Total: 2,618
  - Density: 72.70/sq mi (28.07/km^{2})
- Time zone: UTC-5 (Eastern (EST))
  - Summer (DST): UTC-4 (EDT)
- ZIP code(s): 49201 (Jackson); 49264 (Onondaga); 49269 (Parma); 49277 (Rives Junction); 49284 (Springport)
- Area code: 517
- FIPS code: 26-79980
- GNIS feature ID: 1627168
- Website: Official website

Tompkins Township is a civil township of Jackson County in the U.S. state of Michigan. The population was 2,618 at the 2020 census.

== Geography ==
According to the United States Census Bureau, the township has a total area of 36.36 square miles (94.17 km^{2}), of which 36.01 square miles (93.27 km^{2}) is land and 0.35 square miles (0.91 km^{2}) (0.96%) is water.

Tompkins Township is in northwestern Jackson County and is bordered to the north by Ingham County. State highway M-50 crosses the township, leading southeast 14 miles (23 km) to Jackson, the county seat, and northwest 13 miles (21 km) to Eaton Rapids. The Grand River crosses the northeastern portion of the township.

== Demographics ==
As of the census of 2000, there were 2,758 people, 985 households, and 781 families residing in the township. The population density was 76.4 inhabitants per square mile (29.5/km^{2}). There were 1,032 housing units at an average density of 28.6 per square mile (11.0/km^{2}). The racial makeup of the township was 96.74% White, 0.51% African American, 0.18% Native American, 0.15% Asian, 0.80% from other races, and 1.63% from two or more races. Hispanic or Latino of any race were 1.34% of the population.

There were 985 households, out of which 38.6% had children under the age of 18 living with them, 67.0% were married couples living together, 7.6% had a female householder with no husband present, and 20.7% were non-families. 17.2% of all households were made up of individuals, and 6.6% had someone living alone who was 65 years of age or older. The average household size was 2.79 and the average family size was 3.13.

In the township the population was spread out, with 28.9% under the age of 18, 6.4% from 18 to 24, 28.7% from 25 to 44, 25.2% from 45 to 64, and 10.8% who were 65 years of age or older. The median age was 37 years. For every 100 females, there were 98.8 males. For every 100 females age 18 and over, there were 99.0 males.

The median income for a household in the township was $43,203, and the median income for a family was $46,893. Males had a median income of $38,477 versus $22,411 for females. The per capita income for the township was $17,094. About 5.0% of families and 6.8% of the population were below the poverty line, including 9.9% of those under age 18 and 9.4% of those age 65 or over.
