= The Dead Files =

American documentary paranormal TV series

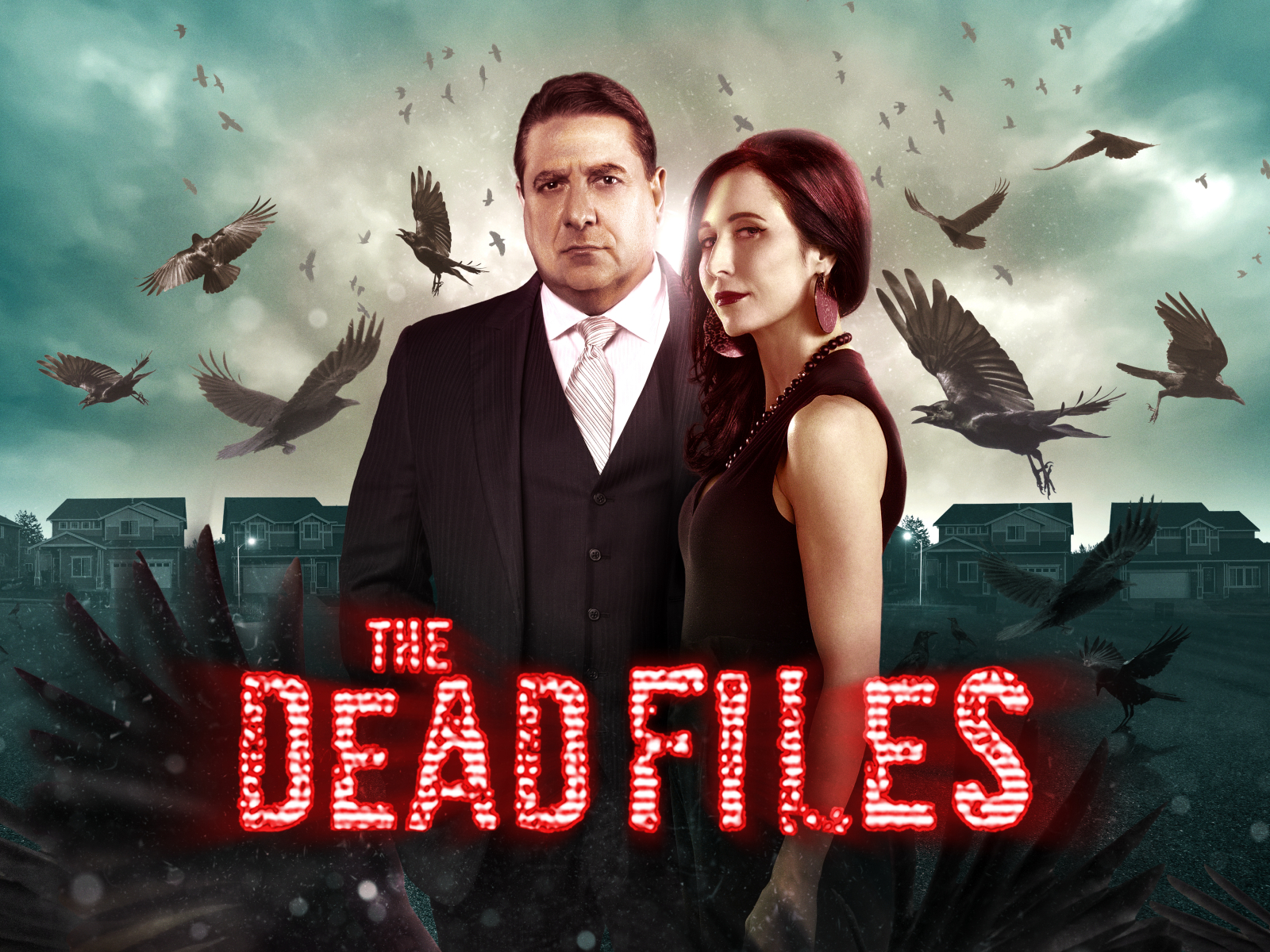
- Genre: Paranormal; Documentary
- Starring: Amy Allan; Steve Dischiavi; Matthew Anderson; Cindy Kaza
- Country of origin: United States
- Original language: English
- No. of seasons: 15
- No. of episodes: 244 (list of episodes)

Production
- Executive producers: Jim Casey; Rob Rosen; Ross Kaiman
- Producers: Joseph Bradley; Desma Simon; Angela Root; Brian Kniffel; Rob Mancini
- Cinematography: Rob Toth
- Editors: Jason Kothmann; Stephen Carr
- Camera setup: Multiple
- Running time: 60 minutes
- Production companies: Painless Entertainment, Inc.

Original release
- Network: Travel Channel
- Release: September 23, 2011 – October 19, 2023

The Dead Files is an American documentary paranormal television series that premiered on September 23, 2011, on the Travel Channel. The program features physical mediums Amy Allan (until 2023), Cindy Kaza (since 2023), and former NYPD homicide detective Steve DiSchiavi, who investigate allegedly haunted locations at the request of their clients to provide proof of paranormal activity. Each partner is depicted exploring the case independently of the other, not to influence their portion of the investigation. They, along with their client(s), come together during the program's final segment, the "reveal", when they compare their findings.

On April 21, 2023, it was announced that the fifteenth season will premiere on June 1, 2023. In the same press release, it was announced that Allan was leaving the series after the June 29 episode. She was replaced by medium Cindy Kaza.

== Cast ==
- Steve DiSchiavi: Investigator (2011–23)
- Cindy Kaza: Psychic medium (2023)
- Matthew Anderson: Videographer (2011–23)
- Amy Allan: Psychic medium (2011–23)

== Show format ==
Following her predecessor's (Amy Allan) guidance, Cindy Kaza continues her legacy alongside her partner, Steve DiSchiavi.

After items such as family pictures, trinkets, or personal effects have been removed from a location claimed to be haunted, Kaza walks through, attempting to communicate with ghosts and spirits. Meanwhile, Dischiavi questions residents, employees, and local experts in genealogy, local history, and law enforcement regarding the site's history. Later, Kaza collaborates with a sketch artist to create drawings of spirits she claims to have channeled during her walk-through. The episodes conclude with a "reveal", where the drawings will often appear to match Dischiavi's findings.

== Criticism ==
According to skeptical reviewer Karen Stollznow, Allan often claims to find the same activity, such as shadow people, in multiple locations. Some items – such as religious iconography – are not removed but are often left in locations. Stollznow notes that Allan appears to offer no evidence to verify her suggestion she had no preexisting knowledge of a location, which could be problematic for well-known ones such as Alcatraz or the Lizzie Borden house. Stollznow characterizes DiSchiavi as more of a "biased believer" than a skeptic and suggests that the show is edited to make his investigation appear accurate, removing parts of Allan's observations that don't align with DiSchiavi's findings.

== Episodes ==
Season	Episodes	Originally released	
Season	Episodes	First released	Last released
1	8	September 23, 2011	November 11, 2011
2	14	March 9, 2012	July 20, 2012
3	36	August 10, 2012	August 2, 2013
4	15	November 1, 2013	January 31, 2014
5	21	June 12, 2014	January 3, 2015
6	22	April 25, 2015	January 2, 2016
7	19	April 2, 2016	September 17, 2016
8	20	February 4, 2017	September 16, 2017
9	13	February 3, 2018	June 8, 2018
10	13	June 15, 2018	September 7, 2018
11	13	July 11, 2019	October 3, 2019
12	13	December 3, 2019	April 23, 2020
13	13	January 4, 2021	March 15, 2021
14	12	October 23, 2021	April 2, 2022
15	13	June 1, 2023	October 19, 2023

== See also ==
- Apparitional experience
- Parapsychology
- Ghost hunting
- Haunted locations in the United States
