= Leslie, Michigan =

- City
- City of Leslie
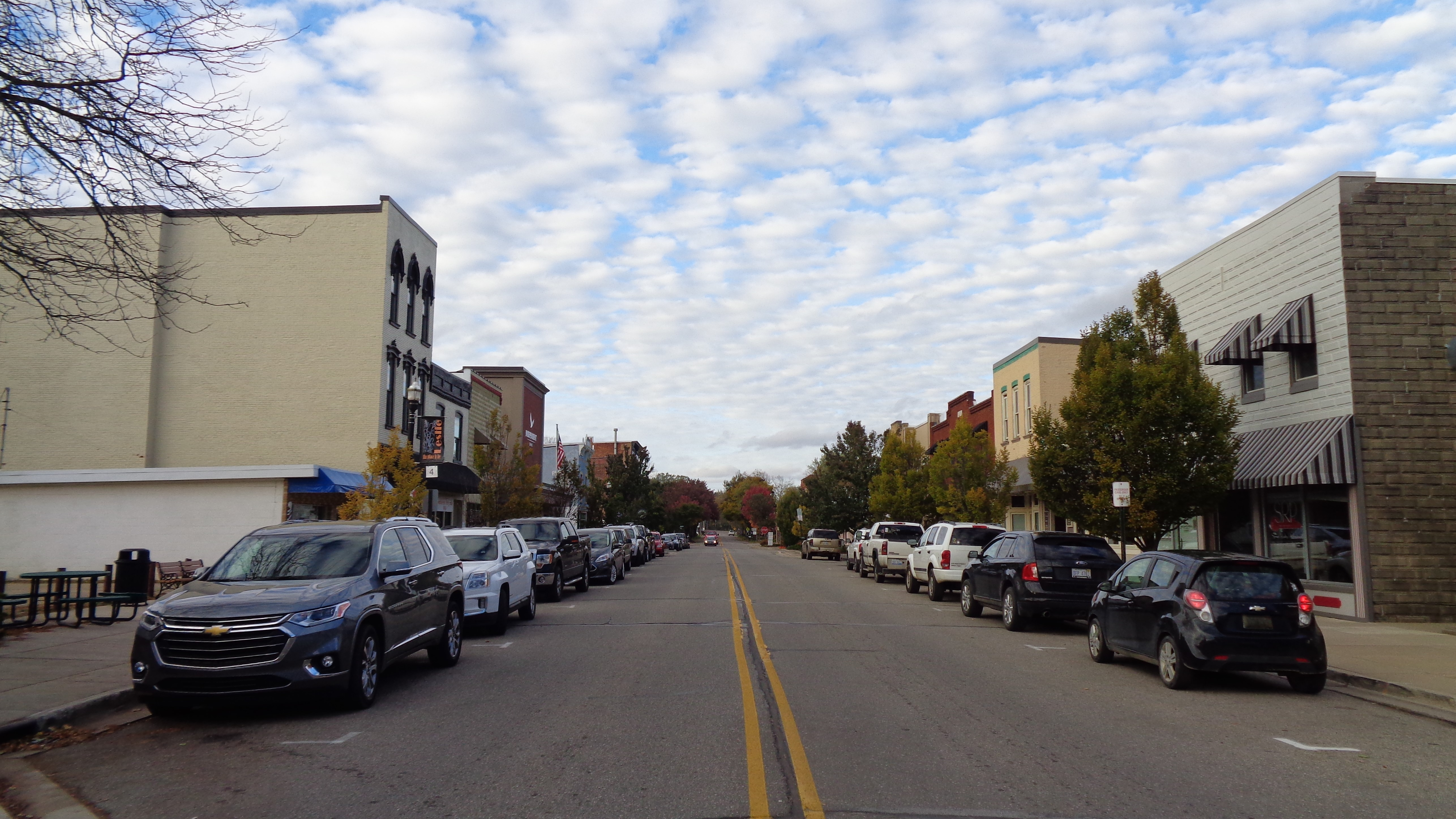
- Looking north along South Main Street

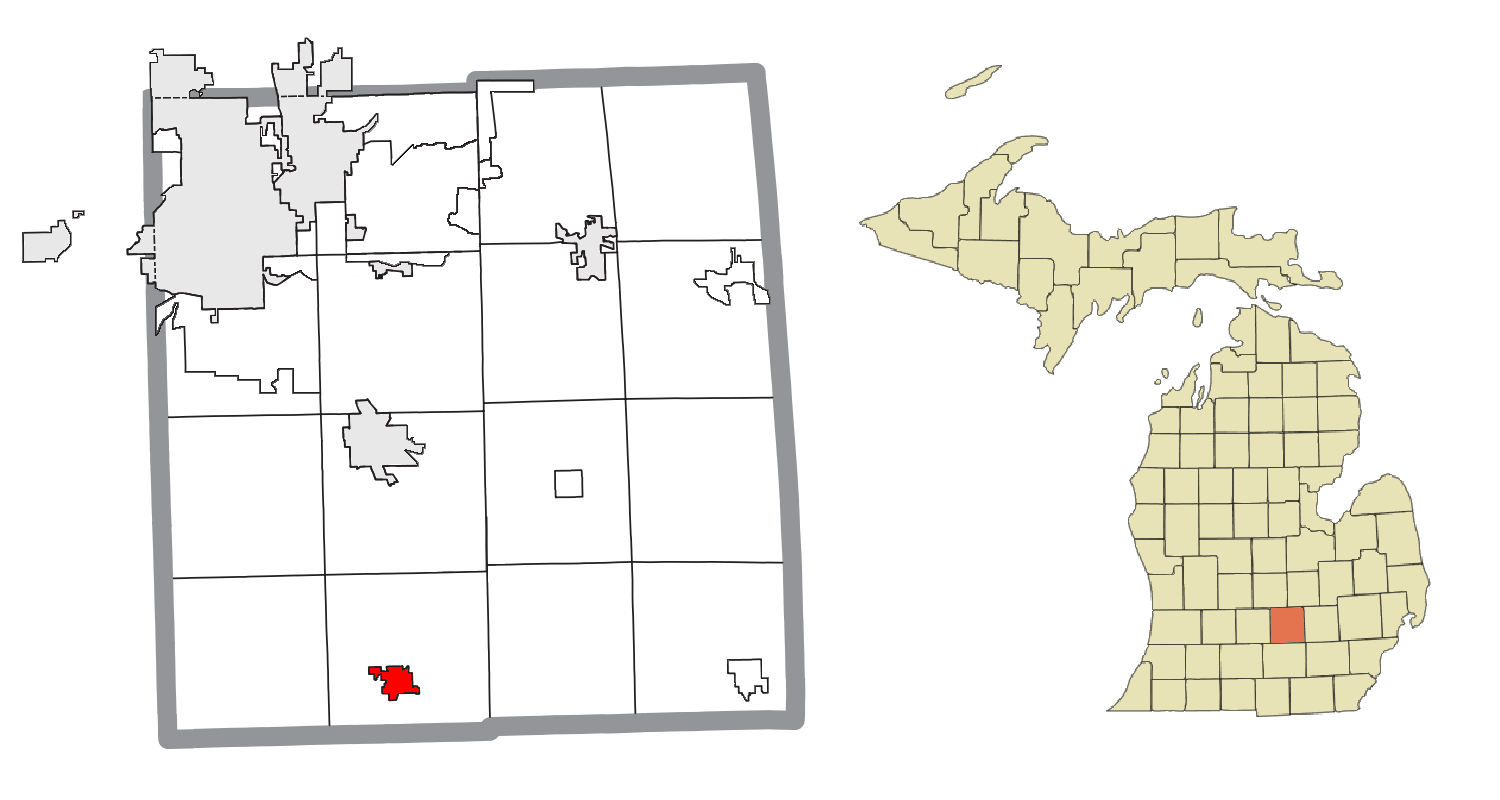
- Location within Ingham County

- Location within the state of Michigan Leslie (the United States)
- Coordinates: 42°27′02″N 84°25′59″W
- Country: United States
- State: Michigan
- County: Ingham
- Settled: 1836
- Incorporated: 1869 (village); 1968 (city)

Government
  - Type: Mayor–council
  - Mayor: Matthew Johnson
  - Mayor pro tem: Pam Beegle
  - Clerk: Chelsea Cox
  - Manager: Susan Montenegro

Area
  - Total: 1.29 sq mi (3.33 km^{2})
  - Land: 1.28 sq mi (3.32 km^{2})
  - Water: 0 sq mi (0.00 km^{2})
- Elevation: 935 ft (285 m)

Population (2020)
  - Total: 1,927
  - Density: 1,501.6/sq mi (579.76/km^{2})
- Time zone: UTC-5 (Eastern (EST))
  - Summer (DST): UTC-4 (EDT)
- ZIP code(s): 49251
- Area code: 517
- FIPS code: 26-47180
- GNIS feature ID: 1626610
- Website: Official website

Leslie is a city in Ingham County in the U.S. state of Michigan. The population was 2,167 at the 2020 census. The city is surrounded by Leslie Township, but the two are administered autonomously.

== Geography ==
The city of Leslie lies just east of US 127 in Ingham County on gently rolling hills. The city is located 28 miles (45 km) directly south of Lansing, and 17 miles (27 km) directly north of Jackson. Leslie is also near Meridian-Baseline State Park.

Numerous creeks flow through the city. Huntoon Creek, draining out from Huntoon Lake off of East Kinneville carves its way through downtown Leslie and by the City Little League Baseball fields.

According to the United States Census Bureau, the city has a total area of 1.29 square miles (3.34 km^{2}), all land.

== History ==
Leslie was first settled by Elijah Woodworth in 1836, who built the first log cabin in the city. It was originally named Meekerville after a pioneer to the area, Benjamin Meeker. Jerry G. Cornell named the town after a prominent Leslie family in eastern New York, his home state. The name Leslie was adopted officially when a post office was assigned to the area in 1841. Leslie was later incorporated as a village in 1869, and as a city nearly 100 years later in 1968.

== Education ==
The Leslie Public Schools is a small, rural district that educates nearly 1,400 students. The new Leslie High School was built in 1996 at 4141 Hull Road, and upgraded the old high school building into the middle school. The old middle school on Woodworth street (which was once a high school) was about 100 years old, was abandoned in 2005, and later demolished in 2023. The school district's mascot is the Leslie Blackhawk and the school colors are orange and black. Leslie's one public school has an average graduating class of between 100 and 130 students.

There are currently 4 Physical schools in Leslie: Woodworth Elementary school, Leslie Middle school, Leslie High School, and the Leslie Learning center (Formerly white pine academy).

Also located in Leslie is White Pine Academy, a public school academy that is charted by Saginaw Valley State University White Pine Academy was founded in 1999 by a group of local parents looking for a back-to-basics curriculum and small class sizes. In 2005, White Pine Academy built a new facility at 510 Russell Street. As of June 30, 2023 White pine academy ceased operations, and there are no plans to reopen. White pine academy's building was purchased by Leslie public schools in 2023.

=== Sports ===
Varsity sports offered at Leslie include basketball, baseball, football, golf, tennis, cross country, track, soccer and wrestling for the boys and basketball, softball, cheerleading, golf, tennis, cross country, track, soccer and volleyball for the girls.

In 2008 the Leslie Blackhawks football team played for the Division VI state championship at Ford Field, but fell short to the Montague Wildcats, 41–20.

Distance running has been prominent in Leslie. An annual road race is held in mid-August during the annual Blackhawk Festival at the high school. It runs through the outskirts of the city and finishes on the track. Leslie High School's men's cross country running teams have won 14 consecutive conference championships (1990–2003) and one Class C state championship (1993).

=== Robotics ===
In 2020 a High school Calculus teacher was approached by a FIRST robotics coach from another district at a quiz bowl event and offered to help start a team, that year 6 students built a 'somewhat functional robot' during AP Calculus according to a team member at the time.

Until the 2022 school year the Robotics team operated out of a small room at Leslie High School, In the summer of 2022 they cleaned out a former work a former workshop room at Leslie Middle School. When tech ed left the middle school offerings, it became a storage room for 20 years. They were able to clean it out and turn it back into a tech education space where it could be used to teach hands on skills. It is now in currently operational as the robotics room for the 8374 FRC team Bongo Bots, and the 21491 FTC team Bongo Bytes, along with several FLL and FLL challenge teams.

== Demographics ==
Historical population
Census	Pop.	Note	%±
1880	1,113		—
1890	1,058		−4.9%
1900	1,114		5.3%
1910	1,032		−7.4%
1920	1,089		5.5%
1930	1,105		1.5%
1940	1,281		15.9%
1950	1,543		20.5%
1960	1,807		17.1%
1970	1,894		4.8%
1980	2,110		11.4%
1990	1,872		−11.3%
2000	2,044		9.2%
2010	1,851		−9.4%
2020	1,927		4.1%
U.S. Decennial Census

=== 2020 census ===
As of the 2020 census, Leslie had a population of 1,927. The median age was 34.1 years. 24.8% of residents were under the age of 18 and 13.1% of residents were 65 years of age or older. For every 100 females there were 93.3 males, and for every 100 females age 18 and over there were 90.5 males age 18 and over.

0.0% of residents lived in urban areas, while 100.0% lived in rural areas.

There were 753 households in Leslie, of which 34.7% had children under the age of 18 living in them. Of all households, 41.7% were married-couple households, 16.6% were households with a male householder and no spouse or partner present, and 30.5% were households with a female householder and no spouse or partner present. About 25.2% of all households were made up of individuals and 9.5% had someone living alone who was 65 years of age or older.

There were 823 housing units, of which 8.5% were vacant. The homeowner vacancy rate was 2.9% and the rental vacancy rate was 9.5%.

Racial composition as of the 2020 census
Race	Number	Percent
White	1,741	90.3%
Black or African American	9	0.5%
American Indian and Alaska Native	8	0.4%
Asian	12	0.6%
Native Hawaiian and Other Pacific Islander	0	0.0%
Some other race	31	1.6%
Two or more races	126	6.5%
Hispanic or Latino (of any race)	99	5.1%

=== 2010 census ===
As of the census of 2010, there were 1,851 people, 690 households, and 490 families residing in the city. The population density was 1,434.9 inhabitants per square mile (554.0/km^{2}). There were 803 housing units at an average density of 622.5 per square mile (240.3/km^{2}). The racial makeup of the city was 96.5% White, 0.9% African American, 0.3% Native American, 0.5% Asian, 0.2% from other races, and 1.5% from two or more races. Hispanic or Latino people of any race were 2.6% of the population.

There were 690 households, of which 38.1% had children under the age of 18 living with them, 50.3% were married couples living together, 13.5% had a female householder with no husband present, 7.2% had a male householder with no wife present, and 29.0% were non-families. 23.3% of all households were made up of individuals, and 7.7% had someone living alone who was 65 years of age or older. The average household size was 2.64 and the average family size was 3.08.

The median age in the city was 35.7 years. 28.5% of residents were under the age of 18; 7% were between the ages of 18 and 24; 28.8% were from 25 to 44; 26.1% were from 45 to 64; and 9.7% were 65 years of age or older. The gender makeup of the city was 49.3% male and 50.7% female.

=== 2000 census ===
As of the census of 2000, there were 2,044 people, 734 households, and 518 families residing in the city. The population density was 1,535.6 inhabitants per square mile (592.9/km^{2}). There were 783 housing units at an average density of 588.3 per square mile (227.1/km^{2}). The racial makeup of the city was 96.04% White, 0.39% African American, 0.29% Native American, 0.68% Asian, 0.05% Pacific Islander, 0.98% from other races, and 1.57% from two or more races. Hispanic or Latino people of any race were 3.38% of the population.

There were 734 households, out of which 39.8% had children under the age of 18 living with them, 52.3% were married couples living together, 12.9% had a female householder with no husband present, and 29.4% were non-families. 24.5% of all households were made up of individuals, and 9.8% had someone living alone who was 65 years of age or older. The average household size was 2.76 and the average family size was 3.31.

In the city, the population was spread out, with 31.4% under the age of 18, 9.1% from 18 to 24, 31.4% from 25 to 44, 19.4% from 45 to 64, and 8.6% who were 65 years of age or older. The median age was 32 years. For every 100 females, there were 94.1 males. For every 100 females age 18 and over, there were 93.4 males.

The median income for a household in the city was $42,700, and the median income for a family was $48,162. Males had a median income of $36,771 versus $22,600 for females. The per capita income for the city was $18,124. About 4.9% of families and 7.5% of the population were below the poverty line, including 8.7% of those under age 18 and 4.9% of those age 65 or over.

== Notable residents ==
- Voltairine de Cleyre, anarchist, writer, and feminist; born in Leslie
- Holling Clancy Holling, children's author and illustrator of Paddle to the Sea and Pagoo; graduated from Leslie High School in 1917
- Arthur J. Tuttle, former U.S. District Judge; born in Leslie
- Frank L. White, believed to be the model for the chef on Cream of Wheat boxes; buried in Leslie at Woodlawn Cemetery
