= St. Johns Public Schools =

School district in Michigan

Address
- 501 W. Sickles St. Johns, Clinton, Michigan, 48879; United States

District information
- Grades: Pre-Kindergarten-12
- Superintendent: Anthony Berthiaume
- Schools: 7
- Budget: $38,259,000 2021-2022 expenditures
- NCES District ID: 2632820

Students and staff
- Students: 2,458 (2024-2025)
- Teachers: 142.83 (on an FTE basis) (2024-2025)
- Staff: 335.28 FTE (2024-2025)
- Student–teacher ratio: 17.21 (2024-2025)

Other information
- Website: www.sjredwings.org

St. Johns Public Schools is a public school district in Michigan. In Clinton County, it serves St. Johns, Bingham Township, and parts of the townships of Bengal, Essex, Greenbush, Duplain, Olive, Ovid, Riley, Victor, and Watertown. It also serves parts of the townships of Elba, Fulton, and Washington in Gratiot County.

== History ==
In 1857, a school district was founded in St. Johns. The block bordered by Baldwin, Church, Park and Ottawa Streets was used for a school. The district re-organized in 1862 and built their second building, a union school, on this site in 1864. The East Ward school was built in 1876 at 106 North Traver Street, and still existed in 1980, when it was listed on the National Register of Historic Places.

By 1879, the Union School was graduating high school students, with seven graduating that year. The Union School burned on March 22, 1885 and was rebuilt that year. It was also known as Central School.

As of 1916, the high school was a member of the North Central Association of Secondary Schools and Colleges, and according to the newspaper in nearby Belding, graduates could "enter any college without an examination, with the exception of possibly one or two colleges in the New England states. In order to be a member of this association, the school must have a high standard of work; its teachers must have college degrees; no teacher must be over-burdened with too many classes; every teacher must have professional training besides his academic training; and the building must be well supplied with equipment and have good sanitary conditions."

St. Johns High School was formerly known as Rodney B. Wilson High School, built in 1925 at 101 West Cass Street. The parents of Rodney B. Wilson, a student who died in the 1918 flu pandemic, donated land for the school. It became a middle school in 1969. When the current middle school, designed by Fanning/Howey and Associates, opened in fall 1998, the Wilson building was used as offices for several community groups. A renovation of the building was planned in 2025.

The current high school opened in fall 1969. Guido A. Binda was the architect.

In April 1970, Belizean Premier George Cadle Price gave a speech at the high school. St. Johns in the sister city of Stann Creek District in Belize.

After it ended extra curricular activities and busing, citizens questioned the school board for its spending decisions and financial management. In April 1986, six school board members were recalled. In the midst of this controversy, the 1885 Central School was ordered closed by the state fire marshal.

== Schools ==
Schools in St. Johns Public Schools district
School	Address	Notes
St. Johns High School	501 W. Sickles, St. Johns	Grades 9–12. Opened 1969.
St. Johns Middle School	900 W. Townsend, St. Johns	Grades 6–8. Opened 1998.
Eureka Elementary	7550 N. Welling Rd., St. Johns	Grades PreK-5
Gateway North Elementary	915 North Lansing Street, St. Johns	Grades PreK-5
Oakview South Elementary	1400 South Clinton, St. Johns	Grades PreK-5
Riley Elementary	5935 W Pratt Rd., DeWitt	Grades PreK-5
S.T.R.I.V.E. Academy	1013 Old U.S. 127, St. Johns	Grades 9–12. Alternative high school/online school.
