= Laingsburg Community Schools =

School district in Michigan, United States

Address
- 205 S. Woodhull Road Laingsburg, Shiawassee, Michigan, 48848; United States

District information
- Grades: PreKindergarten–12
- Superintendent: Matt Shastal
- Schools: 3
- Budget: $17,315,000 2022-2023 expenditures
- NCES District ID: 2620550

Students and staff
- Students: 1,112 (2024-2025)
- Teachers: 70.51 (on an FTE basis) (2024-2025)
- Staff: 148.23 FTE (2024-2025)
- Student–teacher ratio: 15.77 (2024-2025)

Other information
- Website: www.laingsburg.k12.mi.us

Laingsburg Community Schools is a public school district in Central Michigan. In Shiawassee County, it serves Laingsburg and parts of the townships of Bennington, Sciota, and Woodhull. In Clinton County, it serves parts of the townships of Bath and Victor.

== History ==
The former high school opened around 1963 as an addition to a school built in 1890. Laingsburg Elementary was dedicated on November 6, 1960.

In spring 1957, the district was in turmoil and required the involvement of the state government. Accused of giving "undue attention" to a group of girls, commercial teacher Don Fockler was investigated by the Michigan Education Association, which cleared him of wrongdoing, and found him to have been retaliated against for giving bad grades. The school board voted three to two to fire him, and Superintendent Keith W. Reed as well, accusing that Reed "refused to assist the board in matters pertaining to the welfare of the school," and that there was "confusion, lack of discipline and civil disorder" at the high school. On April 23, 1957, dozens of students boycotted class and about twenty students drove to Lansing, where they met with Lieutenant Governor Philip Hart to demand intervention. Meanwhile, recall petitions were being circulated against one of the school board members, Robert Tisch. When Tisch was recalled, two other board members resigned, and the board could no longer operate without a quorum. In May, Governor G. Mennen Williams appointed a school board member so that the district could continue conducting business. The board then restored the jobs of Fockler and Reed. The school yearbook that spring was dedicated to Fockler.

The current Laingsburg High School opened in fall 1993. The former high school, at 320 East Grand River, became the district's middle school. A bond issue passed in 2001 to convert part of it into an Early Childhood Center and rebuild the middle school on the same site. The new middle school was dedicated on August 24, 2003.

An approximately $18 million bond issue funded improvements to district facilities in 2019.

== Schools ==
Schools in Laingsburg Community Schools district
School	Address	Notes
Laingsburg High School	8008 Woodbury Rd., Laingsburg	Grades 9-12. Built 1993.
Laingsburg Middle School	112 High Street, Laingsburg	Grades 6-8. Built 2003.
Laingsburg Elementary	117 Prospect St., Laingsburg	Grades K-5. Built 1960.
Early Childhood Center	320 E. Grand River, Laingsburg	Preschool
