= Pewamo-Westphalia Community Schools =

School district in Michigan

Address
- 5101 Clintonia Road Westphalia, Clinton County, Michigan, 48041; United States
- Coordinates: 42°56′35″N 84°50′11″W

District information
- Grades: PreKindergarten–12
- Superintendent: Dick Dunham
- Schools: 2
- Budget: $11,387,000 2022-2023 expenditures
- NCES District ID: 2627960

Students and staff
- Students: 753 (2024-2025)
- Teachers: 40.88 (on an FTE basis) (2024-2025)
- Staff: 96.06 FTE (2024-2025)
- Student–teacher ratio: 18.42 (2024-2025)
- Colors: Blue and gold

Other information
- Website: www.pwschools.org

Pewamo-Westphalia Community Schools is a public school district in the Greater Lansing, Michigan area. In Clinton County, it serves Westphalia and parts of the townships of Bengal, Dallas, Eagle, Lebanon, Westphalia, and Riley. In Ionia County, it serves Pewamo and parts of the townships of Lyons, North Plains, and Portland Township, Michigan.

== History ==
Pewamo’s school district, then independent, consolidated with several outlying districts in 1941 and later merged with Westphalia’s district in 1959. Westphalia's previous school, built in 1903, was a stone building with a central cupola, and it contained all grades in the district.

The merged district undertook a building program to create a new middle/high school between the two towns. Louis C. Kingscott and Associates of Kalamazoo was the architect. The new school opened in fall 1961 and the old Pewamo school was demolished. The school was dedicated on November 26, 1961.

Bond issues to expand and renovate district facilities passed in 1997, 2002, 2013, and 2023. A new high school gymnasium was built in 2003.

== Schools ==
Schools in Pewamo-Westphalia Community Schools
School	Address	Notes
Pewamo-Westphalia Middle/High School	5101 S. Clintonia Rd., Westphalia	Grades 6–12. Built 1961.
Pewamo-Westphalia Elementary	430 W. Jefferson St., Pewamo	Grades PreK-5
