= Little Maple River =

River in the United States of America

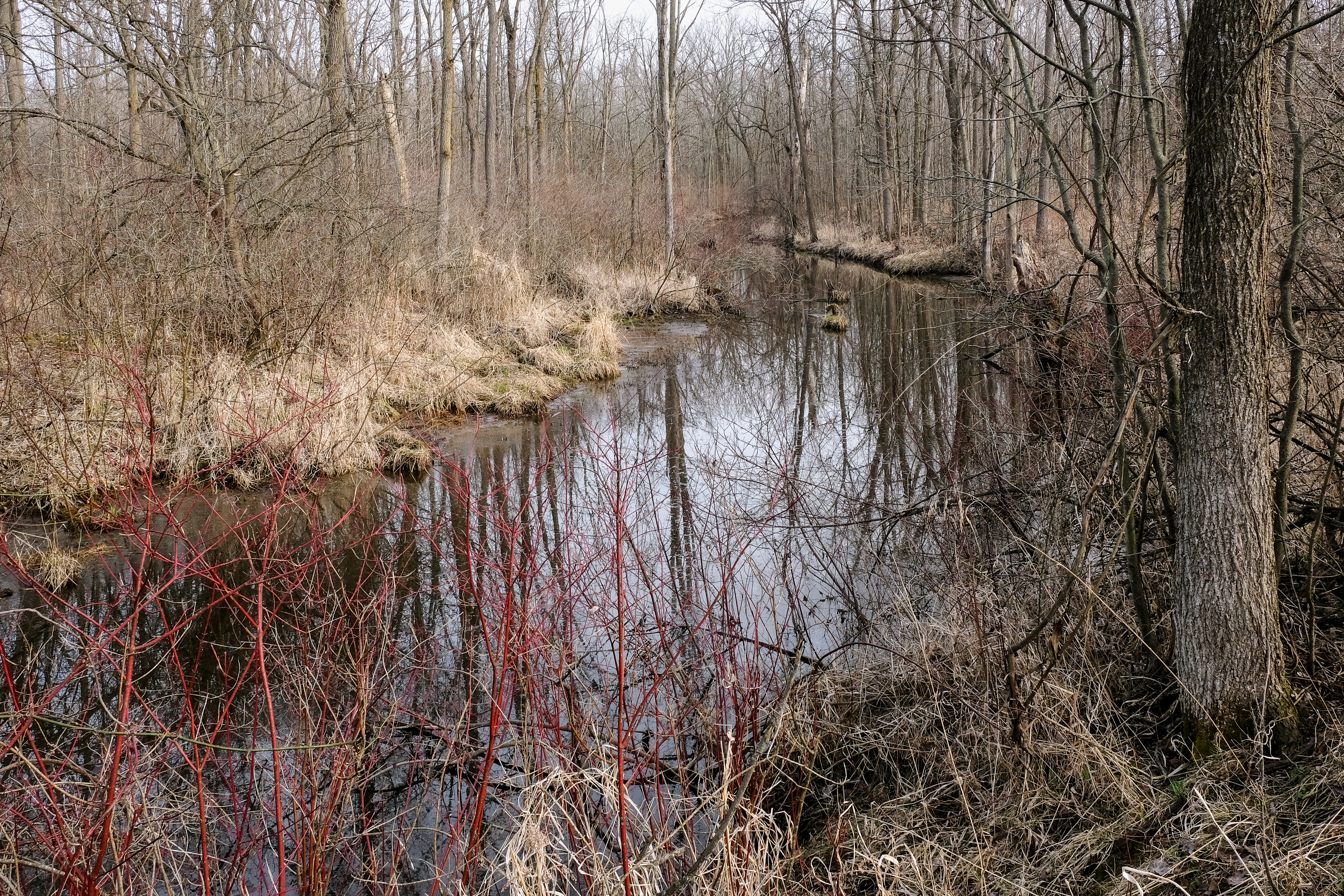

Location
- Country: United States
- State: Michigan
- County: Clinton

Physical characteristics
- Source
  - location: Victor Township, Clinton County, Michigan, United States
  - coordinates: 42°54′17″N 84°26′38″W
- Mouth: Maple River
  - location: Ovid Township, Clinton County, Michigan, United States
  - coordinates: 43°01′04″N 84°25′44″W
- Discharge
  - location: mouth
  - average: 22.59 cu ft/s (0.640 m^{3}/s) (estimate)

The Little Maple River is a 16.5-mile-long (26.6 km) tributary of the Maple River in the central part of the Lower Peninsula of the U.S. state of Michigan. It rises in Victor Township, Clinton County at the outlet of Cedar Lake. It flows through Sleepy Hollow State Park which surrounds Lake Ovid. Lake Ovid was created by damming the Little Maple River. The Little Maple River joins the Maple River in Ovid Township, Clinton County.
