= Sleepy Hollow State Park =

Park in Michigan, USA

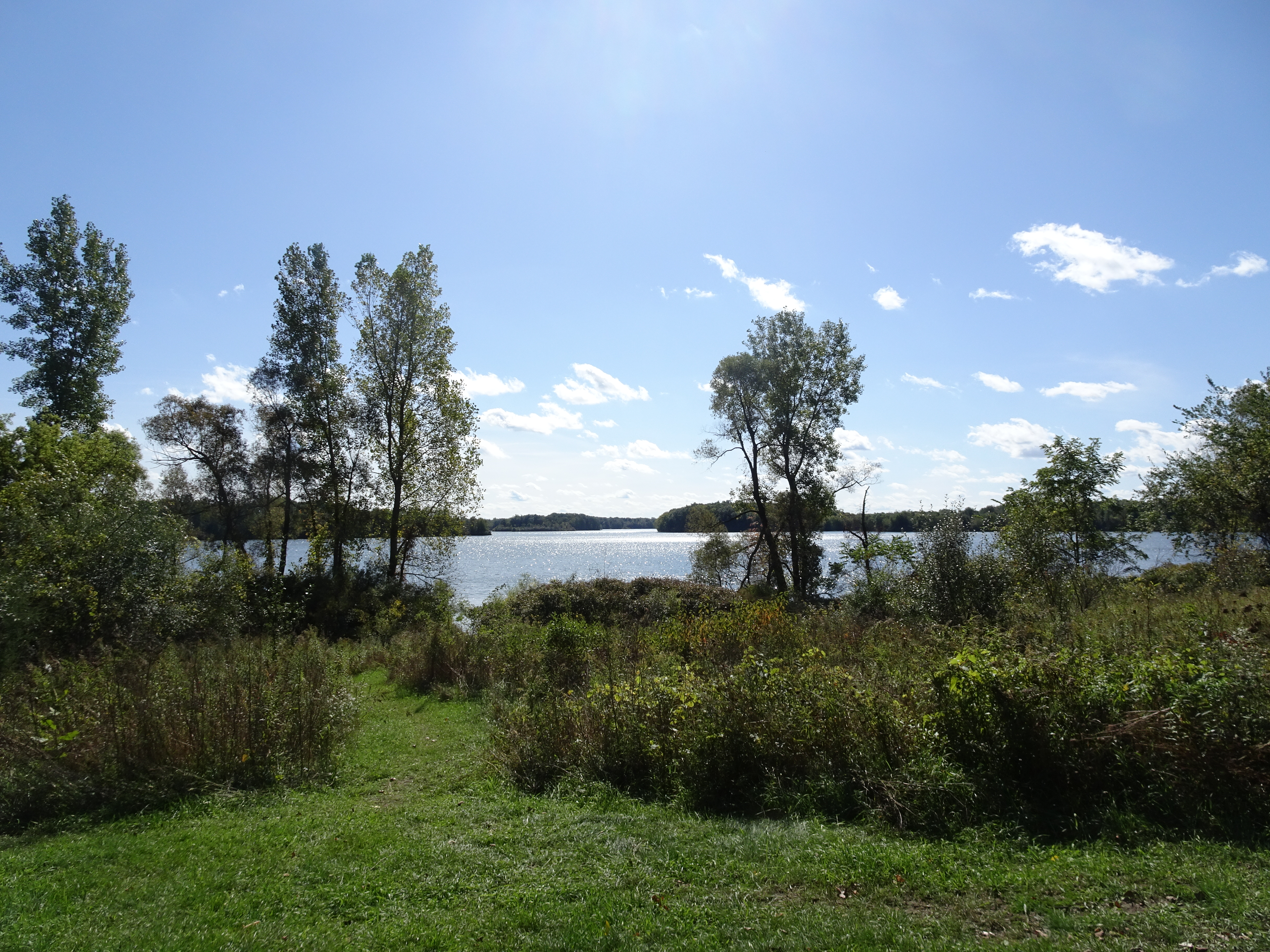

- Location within Michigan Location within the United States
- Location: Clinton County, Michigan, United States
- Nearest city: Laingsburg, Michigan
- Coordinates: 42°56′12″N 84°24′46″W
- Area: 2,678 acres (1,084 ha)
- Elevation: 781 feet (238 m)
- Established: 1965 (Opened 1976)
- Administrator: Michigan Department of Natural Resources
- Visitors: 332,276 (in 2012-2013)
- Designation: Michigan state park
- Website: Official website

Sleepy Hollow State Park is a public recreation area covering 2,678 acres (1,084 ha) in the townships of Ovid and Victor in Clinton County, Michigan. The state park is located off US-127 nine miles southeast of St. Johns and four miles northwest of Laingsburg and centers on man-made, 410-acre (170 ha) Lake Ovid.

== History ==
The park was created through a series of land acquisitions in the late 1960s followed by the damming the Little Maple River to create Lake Ovid. The state opened the park in 1976.

== Wildlife ==
At 410 acres (170 ha), Lake Ovid is the largest body of water in the surrounding area. The lake's fish species include black crappie, largemouth bass, muskellunge, sunfish, yellow perch, bluegill, northern pike, bowfin, brown bullhead, carp, white sucker, pumpkinseed, and yellow bullhead. The lake is stocked with muskellunge and channel catfish. Migrating waterfowl, shorebirds and passerines are drawn to Lake Ovid, and more than 228 bird species have been recorded in the park.

== Activities and amenities ==
The park's recreational features include swimming, boating and fishing on Lake Ovid (enforced as a "no wake" lake), 16 miles of trails for hiking, biking and cross-country skiing, twelve miles of equestrian trails, picnicking facilities, disc golf, and areas for hunting, snowmobiling, and camping.

== Gallery ==
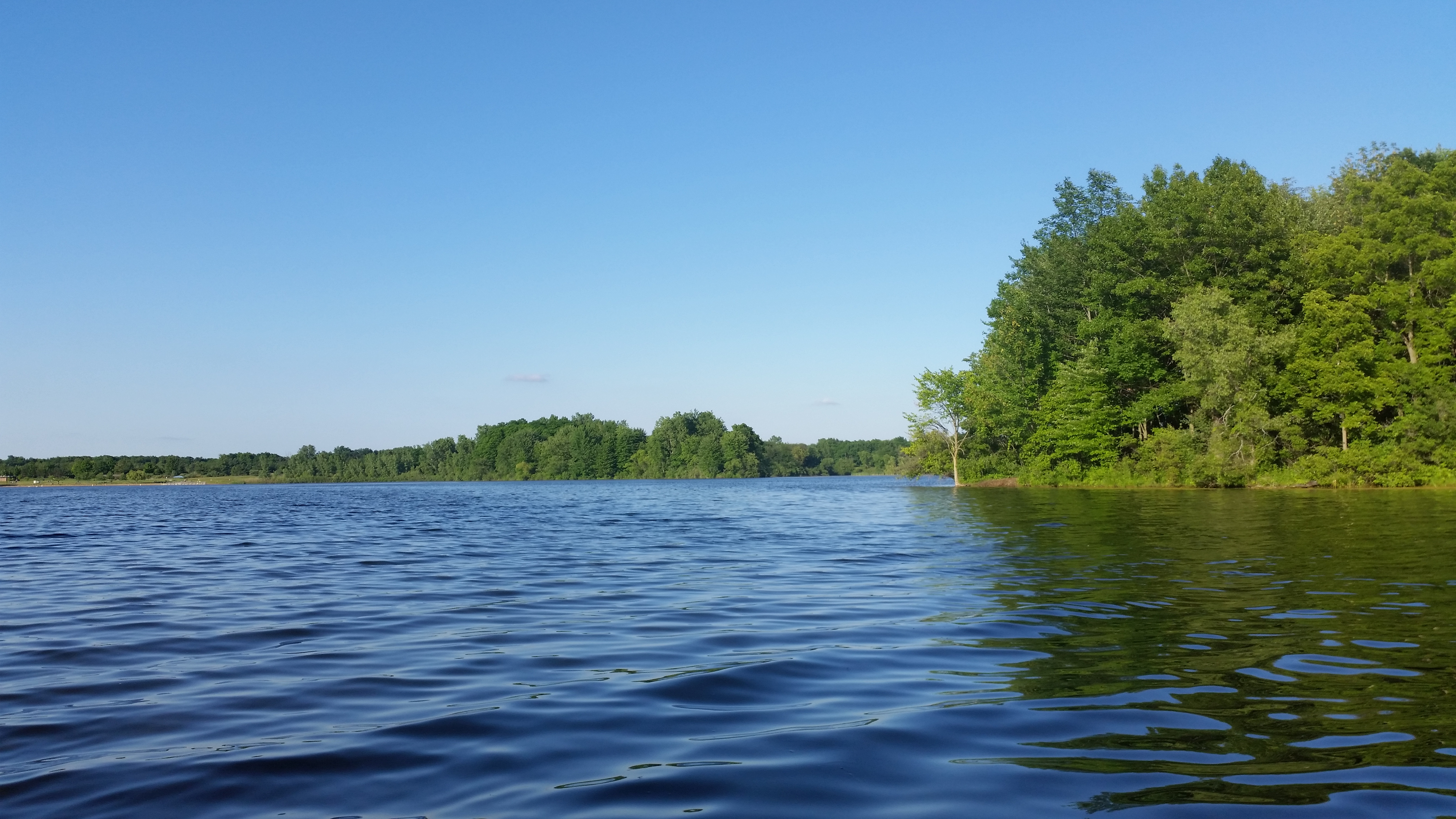
Lake Ovid is the principal feature of the state park.

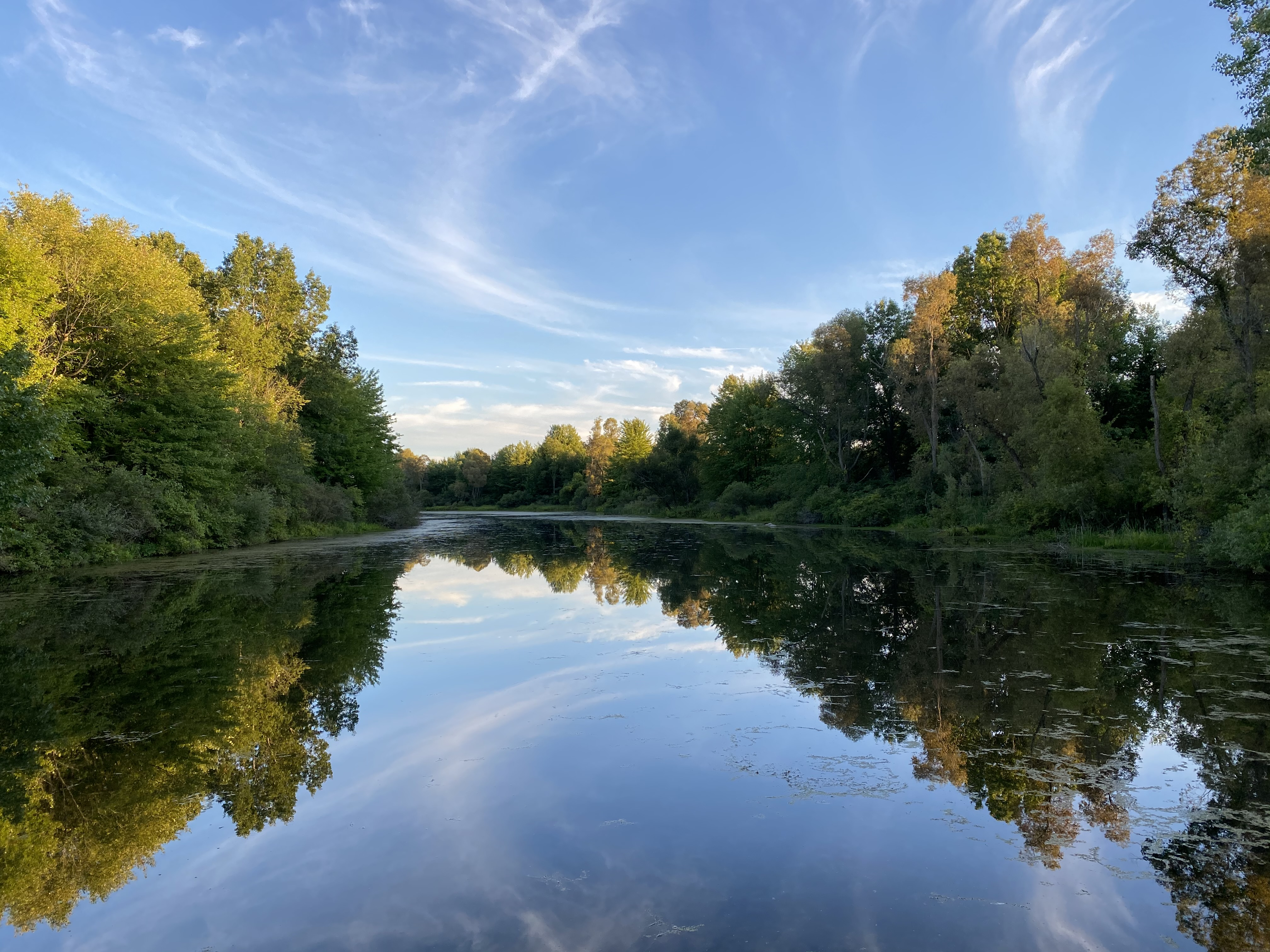
The lake contains several islands and channels.

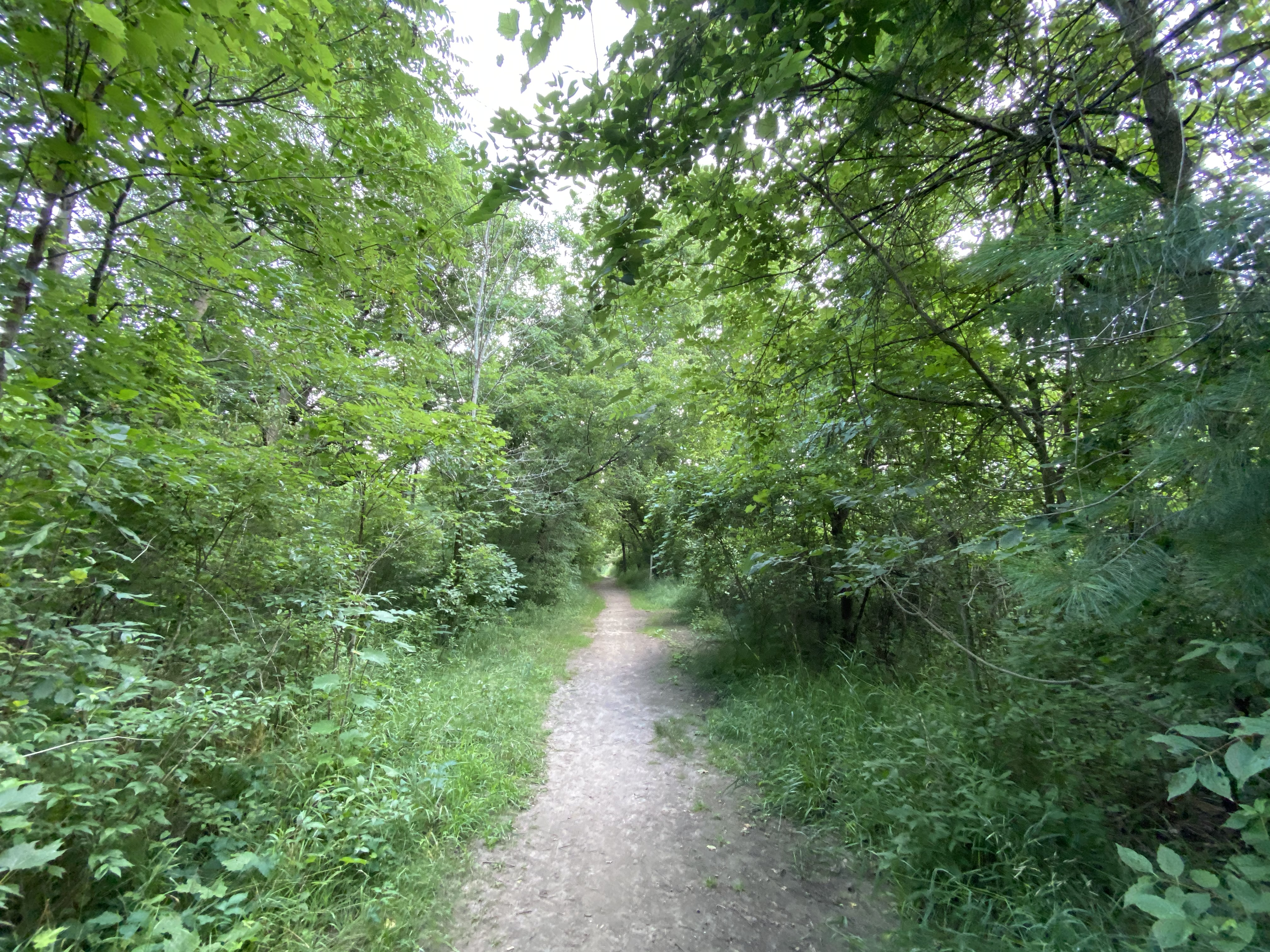
A hiking and horse trail runs along parts of the perimeter of the lake.
