= Lake Victoria, Michigan =

- Census-designated place (CDP) & unincorporated community
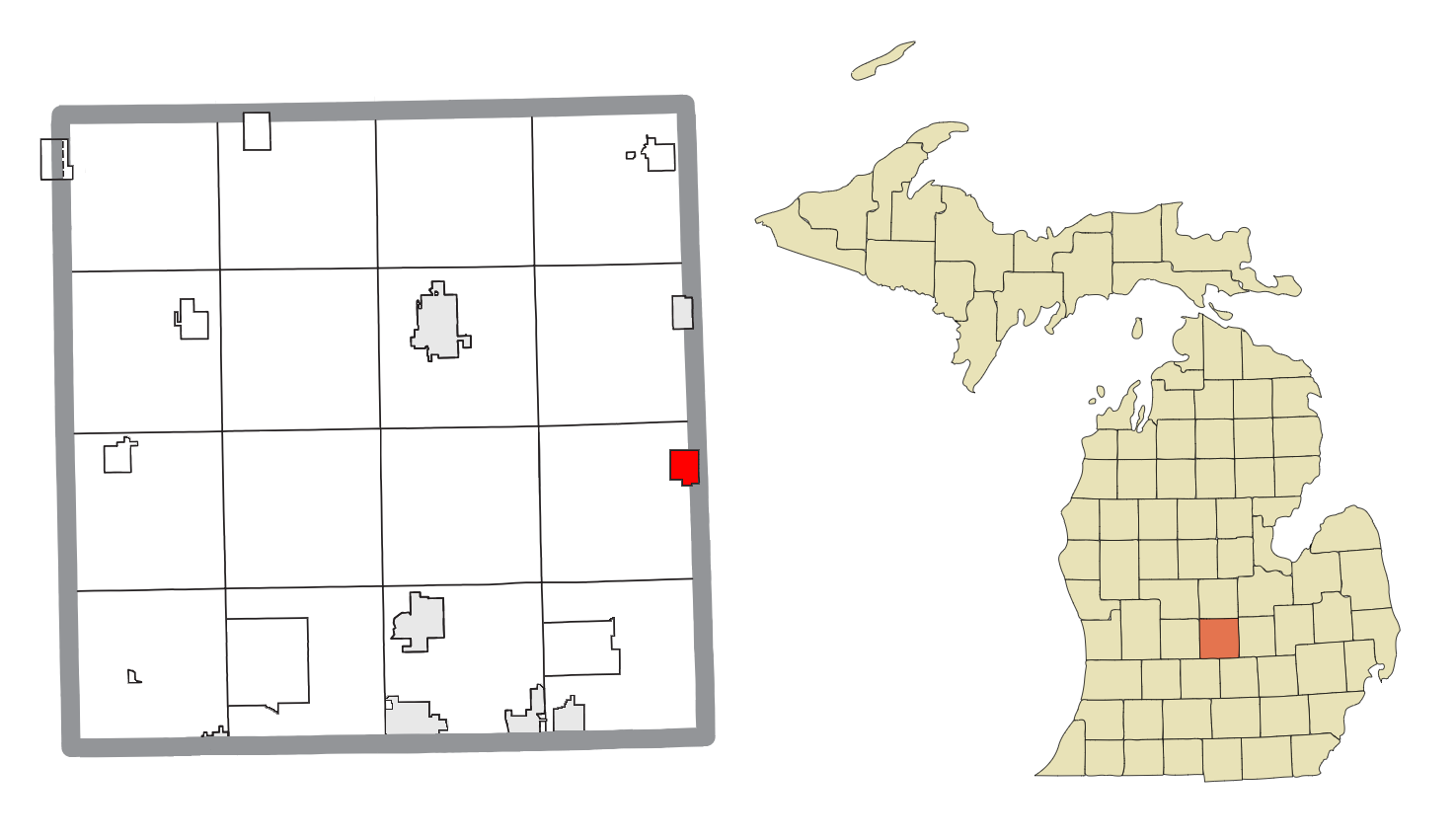
- Location within Clinton County

- Location within the state of Michigan Location within the United States
- Coordinates: 42°55′02″N 84°22′47″W
- Country: United States
- State: Michigan
- County: Clinton
- Township: Victor

Area
  - Total: 1.05 sq mi (2.72 km^{2})
  - Land: 0.82 sq mi (2.13 km^{2})
  - Water: 0.23 sq mi (0.59 km^{2})
- Elevation: 791 ft (241 m)

Population (2020)
  - Total: 984
  - Density: 1,196.7/sq mi (462.06/km^{2})
- Time zone: UTC-5 (Eastern (EST))
  - Summer (DST): UTC-4 (EDT)
- ZIP code(s): 48848 (Laingsburg)
- Area code: 517
- FIPS code: 26-45190
- GNIS feature ID: 2583748

Lake Victoria is an unincorporated community and census-designated place (CDP) in Clinton County in the U.S. state of Michigan. It is located in Victor Township. As of the 2020 census, Lake Victoria had a population of 984.

== History ==
The community of Victoria Lake was listed as a newly-organized census-designated place for the 2010 census, meaning it now has officially defined boundaries and population statistics for the first time.

== Geography ==
The Lake Victoria CDP has a total area of 1.05 square miles (2.72 km^{2}), of which 0.82 square miles (2.12 km^{2}) is land and 0.23 square miles (0.60 km^{2}) (21.9%) is water.

The Lake Victoria CDP consists of a residential development surrounding a lake of the same name in eastern Victor Township. The eastern edge of the CDP is the eastern border of the township (and county), with Sciota Township of Shiawassee County to the east.

== Demographics ==
Historical population
Census	Pop.	Note	%±
2020	984		—
U.S. Decennial Census
