= Ovid Township, Michigan =

Ovid Township is the name of some places in the U.S. state of Michigan:

- Ovid Township, Branch County, Michigan
- Ovid Township, Clinton County, Michigan

== See also ==
- Ovid, Michigan, a village in Clinton County
