= Pewamo-Westphalia High School =

Public high school in Westphalia, Michigan, United States

Location
- 5101 South Clintonia Road; Westphalia, Michigan 48894; United States; 42.9427°N 84.8364°W

Information
- Type: Public high school
- Motto: Onward Pirates!
- Established: September 1961
- School district: Pewamo-Westphalia Community Schools
- NCES School ID: 262796006378
- Principal: Todd Simmons
- Teaching staff: 24.55 (on an FTE basis)
- Grades: 6–12
- Enrollment: 477 (2023-2024)
- Student to teacher ratio: 19.43
- Colors: Blue and Gold
- Athletics conference: Central Michigan Athletic Conference
- Nickname: Pirates
- Website: www.pwschools.org/middle-high-school

Student assessments
- 2021–22 school year Change vs. prior year

M-STEP 11th grade proficiency rates (Science / Social Studies)
- Advanced %: 11.9 / 13.4
- Proficient %: 23.9 / 23.9
- PR. Proficient %: 25.4 / 44.8
- Not Proficient %: 38.8 / 17.9

Average test scores
- SAT Total: 1047.4 (▼ −6.3)

Pewamo-Westphalia High School is a public high school in Westphalia, Michigan, United States. It is part of the Pewamo-Westphalia Community Schools district and was established in September 1961.

== Academics ==
In 2019, Pewamo-Westphalia High School was ranked among the top 15 best high schools in Michigan by U.S. News & World Report, and 615th in the nation.

In 2017-2018, the school led Clinton County with the highest 11th grade M-STEP scores in science and social studies, had the highest average SAT score (1119.5) in the county, and ranked in the top 50 highest SAT scores in the state of Michigan (44th).

== Athletics ==
The Pewamo-Westphalia athletic teams are known as the Pirates and the school colors are blue and gold. The Pirates compete in the Central Michigan Athletic Conference. The following Michigan High School Athletic Association-sanctioned sports are offered at Pewamo-Westphalia High School:

- Baseball (boys)
- Basketball (girls and boys)
- Bowling (girls and boys)
- Competitive cheerleading (girls)
- Cross country (girls and boys)
- Football (boys)
- Golf (girls and boys)
- Track & field (girls and boys)
- Volleyball (girls)

On January 29, 2019, the Pirates were the subject of an article in the Lansing State Journal about the school's athletic success and its strong support from the community.
