= Westphalia, Michigan =

- Village
- Village of Westphalia
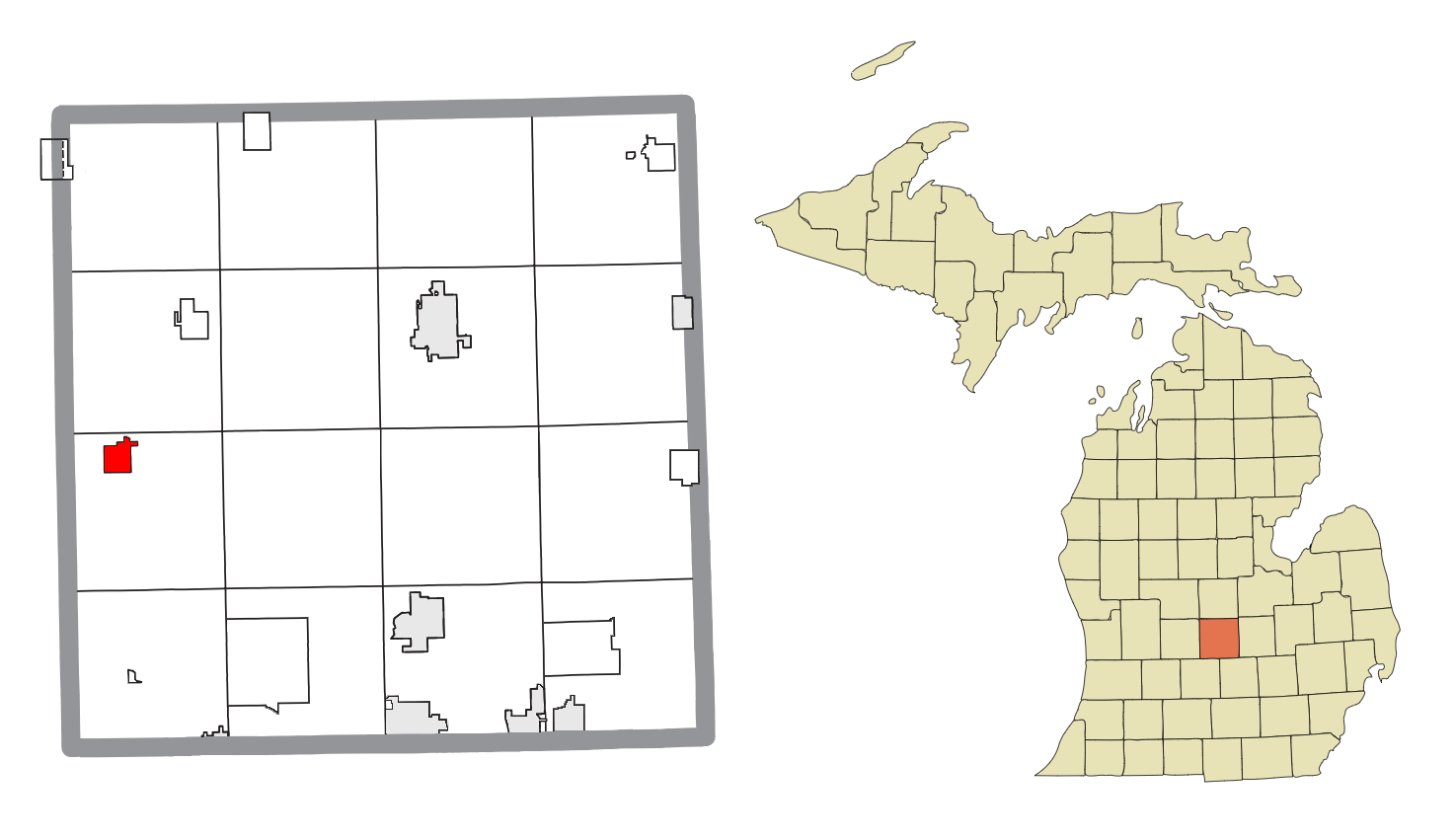
- Location within Clinton County

- Location within the state of Michigan Location within the United States
- Coordinates: 42°55′49″N 84°47′53″W
- Country: United States
- State: Michigan
- County: Clinton
- Township: Westphalia
- Founded: 1836
- Incorporated: 1883

Government
  - Type: Village council
  - President: Tim Fandel
  - Clerk: Dave Boswell

Area
  - Total: 1.14 sq mi (2.96 km^{2})
  - Land: 1.11 sq mi (2.88 km^{2})
  - Water: 0.031 sq mi (0.08 km^{2})
- Elevation: 758 ft (231 m)

Population (2020)
  - Total: 924
  - Density: 829.6/sq mi (320.31/km^{2})
- Time zone: UTC-5 (Eastern (EST))
  - Summer (DST): UTC-4 (EDT)
- ZIP code(s): 48894
- Area code: 989
- FIPS code: 26-86120
- GNIS feature ID: 2400156
- Website: Official website

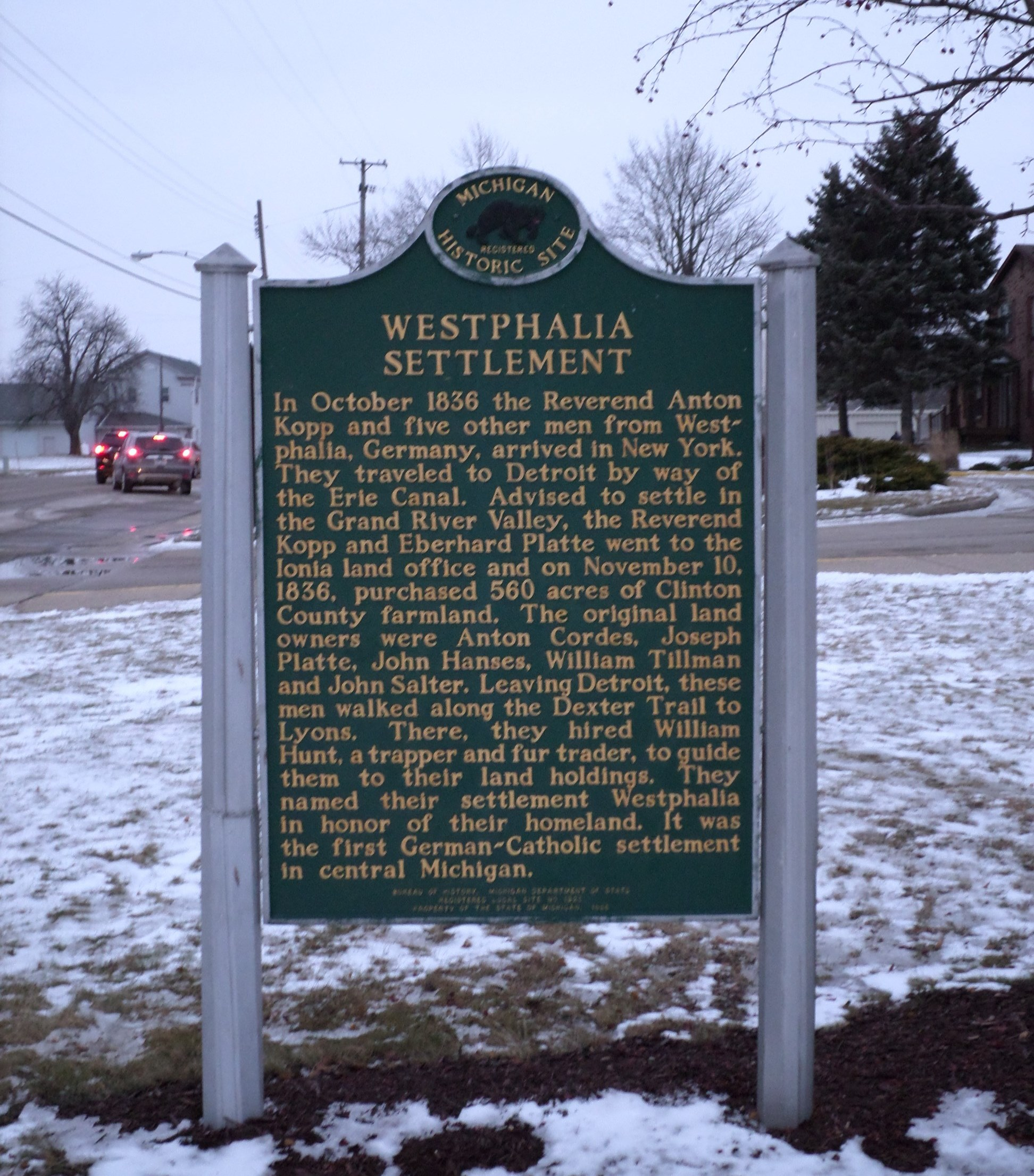
A Michigan State Historic Site plaque honoring Westphalia

Westphalia is a village in Clinton County in the U.S. state of Michigan. The population was 924 at the time of the 2020 census. The village is in Westphalia Township, about 25 miles (40.2 km) northwest of Lansing and 55 miles (88.5 km) east of Grand Rapids. The village is known for its German and Catholic roots.

== History ==
Westphalia was founded in 1836 by a group of German settlers. It was named after the province of Westphalia in Germany. These settlers were German Catholics who emigrated from the Westphalian cities of Wimbach, Meerhof, and from Hesse, among others, and found the rich soil ideal for farming. Some family members stayed in Detroit, while others moved into the wilderness to clear farmland. The German-Catholic parish was established almost immediately after the settlers arrived. After buying the land at Ionia, Father Anton Kopp traveled to Detroit to visit Bishop Friedrich Reese, and returned to his assigned parish in September 1837, where he celebrated Masses in the homes of the settlers in what is now St. Mary's Parish.

In 2012, the village celebrated its 175th anniversary.

== Geography ==
According to the United States Census Bureau, the village has a total area of 1.14 square miles (2.95 km^{2}), of which 1.11 square miles (2.87 km^{2}) is land and 0.03 square miles (0.08 km^{2}) (2.63%) is water.

== Demographics ==
Historical population
Census	Pop.	Note	%±
1890	350		—
1900	374		6.9%
1910	366		−2.1%
1920	325		−11.2%
1930	328		0.9%
1940	386		17.7%
1950	459		18.9%
1960	560		22.0%
1970	806		43.9%
1980	896		11.2%
1990	780		−12.9%
2000	876		12.3%
2010	923		5.4%
2020	924		0.1%
U.S. Decennial Census

=== 2010 census ===
As of the census of 2010, there were 923 people, 355 households, and 267 families residing in the village. The population density was 831.5 inhabitants per square mile (321.0/km^{2}). There were 364 housing units at an average density of 327.9 per square mile (126.6/km^{2}). The racial makeup of the village was 98.2% White, 0.1% African American, 0.1% Native American, 0.1% Asian, 1.0% from other races, and 0.5% from two or more races. Hispanic or Latino of any race were 3.0% of the population.

There were 355 households, of which 30.7% had children under the age of 18 living with them, 67.0% were married couples living together, 6.2% had a female householder with no husband present, 2.0% had a male householder with no wife present, and 24.8% were non-families. 22.3% of all households were made up of individuals, and 12.6% had someone living alone who was 65 years of age or older. The average household size was 2.60 and the average family size was 3.04.

The median age in the village was 39.4 years. 27.5% of residents were under the age of 18; 6.2% were between the ages of 18 and 24; 23.8% were from 25 to 44; 20.1% were from 45 to 64; and 22.4% were 65 years of age or older. The gender makeup of the village was 48.3% male and 51.7% female.

=== 2000 census ===
As of the census of 2000, there were 876 people, 342 households, and 251 families residing in the village. The population density was 765.7 inhabitants per square mile (295.6/km^{2}). There were 350 housing units at an average density of 305.9 per square mile (118.1/km^{2}). The racial makeup of the village was 99.43% White, 0.23% Native American, and 0.34% from two or more races.

There were 342 households, out of which 32.7% had children under the age of 18 living with them, 66.7% were married couples living together, 4.7% had a female householder with no husband present, and 26.6% were non-families. 24.9% of all households were made up of individuals, and 13.7% had someone living alone who was 65 years of age or older. The average household size was 2.56 and the average family size was 3.07.

In the village, the population was spread out, with 27.9% under the age of 18, 6.6% from 18 to 24, 26.6% from 25 to 44, 21.7% from 45 to 64, and 17.2% who were 65 years of age or older. The median age was 36 years. For every 100 females, there were 94.7 males. For every 100 females age 18 and over, there were 93.9 males.

The median income for a household in the village was $52,500, and the median income for a family was $58,864. Males had a median income of $40,781 versus $31,827 for females. The per capita income for the village was $20,112. There are 3.5% of families living below the poverty line and 4.2% of the population, including 4.3% of under eighteens and 9.0% of those over 64.

== Education ==
Westphalia is home to the following schools:

- St. Mary Catholic School (K-6)
- Pewamo-Westphalia Elementary School (K-5)
- Pewamo-Westphalia Middle/High School (6–12)

In 2019, Pewamo-Westphalia High School was ranked among the top 15 best high schools in Michigan by U.S. News & World Report, and 615th in the nation.

== Recreation ==
=== Westphalia Cruise-In ===
The Westphalia Cruise-In is an annual event held by the village of Westphalia every June in conjunction with the Portland Cruisers. Classic cars are displayed on downtown streets. The Cruise in 2018 hosted 1,312 cars.

=== Light parade and tree lighting ===
Hosted by the Westphalia Historical Society on the first Saturday of December, a parade goes down Main Street. Each year a person of honor "flips the switch" on the tree. St. Nikolaus joins in as well, in true German tradition in honor of the upcoming feast day. Local businesses open with specialties, treats and fun.

=== Cemetery walk ===
Hosted every September by the Westphalia Historical Society in the St. Mary Parish Cemetery, the Village Cemetery Walk is an event where historical members of the community are represented – often by living relatives – in period clothing, incorporate props, and tell stories to attendees as they walk past the deceased's graves.

=== St. Mary Parish family fest ===
Traditionally held on the 4th of July, the St. Mary Parish Picnic was officially changed in 2021 to the St. Mary's Fall Family Fest. The two-day festival held across from the church includes a cookout, beanbag tournament, Livestream of the Pewamo-Westphalia football game, bake sale, 5k/5 mile run, craft show, family concert, and evening live music.

== In popular culture ==
On January 26, 2022, the community of Westphalia was spotlighted by the EWTN show "Living Divine Mercy".

== Notable people ==
- Ardeth Platte, Dominican religious sister and anti-nuclear activist, member of the Michigan Women's Hall of Fame
- Joseph Rademacher, Catholic Bishop
