= St. Johns High School (Michigan) =

School in St. Johns, Michigan, United States

Location
- 501 West Sickels Street; St. Johns, Michigan 48879; United States; 42°59′28″N 84°33′58″W

Information
- School district: St. Johns Public Schools
- Principal: Mark Dobson
- Teaching staff: 46.41 (on an FTE basis)
- Enrollment: 950 (2018-19)
- Student to teacher ratio: 20.47
- Colors: Red; Black
- Athletics conference: Capital Area Activities Conference
- Nickname: Redwings
- Rival: DeWitt High School
- Yearbook: Wings
- Website: Official website

Student assessments
- 2021–22 school year Change vs. prior year

M-STEP 11th grade proficiency rates (Science / Social Studies)
- Advanced %: 21.8 / 9.1
- Proficient %: 28.4 / 30.3
- PR. Proficient %: 14.2 / 46.0
- Not Proficient %: 35.5 / 14.6

Average test scores
- SAT Total: 1008.4 (▲ +0.2)

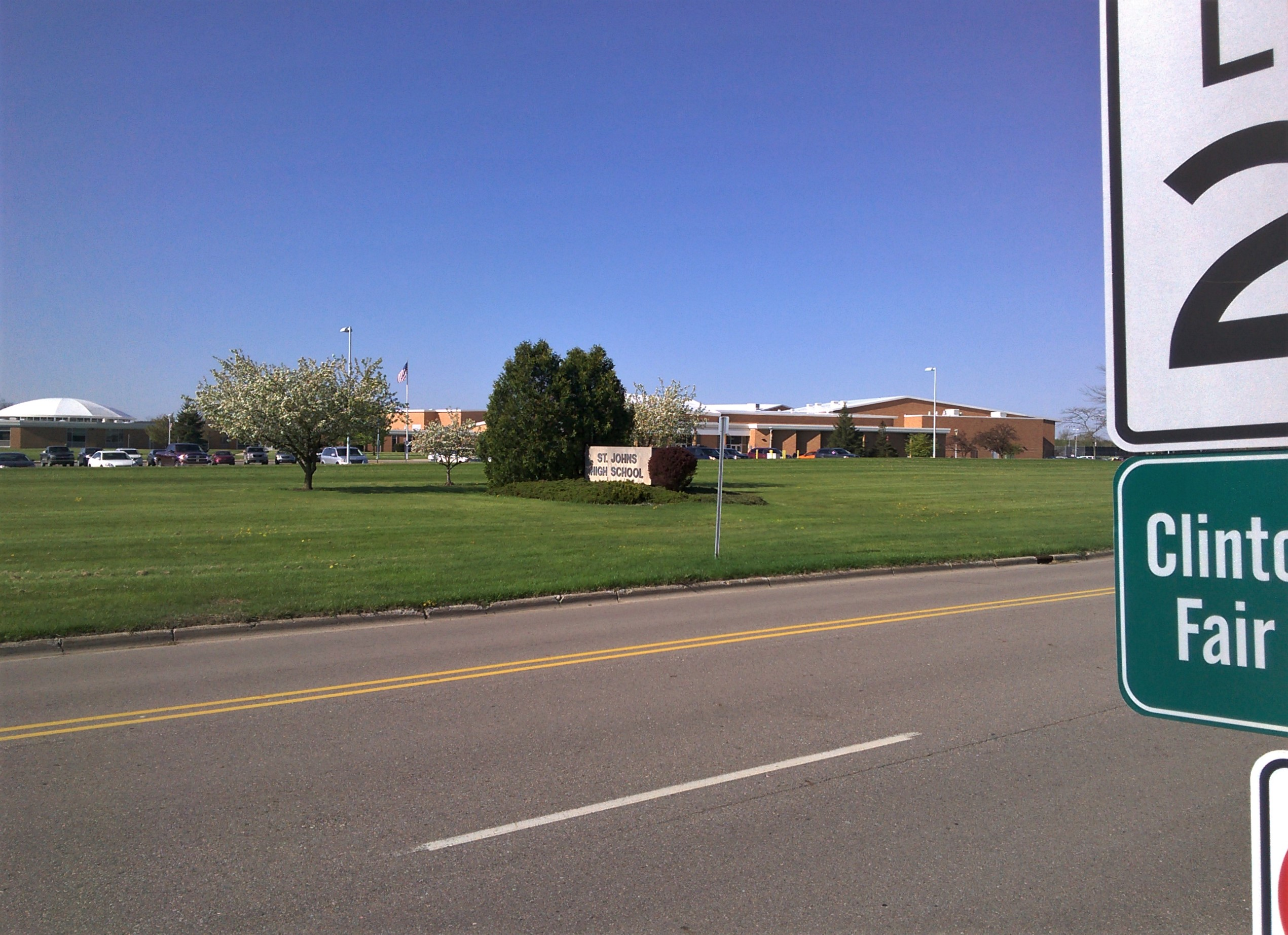
Saint Johns High School

St. Johns High School is a public school located in St. Johns, Michigan, United States. It is within Clinton County.

== Demographics ==
The demographic breakdown of the 950 students enrolled in 2018–19 is:

- Male: 51.2%
- Female: 48.8%
- Native American: 0.8%
- Asian: 0.8%
- Black: 0.9%
- Hispanic: 6.8%
- White: 87.5%
- Multiracial: 3.1%

In addition, 23.4% of students were eligible for free or reduced-price lunch.

== Athletics ==
St. Johns' athletic teams are known as the Redwings. They compete in the Capital Area Activities Conference. The school colors are red and black. The following MHSAA sports are offered at St. Johns:

- Baseball (boys)
- Basketball (boys & girls)
- Competitive cheer (girls)
- Cross country (boys & girls)
- Football (boys)
- Golf (boys & girls)
  - Boys State Champions 2016, 2017
- Gymnastics (girls)
- Ice hockey (boys)
- Soccer (boys & girls)
- Softball (girls)
- Swimming and diving (boys & girls)
- Tennis (boys & girls)
- Track (boys & girls)
  - Boys state champion – 1926
  - Girls State Champions – 2015
- Wrestling (boys)
  - State Champion – 2010–2013

== Notable alumni ==
- Chad Finley, racing driver
- Oliver Lyman Spaulding, U.S. Army brigadier general
- Jayci Simon, para-badminton player
