= Olive Township, Clinton County, Michigan =

Olive Township, Michigan
- Civil township
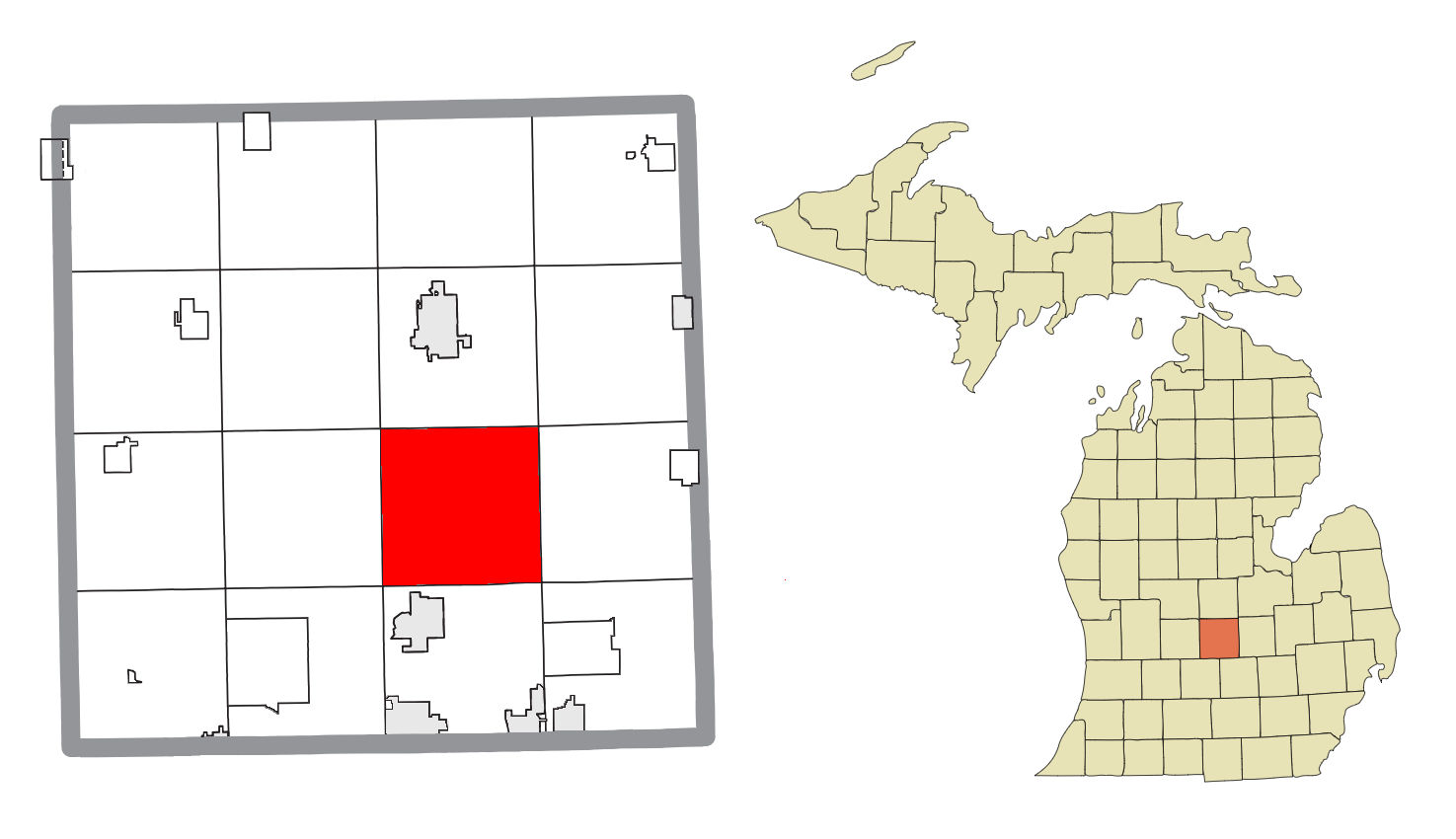
- Location within Clinton County

- Location within the state of Michigan Location within the United States
- Coordinates: 42°53′54″N 84°31′59″W
- Country: United States
- State: Michigan
- County: Clinton

Government
  - Supervisor: Eric Voisinet
  - Clerk: Sandra June

Area
  - Total: 35.82 sq mi (92.77 km^{2})
  - Land: 35.63 sq mi (92.28 km^{2})
  - Water: 0.19 sq mi (0.49 km^{2})
- Elevation: 801 ft (244 m)

Population (2020)
  - Total: 2,535
  - Density: 71.15/sq mi (27.47/km^{2})
- Time zone: UTC-5 (Eastern (EST))
  - Summer (DST): UTC-4 (EDT)
- ZIP code(s): 48820 (DeWitt); 48848 (Laingsburg); 48879 (St. Johns)
- Area code: 517
- FIPS code: 26-60440
- GNIS feature ID: 1626840
- Website: Official website

Olive Township is a civil township of Clinton County in the U.S. state of Michigan. The population was 2,535 at the 2020 census.

== Geography ==
According to the U.S. Census Bureau, Olive Township has a total area of 35.82 square miles (92.77 km^{2}), of which 35.63 square miles (92.28 km^{2}) is land and 0.19 square miles (0.49 km^{2}) (0.53%) is water.

Olive Township is located southeast of the center of Clinton County. U.S. Route 127 crosses the township, with access from exits 86 and 91. The highway leads north to St. Johns, the Clinton County seat, and south to Lansing, the state capital.

== Demographics ==
As of the census of 2000, there were 2,322 people, 826 households, and 669 families residing in the township. The population density was 65.1 inhabitants per square mile (25.1/km^{2}). There were 844 housing units at an average density of 23.7 per square mile (9.1/km^{2}). The racial makeup of the township was 97.29% White, 0.43% African American, 0.65% Native American, 0.60% Asian, 0.30% from other races, and 0.73% from two or more races. Hispanic or Latino of any race were 1.12% of the population.

There were 826 households, out of which 34.6% had children under the age of 18 living with them, 71.8% were married couples living together, 5.7% had a female householder with no husband present, and 18.9% were non-families. 16.2% of all households were made up of individuals, and 6.8% had someone living alone who was 65 years of age or older. The average household size was 2.81 and the average family size was 3.15.

In the township the population was spread out, with 27.5% under the age of 18, 6.2% from 18 to 24, 28.7% from 25 to 44, 26.5% from 45 to 64, and 11.1% who were 65 years of age or older. The median age was 38 years. For every 100 females, there were 106.2 males. For every 100 females age 18 and over, there were 101.4 males.

The median income for a household in the township was $58,571, and the median income for a family was $66,579. Males had a median income of $48,606 versus $36,301 for females. The per capita income for the township was $23,253. About 2.4% of families and 4.1% of the population were below the poverty line, including 4.0% of those under age 18 and 10.7% of those age 65 or over.
