= Westphalia Township, Michigan =

- Civil township
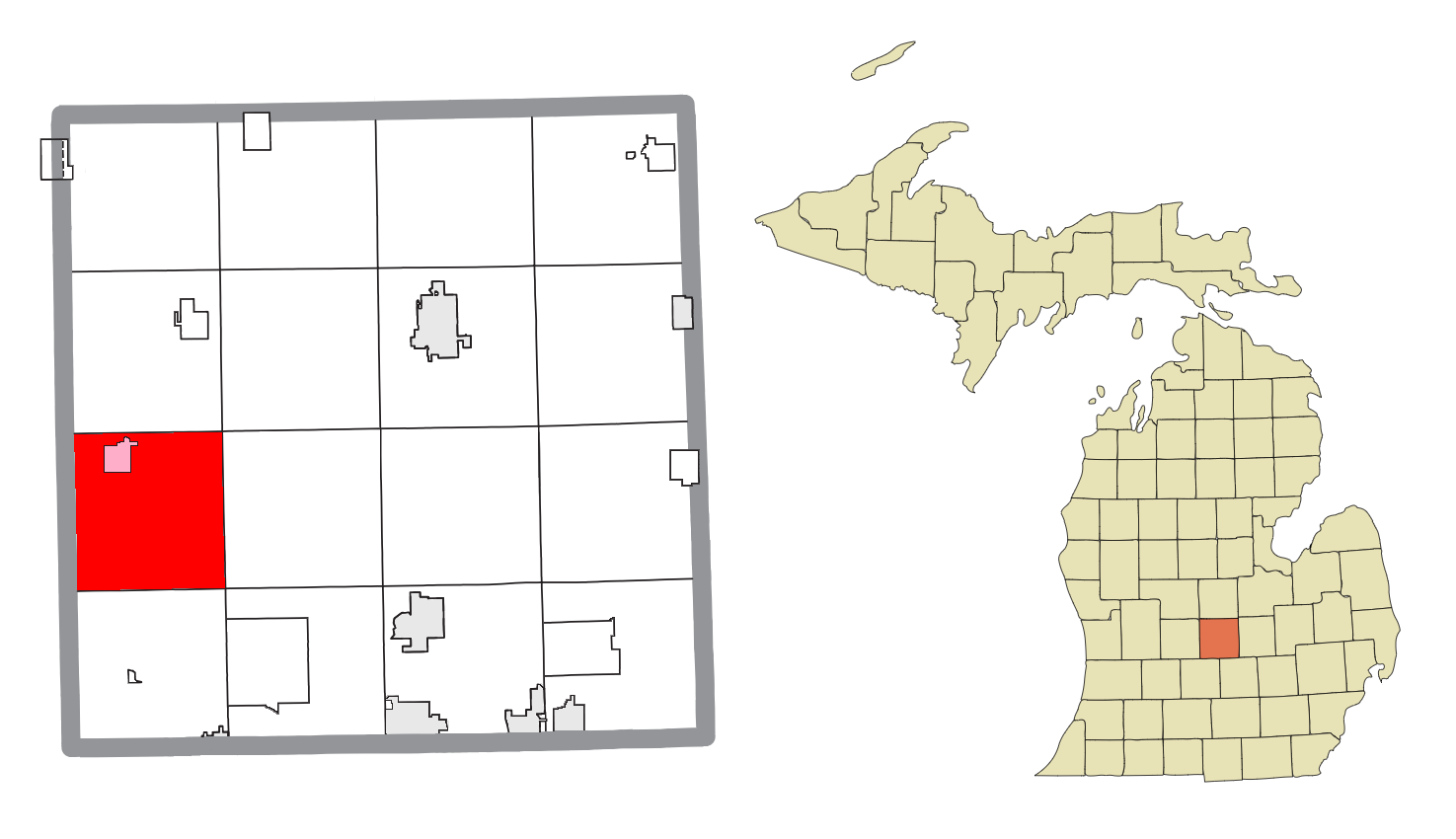
- Location within Clinton County (red) and the administered village of Westphalia (pink)

- Location within the state of Michigan Location within the United States
- Coordinates: 42°53′44″N 84°46′16″W
- Country: United States
- State: Michigan
- County: Clinton
- Established: 1836

Government
  - Supervisor: Troy Thelen
  - Clerk: Heather Platte

Area
  - Total: 35.59 sq mi (92.18 km^{2})
  - Land: 35.52 sq mi (92.00 km^{2})
  - Water: 0.069 sq mi (0.18 km^{2})
- Elevation: 771 ft (235 m)

Population (2020)
  - Total: 2,444
  - Density: 68.80/sq mi (26.57/km^{2})
- Time zone: UTC-5 (Eastern (EST))
  - Summer (DST): UTC-4 (EDT)
- ZIP code(s): 48822 (Eagle); 48835 (Fowler); 48875 (Portland); 48894 (Westphalia)
- Area code: 989
- FIPS code: 26-86140
- GNIS feature ID: 1627251
- Website: Official website

Westphalia Township is a civil township of Clinton County in the U.S. state of Michigan. As of the 2020 census, the township population was 2,444.

The village of Westphalia is located within the township.

== Geography ==
According to the United States Census Bureau, the township has a total area of 35.59 square miles (92.18 km^{2}), of which 35.52 square miles (92.00 km^{2}) is land and 0.07 square miles (0.18 km^{2}), (0.20%) is water.

Westphalia Township is located in western Clinton County and is bordered by Ionia County to the west.

== Demographics ==
As of the census of 2000, there were 2,257 people, 778 households, and 628 families residing in the township. The population density was 63.5 inhabitants per square mile (24.5/km^{2}). There were 790 housing units at an average density of 22.2 per square mile (8.6/km^{2}). The racial makeup of the township was 98.98% White, 0.13% African American, 0.22% Native American, 0.09% Asian, 0.04% from other races, and 0.53% from two or more races. Hispanic or Latino of any race were 0.22% of the population.

There were 778 households, out of which 39.5% had children under the age of 18 living with them, 73.7% were married couples living together, 4.0% had a female householder with no husband present, and 19.2% were non-families. 17.2% of all households were made up of individuals, and 8.9% had someone living alone who was 65 years of age or older. The average household size was 2.90 and the average family size was 3.29.

In the township the population was spread out, with 30.9% under the age of 18, 7.0% from 18 to 24, 28.2% from 25 to 44, 21.4% from 45 to 64, and 12.5% who were 65 years of age or older. The median age was 35 years. For every 100 females, there were 101.2 males. For every 100 females age 18 and over, there were 101.7 males.

The median income for a household in the township was $58,966, and the median income for a family was $61,993. Males had a median income of $46,094 versus $30,625 for females. The per capita income for the township was $19,491. About 2.5% of families and 2.6% of the population were below the poverty line, including 2.2% of those under age 18 and 5.6% of those age 65 or over.
