= Laingsburg, Michigan =

- City
- City of Laingsburg
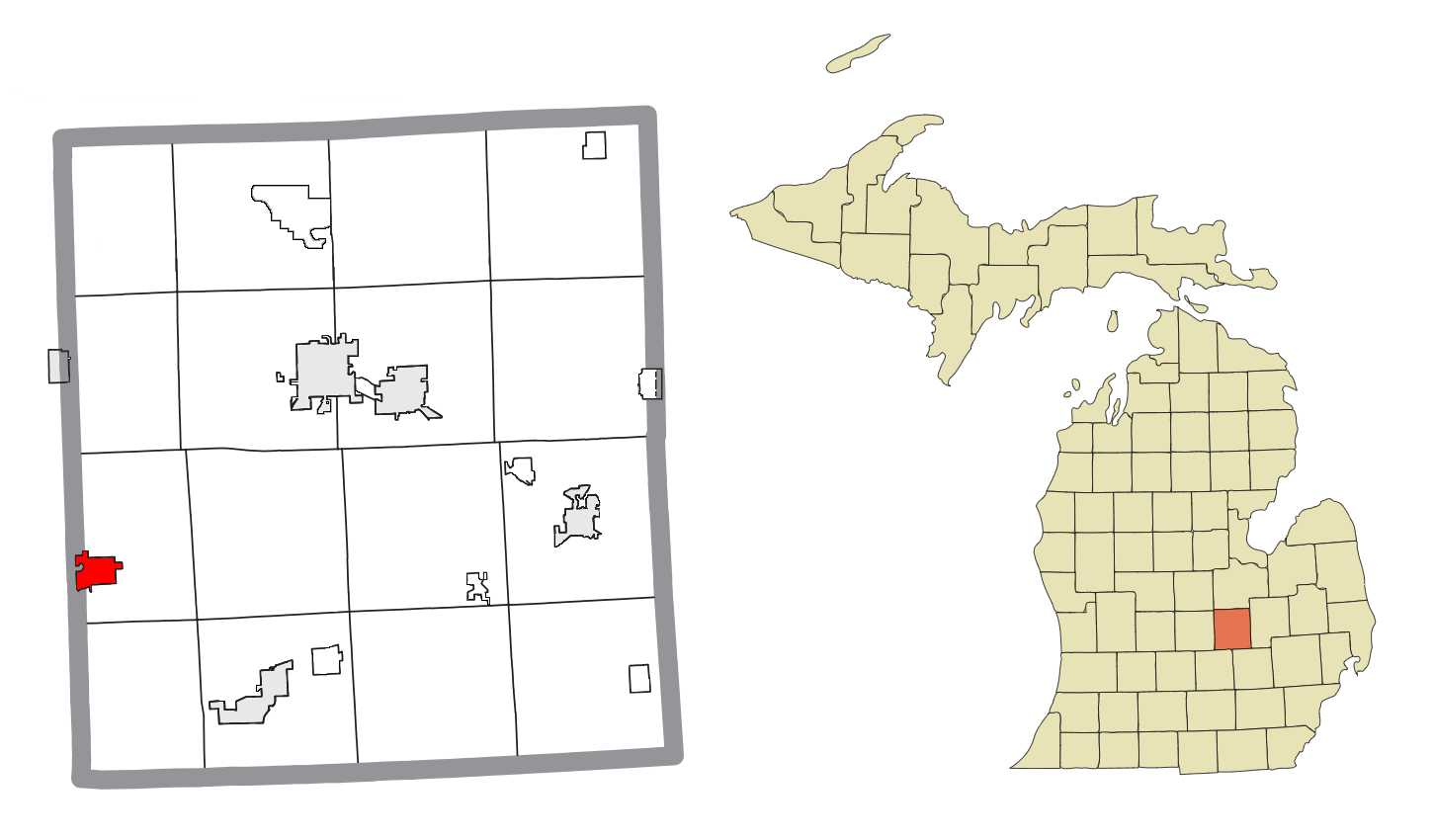
- Location within Shiawassee County

- Location within the state of Michigan Location within the United States
- Coordinates: 42°53′26″N 84°21′00″W
- Country: United States
- State: Michigan
- County: Shiawassee
- Incorporated: 1871 (village); 1951 (city)

Government
  - Type: Mayor–council
  - Mayor: Jeff Geasler
  - Clerk: Paula Willoughby

Area
  - Total: 1.69 sq mi (4.39 km^{2})
  - Land: 1.59 sq mi (4.11 km^{2})
  - Water: 0.11 sq mi (0.28 km^{2})
- Elevation: 833 ft (254 m)

Population (2020)
  - Total: 1,424
  - Density: 897.1/sq mi (346.37/km^{2})
- Time zone: UTC-5 (Eastern (EST))
  - Summer (DST): UTC-4 (EDT)
- ZIP code(s): 48848
- Area code: 517
- FIPS code: 26-44200
- GNIS feature ID: 1626570
- Website: Official website

Laingsburg (LANGS-burg) is a city in Shiawassee County in the U.S. state of Michigan. The population was 1,424 at the 2020 census.

Laingsburg is located about 20 miles (32.2 km) northeast of the city of Lansing. It is mostly surrounded by Sciota Township with a small western border with Victor Township in Clinton County. The Laingsburg 48848 ZIP Code covers a much larger area that also includes parts of Sleepy Hollow State Park and Lake Ovid to the northeast. Laingsburg was named for Dr. Peter Laing, who operated a local tavern.

== Geography ==
According to the United States Census Bureau, the city has a total area of 1.69 square miles (4.38 km^{2}), of which 1.47 square miles (3.81 km^{2}) is land and 0.22 square miles (0.57 km^{2}) (13.02%) is water.

Laingsburg is located in proximity to the Rose Lake State Wildlife Research Area and Sleepy Hollow State Park. Laingsburg has posted exits on U.S. Route 127 to the west and Interstate 69 to the south.

== Demographics ==
Historical population
Census	Pop.	Note	%±
1880	616		—
1890	654		6.2%
1900	690		5.5%
1910	703		1.9%
1920	693		−1.4%
1930	767		10.7%
1940	896		16.8%
1950	942		5.1%
1960	1,057		12.2%
1970	1,159		9.6%
1980	1,145		−1.2%
1990	1,148		0.3%
2000	1,223		6.5%
2010	1,283		4.9%
2020	1,424		11.0%
U.S. Decennial Census

=== 2010 census ===
As of the census of 2010, there were 1,283 people, 463 households, and 335 families living in the city. The population density was 872.8 inhabitants per square mile (337.0/km^{2}). There were 536 housing units at an average density of 364.6 per square mile (140.8/km^{2}). The racial makeup of the city was 96.6% White, 0.4% African American, 0.4% Native American, 0.4% Asian, 0.3% from other races, and 1.9% from two or more races. Hispanic or Latino of any race were 1.4% of the population.

There were 463 households, of which 44.7% had children under the age of 18 living with them, 49.5% were married couples living together, 15.8% had a female householder with no husband present, 7.1% had a male householder with no wife present, and 27.6% were non-families. 24.2% of all households were made up of individuals, and 9.3% had someone living alone who was 65 years of age or older. The average household size was 2.77 and the average family size was 3.24.

The median age in the city was 33.3 years. 31.6% of residents were under the age of 18; 8.9% were between the ages of 18 and 24; 27.9% were from 25 to 44; 22.1% were from 45 to 64; and 9.5% were 65 years of age or older. The gender makeup of the city was 50.3% male and 49.7% female.

=== 2000 census ===
As of the census of 2000, there were 1,223 people, 441 households, and 324 families living in the city. The population density was 733.6 inhabitants per square mile (283.2/km^{2}). There were 468 housing units at an average density of 280.7 per square mile (108.4/km^{2}). The racial makeup of the city was 98.04% White, 0.16% African American, 0.16% Native American, 0.16% Asian, 0.41% from other races, and 1.06% from two or more races. Hispanic or Latino of any race were 0.74% of the population.

There were 441 households, out of which 41.0% had children under the age of 18 living with them, 58.5% were married couples living together, 10.7% had a female householder with no husband present, and 26.5% were non-families. 22.4% of all households were made up of individuals, and 11.6% had someone living alone who was 65 years of age or older. The average household size was 2.77 and the average family size was 3.25.

In the city, the population was spread out, with 31.2% under the age of 18, 8.8% from 18 to 24, 31.0% from 25 to 44, 18.0% from 45 to 64, and 11.0% who were 65 years of age or older. The median age was 32 years. For every 100 females, there were 100.8 males. For every 100 females age 18 and over, there were 97.2 males.

The median income for an individual in the city was $39,063, and the median income for a family was $47,656. Males had a median income of $33,889 versus $24,000 for females. The per capita income for the city was $16,083. About 5.3% of families and 6.7% of the population were below the poverty line, including 6.5% of those under age 18 and 7.0% of those age 65 or over.
