= Lake Ovid =

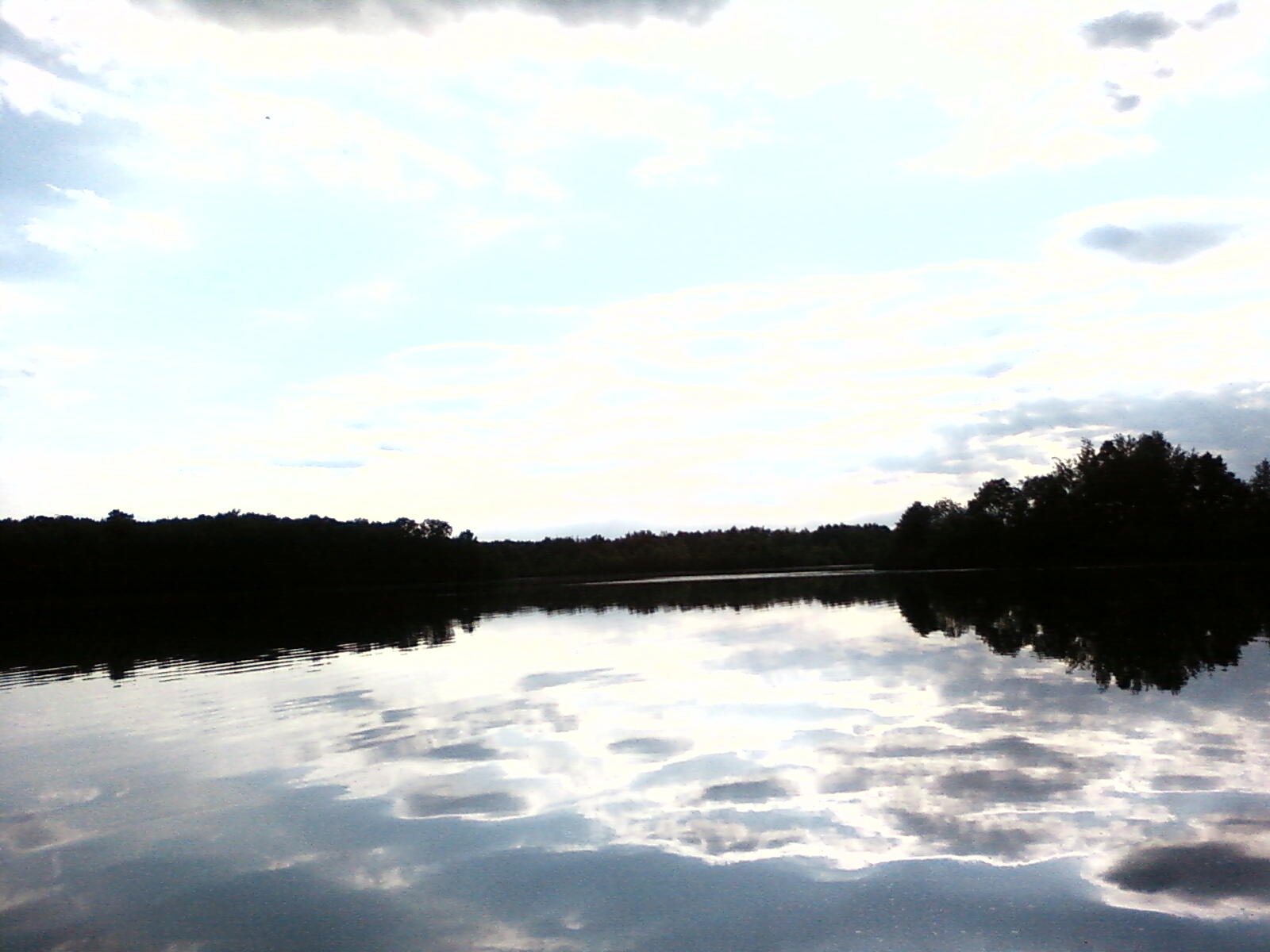

- Location within the state of Michigan
- Location: Sleepy Hollow State Park, Clinton County, Michigan, US
- Coordinates: 42°56′06″N 84°24′36″W
- Type: reservoir
- Primary inflows: Little Maple River
- Primary outflows: Little Maple River
- Basin countries: United States
- Surface area: 413 acres (167 ha)
- Average depth: 10 ft (3.0 m)
- Max. depth: 20 ft (6.1 m)
- Surface elevation: 781 ft (238 m)
- Islands: 3 (small islands, one with a foot bridge to mainland)
- Settlements: near Laingsburg, Michigan

Lake Ovid is a reservoir located within Sleepy Hollow State Park, Michigan, created in 1974 with the construction of a dam on the Little Maple River. With an average depth of 10 feet (3.0 meters), Lake Ovid is generally fairly shallow, with depths never exceeding 23 feet (7.0 meters).

Many freshwater fish live in the lake including Largemouth Bass, Smallmouth Bass, Bluegill, Rock Bass, Crappie, Channel Catfish, Muskellunge (Muskie), and Northern Pike. The Michigan Department of Natural Resources (DNR) has been monitoring the fish population annually and has determined that the smaller species of panfish have been reproducing prolifically and future stocking is going to focus on Muskellunge and Catfish. These predatory species have plenty to eat in the lake and an increase in their numbers will bring a balance to the ecosystem.

A boat landing is available at no charge to anyone with a Michigan State park sticker on their vehicle and is located on the west side of the lake. A "no wake" policy is enforced on the lake in order to maintain a peaceful fishing and boating environment. Many anglers choose to propel their vessels using electric trolling motors which allow for stealthy approaches to fishing locations and wildlife viewing. Canoes, kayaks and stand-up paddle boards are available for rent from the park for $25 per day.

The dam holding back the Little Maple River is about 30 feet in height, over 1,000 feet in length and is constructed of earthen mass. The drainage area encompasses over 10 square miles.
