= Bengal Township, Michigan =

- Civil township
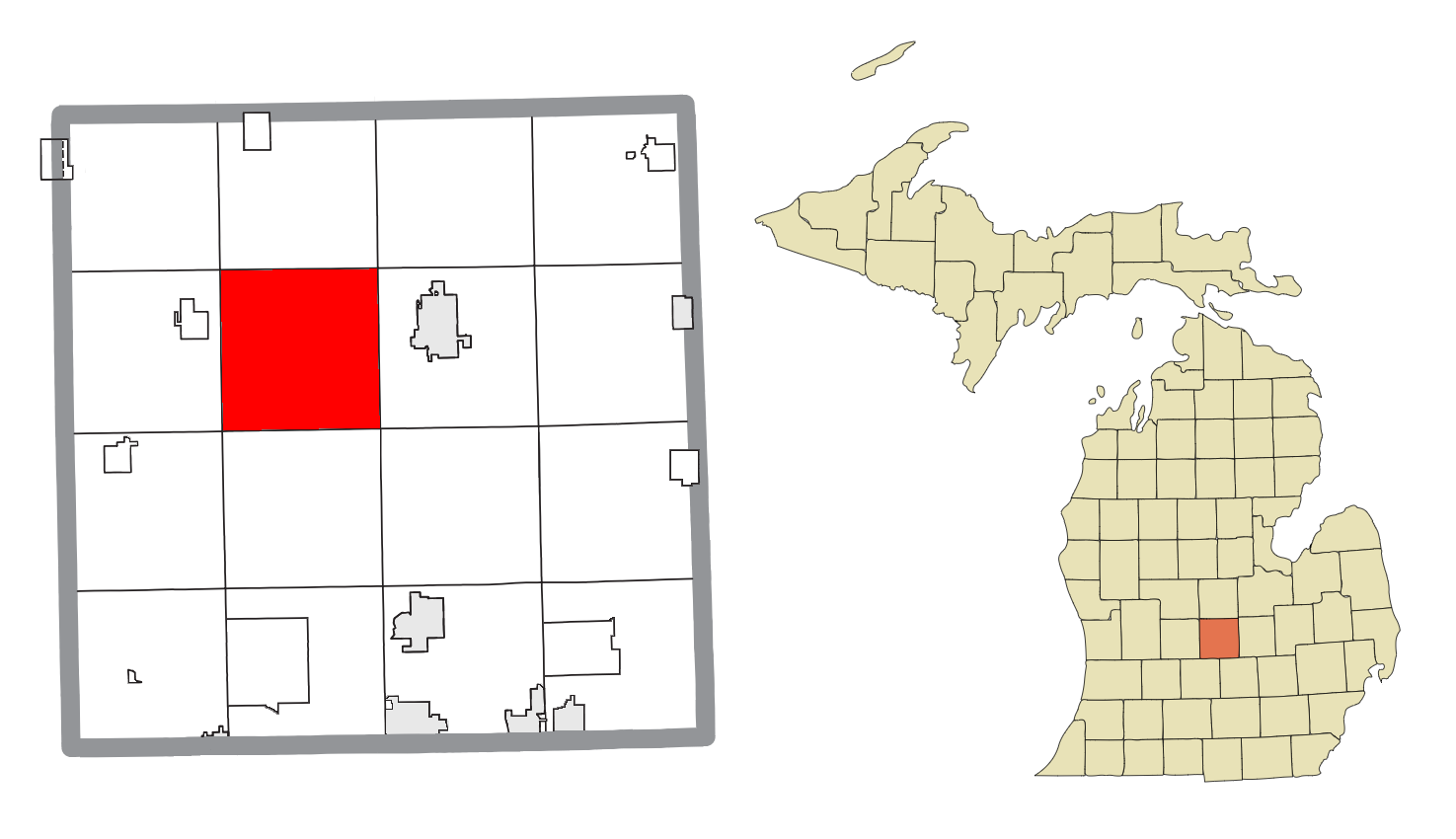
- Location within Clinton County

- Location within the state of Michigan Location within the United States
- Coordinates: 42°59′00″N 84°40′21″W
- Country: United States
- State: Michigan
- County: Clinton
- Established: 1840

Government
  - Supervisor: Nicholas McDonald
  - Clerk: Sharon Bassette

Area
  - Total: 36.54 sq mi (94.64 km^{2})
  - Land: 36.53 sq mi (94.61 km^{2})
  - Water: 0.012 sq mi (0.03 km^{2})
- Elevation: 735 ft (224 m)

Population (2020)
  - Total: 1,138
  - Density: 31.15/sq mi (12.03/km^{2})
- Time zone: UTC-5 (Eastern (EST))
  - Summer (DST): UTC-4 (EDT)
- ZIP code(s): 48835 (Fowler); 48879 (St. Johns)
- Area code: 989
- FIPS code: 26-07240
- GNIS feature ID: 1625912
- Website: Official website

Bengal Township is a civil township of Clinton County in the U.S. state of Michigan. The population was 1,138 at the 2020 census.

== Geography ==
According to the United States Census Bureau, the township has a total area of 36.54 square miles (94.64 km^{2}), of which 36.53 square miles (94.61 km^{2}) is land and 0.01 square miles (0.03 km^{2}) (0.03%) is water.

Bengal Township is located northwest of the center of Clinton County. M-21 crosses the township, leading east to St. Johns, the county seat, and west to Ionia.

== Demographics ==
As of the census of 2000, there were 1,174 people, 379 households, and 316 families residing in the township. The population density was 32.1 inhabitants per square mile (12.4/km^{2}). There were 384 housing units at an average density of 10.5 per square mile (4.1/km^{2}). The racial makeup of the township was 97.53% White, 0.09% African American, 0.43% Native American, 0.34% Asian, 1.19% from other races, and 0.43% from two or more races. Hispanic or Latino of any race were 2.30% of the population.

There were 379 households, out of which 43.0% had children under the age of 18 living with them, 77.0% were married couples living together, 3.7% had a female householder with no husband present, and 16.6% were non-families. 15.0% of all households were made up of individuals, and 6.1% had someone living alone who was 65 years of age or older. The average household size was 3.10 and the average family size was 3.47.

In the township the population was spread out, with 33.2% under the age of 18, 6.9% from 18 to 24, 29.6% from 25 to 44, 21.3% from 45 to 64, and 8.9% who were 65 years of age or older. The median age was 35 years. For every 100 females, there were 104.9 males. For every 100 females age 18 and over, there were 108.0 males.

The median income for a household in the township was $60,673, and the median income for a family was $63,229. Males had a median income of $41,346 versus $29,250 for females. The per capita income for the township was $20,917. About 3.0% of families and 4.2% of the population were below the poverty line, including 5.7% of those under age 18 and 7.3% of those age 65 or over.
