= Sciota Township, Michigan =

- Civil township
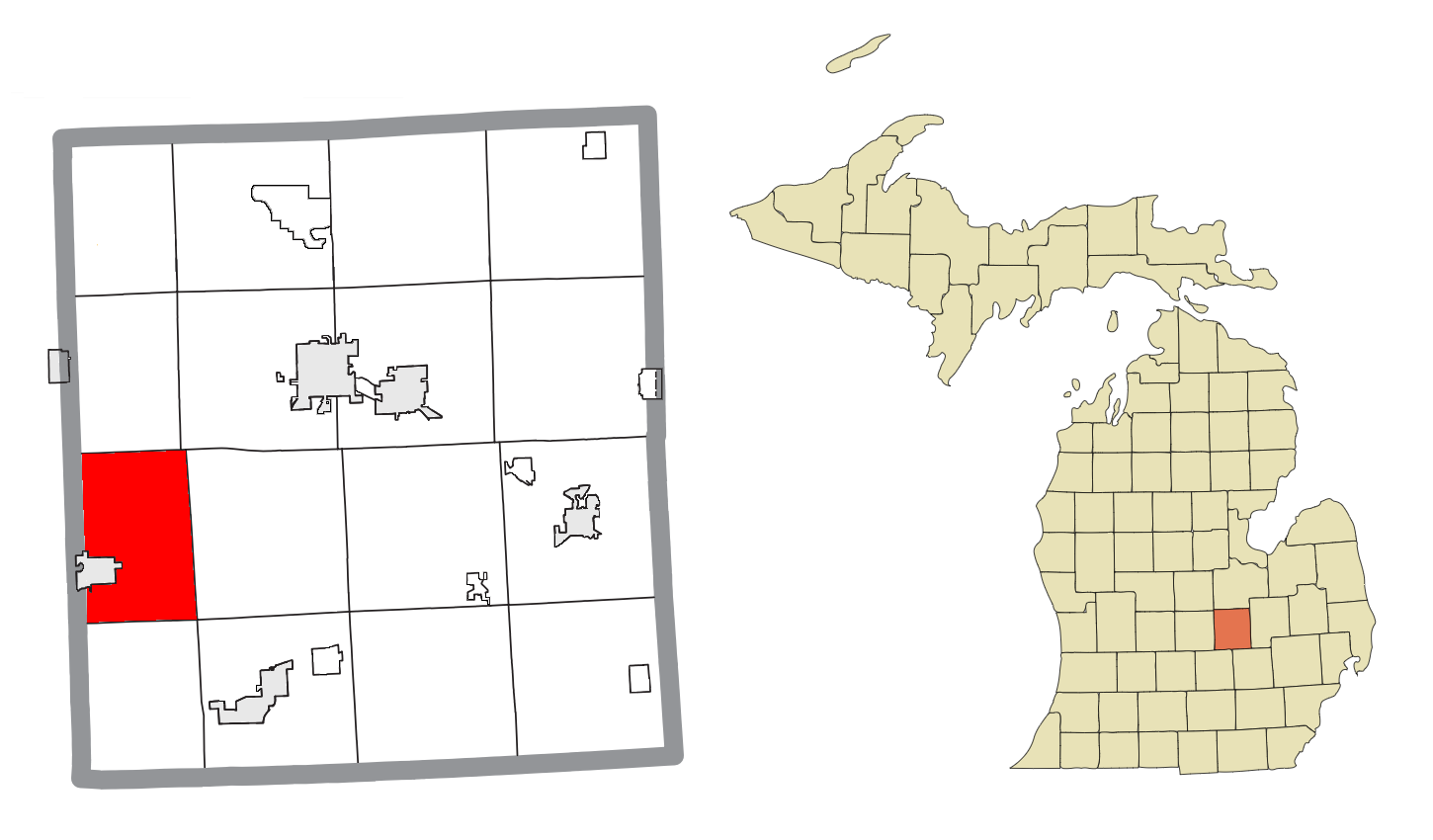
- Location within Shiawassee County

- Location within the state of Michigan Sciota Township (the United States)
- Coordinates: 42°54′23″N 84°19′25″W
- Country: United States
- State: Michigan
- County: Shiawassee
- Established: 1842

Government
  - Supervisor: Phillip Matthews
  - Clerk: Jamie Parker-Wing

Area
  - Total: 26.81 sq mi (69.4 km^{2})
  - Land: 25.13 sq mi (65.1 km^{2})
  - Water: 1.68 sq mi (4.4 km^{2})
- Elevation: 863 ft (263 m)

Population (2020)
  - Total: 1,688
  - Density: 67.17/sq mi (25.93/km^{2})
- Time zone: UTC-5 (Eastern (EST))
  - Summer (DST): UTC-4 (EDT)
- ZIP code(s): 48848 (Laingsburg); 48866 (Ovid)
- Area code: 989
- FIPS code: 26-71960
- GNIS feature ID: 1627051
- Website: Official website

Sciota Township is a civil township of Shiawassee County in the U.S. state of Michigan. The population as of the last census is 1,688 in the 2020 census. The township mostly surrounds the city of Laingsburg, but the two are administered autonomously.

== Geography ==
According to the United States Census Bureau, the township has a total area of 26.81 square miles (69.44 km^{2}), of which 25.13 square miles (65.09 km^{2}) is land and 1.68 square miles (4.4 km^{2}) (6.27%) is water.

The Looking Glass River flows through the southern portion of the township.

== Demographics ==
As of the census of 2000, there were 1,801 people, 625 households, and 513 families residing in the township. The population density was 67.4 inhabitants per square mile (26.0/km^{2}). There were 633 housing units at an average density of 23.7 per square mile (9.2/km^{2}). The racial makeup of the township was 97.06% White, 0.56% African American, 0.61% Native American, 0.06% Asian, 0.39% from other races, and 1.33% from two or more races. Hispanic or Latino of any race were 1.22% of the population.

There were 625 households, out of which 38.1% had children under the age of 18 living with them, 71.8% were married couples living together, 6.2% had a female householder with no husband present, and 17.8% were non-families. 13.3% of all households were made up of individuals, and 4.3% had someone living alone who was 65 years of age or older. The average household size was 2.86 and the average family size was 3.11.

26.8% of the population was under the age of 18, 7.2% from 18 to 24, 31.1% from 25 to 44, 25.5% from 45 to 64, and 9.4% who were 65 years of age or older. The median age was 37 years. For every 100 females, there were 103.7 males. For every 100 females age 18 and over, there were 100.2 males.

The median income for a household in the township was $55,375, and the median income for a family was $56,563. Males had a median income of $40,268 versus $27,847 for females. The per capita income for the township was $20,502. About 6.0% of families and 8.5% of the population were below the poverty line, including 10.9% of those under age 18 and 12.7% of those age 65 or over.
