= Victor Township, Michigan =

- Civil township
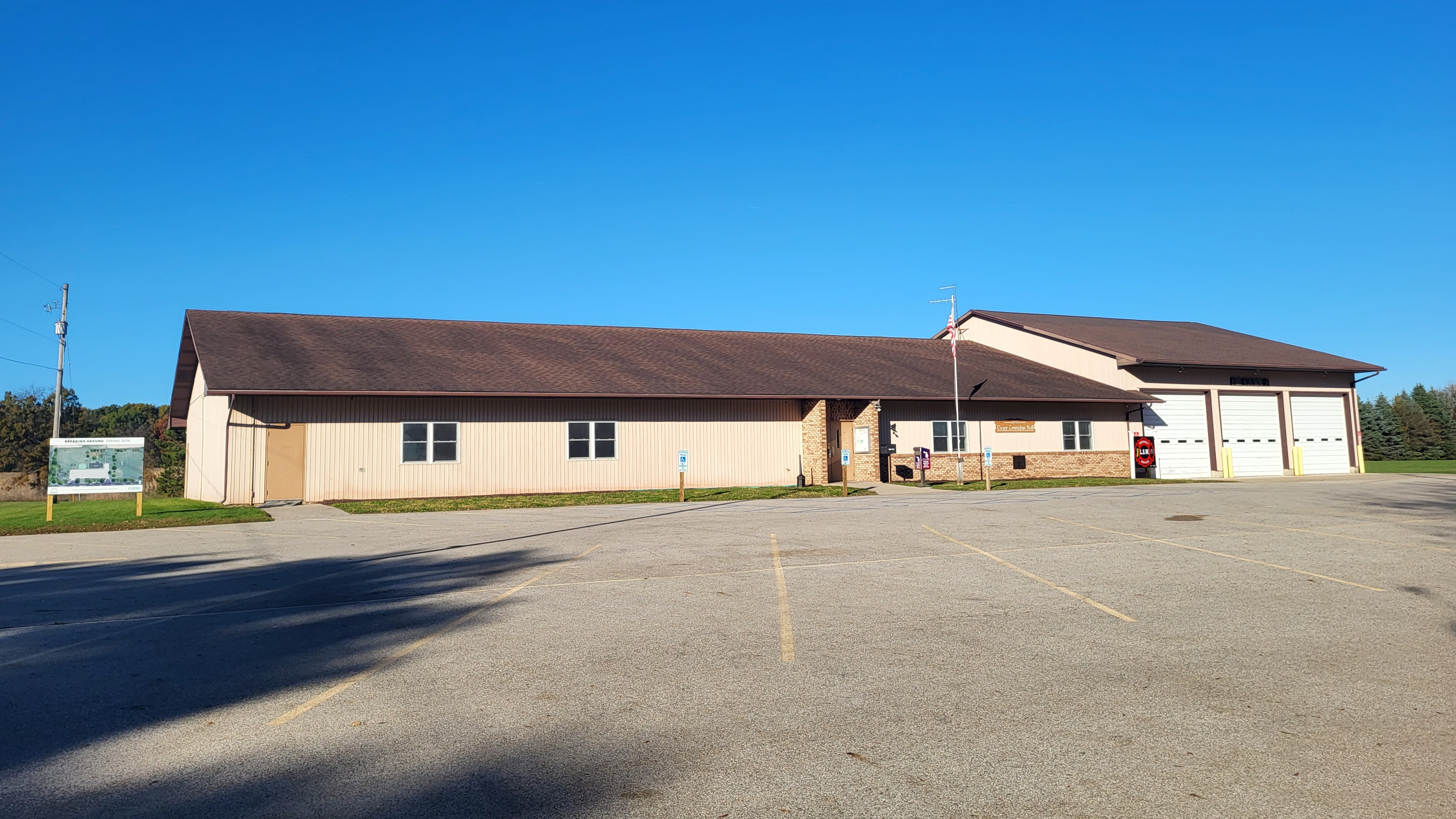
- Victor Township Hall and Fire Department

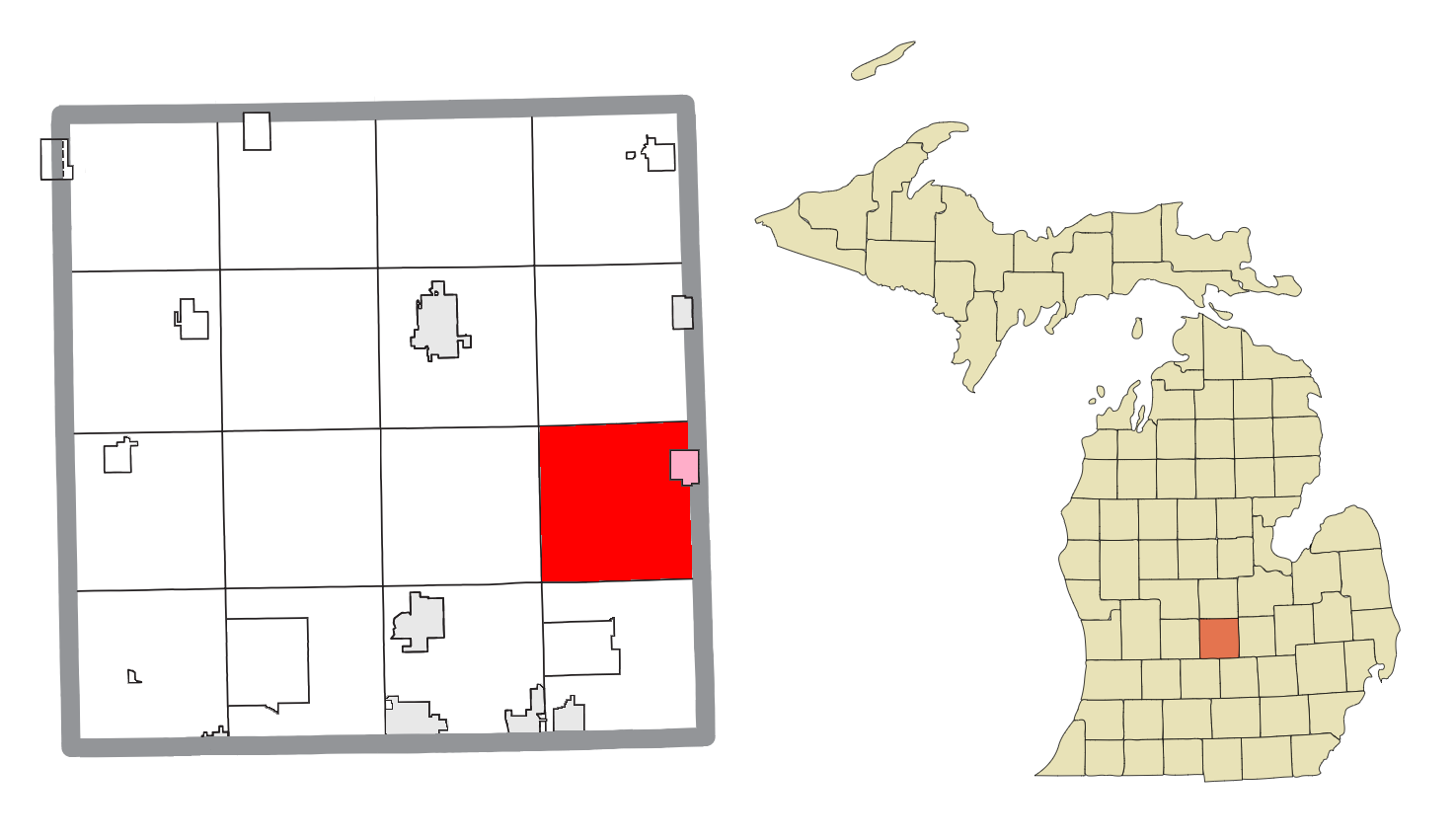
- Location within Clinton County (red) and the administered community of Lake Victoria (pink)

- Location within the state of Michigan Location within the United States
- Coordinates: 42°53′54″N 84°25′20″W
- Country: United States
- State: Michigan
- County: Clinton
- Organized: 1836

Government
  - Supervisor: James Conklin
  - Clerk: Amanda Conklin

Area
  - Total: 35.96 sq mi (93.14 km^{2})
  - Land: 33.93 sq mi (87.88 km^{2})
  - Water: 2.03 sq mi (5.26 km^{2})
- Elevation: 797 ft (243 m)

Population (2020)
  - Total: 3,463
  - Density: 102.1/sq mi (39.41/km^{2})
- Time zone: UTC-5 (Eastern (EST))
  - Summer (DST): UTC-4 (EDT)
- ZIP code(s): 48808 (Bath); 48820 (DeWitt); 48848 (Laingsburg); 48866 (Ovid); 48879 (St. Johns)
- Area code: 517
- FIPS code: 26-82320
- GNIS feature ID: 1627199
- Website: Official website

Victor Township is a civil township of Clinton County in the U.S. state of Michigan. The population was 3,463 at the 2020 census.

== Communities ==
- Lake Victoria is an unincorporated community and census-designated place located in the northeast portion of the township.

== Geography ==
According to the U.S. Census Bureau, the township has a total area of 35.96 square miles (93.14 km^{2}), of which 33.93 square miles (87.88 km^{2}) is land and 2.03 square miles (5.26 km^{2}) (5.65%) is water.

Victor Township is located in eastern Clinton County and is bordered by Shiawassee County to the east. Larger water bodies in the township include Round Lake, Lake Victoria, and Lake Ovid, which is part of Sleepy Hollow State Park. The Looking Glass River, a tributary of the Grand River, flows from east to west across the southern part of the township.

== Demographics ==
As of the census of 2000, there were 3,275 people, 1,139 households, and 930 families residing in the township. The population density was 94.8 inhabitants per square mile (36.6/km^{2}). There were 1,166 housing units at an average density of 33.7 per square mile (13.0/km^{2}). The racial makeup of the township was 97.65% White, 0.43% African American, 0.18% Native American, 0.06% Asian, 0.67% from other races, and 1.01% from two or more races. Hispanic or Latino of any race were 1.74% of the population.

There were 1,139 households, out of which 40.7% had children under the age of 18 living with them, 73.3% were married couples living together, 5.2% had a female householder with no husband present, and 18.3% were non-families. 14.8% of all households were made up of individuals, and 3.7% had someone living alone who was 65 years of age or older. The average household size was 2.87 and the average family size was 3.20.

In the township the population was spread out, with 29.1% under the age of 18, 5.6% from 18 to 24, 31.0% from 25 to 44, 27.3% from 45 to 64, and 7.0% who were 65 years of age or older. The median age was 38 years. For every 100 females, there were 101.0 males. For every 100 females age 18 and over, there were 99.9 males.

The median income for a household in the township was $59,375, and the median income for a family was $64,356. Males had a median income of $42,413 versus $30,703 for females. The per capita income for the township was $24,353. About 1.3% of families and 2.0% of the population were below the poverty line, including none of those under age 18 and 9.5% of those age 65 or over.

== Notable person ==
- James H. Robinson, Medal of Honor recipient during the American Civil War
