= Riley Township, Clinton County, Michigan =

Riley Township, Michigan
- Civil township
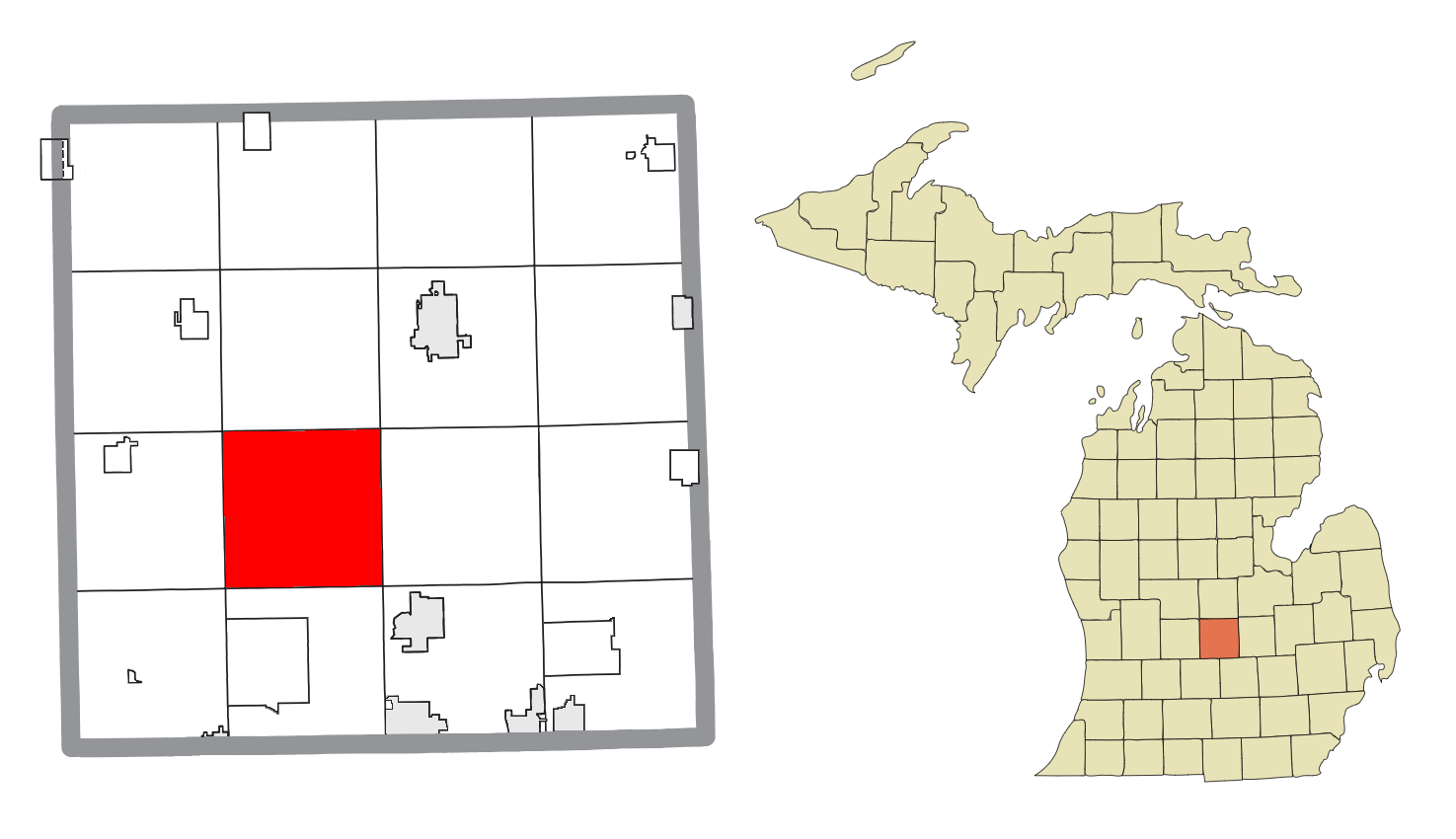
- Location within Clinton County

- Location within the state of Michigan Location within the United States
- Coordinates: 42°54′16″N 84°40′35″W
- Country: United States
- State: Michigan
- County: Clinton
- Organized: 1836

Government
  - Supervisor: Donald Potts
  - Clerk: Lisa Powell

Area
  - Total: 35.73 sq mi (92.54 km^{2})
  - Land: 35.71 sq mi (92.49 km^{2})
  - Water: 0.019 sq mi (0.05 km^{2})
- Elevation: 781 ft (238 m)

Population (2020)
  - Total: 2,020
  - Density: 56.6/sq mi (21.8/km^{2})
- Time zone: UTC-5 (Eastern (EST))
  - Summer (DST): UTC-4 (EDT)
- ZIP code(s): 48820 (DeWitt); 48835 (Fowler); 48879 (St. Johns)
- Area code: 517
- FIPS code: 26-68600
- GNIS feature ID: 1626981
- Website: Official website

Riley Township is a civil township of Clinton County in the U.S. state of Michigan. The population was 2,020 at the 2020 census.

== Geography ==
According to the U.S. Census Bureau, the township has a total area of 35.73 square miles (92.54 km^{2}), of which 35.71 square miles (92.49 km^{2}) is land and 0.02 square miles (0.05 km^{2}) (0.06%) is water.

Riley Township is located southwest of the center of Clinton County.

== Demographics ==
As of the census of 2000, there were 1,767 people, 611 households, and 507 families residing in the township. The population density was 49.5 inhabitants per square mile (19.1/km^{2}). There were 625 housing units at an average density of 17.5 per square mile (6.8/km^{2}). The racial makeup of the township was 96.26% White, 0.28% Native American, 0.11% Asian, 0.11% Pacific Islander, 0.74% from other races, and 2.49% from two or more races. Hispanic or Latino of any race were 1.87% of the population.

There were 611 households, out of which 40.4% had children under the age of 18 living with them, 74.6% were married couples living together, 4.6% had a female householder with no husband present, and 17.0% were non-families. 12.1% of all households were made up of individuals, and 4.3% had someone living alone who was 65 years of age or older. The average household size was 2.87 and the average family size was 3.13.

In the township the population was spread out, with 29.0% under the age of 18, 6.6% from 18 to 24, 30.1% from 25 to 44, 25.6% from 45 to 64, and 8.8% who were 65 years of age or older. The median age was 37 years. For every 100 females, there were 101.9 males. For every 100 females age 18 and over, there were 105.1 males.

The median income for a household in the township was $61,375, and the median income for a family was $64,154. Males had a median income of $45,577 versus $31,852 for females. The per capita income for the township was $21,682. About 1.8% of families and 3.7% of the population were below the poverty line, including 5.1% of those under age 18 and 6.7% of those age 65 or over.
