= Ovid Township, Clinton County, Michigan =

Ovid Township, Michigan
- Civil township
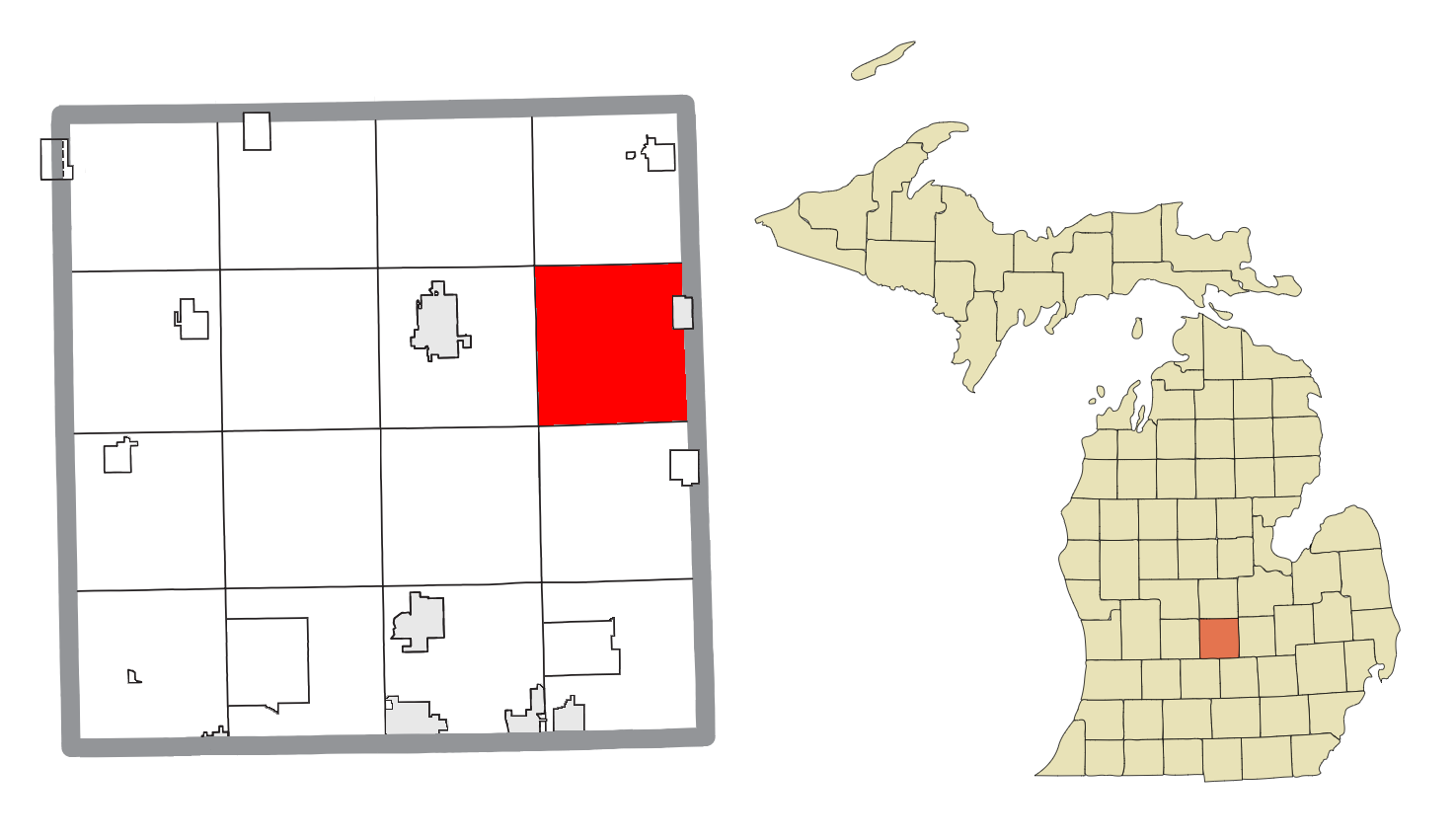
- Location within Clinton County

- Location within the state of Michigan Location within the United States
- Coordinates: 42°59′42″N 84°24′18″W
- Country: United States
- State: Michigan
- County: Clinton

Government
  - Supervisor: Deb Shaughnessy
  - Clerk: Claudia Barrett Pluger

Area
  - Total: 35.99 sq mi (93.21 km^{2})
  - Land: 35.84 sq mi (92.83 km^{2})
  - Water: 0.16 sq mi (0.41 km^{2})
- Elevation: 745 ft (227 m)

Population (2020)
  - Total: 2,188
  - Density: 61.05/sq mi (23.57/km^{2})
- Time zone: UTC-5 (Eastern (EST))
  - Summer (DST): UTC-4 (EDT)
- ZIP code(s): 48866 (Ovid); 48879 (St. Johns)
- Area code: 989
- FIPS code: 26-61880
- GNIS feature ID: 1626874
- Website: https://www.ovidtwp.org/

Ovid Township is a civil township of Clinton County in the U.S. state of Michigan. As of the 2020 census, the township had a population of 2,188. The population has decreased significantly after the village of Ovid separated from the township and incorporated into a city in 2015.

== Communities ==
- The city of Ovid was once a village mostly located within the township, but it is now an autonomous city.
- Shepardsville is an unincorporated community within the township at 43°00′16″N 84°25′33″W.

== Geography ==
According to the U.S. Census Bureau in 2010, the township had a total area of 35.99 square miles (93.21 km^{2}), of which 35.84 square miles (92.83 km^{2}) is land and 0.16 square miles (0.41 km^{2}) (0.44%) is water. However, after the village of Ovid incorporated into a city in 2015, the township area was reduced to 35.07 square miles (90.83 km^{2}) of land and 34.92 square miles (90.44 km^{2}) of water.

Ovid Township is located in eastern Clinton County, bordered by Shiawassee County to the east.

== Demographics ==
As of the census of 2000, there were 3,490 people, 1,225 households, and 927 families residing in the township. The population density was 97.4 inhabitants per square mile (37.6/km^{2}). There were 1,279 housing units at an average density of 35.7 per square mile (13.8/km^{2}). The racial makeup of the township was 97.05% White, 0.17% African American, 0.43% Native American, 0.26% Pacific Islander, 0.83% from other races, and 1.26% from two or more races. Hispanic or Latino of any race were 3.15% of the population.

There were 1,225 households, out of which 37.8% had children under the age of 18 living with them, 61.1% were married couples living together, 10.7% had a female householder with no husband present, and 24.3% were non-families. 19.5% of all households were made up of individuals, and 7.6% had someone living alone who was 65 years of age or older. The average household size was 2.77 and the average family size was 3.19.

In the township the population was spread out, with 28.8% under the age of 18, 8.3% from 18 to 24, 28.5% from 25 to 44, 21.3% from 45 to 64, and 13.2% who were 65 years of age or older. The median age was 35 years. For every 100 females, there were 91.5 males. For every 100 females age 18 and over, there were 87.6 males.

The median income for a household in the township was $42,250, and the median income for a family was $46,105. Males had a median income of $35,231 versus $25,507 for females. The per capita income for the township was $17,602. About 5.7% of families and 6.6% of the population were below the poverty line, including 9.4% of those under age 18 and 5.5% of those age 65 or over.
