= Clinton County, Michigan =

County in Michigan, United States

- County
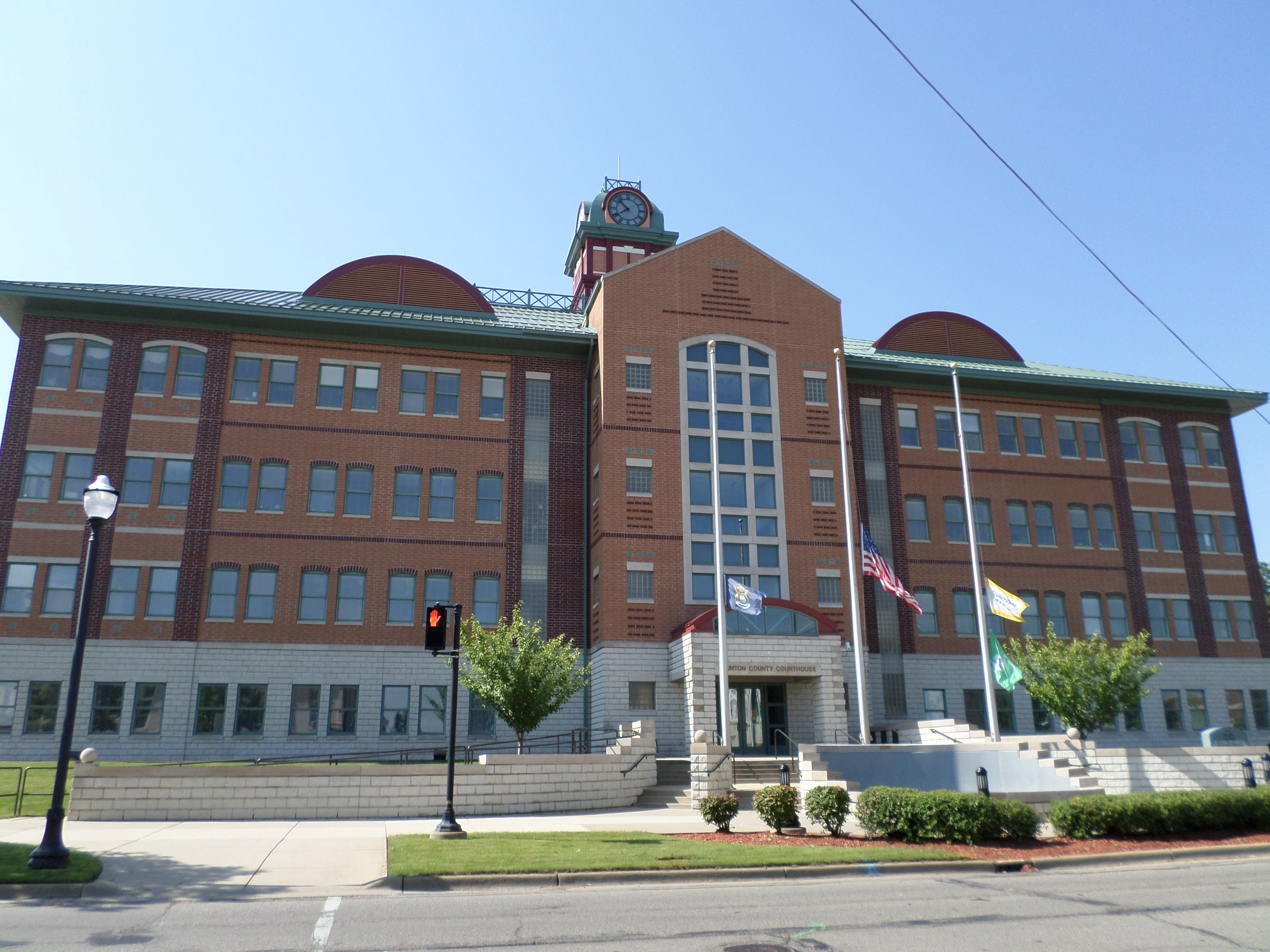
- Clinton County Courthouse in St. Johns

- Flag Seal

- Location within the U.S. state of Michigan
- Coordinates: 42°56′N 84°37′W
- Country: United States
- State: Michigan
- Founded: 1831
- Named for: DeWitt Clinton
- Seat: St. Johns
- Largest city: St. Johns

Area
  - Total: 574 sq mi (1,490 km^{2})
  - Land: 566 sq mi (1,470 km^{2})
  - Water: 8.1 sq mi (21 km^{2}) 1.4%

Population (2020)
  - Total: 79,128
  - Estimate (2025): 80,432 ▲
  - Density: 140/sq mi (54.0/km^{2})
- Time zone: UTC−5 (Eastern)
  - Summer (DST): UTC−4 (EDT)
- Congressional district: 7th
- Website: clinton-county.org

Clinton County is a county in the U.S. state of Michigan. As of the 2020 United States census, the population was 79,128. The county seat is St. Johns. The county was created in 1831 and organized in 1839. It is named after early American politician DeWitt Clinton. Clinton County is included in the Lansing-East Lansing, MI Metropolitan Statistical Area.

== Geography ==
According to the U.S. Census Bureau, the county has a total area of 575 square miles (1,490 km^{2}), of which 566 square miles (1,470 km^{2}) is land and 8.1 square miles (21 km^{2}) (1.4%) is water.

=== Adjacent counties ===
- Saginaw County (northeast)
- Gratiot County (north)
- Montcalm County (northwest)
- Shiawassee County (east)
- Ionia County (west)
- Ingham County (southeast)
- Eaton County (southwest)

== Demographics ==
Historical population
Census	Pop.	Note	%±
1840	1,614		—
1850	5,102		216.1%
1860	13,916		172.8%
1870	22,845		64.2%
1880	28,100		23.0%
1890	26,509		−5.7%
1900	25,136		−5.2%
1910	23,129		−8.0%
1920	23,110		−0.1%
1930	24,174		4.6%
1940	26,671		10.3%
1950	31,195		17.0%
1960	37,969		21.7%
1970	48,492		27.7%
1980	55,893		15.3%
1990	57,883		3.6%
2000	64,753		11.9%
2010	75,382		16.4%
2020	79,128		5.0%
2025 (est.)	80,432	▲	1.6%
U.S. Decennial Census; 1790-1960 1900-1990; 1990-2000 2010-2018

=== Racial and ethnic composition ===
Clinton County, Michigan – Racial and ethnic composition Note: the US Census treats Hispanic/Latino as an ethnic category. This table excludes Latinos from the racial categories and assigns them to a separate category. Hispanics/Latinos may be of any race.
Race / Ethnicity (NH = Non-Hispanic)	Pop 1980	Pop 1990	Pop 2000	Pop 2010	Pop 2020	% 1980	% 1990	% 2000	% 2010	% 2020
White alone (NH)	48,930	52,553	61,416	68,243	67,915	94.43%	92.16%	94.85%	90.53%	85.83%
Black or African American alone (NH)	1,610	2,954	401	1,506	1,640	3.11%	5.18%	0.62%	2.00%	2.07%
Native American or Alaska Native alone (NH)	188	212	262	309	234	0.36%	0.37%	0.40%	0.41%	0.30%
Asian alone (NH)	104	118	333	1,105	1,870	0.20%	0.21%	0.51%	1.47%	2.36%
Native Hawaiian or Pacific Islander alone (NH)	x	x	19	12	23	x	x	0.03%	0.02%	0.03%
Other race alone (NH)	76	11	40	67	241	0.15%	0.02%	0.06%	0.09%	0.30%
Mixed race or Multiracial (NH)	x	x	594	1,193	3,265	x	x	0.92%	1.58%	4.13%
Hispanic or Latino (any race)	907	1,176	1,688	2,947	3,940	1.75%	2.06%	2.61%	3.91%	4.98%
Total	51,815	57,024	64,753	75,382	79,128	100.00%	100.00%	100.00%	100.00%	100.00%

=== 2020 census ===
As of the 2020 census, the county had a population of 79,128. The median age was 40.0 years; 22.7% of residents were under the age of 18 and 17.8% of residents were 65 years of age or older. For every 100 females there were 96.5 males, and for every 100 females age 18 and over there were 95.3 males age 18 and over.

The racial makeup of the county was 87.5% White, 2.2% Black or African American, 0.4% American Indian and Alaska Native, 2.4% Asian, <0.1% Native Hawaiian and Pacific Islander, 1.5% from some other race, and 6.1% from two or more races. Hispanic or Latino residents of any race comprised 5.0% of the population.

48.7% of residents lived in urban areas, while 51.3% lived in rural areas.

There were 31,087 households in the county, of which 29.9% had children under the age of 18 living in them. Of all households, 54.9% were married-couple households, 16.4% were households with a male householder and no spouse or partner present, and 22.4% were households with a female householder and no spouse or partner present. About 24.5% of all households were made up of individuals and 10.2% had someone living alone who was 65 years of age or older.

There were 32,821 housing units, of which 5.3% were vacant. Among occupied housing units, 77.5% were owner-occupied and 22.5% were renter-occupied. The homeowner vacancy rate was 1.1% and the rental vacancy rate was 8.1%.

=== 2000 census ===
As of the 2000 census, there were 64,753 people, 23,653 households, and 17,976 families residing in the county. The population density was 113 inhabitants per square mile (44/km^{2}). There were 24,630 housing units at an average density of 43 per square mile (17/km^{2}). The racial makeup of the county was 96.40% White, 0.63% Black or African American, 0.44% Native American, 0.52% Asian, 0.04% Pacific Islander, 0.81% from other races, and 1.17% from two or more races. 2.61% of the population were Hispanic or Latino of any race. 35.3% were of German, 11.4% English, 10.1% American and 8.5% Irish ancestry, 96.4% spoke English and 1.9% Spanish as their first language.

There were 23,653 households, out of which 37.40% had children under the age of 18 living with them, 64.30% were married couples living together, 8.40% had a female householder with no husband present, and 24.00% were non-families. 19.80% of all households were made up of individuals, and 7.10% had someone living alone who was 65 years of age or older. The average household size was 2.70 and the average family size was 3.12.

In the county, the population was spread out, with 28.10% under the age of 18, 7.30% from 18 to 24, 29.20% from 25 to 44, 24.50% from 45 to 64, and 10.90% who were 65 years of age or older. The median age was 37 years. For every 100 females, there were 98.90 males. For every 100 females age 18 and over, there were 95.60 males.

The median income for a household in the county was $52,806, and the median income for a family was $60,491. Males had a median income of $42,379 versus $31,065 for females. The per capita income for the county was $22,913. About 3.30% of families and 4.60% of the population were below the poverty line, including 5.30% of those under age 18 and 6.00% of those age 65 or over.

== Transportation ==
=== Highways ===
- I-69 travels across southern Clinton County bypassing Lansing on the north. To the south, I-69 continues toward Battle Creek and Fort Wayne, Indiana. Easterly, the highway travels on to Flint and Port Huron.
- I-73 is planned to parallel or overlap with US Route 127.
- I-96 runs through the southwestern corner of the county before turning southerly to bypass Lansing. It connects Grand Rapids and Muskegon to the west with Detroit on the east.
- BL I-69 is a business loop running through Lansing and East Lansing. A small portion of the route exists in southeastern Clinton County.
- BL I-96 is a business loop running through Lansing. A small portion of the route exists in southern Clinton County.
- US 127 runs north–south through the center portion of the county, serving both St. Johns and DeWitt. US 127 continues northerly toward Mt. Pleasant and Grayling, and southerly past Lansing and on toward Jackson.
- Bus. US 127 is a loop route through St. Johns.
- M-21 passes east–west through Fowler, St. Johns, Shepardsville and Ovid. M-21 provides a link to Grand Rapids, approximately 66 miles (106 km) to the west, and Flint, about 45 miles (72 km) to the east.
- M-100 has a short segment in southwestern Clinton County. From a beginning at I-69 in Eaton County, it terminates at I-96 north of Grand Ledge.

=== Airports ===
Capital Region International Airport (IATA: LAN, ICAO: KLAN, FAA LID: LAN) is a public, Class C airport located 3 miles (4.8 km) northwest of downtown Lansing, primarily in DeWitt Township. The airport accessible by Grand River Avenue (Business Route 96) and is located 1.5 miles (2.4 km) south of Interstate 69.

Abrams Municipal Airport (FAA LID: 4D0) is a city-owned, public-use airport located two nautical miles (3.7 km) north of the central business district of Grand Ledge, a city in Eaton County. The airport is accessible by road from Wright Road (M-100), and is located 2.1 miles (3.4 km) south of Interstate 96, just east of M-100.

== Government ==
United States presidential election results for Clinton County, Michigan
Year	Republican		Democratic		Third party(ies)	
Year	No.	%	No.	%	No.	%
1884	2,782	44.03%	3,220	50.96%	317	5.02%
1888	3,493	48.65%	3,248	45.24%	439	6.11%
1892	3,133	48.42%	2,756	42.60%	581	8.98%
1896	3,480	48.95%	3,467	48.76%	163	2.29%
1900	3,795	55.08%	2,928	42.50%	167	2.42%
1904	4,095	64.60%	2,068	32.62%	176	2.78%
1908	3,490	59.63%	2,188	37.38%	175	2.99%
1912	1,723	31.97%	1,723	31.97%	1,943	36.05%
1916	3,381	60.60%	2,094	37.53%	104	1.86%
1920	6,019	78.91%	1,464	19.19%	145	1.90%
1924	6,637	76.81%	1,359	15.73%	645	7.46%
1928	6,161	75.04%	2,013	24.52%	36	0.44%
1932	4,647	47.16%	5,098	51.74%	108	1.10%
1936	4,915	50.04%	4,296	43.73%	612	6.23%
1940	8,311	75.00%	2,745	24.77%	25	0.23%
1944	8,422	76.68%	2,533	23.06%	29	0.26%
1948	7,510	73.69%	2,523	24.76%	158	1.55%
1952	10,510	77.47%	2,977	21.94%	79	0.58%
1956	10,770	74.41%	3,673	25.38%	31	0.21%
1960	10,227	67.85%	4,822	31.99%	23	0.15%
1964	5,891	39.70%	8,932	60.20%	14	0.09%
1968	9,416	56.77%	5,548	33.45%	1,621	9.77%
1972	13,438	68.38%	5,870	29.87%	345	1.76%
1976	13,475	63.11%	7,549	35.35%	329	1.54%
1980	14,968	60.62%	7,539	30.53%	2,184	8.85%
1984	17,387	73.28%	6,226	26.24%	113	0.48%
1988	15,497	62.39%	9,225	37.14%	115	0.46%
1992	12,216	40.27%	10,116	33.34%	8,007	26.39%
1996	13,694	47.88%	11,945	41.76%	2,962	10.36%
2000	18,054	56.07%	13,394	41.60%	751	2.33%
2004	21,989	58.16%	15,483	40.95%	335	0.89%
2008	19,726	48.85%	20,005	49.54%	650	1.61%
2012	20,650	52.63%	18,191	46.36%	394	1.00%
2016	21,636	52.85%	16,492	40.29%	2,809	6.86%
2020	25,098	52.37%	21,968	45.84%	861	1.80%
2024	26,751	53.52%	22,450	44.91%	785	1.57%

United States Senate election results for Clinton County, Michigan1
Year	Republican		Democratic		Third party(ies)	
Year	No.	%	No.	%	No.	%
2024	25,903	52.79%	22,600	46.06%	562	1.15%

Michigan Gubernatorial election results for Clinton County
Year	Republican		Democratic		Third party(ies)	
Year	No.	%	No.	%	No.	%
2022	19,904	48.31%	20,664	50.15%	636	1.54%

The county government operates the jail, maintains rural roads, coordinates local emergency management, operates the major local courts, keeps files of deeds and mortgages, maintains vital records, administers public health regulations, and participates with the state in the provision of welfare and other social services. The county board of commissioners controls the budget but has only limited authority to make laws or ordinances. In Michigan, most local government functions — police and fire, building and zoning, tax assessment, street maintenance, etc. — are the responsibility of individual cities and townships.

=== Elected officials ===
- Prosecuting Attorney: Tony Spagnuolo
- Sheriff: Sean Dush
- County Clerk/Register of Deeds: Debra Sutherland
- County Treasurer: Steven Wiswasser
- Drain Commissioner: Phil Hanses

=== County Board of Commissioners ===
7 members, elected from districts (6 Republicans, 1 Democrat)

== Communities ==
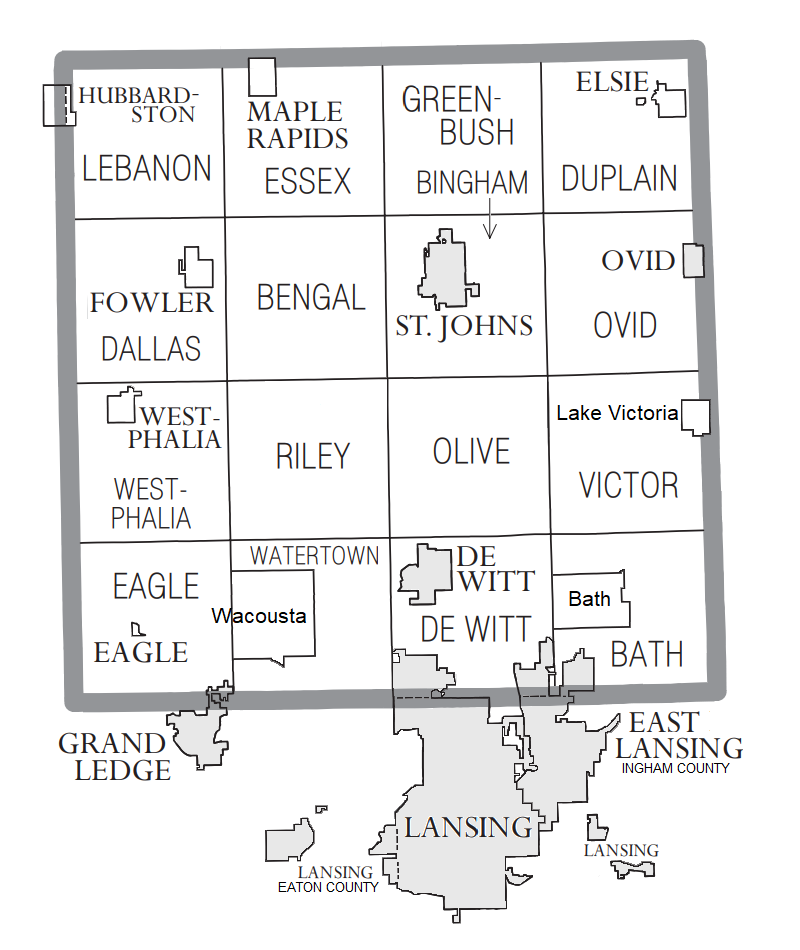
U.S. Census data map showing local municipal boundaries within Clinton County, as well as CDP boundaries and municipalities extending into neighboring counties. Shaded areas represent incorporated cities.

=== Cities ===
- DeWitt
- East Lansing (part)
- Grand Ledge (part)
- Lansing (part)
- Ovid (part)
- St. Johns (county seat)

=== Villages ===
- Eagle
- Elsie
- Fowler
- Hubbardston (part)
- Maple Rapids
- Westphalia

=== Charter townships ===
- Bath Charter Township
- DeWitt Charter Township
- Watertown Charter Township

=== Civil townships ===
- Bengal Township
- Bingham Township
- Dallas Township
- Duplain Township
- Eagle Township
- Essex Township
- Greenbush Township
- Lebanon Township
- Olive Township
- Ovid Township
- Riley Township
- Victor Township
- Westphalia Township

=== Census-designated places ===
- Bath
- Eureka
- Lake Victoria
- Wacousta

=== Other unincorporated places ===
- Gunnisonville
- Matherton (part)
- Shepardsville

== See also ==
- List of Michigan State Historic Sites in Clinton County
- National Register of Historic Places listings in Clinton County, Michigan
- St. Johns High School (Michigan)
