= List of bridges documented by the Historic American Engineering Record in Michigan =

This is a list of bridges documented by the Historic American Engineering Record in the U.S. state of Michigan.

== Bridges ==
Survey No.	Name (as assigned by HAER)	Status	Type	Built	Documented	Carries	Crosses	Location	County	Coordinates
MI-5	Spruce Street Bridge	Replaced	Pennsylvania (petit) truss	1902	1981	East Spruce Street	Power Canal	Sault Ste. Marie	Chippewa	46°29′39″N 84°20′13″W
MI-7	West Knight Street Bridge	Replaced	Pratt truss	1894	1982	West Knight Street	Spring Brook	Eaton Rapids	Eaton	42°30′46″N 84°39′27″W
MI-8	Pearl Street Bridge	Replaced	Reinforced concrete open-spandrel arch	1922	1982	Pearl Street	Grand River	Grand Rapids	Kent	42°57′59″N 85°40′31″W
MI-14	Petrieville Road Bridge	Replaced	Warren truss		1985	Petrieville Road	Grand River	Petrieville	Eaton	42°32′08″N 84°37′26″W
MI-15	Lake Street Bridge	Replaced	Stone arch	1891	1985	Lake Shore Drive	Ruddiman Creek	Muskegon	Muskegon	43°13′06″N 86°17′05″W
MI-16-A	Blue Water Bridge	Extant	Cantilever	1938	1994	I-69 / I-94 / Highway 402	St. Clair River	Port Huron, Michigan, and Sarnia, Ontario	St. Clair County, Michigan, and Lambton County, Ontario	42°59′55″N 82°25′25″W
MI-17	McCann Road Bridge	Replaced	Pratt truss	1892	1986	McCann Road	Thornapple River	Hastings	Barry	42°41′27″N 85°24′47″W
MI-18	Thirty-Sixth Street Bridge	Replaced	Parker truss	1906		Thirty-Sixth Street	Rabbit River	Hamilton	Allegan	42°42′03″N 85°53′56″W
MI-20	Ferris Road Bridge	Replaced	Warren truss	1910	1987	Ferris Road	Pine River	Sumner	Gratiot	43°17′58″N 84°48′57″W
MI-21	Cheesman Road Bridge	Replaced	Pratt truss	1886	1987	Cheesman Road	Pine River	St. Louis	Gratiot	43°24′02″N 84°36′56″W
MI-22	Cronk Road Bridge	Replaced	Pratt truss	1886	1987	Cronk Road	St. Joseph River	Litchfield	Hillsdale	42°01′23″N 84°43′44″W
MI-26	William S. Antisdale Memorial State Reward Bridge	Replaced	Steel built-up girder	1932	1988	Henry Street	Mona Lake	Norton Shores	Muskegon	43°10′41″N 86°15′49″W
MI-27	Bridge Street Bridge	Replaced	Reinforced concrete closed-spandrel arch	1904	1988	Bridge Street	Grand River	Grand Rapids	Kent	42°58′14″N 85°40′30″W
MI-28	Dehmel Road Bridge	Replaced	Pratt truss	1907	1980	Dehmel Road	Cass River	Frankenmuth	Saginaw	43°19′43″N 83°45′30″W
MI-29	Knaggs Bridge	Replaced	Pratt truss	1893	1987	Cole Road	Shiawassee River	Bancroft	Shiawassee	42°51′40″N 84°01′56″W
MI-32	Dix Bascule Bridge	Extant	Simple trunnion bascule	1926	1989	Dix Avenue	River Rouge	Detroit	Wayne	42°17′47″N 83°09′03″W
MI-33	F Drive North Bridge	Relocated?	Pratt truss	1905	1988	F Drive North	Kalamazoo River	Marshall	Calhoun	42°17′25″N 85°06′58″W
MI-34	Trunk Line Bridge	Replaced	Pratt truss	1915	1989	Griswold Road	Pine River	Kimball	St. Clair	42°57′42″N 82°36′12″W
MI-35	Monroe Street Bridge	Replaced	Reinforced concrete girder	1929	1989	M-125 (Monroe Street)	River Raisin	Monroe	Monroe	41°55′03″N 83°23′49″W
MI-36	Mosel Avenue Grade Separation	Demolished	Reinforced concrete girder	1924	1989	Mosel Avenue	Riverview Drive	Kalamazoo	Kalamazoo	42°19′04″N 85°34′15″W
MI-37	Mosel Avenue Bridge	Replaced	Reinforced concrete girder	1924	1989	Mosel Avenue	Kalamazoo River	Kalamazoo	Kalamazoo	42°19′04″N 85°34′23″W
MI-38	Military Street Bridge	Extant	Multiple trunnion (Strauss) bascule	1913	1990	Military Street	Black River	Port Huron	St. Clair	42°58′32″N 82°25′28″W
MI-39	Sheridan Road Bridge	Replaced	Pratt truss	1923	1989	Sheridan Road	Flint River	Taymouth	Saginaw	43°17′59″N 83°55′57″W
MI-41	Bridge Street Bridge	Extant	Pratt truss	1890	1990	Bridge Street	Grand River	Portland	Ionia	42°52′11″N 84°54′15″W
MI-42	South Euclid Road Bridge	Replaced	Steel rolled stringer	1900	1990	South Euclid Road	Squaconning (Dutch) Creek	Bay City	Bay	43°33′26″N 83°54′58″W
MI-43	Cambria Road Bridge	Replaced	Pratt truss	1899	1989	Cambria Road	St. Joseph River West Branch, East Fork	Camden	Hillsdale	41°45′01″N 84°40′11″W
MI-44	Morton's Highway Crossing	Replaced	Reinforced concrete through arch	1904	1990	O Avenue	Amtrak	Oshtemo	Kalamazoo	42°13′48″N 85°45′33″W
MI-46	State Route M-139 Bridge	Replaced	Viaduct	1936	1990	M-139	Ox Creek	Fair Plain	Berrien	42°05′58″N 86°26′04″W
MI-47	North Park Bridge	Replaced	Pratt truss	1903	1990	North Park Street	Grand River	Grand Rapids	Kent	43°01′23″N 85°39′42″W
MI-48	Grand River Avenue Bridge	Replaced	Reinforced concrete through arch	1925	1991	US 16 (Grand River Avenue)	Chesapeake and Ohio Railway	Novi	Oakland	42°28′56″N 83°28′55″W
MI-50	Burt Road Bridge	Replaced	Pratt truss	1897	1990	Burt Road	St. Joseph River West Branch, East Fork	Hillsdale	Hillsdale	41°46′03″N 84°39′09″W
MI-62	Mills Street Bridge	Replaced	Reinforced concrete closed-spandrel arch	1912	1992	Mills Street	Kalamazoo River	Kalamazoo	Kalamazoo	42°17′35″N 85°33′59″W
MI-63	Gull Street Bridge	Replaced	Reinforced concrete closed-spandrel arch	1911	1992	Gull Road	Kalamazoo River	Kalamazoo	Kalamazoo	42°17′56″N 85°34′20″W
MI-64	Horton Road Bridge	Replaced	Parker truss	1900	1989	Horton Road	Black Creek	Adrian	Lenawee	41°48′01″N 83°59′27″W
MI-65	West Michigan Avenue Bridge	Replaced	Reinforced concrete closed-spandrel arch	1903	1992	West Michigan Avenue	Battle Creek River	Battle Creek	Calhoun	42°19′22″N 85°11′09″W
MI-66	Belleville Road Bridge	Relocated	Parker truss	1925	1992	Burroughs Drive	Flat River	Lowell	Kent	42°57′57″N 85°21′04″W
MI-69	East Cass Street Bridge	Replaced	Stone arch	1896	1992	East Cass Street	Kalamazoo River	Albion	Calhoun	42°14′43″N 84°45′08″W
MI-72	Burroughs Street Bridge	Relocated	Warren truss	1905	1993	Portland Riverwalk	Looking Glass River	Portland	Ionia	42°52′14″N 84°53′56″W
MI-73	Sturgeon Road Bridge	Replaced	Pratt truss	1910	1994	Sturgeon Road	Sturgeon River	Baraga	Baraga	46°51′59″N 88°32′25″W
MI-74	Limerick Road Bridge	Replaced	Pratt truss	1900	1995	Limerick Road	Pigeon River	Caseville	Huron	43°55′02″N 83°14′36″W
MI-75	East Michigan Avenue Bridge	Replaced	Reinforced concrete through arch	1923	1994	East Michigan Avenue	Kalamazoo River north branch	Galesburg	Kalamazoo	42°17′19″N 85°24′06″W
MI-77	Fourteen Mile Road Bridge	Replaced	Parker truss	1906	1990	Fourteen Mile Road	St. Joseph River	Tekonsha	Calhoun	42°05′25″N 85°01′14″W
MI-78	North Bridge	Replaced	Reinforced concrete girder		1994	Lakeside Drive	River Rouge, Quarton Lake branch	Birmingham	Oakland	42°33′28″N 83°13′34″W
MI-79	South Bridge	Replaced	Reinforced concrete girder		1994	Lakeside Drive	River Rouge, Quarton Lake branch	Birmingham	Oakland	42°33′16″N 83°13′34″W
MI-82	Shiawassee Street Bridge	Replaced	Reinforced concrete closed-spandrel arch	1923	1994	Shiawassee Street	Grand River	Lansing	Ingham	42°44′14″N 84°32′57″W
MI-83	Twenty-Four Mile Road Bridge	Replaced	Reinforced concrete closed-spandrel arch	1909	1994	Twenty-Four Mile Road	Clinton River north branch	Chesterfield	Macomb	42°41′17″N 82°52′47″W
MI-84	Twenty-Four Mile Road Overflow Bridge	Replaced	Reinforced concrete closed-spandrel arch	1912	1994	Twenty-Four Mile Road	Clinton River north branch overflow	Chesterfield	Macomb	42°41′17″N 82°52′55″W
MI-85	Grassmere Road Bridge	Replaced	Pratt truss	1910	1995	Grassmere Road	Pinnebog River	Caseville	Huron	43°57′03″N 83°07′36″W
MI-89	Genesee Road Bridge	Replaced	Reinforced concrete through arch	1928	1995	Genesee Road	Grand Trunk Western Railroad	Lapeer	Lapeer	43°02′20″N 83°22′33″W
MI-90	South Main Street Bridge	Replaced	Reinforced concrete closed-spandrel arch	1907	1996	South Main Street	South Mill Race	Eaton Rapids	Eaton	42°30′32″N 84°39′22″W
MI-91	Tallman Road Bridge	Replaced	Pratt truss	1880	1995	Tallman Road	Looking Glass River	Eagle	Clinton	42°49′40″N 84°45′34″W
MI-94	Mason Road Bridge	Replaced	Pratt truss	1904	1995	Mason Road	Bad River	Ithaca	Gratiot	43°18′51″N 84°23′22″W
MI-96	Custer Road Bridge	Replaced	Warren truss	1905	1995	Custer Road	Black River drain	Carsonville	Sanilac	43°27′10″N 82°45′11″W
MI-97-A	Willow Run Expressway Bridge No. R01	Replaced	Reinforced concrete girder	1941	1995	US 12 (Willow Run Expressway)	Conrail	Ypsilanti	Washtenaw	42°14′39″N 83°33′34″W
MI-97-B	Willow Run Expressway Bridge No. R02	Extant	Reinforced concrete girder	1941	1995	US 12 (Willow Run Expressway)	Conrail	Ypsilanti	Washtenaw	42°14′50″N 83°33′37″W
MI-101	Lyter Road Bridge	Replaced	Steel built-up girder	1915	1994	Lyter Road	Little Swan Creek	Bronson	Branch	41°55′28″N 85°15′48″W
MI-102	Inselrue Bridge	Replaced	Steel built-up girder	1902	1996	Inselruhe Avenue	Nashua Canal	Detroit	Wayne	42°20′09″N 82°59′03″W
MI-103-B	Davison Freeway from M-10 to Oakland Avenue, Hamilton Avenue Bridge	Replaced	Reinforced concrete rigid frame	1942	1996	Hamilton Avenue	M-8 (Davison Freeway)	Highland Park	Wayne	42°24′01″N 83°06′17″W
MI-103-C	Davison Freeway from M-10 to Oakland Avenue, Third Avenue Bridge	Replaced	Reinforced concrete rigid frame	1942	1996	Third Avenue	M-8 (Davison Freeway)	Highland Park	Wayne	42°24′04″N 83°06′06″W
MI-103-D	Davison Freeway from M-10 to Oakland Avenue, Second Avenue Bridge	Replaced	Reinforced concrete rigid frame	1942	1996	Second Avenue	M-8 (Davison Freeway)	Highland Park	Wayne	42°24′08″N 83°05′57″W
MI-103-E	Davison Freeway from M-10 to Oakland Avenue, Woodward Avenue Bridge	Replaced	Reinforced concrete rigid frame	1942	1996	M-1 (Woodward Avenue)	M-8 (Davison Freeway)	Highland Park	Wayne	42°24′12″N 83°05′44″W
MI-103-F	Davison Freeway from M-10 to Oakland Avenue, John R. Street Bridge	Replaced	Reinforced concrete rigid frame	1942	1996	John R. Street	M-8 (Davison Freeway)	Highland Park	Wayne	42°24′16″N 83°05′33″W
MI-103-G	Davison Freeway from M-10 to Oakland Avenue, Brush Street Bridge	Demolished	Reinforced concrete rigid frame	1942	1996	Brush Street	M-8 (Davison Freeway)	Highland Park	Wayne	42°24′20″N 83°05′23″W
MI-104	South County Line Road Bridge	Replaced	Pratt truss	1880	1995	South County Line Road	Flat River	Greenville	Montcalm	43°07′11″N 85°13′27″W
MI-105	Shaytown Road Bridge	Replaced	Warren truss	1913	1995	Shaytown Road	Thornapple River	Vermontville	Eaton	42°37′10″N 84°58′32″W
MI-106	Twenty Mile Road Bridge	Replaced	Pratt truss	1906	1995	Twenty Mile Road	St. Joseph River	Tekonsha	Calhoun	42°07′39″N 84°54′18″W
MI-107	One Hundred Thirty-Third Avenue Bridge	Replaced	Pratt truss	1897	1995	133rd Avenue	Rabbit River	Hopkins	Allegan	42°39′37″N 85°44′48″W
MI-108	Scott Highway Bridge	Replaced	Pratt truss	1897	1995	Scott Highway	Black Creek	Blissfield	Lenawee	41°48′44″N 83°56′46″W
MI-109	Ridgeville Road Bridge	Replaced	Pratt truss	1902	1989	Ridgeville Road	Bean Creek	Morenci	Lenawee	41°45′18″N 84°13′55″W
MI-110	Cottrell Road Bridge	Replaced	Trestle	1900	1996	Cottrell Road	CSX Transportation	Vassar	Tuscola	43°22′06″N 83°36′17″W
MI-111	Bellevue Road Bridge	Replaced	Reinforced concrete closed-spandrel arch	1929	1995	Bellevue Avenue	Lake Orion	Lake Orion	Oakland	42°46′49″N 83°15′09″W
MI-113	Old US 131 Bridge	Replaced	Steel built-up girder	1930	1996	US 131	Muskegon River	Mecosta	Mecosta	43°36′28″N 85°28′50″W
MI-114	Spalding Bridge	Relocated	Pratt truss	1918	1996	US 41	Big Cedar River	Spalding	Menominee	45°41′42″N 87°30′53″W
MI-115-A	Veterans Memorial Park & Parkway, M-120 Northbound Bridge	Replaced	Steel rolled stringer	1931	1996	M-120 (Veterans Memorial Parkway)	Muskegon River	Muskegon	Muskegon	43°15′47″N 86°14′43″W
MI-115-B	Veterans Memorial Park & Parkway, M-120 Southbound Bridge	Replaced	Steel rolled stringer	1931	1996	M-120 (Veterans Memorial Parkway)	Muskegon River	Muskegon	Muskegon	43°15′44″N 86°14′48″W
MI-117	Morse Near Bridge	Replaced	Warren truss	1909	1996	96th Avenue	Pentwater River north branch	Pentwater	Oceana	43°48′11″N 86°19′05″W
MI-120	Comstock Road Bridge	Replaced	Reinforced concrete closed-spandrel arch	1923	1995	Comstock Road	Black River	Yale	St. Clair	43°07′23″N 82°37′01″W
MI-125	Jones Road Bridge	Replaced	Baltimore truss	1912	1995	Jones Road	Grand River	Eagle	Clinton	42°47′32″N 84°49′5″W
MI-126	Hemlock Road Bridge	Replaced	Parker truss	1920	1995	Hemlock Road	Bad River north branch	Brant	Saginaw	43°17′49″N 84°13′46″W
MI-127	Parshallburg Bridge	Destroyed	Thacher truss	1889	1995	Ditch Road	Shiawassee River	Chesaning	Saginaw	43°08′38″N 84°08′07″W
MI-321	Mansfield Street Viaduct	Demolished	Reinforced concrete girder		1989	Mansfield Street		Ironwood	Gogebic	46°27′34″N 90°09′49″W
MI-324	Sault Ste. Marie International Railroad Bridge	Extant	Swing span	1887	2002	Canadian National Railway	St. Marys River	Sault Ste. Marie, Michigan, and Sault Ste. Marie, Ontario	Chippewa County, Michigan, and Algoma District, Ontario	46°30′27″N 84°21′43″W
MI-329	Mackinac Straits Suspension Bridge	Extant	Suspension	1957	2000	I-75 / GLCT	Straits of Mackinac	Mackinaw City and St. Ignace	Cheboygan and Mackinac	45°49′01″N 84°43′40″W
MI-331	White's Bridge	Reconstructed	Brown truss	1869	2004	White's Bridge Road	Flat River	Smyrna	Ionia	43°00′53″N 85°17′52″W
MI-346	Railroad Overpass	Extant	Steel built-up girder		2003	Michigan Central Railroad and Grand Trunk Railway	Hastings Street	Detroit	Wayne	42°22′21″N 83°03′46″W
MI-354	Railroad Overpass	Extant	Steel built-up girder		2003		Brush Street	Detroit	Wayne	42°22′11″N 83°04′02″W
WI-60	Wisconsin-Michigan Railroad Bridge	Replaced	Pratt truss	1894	1989	CTH-JJ	Menominee River	Koss, Michigan, and Wagner, Wisconsin	Menominee County, Michigan, and Marinette County, Wisconsin	45°23′13″N 87°42′06″W
WI-80	Menominee River Bridge	Replaced	Reinforced concrete girder	1927	1994	Chalk Hill Road	Menominee River	Holmes Township, Michigan, and Amberg, Wisconsin	Menominee County, Michigan, and Marinette County, Wisconsin	45°30′44″N 87°48′06″W
