= Wacousta, Michigan =

- Census-designated place (CDP) & unincorporated community
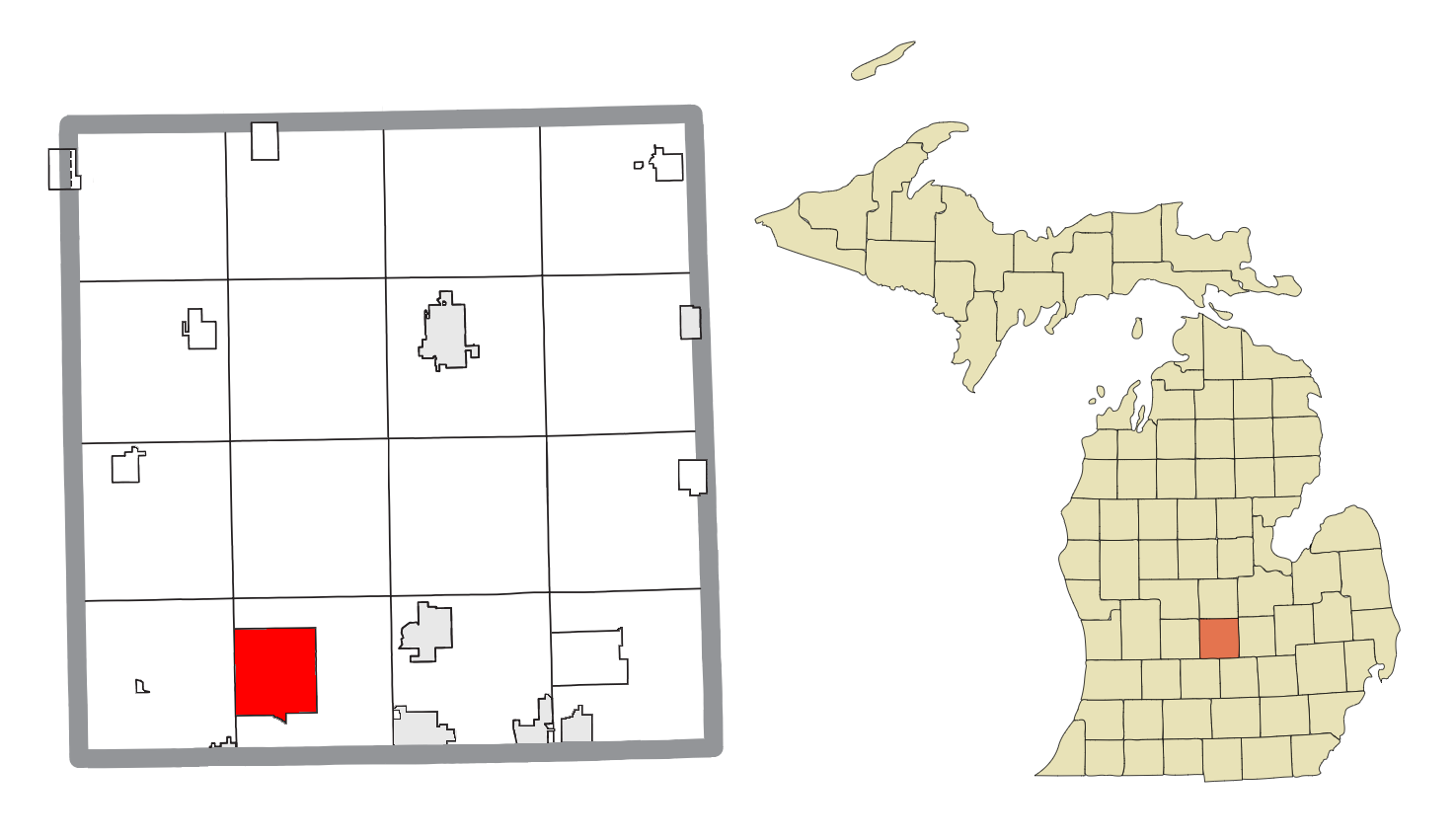
- Location within Clinton County

- Location within the state of Michigan Location within the United States
- Coordinates: 42°49′13″N 84°41′27″W
- Country: United States
- State: Michigan
- County: Clinton
- Township: Watertown

Area
  - Total: 8.99 sq mi (23.29 km^{2})
  - Land: 8.92 sq mi (23.09 km^{2})
  - Water: 0.077 sq mi (0.20 km^{2})
- Elevation: 824 ft (251 m)

Population (2020)
  - Total: 1,532
  - Density: 171.8/sq mi (66.35/km^{2})
- Time zone: UTC-5 (Eastern (EST))
  - Summer (DST): UTC-4 (EDT)
- ZIP code(s): 48820 (DeWitt); 48822 (Eagle); 48837 (Grand Ledge)
- Area code: 517
- FIPS code: 26-82680
- GNIS feature ID: 2583768

Wacousta (/wəˈkuːstə/ wə-COOS-tə) is an unincorporated community and census-designated place (CDP) in Clinton County in the U.S. state of Michigan. The CDP is located within Watertown Charter Township. As of the 2020 census, it had a population of 1,532.

== History ==
The community of Wacousta was listed as a newly-organized census-designated place for the 2010 census, meaning it now has officially defined boundaries and population statistics for the first time.

Township date of Organization: March 20, 1837

Recognized as a Charter Township: December 8, 1966

In the heart of Michigan, along the winding Looking Glass River, a pioneering spirit took root. In 1837, a group of visionaries, drawn to the river's potential for water power, formed the Waterloo Joint Stock Company. Their ambitious goal was to establish a thriving community centered around a sawmill and gristmill.

The company purchased a substantial tract of land and began construction. A sawmill, gristmill, dwellings, and even a store soon materialized. However, the ambitious scale of their project outpaced the local population's needs, leading to financial difficulties. The property eventually changed hands several times, ultimately landing in the hands of Nathaniel I. Daniells.

Daniells, a New York native with a history of entrepreneurial ventures, saw potential in Wacousta. He purchased half of the property and leased the other half, becoming a pivotal figure in the town's development. His arrival marked a turning point, as he brought his determination and business acumen to the fledgling community.

Despite facing legal challenges and community resistance, Daniells persevered. He repaired the sawmill, established a gristmill, and played a key role in the town's growth. His efforts helped to attract other settlers and businesses, contributing to Wacousta's transformation into a thriving community.

Over the years, Wacousta continued to evolve. New industries emerged, including blacksmith shops and medical practices. The town also became a hub for local agriculture and commerce. Through the dedication and resilience of its early pioneers, Wacousta established itself as a cornerstone of the region's history.

== Geography ==
The Wacousta CDP has a total area of 8.99 square miles (23.28 km^{2}), of which 8.91 square miles (23.08 km^{2}) is land and 0.08 square miles (0.21 km^{2}) (0.89%) is water.

The Looking Glass River flows from east to west across the CDP.

== Demographics ==
Historical population
Census	Pop.	Note	%±
2020	1,532		—
U.S. Decennial Census

=== 2020 census ===
As of the 2020 census, Wacousta had a population of 1,532. The median age was 48.2 years. 21.2% of residents were under the age of 18 and 20.7% of residents were 65 years of age or older. For every 100 females there were 100.8 males, and for every 100 females age 18 and over there were 98.8 males age 18 and over.

0.0% of residents lived in urban areas, while 100.0% lived in rural areas.

There were 595 households in Wacousta, of which 28.4% had children under the age of 18 living in them. Of all households, 71.8% were married-couple households, 11.6% were households with a male householder and no spouse or partner present, and 12.6% were households with a female householder and no spouse or partner present. About 16.8% of all households were made up of individuals and 10.6% had someone living alone who was 65 years of age or older.

There were 615 housing units, of which 3.3% were vacant. The homeowner vacancy rate was 1.2% and the rental vacancy rate was 0.0%.

Racial composition as of the 2020 census
Race	Number	Percent
White	1,429	93.3%
Black or African American	5	0.3%
American Indian and Alaska Native	5	0.3%
Asian	22	1.4%
Native Hawaiian and Other Pacific Islander	0	0.0%
Some other race	11	0.7%
Two or more races	60	3.9%
Hispanic or Latino (of any race)	63	4.1%
