= Portland Downtown Historic District =

- U.S. National Register of Historic Places
- U.S. Historic district
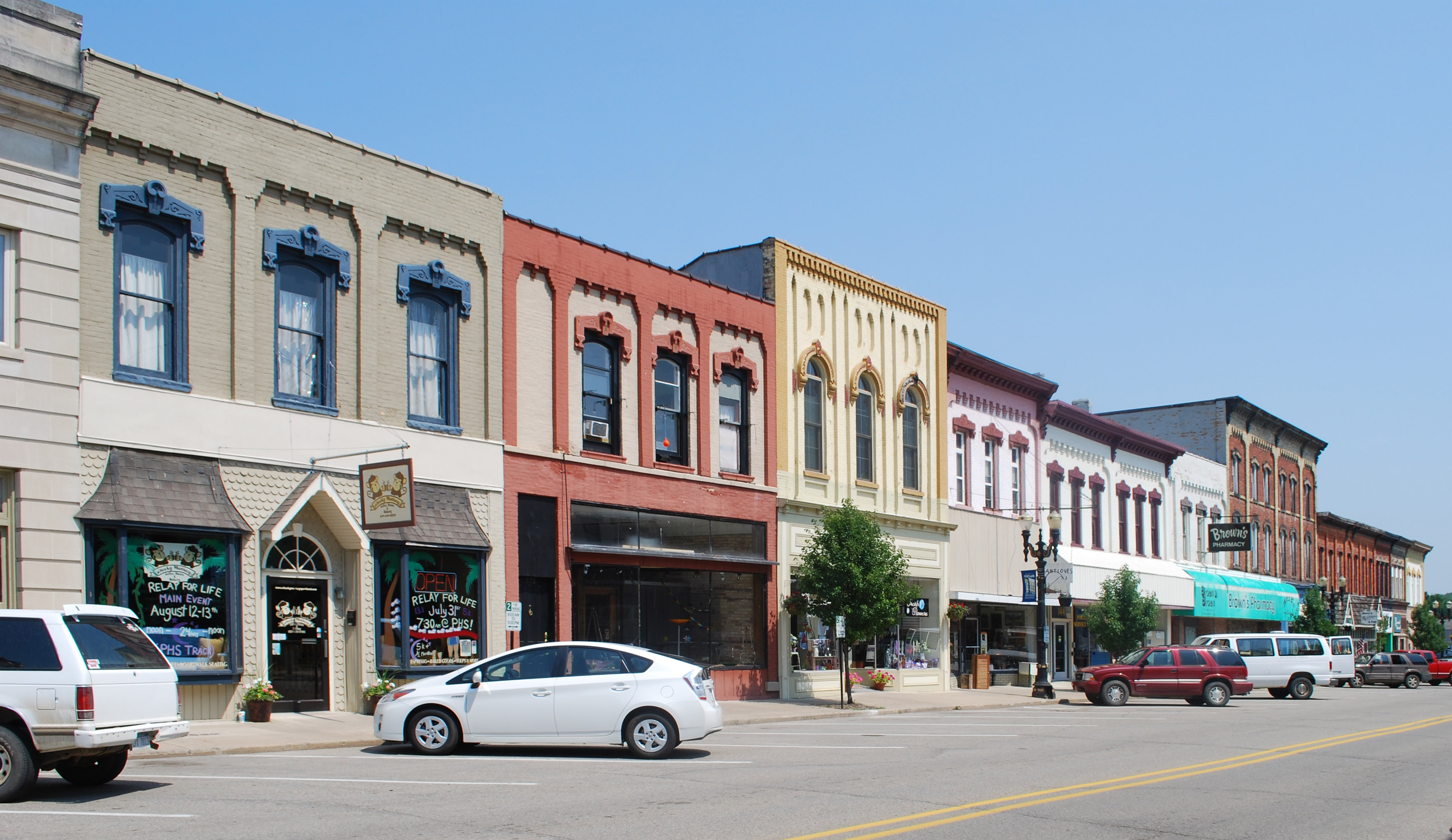
- Kent Street, looking NE from Bridge

- Location within Michigan Location within the United States
- Interactive map
- Location: Kent, Bridge, Maple Sts., Grand River Ave., Portland, Michigan
- Coordinates: 42°52′9″N 84°54′11″W
- Area: 11 acres (4.5 ha)
- Built: 1872
- Architect: Williamson & Crow; et al.
- Architectural style: Italianate, Classical Revival
- NRHP reference No.: 05000153
- Added to NRHP: May 18, 2005

The Portland Downtown Historic District is a primarily commercial historic district located along Kent and Maple Streets, between Academy Street and the Looking Glass River, in Portland, Michigan. It was listed on the National Register of Historic Places in 2005.

== History ==
Portland was first settled in the 1830s. Milling operations began along the Looking Glass River near this district in 1836, and the first portion of the village of Portland was platted in 1837. The section of Portland encompassing the business district was platted in 1838. Around the same time, the first building in the district was erected by William R. Churchill at what is now the east corner of Kent and Bridge Streets. The building was soon occupied by Joshua Boyer, who opened the Mansion House, a tavern and hotel. Some additional buildings were constructed in the district in the 1840s, as well as a bridge across the Grand River, and more at the village grew in the 1850s; although documentation is sparse, it is clear that by the late 1860s that Portland had a substantial business district.

In 1869, the first railroad (what was later the Detroit, Lansing and Northern Railroad) was constructed through Portland, and with it came a rush of prosperity. The three-story Knox & White block opened in the downtown, marking the start of a building boom that saw the downtown transformed. The oldest still extant buildings, the Bowser Brothers Building at 160 Kent, and two wooden buildings at 143 and 147 Kent, were constructed in 1872. Major fires in 1872 and 1877 destroyed many of the older wooden buildings, and in 1877 the village mandated that further construction within the district be brick. These fires, along with later ones in 1879 and 1885, made way for the new Victorian construction on the commercial district.

Portland's population growth slowed after 1880, but the business district slowly grew, extending southwestward down Kent Street to Academy by the late 1910s. Many older buildings had street-front renovations in the first few decades of the 20th century. In 1919 and 1920, Grand River Avenue was developed as an automotive trunkline connecting Grand Rapids and Lansing, and the section running through Portland was redeveloped from liveries and blacksmith shops to new automobile-related businesses. However, the onset of the Great Depression halted building in the village. After World War II, more of the commercial buildings in the district were refurbished, and some new construction took place, notably the 1948-49 Sun Theatre at 227 Maple Street. However, most of the district retains a late-nineteenth century ambiance.

== Description ==
The Portland Downtown Historic District includes most of Portland's central business district. It contains 49 buildings, as well as the 1890 Bridge Street bridge. Many of the buildings are late Victorian commercial blocks constructed in the 1870s and 80s. However, the district is notable for the variety of buildings present, including modernized wooden falsefront buildings, the brick Late Victorian blocks, a Neoclassical bank, early 20th century Commercial Brick buildings, a Moderne movie theater, and an International Style bank.

Significant structures in the district include:

- Bridge Street Bridge: Built in 1890 by the Groton Bridge and Manufacturing Company, the bridge is a two-span metal Pratt through truss structure with pinned connections. It is 210 feet in length and 24 in width, with a sidewalk. The bridge was rehabilitated in 1990, and is still open to traffic.
- William R. Churchill House/Neller Funeral Home (210 Bridge): This two-story hip-roof frame Italianate house was constructed in the 1860s for one of Portland's first businessman, William R. Churchill. It was converted into a funeral parlor in 1932.
- Opera House Block (136 Kent): This three-story two-storefront building was constructed in 1880. The facade is of red brick, with five yellow-buff brick piers running the full height of the building. The second floor contains the opera house and ticket booth, with a flight of stairs up to the balcony. The Opera House is unique in that it was constructed and remained part of two separate legal parcels, each parcel being 1/2 of the Opera House and Stage. Through the years, its use was discontinued, and because the room had been owned by two separate businesses for almost 130 years, any efforts at rehabilitation, restoration or use had fallen through. In 2017, a local real estate developer, Tim Fuller acquired both parcels (that account for both the north and south half of the room) and for the first time ever in its history, the Opera House was now entirely owned by a single entity, Opera Block Properties, Inc. Opera Block Properties then acquired an additional 4 parcels adjacent to the Opera House, which were necessary for the rehabilitation of the Opera House space. Restoration was begun in 2017 on the Portland Opera Block occupying buildings from 118 Kent through 140 Kent. In 2019, Fuller created and launched Opera Block Performing Arts, Inc at 140 Kent which trains students in the arts, and will use the Opera House as a performance venue when its completed in approximately 2025. Fuller plans to host weddings, corporate events, musicians, and theater productions in the space in the coming years.
- Bowser Brothers Block (160 Kent): This two-story brick Italianate commercial building was built in 1872, and is the oldest solid brick-wall building in Portland's business district.
- Doctors' Offices (226 Kent): This one-story wooden commercial building with false front was constructed in the late 1870s.
- Decker (Powers) Building (131 Kent): This two-story frame gable-front building was constructed in the 1860s/70s, and is likely the oldest commercial building in the downtown. During the 1900 and 1913 timeframe the building housed what may have been Portland's first movie theater.
- Maynard-Allen State Bank (175 Kent): Built in 1950/51, this is a two-story International Style commercial building produced by renovating two earlier buildings.
- Sun Theater (227 Maple): This rectangular concrete and cinder block Moderne movie theater building was built in 1948/49. It is a highly intact example of the simple Moderne movie theaters once common in Michigan.

== Gallery ==
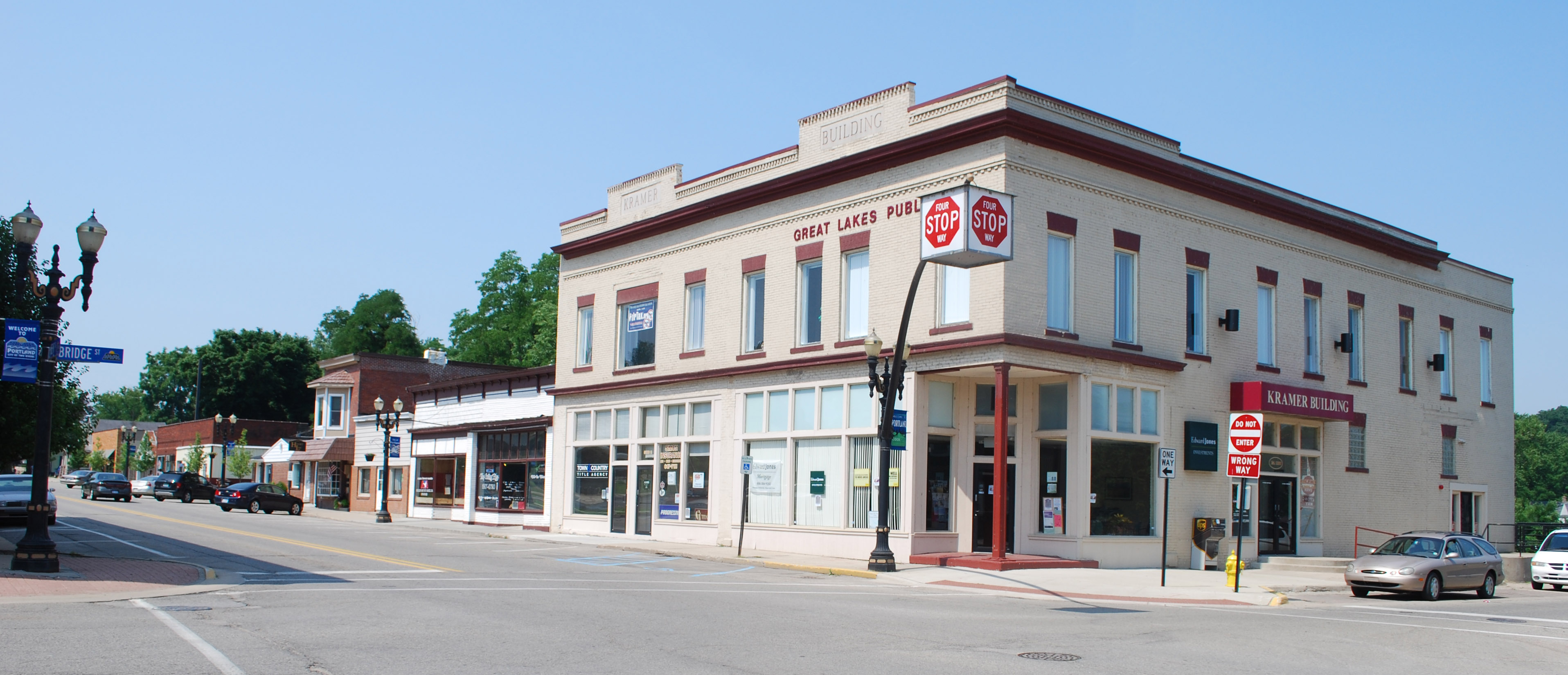
Kent Street, looking SW from Bridge

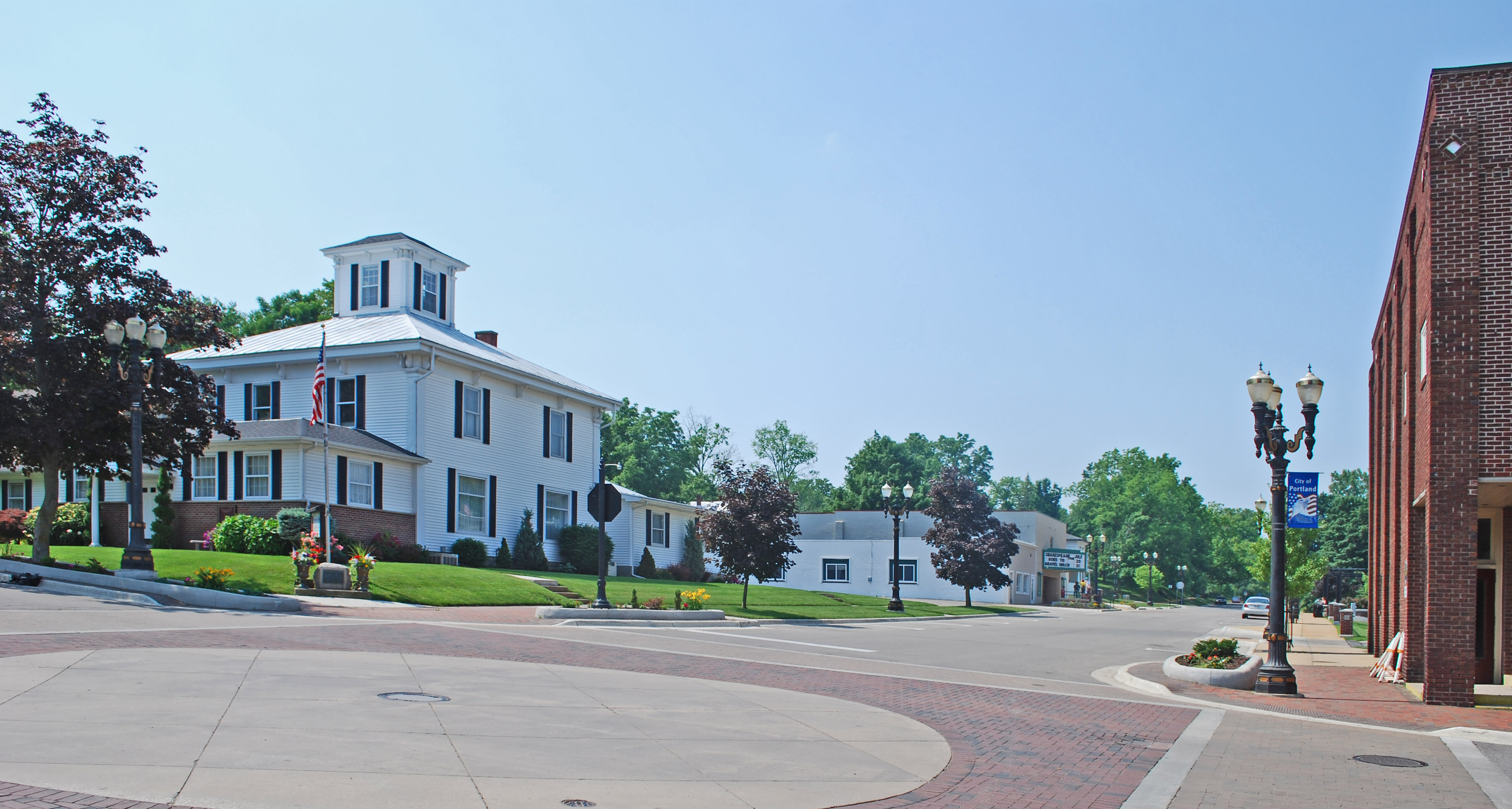
Maple Street, looking SW from Bridge
