= Eagle Township, Michigan =

- Civil township
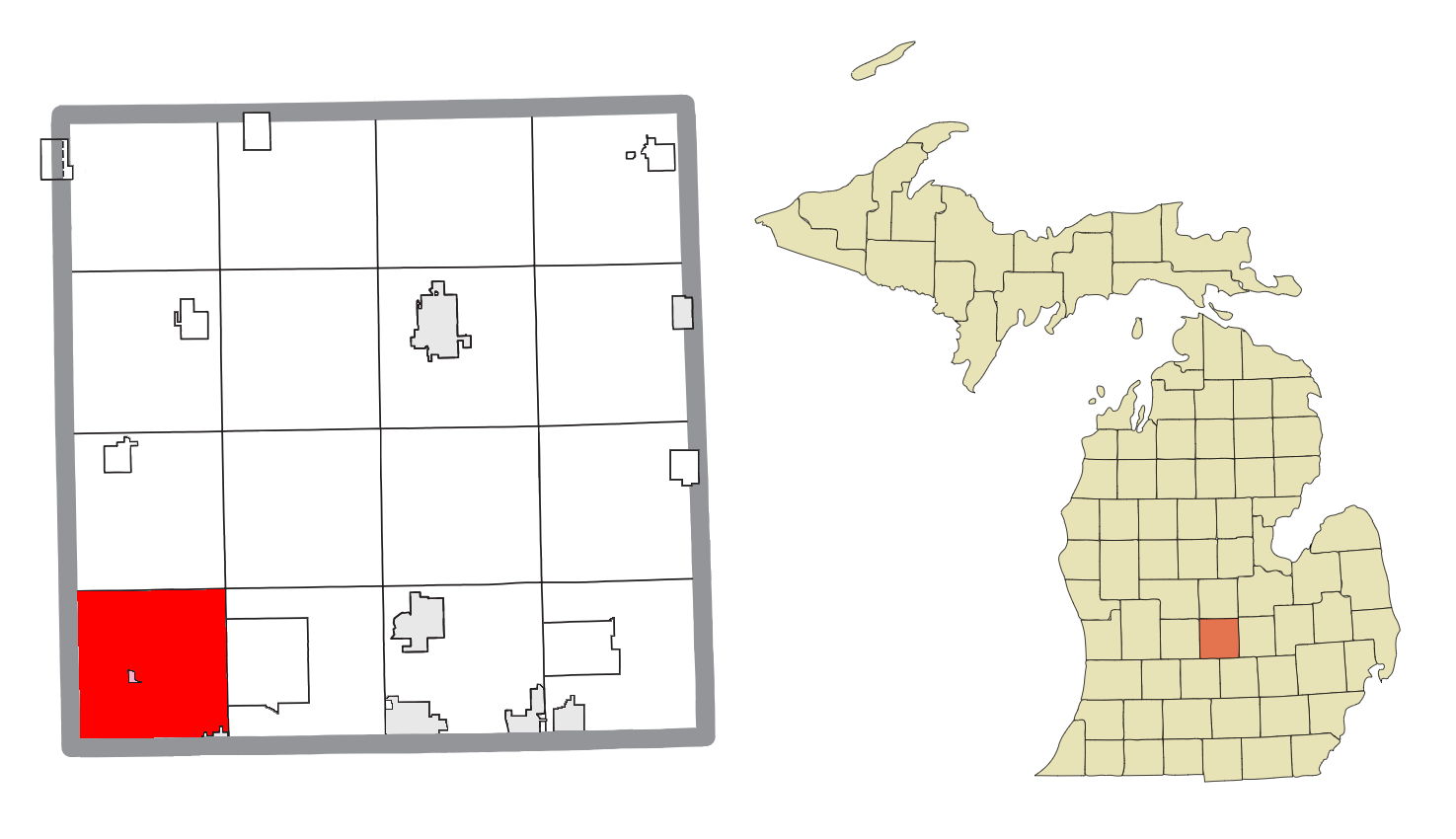
- Location within Clinton County (red) and the administered village of Eagle (pink)

- Location within the state of Michigan Location within the United States
- Coordinates: 42°48′35″N 84°47′01″W
- Country: United States
- State: Michigan
- County: Clinton
- Established: 1842

Government
  - Supervisor: Patti Schafer
  - Clerk: Starr Wirth

Area
  - Total: 35.38 sq mi (91.63 km^{2})
  - Land: 34.74 sq mi (89.98 km^{2})
  - Water: 0.64 sq mi (1.66 km^{2})
- Elevation: 833 ft (254 m)

Population (2020)
  - Total: 2,776
  - Density: 79.90/sq mi (30.85/km^{2})
- Time zone: UTC-5 (Eastern (EST))
  - Summer (DST): UTC-4 (EDT)
- ZIP code(s): 48822 (Eagle); 48837 (Grand Ledge); 48875 (Portland)
- Area code: 517
- FIPS code: 26-23580
- GNIS feature ID: 1626200
- Website: Official website

Eagle Township is a civil township of Clinton County in the U.S. state of Michigan. The population was 2,776 at the 2020 census.

== Communities ==
- The village of Eagle is within the township near Interstate 96.
- A portion of the city of Grand Ledge is at the southeast corner of the township. Although the city is administratively autonomous, development from the city extends into the adjacent township.

== Geography ==
According to the United States Census Bureau, the township has a total area of 35.38 square miles (91.63 km^{2}), of which 34.74 square miles (89.98 km^{2}) is land and 0.64 square miles (1.66 km^{2}) (1.80%) is water.

The Grand River flows across the southwest part of the township, and the Looking Glass River, a tributary of the Grand, flows from east to west across the northern part of the township. Eagle Township is located in the southwest corner of Clinton County and is bordered by Ionia County to the west and Eaton County to the south.

=== Major highways ===
- I-96 is an east-west freeway that runs through the township.
- M-100 is a north–south highway with its northern terminus at I-96 in the southeast of the township.

== Demographics ==
As of the census of 2000, there were 2,332 people, 848 households, and 689 families residing in the township. The population density was 66.5 inhabitants per square mile (25.7/km^{2}). There were 870 housing units at an average density of 24.8 per square mile (9.6/km^{2}). The racial makeup of the township was 98.24% White, 0.17% African American, 0.21% Native American, 0.30% Asian, 0.56% from other races, and 0.51% from two or more races. Hispanic or Latino of any race were 2.23% of the population.

There were 848 households, out of which 36.3% had children under the age of 18 living with them, 74.2% were married couples living together, 4.0% had a female householder with no husband present, and 18.8% were non-families. 15.0% of all households were made up of individuals, and 4.1% had someone living alone who was 65 years of age or older. The average household size was 2.75 and the average family size was 3.06.

In the township the population was spread out, with 26.8% under the age of 18, 5.5% from 18 to 24, 28.3% from 25 to 44, 28.8% from 45 to 64, and 10.7% who were 65 years of age or older. The median age was 40 years. For every 100 females, there were 103.3 males. For every 100 females age 18 and over, there were 102.9 males.

The median income for a household in the township was $61,129, and the median income for a family was $67,847. Males had a median income of $46,607 versus $34,063 for females. The per capita income for the township was $32,160. None of the families and 1.0% of the population were living below the poverty line, including no under eighteens and 1.4% of those over 64.
