= Shiawassee =

Shiawassee may refer to:

- Shiawassee County, Michigan
- Shiawassee Township, Michigan
- Shiawassee National Wildlife Refuge
- Shiawassee River
