= Watertown Charter Township, Michigan =

Watertown Township, Michigan
- Charter township
- Watertown Charter Township
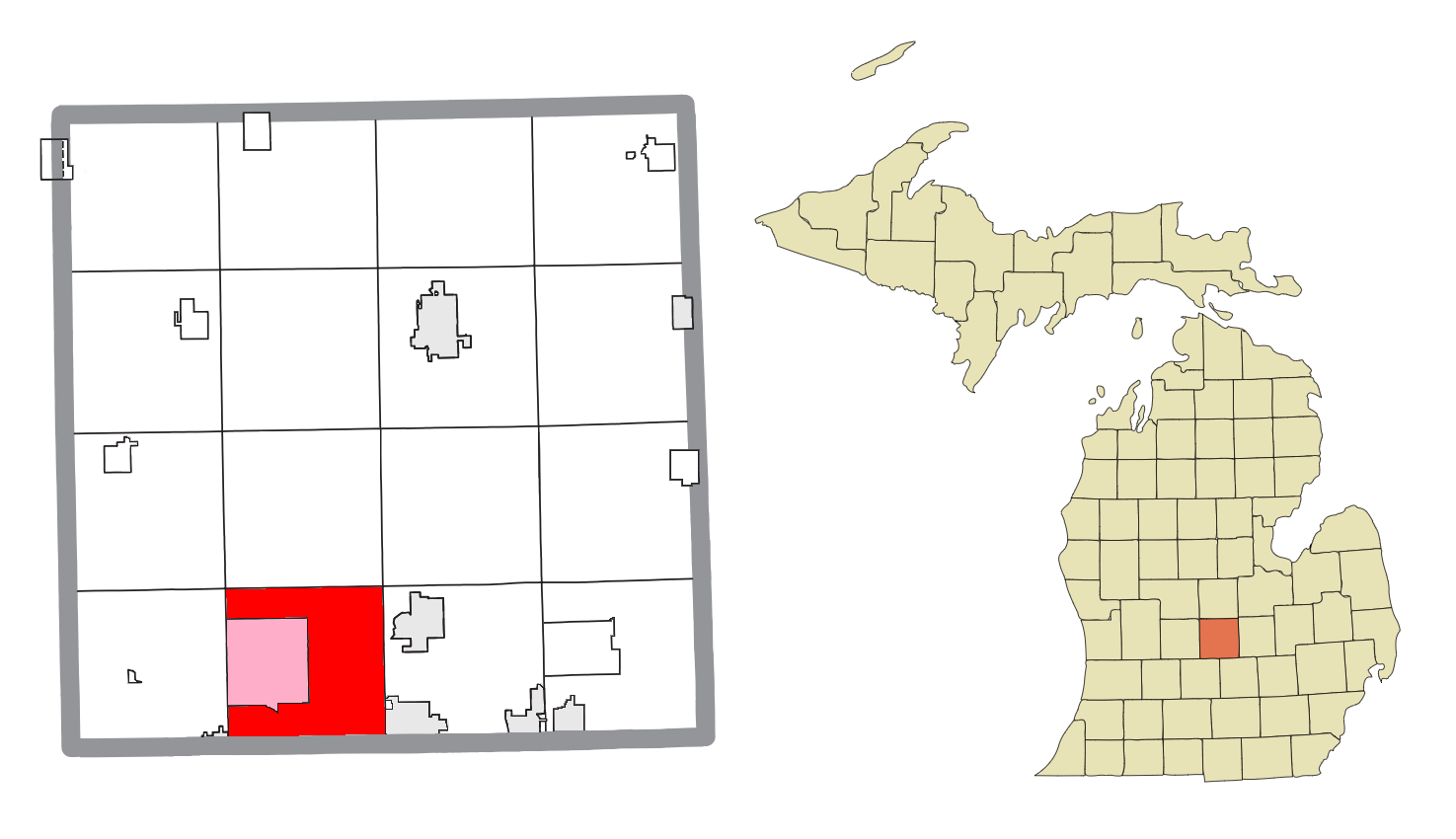
- Location within Clinton County (red) and the administered CDP of Wacousta (pink)

- Location within the state of Michigan Location within the United States
- Coordinates: 42°48′30″N 84°39′17″W
- Country: United States
- State: Michigan
- County: Clinton
- Established: 1837

Government
  - Supervisor: John Maahs
  - Clerk: Deborah Adams

Area
  - Total: 35.72 sq mi (92.51 km^{2})
  - Land: 35.51 sq mi (91.97 km^{2})
  - Water: 0.21 sq mi (0.54 km^{2})
- Elevation: 827 ft (252 m)

Population (2020)
  - Total: 5,563
  - Density: 156.7/sq mi (60.49/km^{2})
- Time zone: UTC-5 (Eastern (EST))
  - Summer (DST): UTC-4 (EDT)
- ZIP code(s): 48820 (DeWitt); 48822 (Eagle); 48837 (Grand Ledge); 48906 (Lansing)
- Area code: 517
- FIPS code: 26-84400
- GNIS feature ID: 1627221
- Website: Official website

Watertown Charter Township is a charter township of Clinton County in the U.S. state of Michigan. The population was 5,563 in the 2020 census, which was a big increase from 4,836 at the 2010 census.

== Communities ==
Wacousta is a small unincorporated community and census-designated place within the township.

== Geography ==
According to the United States Census Bureau, the township has a total area of 35.72 square miles (92.51 km^{2}), of which 35.51 square miles (91.97 km^{2}) is land and 0.21 square miles (0.54 km^{2}) (0.59%) is water.

== Demographics ==
Historical population
Census	Pop.	Note	%±
1960	2,008		—
1970	3,146		56.7%
1980	3,602		14.5%
1990	3,731		3.6%
2000	4,162		11.6%
2010	4,836		16.2%
U.S. Decennial Census

As of the census of 2000, there were 4,162 people, 1,469 households, and 1,213 families residing in the township. The population density was 116.5 inhabitants per square mile (45.0/km^{2}). There were 1,502 housing units at an average density of 42.0 per square mile (16.2/km^{2}). The racial makeup of the township was 96.11% White, 0.70% African American, 0.19% Native American, 0.77% Asian, 0.12% Pacific Islander, 1.15% from other races, and 0.96% from two or more races. Hispanic or Latino of any race were 2.40% of the population.

There were 1,469 households, out of which 38.7% had children under the age of 18 living with them, 74.1% were married couples living together, 6.3% had a female householder with no husband present, and 17.4% were non-families. 14.6% of all households were made up of individuals, and 5.3% had someone living alone who was 65 years of age or older. The average household size was 2.81 and the average family size was 3.11.

In the township the population was spread out, with 27.5% under the age of 18, 6.6% from 18 to 24, 27.4% from 25 to 44, 30.4% from 45 to 64, and 8.2% who were 65 years of age or older. The median age was 39 years. For every 100 females, there were 102.5 males. For every 100 females age 18 and over, there were 96.6 males.

The median income for a household in the township was $67,034, and the median income for a family was $71,354. Males had a median income of $50,536 versus $31,875 for females. The per capita income for the township was $26,631. About 1.1% of families and 2.2% of the population were below the poverty line, including 2.4% of those under age 18 and none of those age 65 or over.
