= Portland Riverwalk =

Rail trail in Portland, Michigan, USA

Portland Riverwalk, located in the Ionia County, Michigan city of Portland, is a rail trail connected to a system of similar trails 15 miles (24 km) in total length. Used for walking, bike riding, and various sports activities, it has served as one of the city’s main focal features.

== History ==
Portland rests on both the site of the big alls under the water. Looking Glass River and the Grand River; the city itself is known as the “City of Two Rivers”.

Although the exact year of the trail’s birth is not clearly defined, its lifespan continues to grow, as there have been more additions to its length in recent years. There have also been additions to the existing trail system to provide more comfort for passersby; this includes an observation deck and gazebo, and a long string of benches, each of them dedicated to an individual who has served the city of Portland.

During a walk, one could discover possibly one or two of the city’s four historic metal truss bridges. All of them have been preserved, though only one bridge still stands in its original location and continues to serve vehicular traffic. The other three bridges have all been moved to different areas of the town and reserved for pedestrian use only.

== Location ==
Some of the important locations are:

- Trailhead on Gibbs Road 42°53′09.7″N 84°56′23.0″W
- Bridge over the Grand River 42°52′23.9″N 84°54′07.7″W

== Tourist Attraction Zone ==
The Riverwalk has one endpoint located at the Portland High School; from there, it heads east and begins to surround virtually all the city. It frequently runs parallel to either the Grand or the Looking Glass, and therefore highlights the area’s natural beauty.

Even though the trail system is in a suburban location, the Riverwalk offers a variety of scenic sites that range from neighborhood sidewalks and city pavement to quiet wooded areas and fields.

== Reviews ==
Due to its popularity with both residents and tourists, this rail trail continues to flourish and spread itself around the city and throughout.
