= Bridge Street Bridge (Portland, Michigan) =

Historic bridge in Michigan, United States

- Coordinates: 42°52′11″N 84°54′14.5″W
- Crosses: Grand River
- Locale: Portland, Michigan
- Other name: Veterans Memorial Bridge
- ID number: 344552000015B01

Characteristics
- Design: Pratt through truss
- Total length: 210 ft (64 m)
- Width: 15 ft (4.6 m)
- No. of spans: 2
- Piers in water: 1

History
- Constructed by: Groton Bridge and Manufacturing Company
- Opened: 1890
- Rebuilt: 1990
- Bridge Street Bridge
- U.S. Historic district – Contributing property
- Part of: Portland Downtown Historic District (ID05000153)
- Designated CP: May 18, 2005

Location
- Interactive map of Bridge Street Bridge

Bridge Street Bridge, also known as Veterans Memorial Bridge, is a two-span Pratt through truss bridge that crosses the Grand River in Portland, Michigan, in the United States. Completed in 1890, it is the oldest known surviving example of a truss bridge built in the state by the Groton Bridge and Manufacturing Company.

Within Portland, the bridge has historically been known as the "Upper Bridge" to distinguish it from the "Lower Bridge" crossing at Grand River Avenue, which is located approximately 400 ft (120 m) downstream. Fabricated from iron and steel, Bridge Street Bridge replaced a wooden bridge that had been built at the same site in 1837–1838.

After being damaged by ice flows in the river, Bridge Street Bridge was closed to truck traffic in 1952. It was subsequently closed to all vehicular traffic in 1978 as a result of continued deterioration. The bridge was rehabilitated in 1990 using Critical Bridge funds from the Michigan Department of Transportation and the Federal Highway Administration, marking the first time that the state had used these funds for bridge restoration instead of bridge replacement.

Today the single-lane Bridge Street Bridge is open to vehicular traffic with a weight limit of 15 short tons (14 t) and operates one-way in the eastbound direction; a pedestrian walkway runs along the north side of the bridge. Other vehicles crossing the river in Portland use the bridge at Grand River Avenue, which carries two-way traffic.

Bridge Street Bridge was designated as a Michigan Historic Civil Engineering Landmark by the American Society of Civil Engineers in 1991. The structure is included within the Portland Downtown Historic District.

== See also ==
- List of bridges documented by the Historic American Engineering Record in Michigan
