= Parshallburg Bridge =

- U.S. National Register of Historic Places
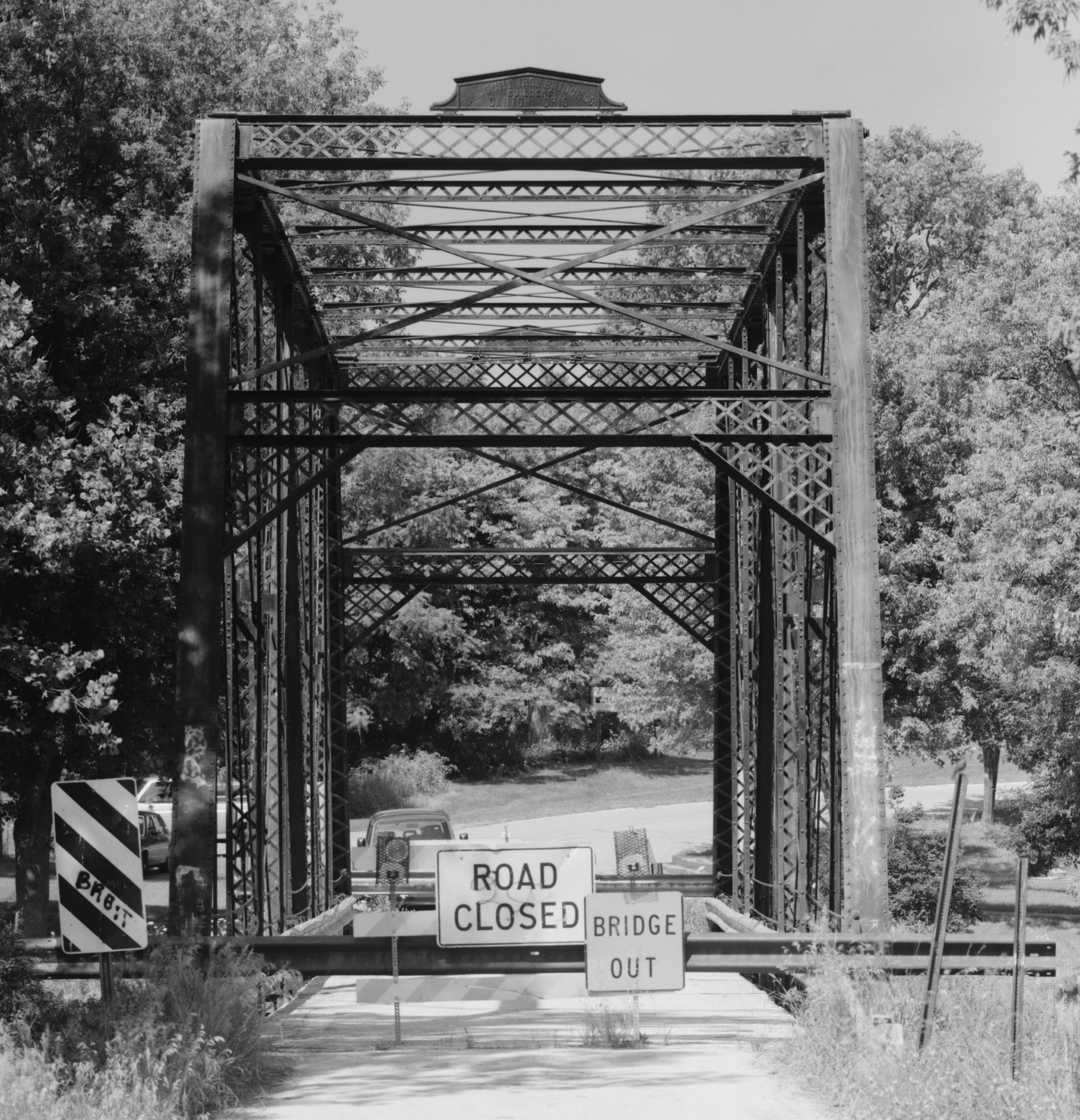
- Interactive map
- Nearest city: Oakley, Michigan
- Coordinates: 43°08′38″N 84°08′07″W
- Area: less than one acre
- Built: 1889
- Built by: Wrought Iron Bridge Company
- Architectural style: Thacher through truss
- Demolished: 1999
- NRHP reference No.: 94001168
- Added to NRHP: October 12, 1994

The Parshallburg Bridge, also known as the Ditch Road Bridge, was a bridge that originally carried Ditch Road over the Shiawassee River near Oakley, Michigan. It was listed on the National Register of Historic Places in 1994. It was the only known Thacher through truss bridge in Michigan, and one of only a few remaining in the nation. In 1999, the bridge was moved to a new location, and in 2008 was washed off its piers and destroyed.

== History ==
In 1855, Israel Parshall dammed the Shiawassee River at this location and constructed saw and grist mills located on opposite banks. A hamlet sprang up around the mills, originally called Havana but later known as Parshallville or Parshallburg. It is likely that the first bridge at this location was constructed soon after the mills, and that the original bridge was replaced at a later date, perhaps in the 1870s. An 1889 edition of the Chesaning Argus describes this second bridge as an "iron bridge put up on piles only a few years ago." However, by 1889 this bridge had grown dangerous, and the local highway commission decided to replace it. They contracted with the Wrought Iron Bridge Company of Canton, Ohio to construct a new iron bridge. New abutments were constructed in the summer of 1889, and assembly of the bridge began soon after.

The bridge remained in service until the 1980s. In 1986, it was identified as critically in need of replacement, and in 1992 it was closed to traffic. In 1999, the bridge was relocated to Chesaning, Michigan. However, the piers at the new location were too low for the surrounding area, and in late 2008, the bridge was washed away off its piers by flood and ice, and completely destroyed.

== Description ==
The Parshallburg Bridge was a single-span, Thacher metal through truss bridge, likely made of wrought and cast iron. The Thacher through truss was invented in 1883 by Edwin Thacher, who was then chief engineer of the Keystone Bridge Company of Pittsburgh. Thacher described the truss design as a "combination of the triangular [Pratt/Warren] and suspension [Bollman/Fink] systems," and was designed to eliminate stresses (and subsequent maintenance issues) due to temperature changes.

The Parshallburg Bridge was as eight-panel structure with a length of 140 feet (43 m) and a deck width of 17.8 feet (5.4 m) sitting on rubble fieldstone abutments. The bridge's end and upper chords are constructed from parallel channels riveted to cover plates above and lattice bars below. The vertical posts and struts are constructed from two riveted angles connected by lattice bars. The center ties, inclined suspenders, and the lower chords are constructed from eyebars. The top lateral bracing is made of tie rods with turnbuckles. On each end of the bridge was a cast-iron plaque with the words "WROUGHT IRON BRIDGE CO., BUILDERS, CANTON, OHIO."

== See also ==
- List of bridges documented by the Historic American Engineering Record in Michigan
