= St. Patrick High School (Portland, Michigan) =

St. Patrick Catholic School

Location
- 122 West Street; Portland, Michigan 48875; United States; 42°52′20″N 84°54′31″W

Information
- Type: Private, Coeducational
- Religious affiliation: Roman Catholic
- Established: 1951
- Principal: Randy Hodge
- Grades: PK–12
- Colors: Green & White
- Athletics conference: Central Michigan Athletic Conference
- Nickname: Shamrocks
- Accreditation: Michigan Association of Non-public Schools
- Yearbook: The Shamrock
- Website: www.portlandstpats.com

St. Patrick High School is a private Roman Catholic high school in Portland, Michigan. It is under the direction of the Roman Catholic Diocese of Grand Rapids.

St. Patrick School was established as a grade school in 1906 by the Sisters of St. Joseph, followed by the high school in 1951. As such, today's St. Patrick's offers K-12 catholic education and high athletics.

== History ==
=== 1906: First school building ===
The first school in 1906 was a two-story tall cement block, 59½ ft x 42½ ft, with a cement block basement and a Southern Pine interior. At the time, commentators observed the physical state of St. Patrick's:

“The rooms are 12½ and 13 feet in height, airy, pleasant and commodious, both upstairs and down and the school altogether has pleasant surroundings. There are plenty of radiators in each room and the heater and boiler is of such capacity that there is no doubt that the building will be properly warmed," Portland Review and Observer.

This building was sufficient for the first forty years of the school.

=== 1950s: New school erected ===
In 1945, new pastor Father Louis Flohe found St. Patrick's an overcrowded school. He purchased the rest of the property on the block and replaced the original school with a building that could accommodate more grades. Now students could remain through secondary graduation. The new building, which had the largest and best gymnasium in the entire area, opened in 1951. By the end of the 1950s, the classrooms once again were filled to capacity, and there was a waiting list of students who wanted to attend St. Pat’s. Father Flohe initiated another building campaign, to which the people of the parish again responded. The new addition opened in 1961, adding eight classrooms and a lower level cafeteria.

=== 2002: Final building phase ===
As the 20th century drew to a close, the parish recognized that the school once again needed to be enlarged. Father Charlie Hall oversaw another pledge drive, and within twelve weeks the money was raised. On St. Patrick’s Day, 2002, the groundbreaking ceremony took place. In November 2002, an 18,000-square-foot (1,700 m^{2}) addition, including two state-of-the-art computer labs, an art room, a music room, two new classrooms and a library/media center was completed.

== Early years ==
=== Students ===
The first St. Patrick School enrolled 60 students. The three teachers (and one housekeeper) were nuns who came to St. Patrick’s from Nazareth convent near Kalamazoo. It would be more than forty years before lay teachers arrived in the classrooms. There were no extracurricular activities at St. Patrick’s. The students were there to learn, and their days were filled with academics, catechism and the Palmer Method of Penmanship. The only exception was music class and a few occasions when Sr. Lucille took the students outdoors, lined them up in rows and had them perform some exercises.

=== Discipline ===
The priest and nuns were strict disciplinarians about behavior. Every morning, children did their early chores at home and walked to school for 8 a.m. Mass. Students were expected to be on their best behavior. They walked two by two in perfectly straight lines, and were not allowed to speak to each other at all. The students were “frightened like the dickens” of Father O’Rourke, pastor from 1922-34. He handed out report cards, then he would call a name, and that child would stand next to him while he reviewed their grades. He was known to spank kids whose grades were not up to par.

=== Dress code ===
The dress code was very rigid in the early 20th century. Boys wore long sleeved shirts and ties; sleeves could be rolled up while on playground, but had to be rolled back down when they re-entered the school. The girls wore long sleeved dresses and long cotton stockings under them. No skin showed other than hands and faces.

=== Graduation ===
Upon graduation from 8th grade in 1906, there was no ceremony, no diploma, no celebration. The students were expected to go out into the world to begin working. Very few students continued their education beyond that level.

== Athletics ==
The Shamrocks of St. Patrick School field teams in football, volleyball, girls basketball, boys basketball, cheerleading, softball, baseball, boys golf, boys bowling, girls bowling, cross country and track & field. These teams are part of the Michigan High School Athletic Association (MHSAA).

The girls' basketball team program has won six Class D State Championships (1994, 1995, 1996, 1999, 2000 and 2002). The program also features six runner-up finishes (1978, 1982, 1988, 2003, 2004 and 2006). The football program at St. Patrick experienced great success in the 1990s. Led by Coach Chris Schrauben, the Shamrocks won a Division 8 State Championship in 1992, as well as the Division 8 State Runner-Up honors in 1991 and 1997. The Shamrocks won a 8 man state championship in 2025.

Baseball is another sport in which the Shamrocks have experienced consistent success. Since taking Division 4 State Runner-Up trophies in 1971, 1973, 1993 and 2016, the Shamrocks have established a highly competitive program under St. Patrick alum Bryan Scheurer, making appearances in the state quarterfinals in both 2009 and 2010 and earning a semifinal berth in 2010. The Shamrocks won their first baseball state title in 2017, with a 6-2 victory over Hudson under St. Patrick alum Bryan Scheurer.
