= Conway Township, Michigan =

- Civil township
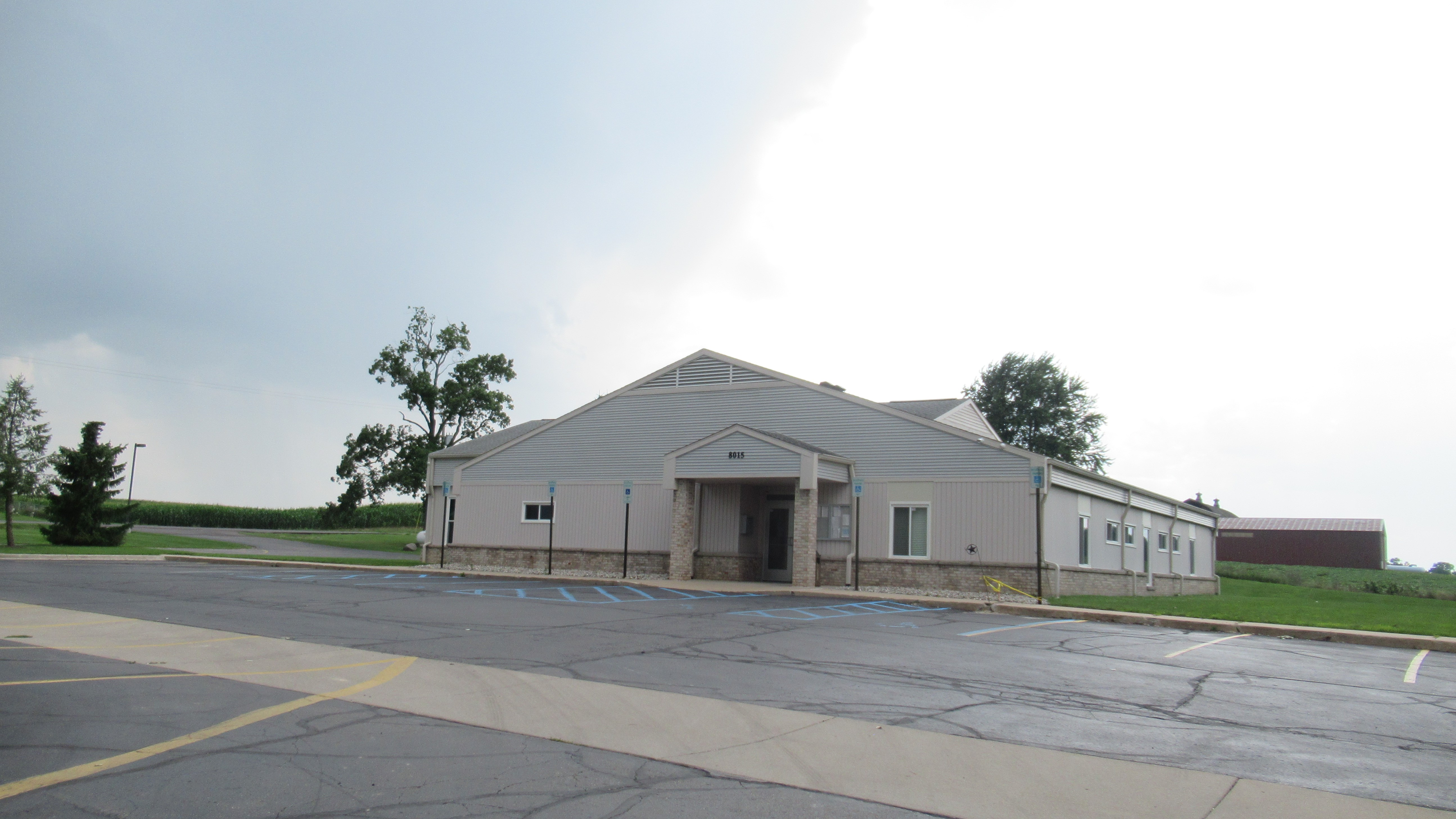
- Conway Township Hall

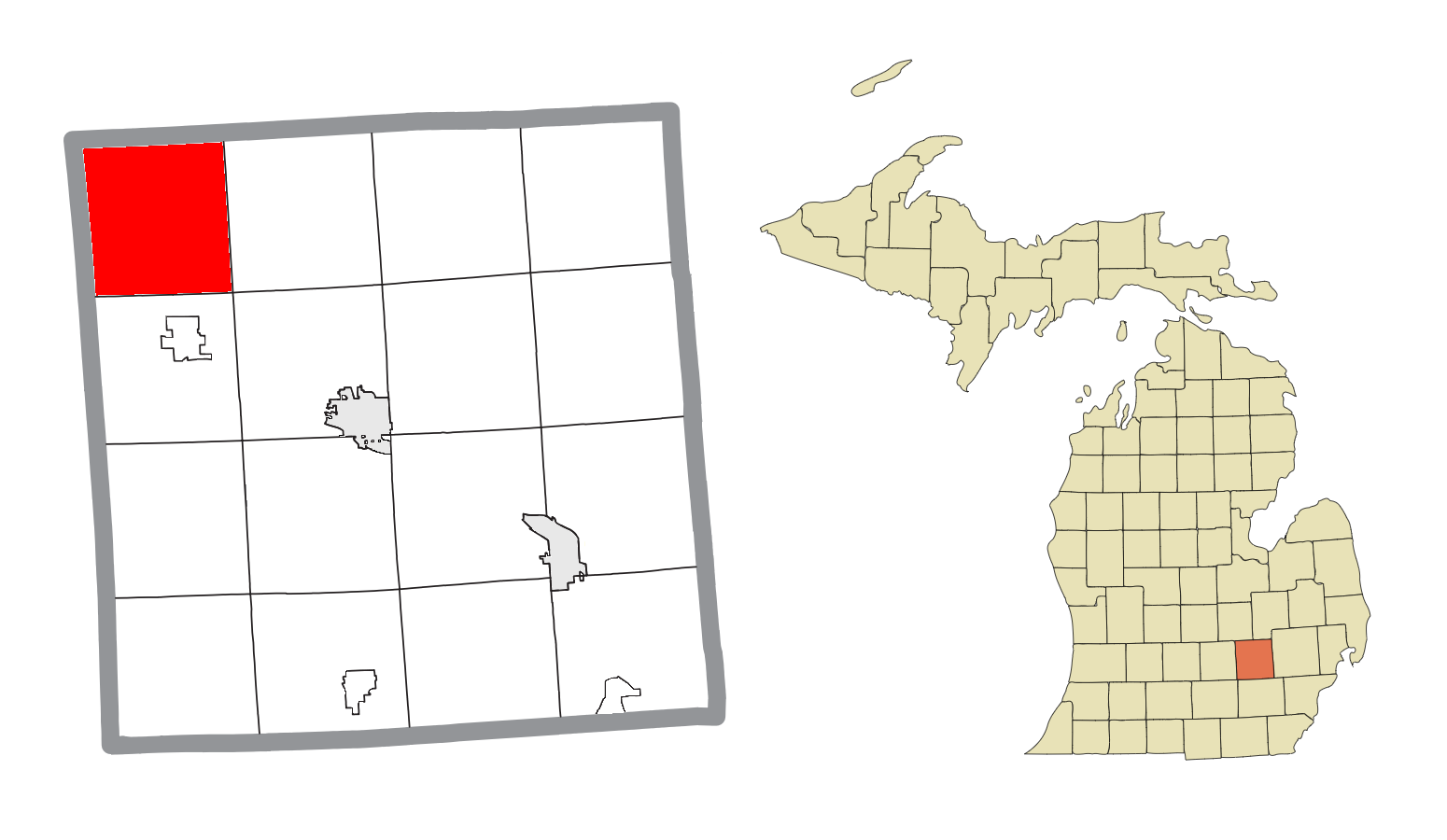
- Location within Livingston County

- Location in Michigan Location in the United States
- Coordinates: 42°43′31″N 84°06′21″W
- Country: United States
- State: Michigan
- County: Livingston
- Established: 1838

Government
  - Supervisor: Michael Rife
  - Clerk: Elizabeth Whitt

Area
  - Civil township: 37.8 sq mi (97.9 km^{2})
  - Land: 37.8 sq mi (97.8 km^{2})
  - Water: 0.039 sq mi (0.1 km^{2})
- Elevation: 899 ft (274 m)

Population (2020)
  - Civil township: 3,608
  - Density: 95.5/sq mi (36.9/km^{2})
  - Metro: 4,296,250 (Metro Detroit)
- Time zone: UTC-5 (Eastern (EST))
  - Summer (DST): UTC-4 (EDT)
- ZIP code(s): 48418 (Byron); 48836 (Fowlerville); 48872 (Perry); 48892 (Webberville)
- Area code: 517
- FIPS code: 26-17920
- GNIS feature ID: 1626130
- Website: www.conwaymi.gov

Conway Township is a civil township of Livingston County in the U.S. state of Michigan. The population was 3,608 at the 2020 census, an increase from 3,546 at the 2010 census.

== Communities ==
- Nicholson is an unincorporated community in the township on East Lovejoy Road (border road with Shiawassee County) between State and Nohel roads at 42°46′37″N 84°07′26″W.

== Geography ==
According to the United States Census Bureau, the township has a total area of 37.8 square miles (98 km^{2}), of which 37.8 square miles (98 km^{2}) is land and 0.04 square miles (0.10 km^{2}) (0.08%) is water.

== Demographics ==
=== 2010 census ===
As of the 2010 census, there were 3,546 people, 1,199 households, and 968 families residing in the township. The population density was 93.8 inhabitants per square mile (36.2/km^{2}). There were 1,264 housing units at an average density of 33.4 per square mile (12.9/km^{2}). The racial makeup of the village was 96.4% White, 0.3% African American, 0.8% Native American, 0.8% Asian, 0.1% from other races, and 1.6% from two or more races. Hispanic or Latino of any race were 1.7% of the population.

There were 968 households, of which 38.0% had children under the age of 18 living with them, 66.2% were married couples living together, 8.5% had a female householder with no husband present, 6.0% had a male householder with no wife present, and 19.3% were non-families. 15.2% of all households were made up of individuals, and 5.5% had someone living alone who was 65 years of age or older. The average household size was 2.95 and the average family size was 3.28.

The median age in the township was 37 years. 28.9% of residents were under the age of 18; 7.4% were between the ages of 18 and 24; 27.1% were from 25 to 44; 28.3% were from 45 to 64; and 8.5% were 65 years of age or older. The gender makeup of the township was 52.1% male and 47.9% female.

The median income for a household in the township was $68,077, and the median income for a family $76,638. Males had a median income of $63,125 versus $40,469 for females. The per capita income for the township was $25,751. 8.5% of families and 10.9% of the population were below the poverty line, including 13.3% of those under 18 and 6.7% of those 65 or older.

=== 2000 census ===
As of the 2000 census, there were 2,732 people, 887 households, and 748 families residing in the township. The population density was 72.3 inhabitants per square mile (27.9/km^{2}). There were 919 housing units at an average density of 24.3 per square mile (9.4/km^{2}). The racial makeup of the township was 95.97% White, 0.26% African American, 1.43% Native American, 0.15% Asian, 0.00% Pacific Islander, 0.55% from other races, and 1.65% from two or more races. 1.32% of the population were Hispanic or Latino of any race.

There were 887 households, out of which 45.7% had children under the age of 18 living with them, 75.3% were married couples living together, 6.2% had a female householder with no husband present, and 15.6% are non-families. 12.6% of all households were made up of individuals, and 4.2% had someone living alone who was 65 years of age or older. The average household size was 3.08 and the average family size was 3.38.

The median age in the township was 35 years. 31.3% of residents were under the age of 18; 7.1% were between the ages of 18 and 24; 32.7% were from 25 to 44; 21.6% were from 45 to 64; and 7.4% were 65 years of age or older. The gender makeup of the township was 51.7% male and 48.3% female.

The median income for a household in the township was $64,306, and the median income for a family was $67,206. Males had a median income of $49,392 versus $27,813 for females. The per capita income for the township was $23,796. 2.3% of families and 4.1% of the population were below the poverty line, including 6.1% of those under 18 and 6.6% of those 65 or older.
