= Shiawassee National Wildlife Refuge =

Protected area in Michigan, United States

- IUCN category IV (habitat/species management area)
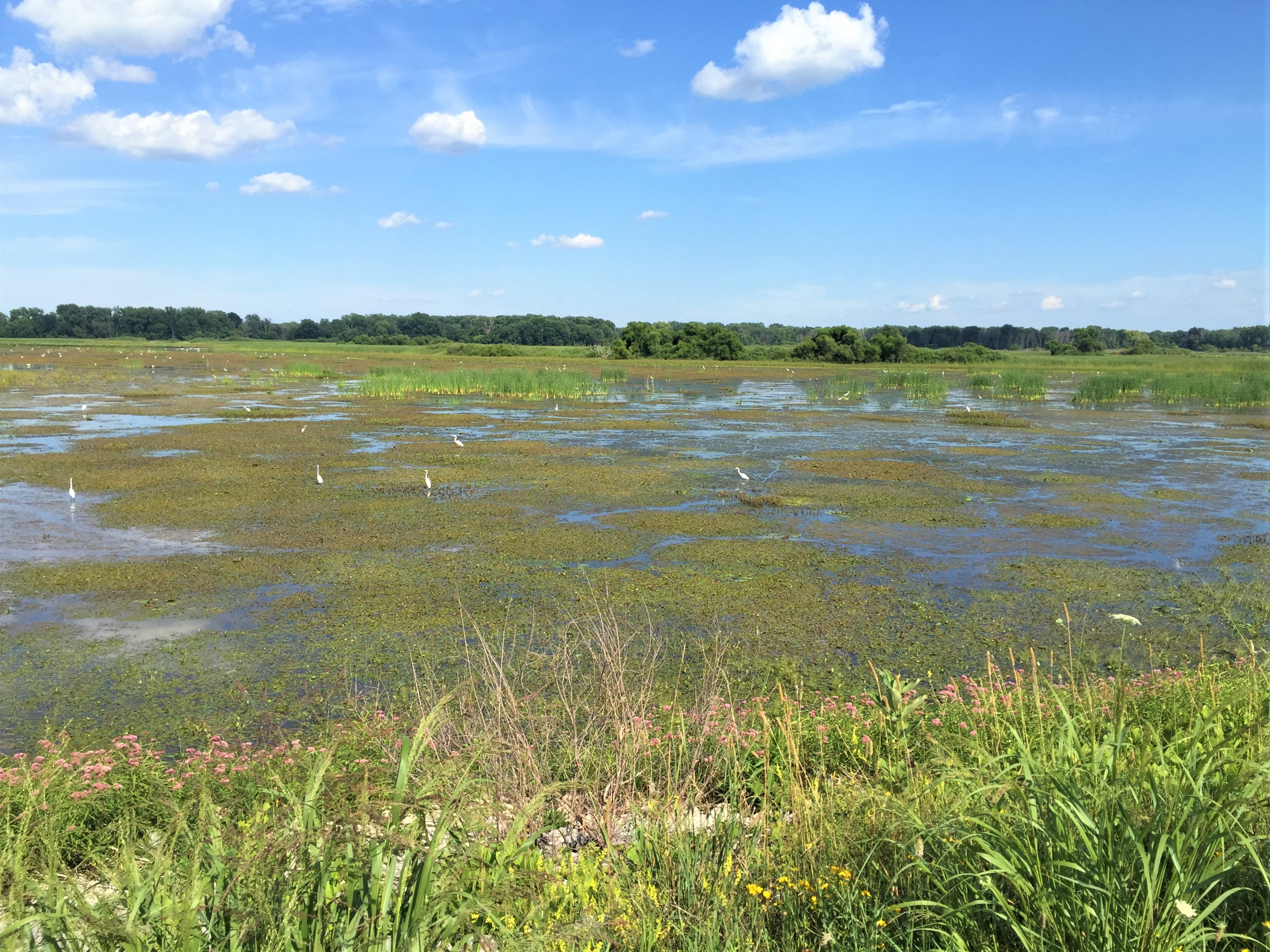
- One of several open water pools in the refuge

- Location within the United States
- Location: Saginaw County, Michigan
- Nearest city: Saginaw, Michigan
- Coordinates: 43°22′N 84°01′W
- Area: 9,870.35 acres (39.9439 km^{2})
- Established: 1953
- Governing body: U.S. Fish and Wildlife Service
- Website: Shiawassee National Wildlife Refuge

The Shiawassee National Wildlife Refuge is a 9,870.35 acres (39.9439 km^{2}) National Wildlife Refuge in Saginaw County managed by the United States Fish and Wildlife Service. It is located in the central portion of the lower peninsula of the U.S. state of Michigan, approximately 25 miles (40 km) south of the Saginaw Bay in Lake Huron and five miles (8 km) south of the city of Saginaw in the county's Spaulding and James townships. It was established in 1953 to provide habitat for migratory waterfowl.

Known locally as the Shiawassee Flats, the refuge lies in the Saginaw Bay watershed, historically one of the largest and most productive wetland ecosystems in Michigan. The Bad, Flint, and Cass Rivers flow into the Shiawassee River in the refuge. Here also the Shiawassee converges with the Tittabawassee River to form the Saginaw River.

== Wildlife and Habitat ==
Refuge habitats include riparian, floodplain/bottomland hardwood forests, and emergent marshes, as well as shallow managed wetlands and croplands.

Over 265 species of birds have been documented on the refuge, including raptors, shore and wading birds, and more than 100 songbird species. Shiawassee Refuge is designated as an Important Bird Area for its global significance to migratory waterfowl. It is also one of six focus areas designated by the Great Lakes/St. Lawrence Basin Joint Venture of the North American Waterfowl Management Plan.

During peak populations in late October, up to 25,000 Canada geese and 40,000 ducks are present. A great diversity of other wildlife associated with freshwater marshes and floodplain forests are also found here.

== History ==
In postglacial times, Lake Huron and Saginaw Bay extended much farther inland than they do now. When the water receded, it left behind a flat, sandy wetland surrounded by low hills. It served as the drainage zone for an area of lower Michigan that covers approximately ten counties. The region was a treasure-house of the wetland timber industry in the late 19th century. After the old-growth trees had almost all been removed, starting in 1903 farmers tried to ditch and tile-drain the land for arable crops. The Ferguson Bayou region of this drained land did not prove to be well-suited for this purpose, although the wildlife refuge continues to use, maintain, and rebuild many of the ditches, drains, and dikes dug during this period. The Shiawassee National Wildlife Refuge was established in 1953.

The area was an attractive hunting and gathering area for many early cultures and later Native American tribes, like the Odawa and Ojibwa. Ducks and geese flocked to this vast area of wetlands and rivers. Mammalian species including river otter, fisher, marten, elk, moose, and black bear were also found here.

The Flats received little human impact until the late 19th century, when the lumber industry expanded to this area. Coal was mined in the area from the early 20th century to the late 1930s. In 1903, farmers began converting the land for crops and, by 1950, a system of pumps, drainage tile, ditches and dikes were in place, making this an extensive agricultural area.

== Canada geese ==
Shiawassee NWR has been designated as a U.S. Important Bird Area by the American Birding Association because of the genuinely migratory James Bay flocks of Canada geese that utilize the wetland annually. These James Bay geese should be sharply distinguished from the stay-at-home geese that have learned how not to migrate.

== Refuge management ==
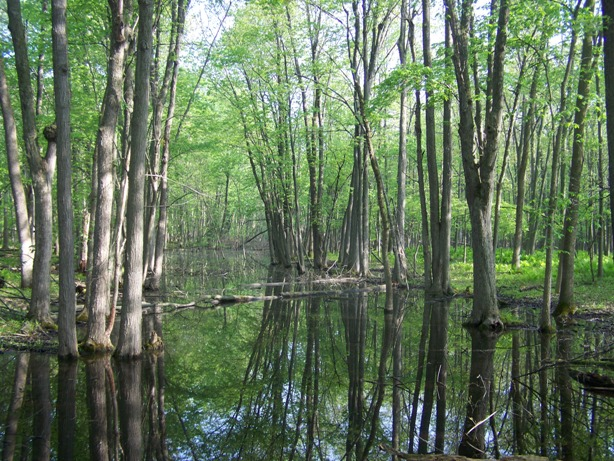
Shiawassee National Wildlife Refuge in late spring

Shiawassee Refuge is also responsible for managing a portion of the Michigan Islands National Wildlife Refuge within Lake Huron and Saginaw Bay, including Thunder Bay, Scarecrow, and the Charity Islands. The Detroit River International Wildlife Refuge is also under its management, until a permanent staff is hired. The refuge also administers the Shiawassee Management District which coordinates wetland restorations in 22 counties and oversees conservation easements in 44 counties of lower Michigan.

The refuge is authorized to expand its present boundaries by 7,500 acres (30 km^{2}) along the Tittabawassee, Shiawassee, and Cass rivers from willing sellers.
