= Bad River (Michigan) =

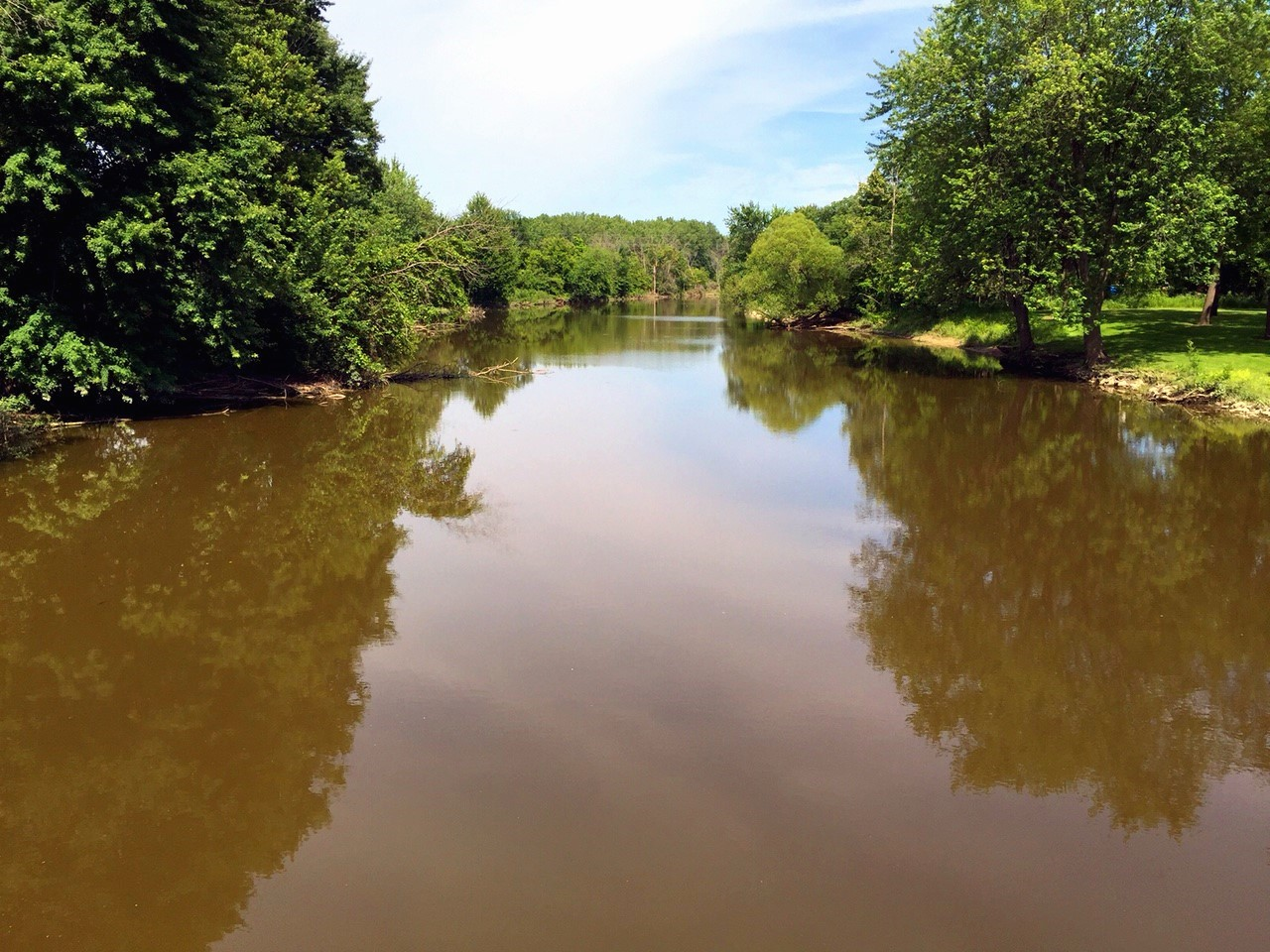
- The Bad River in St. Charles

Location
- Country: United States
- State: Michigan
- Counties: Gratiot, Saginaw

Physical characteristics
- Source
  - location: Newark Township
  - coordinates: 43.24142°N 84.63972°W
- Mouth: Shiawassee River
  - location: Shiawassee National Wildlife Refuge
  - coordinates: 43.32363°N 84.08942°W
- Length: 44.3 mi (71.3 km)
- Discharge
  - location: mouth
  - average: 263.77 cu ft/s (7.469 m^{3}/s) (estimate)

The Bad River is a 44.3-mile-long (71.3 km) river in Michigan. It rises in Newark Township near the city of Ithaca in Gratiot County and flows in a north-easterly direction into Saginaw County, and through the village of St. Charles, before emptying into the Shiawassee River within the bounds of the Shiawassee National Wildlife Refuge.

The river and its tributaries have a total combined length of 175 miles (282 km); most of it channelized. Land use within the surrounding watershed is 86.5 percent agricultural; as a result, the river system has been adversely impacted by sedimentation.

The name "Bad River" comes from the Chippewa Indians who called the river "maw-tchi-sebe" or quite literally, "bad river," because of how difficult it was for them to navigate it.

== See also ==
- List of rivers of Michigan
