= Eagle, Michigan =

- Village
- Village of Eagle
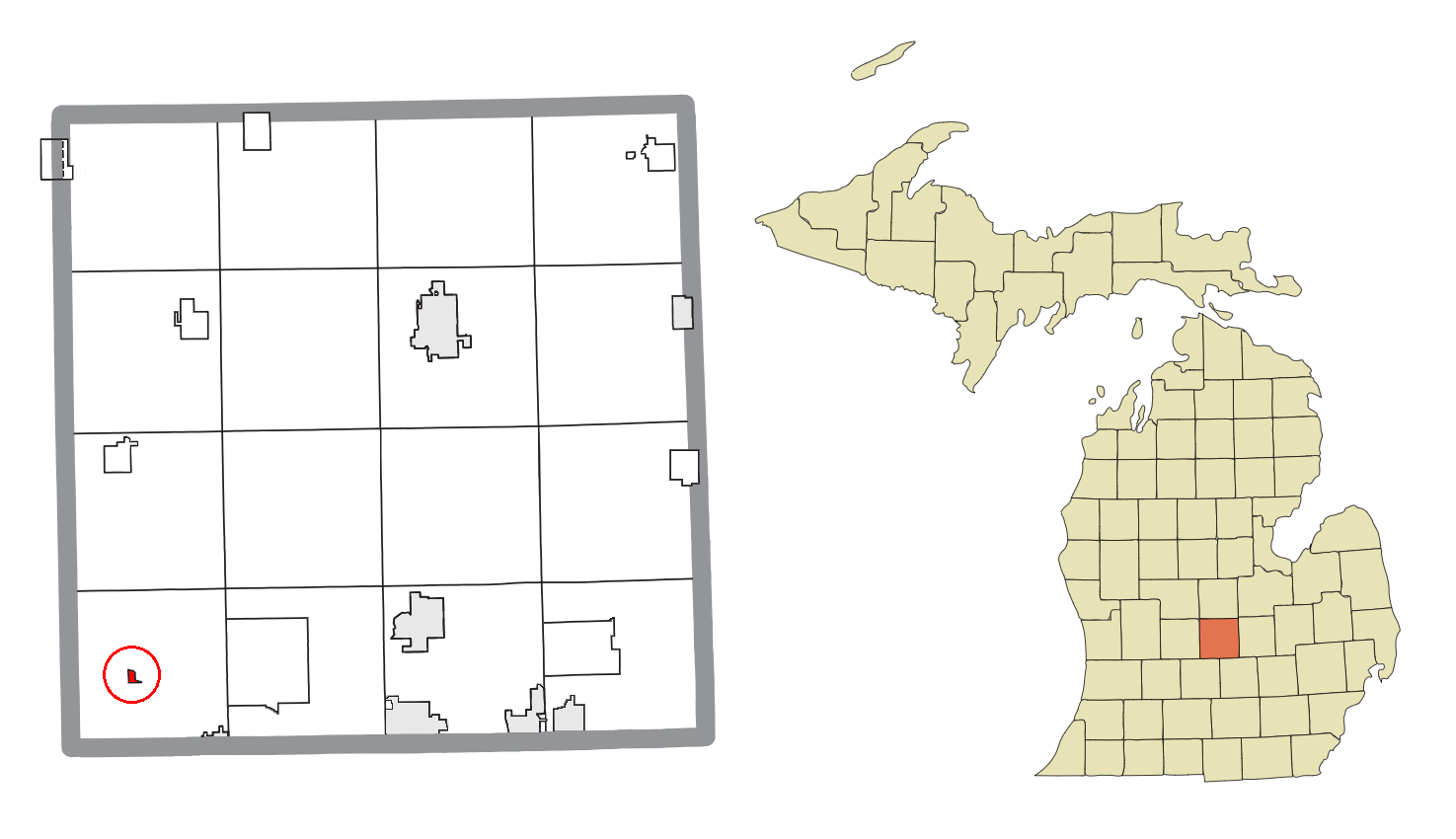
- Location within Clinton County

- Location within the state of Michigan Location within the United States
- Coordinates: 42°48′28″N 84°47′19″W
- Country: United States
- State: Michigan
- County: Clinton
- Township: Eagle
- Incorporated: 1873

Area
  - Total: 0.12 sq mi (0.32 km^{2})
  - Land: 0.12 sq mi (0.32 km^{2})
  - Water: 0 sq mi (0.00 km^{2})
- Elevation: 837 ft (255 m)

Population (2020)
  - Total: 122
  - Density: 974.4/sq mi (376.23/km^{2})
- Time zone: UTC-5 (Eastern (EST))
  - Summer (DST): UTC-4 (EDT)
- ZIP code(s): 48822
- Area code: 517
- FIPS code: 26-23560
- GNIS feature ID: 0625069

Eagle is a village in southwest Clinton County in the U.S. state of Michigan. The population was 122 at the 2020 census. The village is within Eagle Township in the southwest corner of the county. It is near Interstate 96 about 15 miles (24 km) northwest of Lansing.

Eagle is the third-least populated village in the state after Forestville (104) and Turner (121). With a land area of only 0.125 square miles (0.324 km^{2}), Eagle is the fourth-smallest overall municipality in the state by land area after Ahmeek, Copper City, and Novi Township.

== History ==
The current site of the village was formed in 1872 when George W. McCrumb donated land for a rail depot and Methodist Church, before which there had been a village of the same name a half mile west, that dated back to 1834. It was incorporated as a village in 1873.

== Geography ==
According to the United States Census Bureau, the village has a total area of 0.125 square miles (0.324 km^{2}), all land.

== Demographics ==
Historical population
Census	Pop.	Note	%±
1880	120		—
1890	141		17.5%
1900	142		0.7%
1910	133		−6.3%
1920	100		−24.8%
1930	123		23.0%
1940	147		19.5%
1950	145		−1.4%
1960	141		−2.8%
1970	175		24.1%
1980	155		−11.4%
1990	120		−22.6%
2000	130		8.3%
2010	123		−5.4%
2020	122		−0.8%
U.S. Decennial Census

=== 2010 census ===
As of the census of 2010, there were 123 people, 48 households, and 34 families residing in the village. The population density was 1,025.0 inhabitants per square mile (395.8/km^{2}). There were 50 housing units at an average density of 416.7 per square mile (160.9/km^{2}). The racial makeup of the village was 99.2% White and 0.8% from other races. Hispanic or Latino of any race were 0.8% of the population.

There were 48 households, of which 37.5% had children under the age of 18 living with them, 56.3% were married couples living together, 10.4% had a female householder with no husband present, 4.2% had a male householder with no wife present, and 29.2% were non-families. 22.9% of all households were made up of individuals, and 10.4% had someone living alone who was 65 years of age or older. The average household size was 2.56 and the average family size was 3.09.

The median age in the village was 40.8 years. 23.6% of residents were under the age of 18; 8.9% were between the ages of 18 and 24; 30.1% were from 25 to 44; 23.6% were from 45 to 64; and 13.8% were 65 years of age or older. The gender makeup of the village was 47.2% male and 52.8% female.

=== 2000 census ===
As of the census of 2000, there were 130 people, 46 households, and 35 families residing in the village. The population density was 1,061.2 inhabitants per square mile (409.7/km^{2}). There were 47 housing units at an average density of 383.7 per square mile (148.1/km^{2}). The racial makeup of the village was 99.23% White, 0.77% from other races. Hispanic or Latino of any race were 3.85% of the population.

There were 46 households, out of which 37.0% had children under the age of 18 living with them, 71.7% were married couples living together, and 23.9% were non-families. 15.2% of all households were made up of individuals, and 8.7% had someone living alone who was 65 years of age or older. The average household size was 2.83 and the average family size was 3.26.

In the village, the population was spread out, with 29.2% under the age of 18, 3.1% from 18 to 24, 33.8% from 25 to 44, 22.3% from 45 to 64, and 11.5% who were 65 years of age or older. The median age was 38 years. For every 100 females, there were 109.7 males. For every 100 females age 18 and over, there were 114.0 males.

The median income for a household in the village was $41,667, and the median income for a family was $45,625. Males had a median income of $41,667 versus $28,750 for females. The per capita income for the village was $19,332. There were no families and 2.0% of the population living below the poverty line, including no under eighteens and none of those over 64.

== See also ==
- Michigan Crossroads Council
