= Looking Glass River =

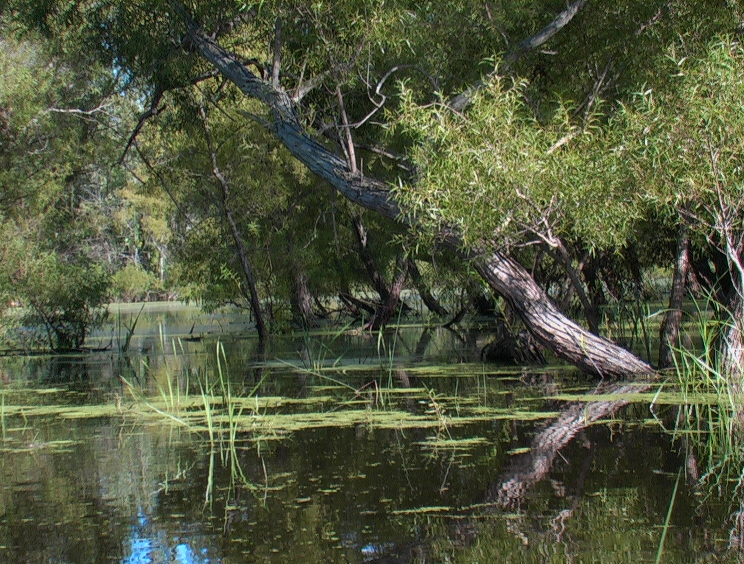
- The river in A Looking Glass Sanctuary, a nature preserve in Clinton County

Physical characteristics
- Source
  - location: Conway Township, Livingston County, Michigan, US
  - coordinates: 42.754581°N 84.12773°W
- Mouth
  - location: Portland, Michigan, US
  - coordinates: 42.871252°N 84.90221°W
- Length: 71 mi (114 km)
- Discharge
  - location: mouth
  - average: 240.2 cu ft/s (6.80 m^{3}/s) (estimate)

Basin features
- Progression: Grand River → Lake Michigan

The Looking Glass River in the U.S. state of Michigan is a river flowing through the central region of the Lower Peninsula. It is a tributary of the Grand River. The Looking Glass River is about 71 miles (114 km) long, has no dams, and borders many wetlands and woodlots.

== Name ==
Nineteenth-century sources have transcribed the alternate name of Wabenasebee for the river. That name may refer to the large Chippewa settlement of Wabwahnahseepee that had existed, just north of modern DeWitt, when European settlers first arrived.

== Course ==
It rises in Conway Township in northeast Livingston County and flows north into Shiawassee County, passing between Morrice and Bancroft as it turns westward and passes just south of Laingsburg on the western edge of Shiawassee. It then runs through the southern portion of Clinton County, including DeWitt. It flows into the Grand River in Portland in southeast Ionia County.

The stream starts as a slow soft-bottom waterway. On the 25 miles (40 km) between the Livingston County line and Laingsburg the river averages 10 to 18 feet (3.0 to 5.5 m) wide. There is more activity in the lower stretch below DeWitt, where there is good fishing and canoeing.

== Settlement history ==
The earliest known settlers of the Looking Glass Watershed were the Sauk people who were eventually replaced by people of the Chippewa and Ottawa tribes. The area was highly regarded for its abundance of game and fish. White settlers came to the area following trails up the Flint and Shiawassee rivers inland from Detroit and Port Huron.

== Conservation ==
In Clinton County, the river flows through the A Looking Glass Sanctuary, a 13-acre (5.3 ha) nature preserve owned by the Michigan Nature Association.
