= Shiawassee River =

River in Michigan, United States

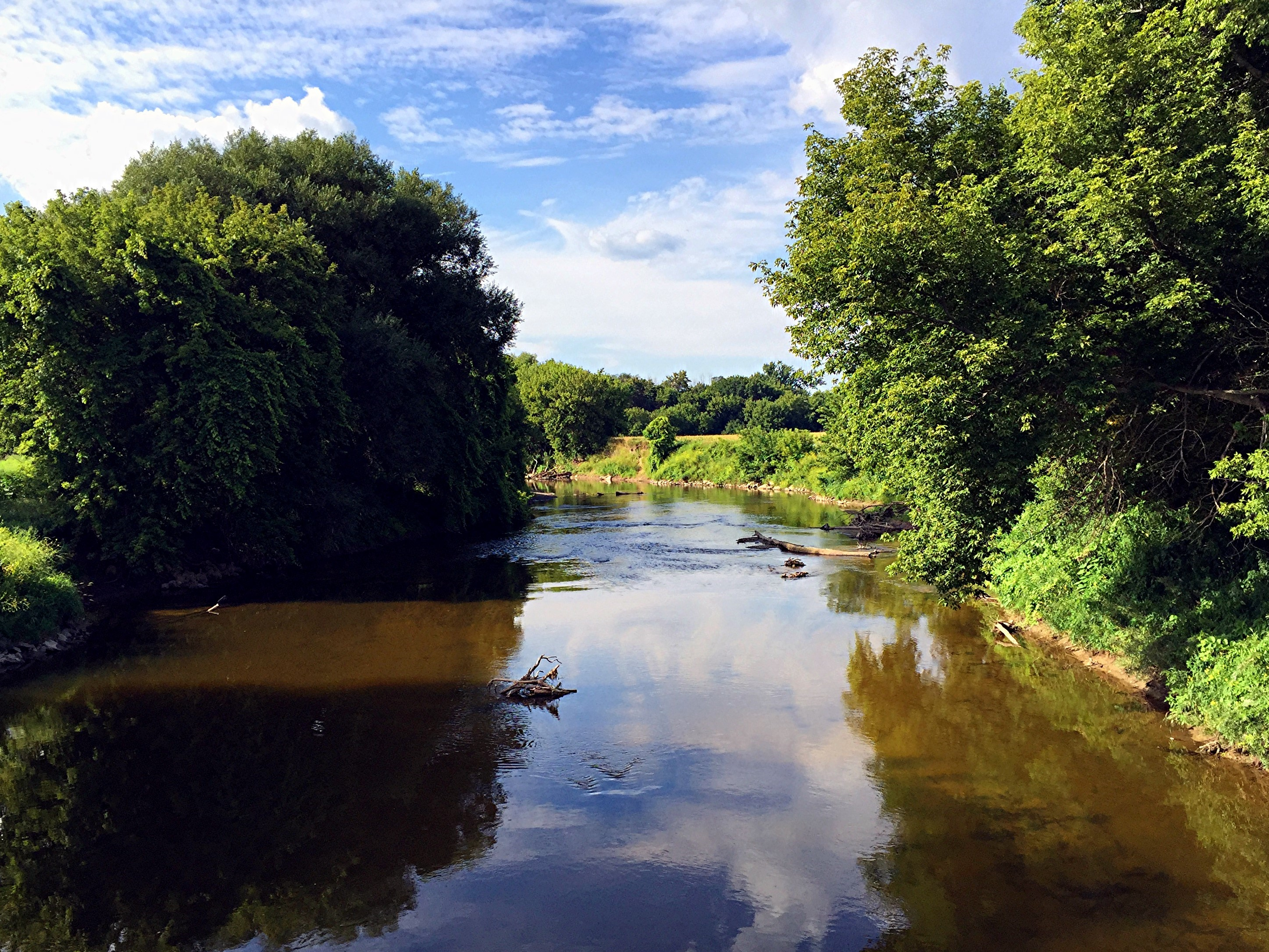

Physical characteristics
- Source
  - location: Springfield Township, Oakland County, Michigan
  - coordinates: 42.73086°N 83.51077°W
- Mouth
  - location: Saginaw River, Michigan
  - coordinates: 43.38697°N 83.96608°W
- Length: 110 mi (180 km)
- Basin size: 1,201 mi^{2} (3,110 km^{2})
- Discharge
  - location: mouth
  - average: 2,639.68 cu ft/s (74.747 m^{3}/s) (estimate)

The Shiawassee River (/ˌʃaɪəˈwɒsi/ SHY-ə-WOSS-ee) in the U.S. state of Michigan drains an area of 1,201 square miles (3,110 km^{2}) within Oakland, Genesee, Livingston, Shiawassee, Midland and Saginaw counties. It flows in a generally northerly direction for approximately 110 miles (180 km) from its source to its confluence with the Tittabawassee River creating the Saginaw River, which drains into Saginaw Bay of Lake Huron.

The name is derived from the Chippewa "Gwayak-waasizo" meaning "the straight ahead & shining or sparkling river."

== Description ==
The Shiawassee watershed is located south and west of Saginaw Bay in Central Michigan. Its basin is shaped like an hourglass, approximately 65 miles (105 km) long and 30 miles (48 km) wide at each end, and narrows to 5 miles (8.0 km) wide near Corunna. The river rises in Oakland County in Springfield Township at Shiawassee Lake. It is predominantly a rural watershed that is dominated by agriculture uses in its lower region and agricultural and rural/small community residential uses upstream.

Near its confluence with the Tittabawassee River, within the bounds of the Shiawassee National Wildlife Refuge, the Shiawassee receives the waters of the Bad, Flint, and Cass rivers. Smaller tributaries of the river include: Denton/North Ore Creek, South Branch Shiawassee, Jones Porter Drain, Beaver Creek, Birch Run Creek, and Swan Creek. It flows through Holly, Fenton, Linden, Byron, Corunna, Owosso, and Chesaning.

Supporting approximately 1,201 square miles (3,110 km^{2}) of watershed environment, there are over 61 species of fish, including darters, minnows, channel catfish, pugnose shiner, greater redhorse, stonecat, river chub and striped shiner. There are also 14 species of freshwater mussel found in the watershed. The swamps and fens adjacent to the river's headwaters support several rare species of plants and animals and play a major role in the travels of migratory waterfowl and shorebirds.

== Geology ==
The Upper Shiawassee River is bordered by alternating east–west trending moraines, glacial till, and outwash plains. The moraines and outwash plains contain sand and gravel deposits that are more permeable than the fine-grained glacial till and lake clays found in the downstream. The upper half of the watershed has variable (high) relief and is generally well drained with numerous shallow aquifers that contribute groundwater flow to the headwaters of the Shiawassee River.

The Lower Shiawassee is bordered by a low-relief till plain overlain by relatively impermeable and are poorly drained fine-grained glacial lake clays and relict beach deposits that were deposited over a period of several thousand years when glacial Lake Saginaw covered much of the area, after the most recent retreat of the ice at the end of the Wisconsin glaciation. The present-day riverbed has eroded into the till plain surface and is now deeply incised, as are the tributary streams and agricultural drains flowing into it.

== Conservation ==
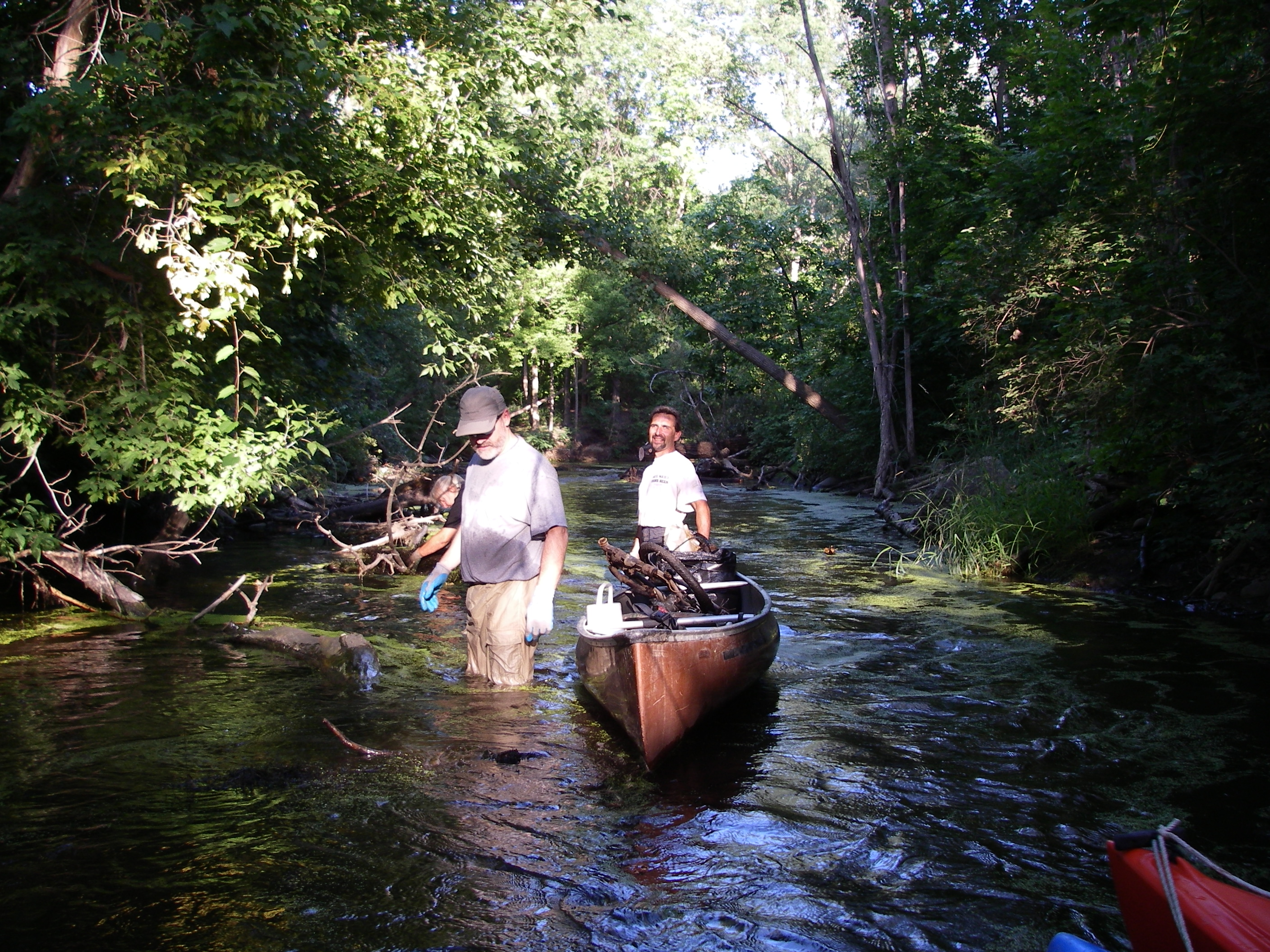
Shiawassee River cleanup near Bush Park in Fenton, Michigan

HeadWaters Trails Inc. in Holly (Oakland County) promotes the navigability of the river through Fenton towards Lake Ponemah, all the way to Byron, Michigan and the protection of the habitat along the river and in the river to make that experience special. They have cleaned the river as far down as Byron each year. Volunteer crews remove dead falls, and woody debris, which are anchored to the banks for shore protection and fish habitat; and remove garbage to allow canoe/kayak paddling. This will allow paddlers to start in Holly, do a small portage at Fenton dam, and continue on to Lake Ponemah. The more adventuresome can go as far as the dam in Byron. Every year Headwaters Trails hosts an annual Shiawassee River Paddle along the river between Holly and Fenton in June, known as the "Adventure Paddle". In the October, it hosts "Canoeing in Color", a time to see migrating birds and the changing of the leaves to brilliant fall colors. These paddles are to raise awareness of the river to the community and help support the efforts of Headwaters Trails to continue making improvements in the form of new places to put in the river as well as signage and fund the purchase of things like steel cables to anchor logs to the banks of the river. They work closely with the communities along the river to promote and conserve that trail as a place where paddle craft can go and where fish habitat is preserved. The number of kingfishers, Blue Herons and other fishing birds is a tribute to that effort.

Other groups that help maintain and conserve the Shiawassee River include local advocates, the Friends of the Shiawassee River, and many others. The Friends of the Shiawassee River is a special interest group and non-profit organization founded in 1996. Their mission is to Care, to maintain and improve the water quality and habitats of the Shiawassee River watershed; Share, to enhance the community’s appreciation and knowledge of the river, especially among youth; and Enjoy, to increase recreational access and responsible use of the Shiawassee River. The Friends also hold an annual river clean-up and conduct invasive species removal workdays. They mainly concern themselves with the part of the river below Walnut Hills campground, on down to Owosso.

The Keepers of the Shiawassee are a new group that has grown out of the efforts started by Headwaters Trails, Inc. in Holly that created a paddling trail along the river from Holly to Fenton. The Keepers organize and link volunteers in Genesee County to continue the creation and evolution of a navigable river throughout Michigan. They promote paddling events to create public awareness, such as moonlight and sunrise paddles. These events contribute to the economic well being of the communities served by the Shiawassee River.

Headwaters Trails, a 501 (c)(3)non-profit, has received grants to put in a launch in Water Works Park in Holly; put a bridge over the sluice in Water Works Park to make the launch more accessible from the parking lot; put up kiosks and signs that describe historic and natural features of the river, put mile markers along the river and emergency takeout markers; marked the bridges with their names and purchased land for a takeout at Fish Lake Road. They are still attempting to raise money to build that takeout, which will be expensive due to the soil conditions, current lack of parking and the fact that it will need to be handicap accessible. Headwaters Trails Inc. sought and received the designation of Shiawassee River Heritage Water Trail, for the river. This effort was supported by Oakland County Parks, who designed a logo for the trail and helped with creating the art work that describes the historic and natural features of the river. Headwaters Trails hired renowned artist Gayle Vandercook to create the signs on the kiosks. Kristen Wiltfang of Oakland County Parks helped with the colorful graphics of the Saginaw Bay Watershed and descriptions.

Several land conservation groups, including the North Oakland Headwaters Land Conservancy (NOHLC), the Michigan Nature Association (MNA) and The Nature Conservancy (TNC) have either purchased land or have easements that seek to protect the land from development. This lack of development along the banks of the upper Shiawassee make it one of the least flashy, with regard to floods, in the lower part of the state. It means that as one paddles down the river, mostly you see trees and fields as opposed to houses and lawns and the river does not go into flood stage because a rainstorm came through, making paddling safer than on flashy rivers. It means that habitat for the endangered Blanding's turtle and the fringed gentian, is preserved. More still needs to be done. These efforts are ongoing. NOHLC is currently seeking grants and volunteers to increase the protection of critical breeding habitat for the Blanding's turtle and has been waging war against invasive plants like the Autumn olive tree, the Buckthorn tree, the Multiflora Rose bush, Japanese barberry, Asian Bittersweet, Phragmites, Purple Loosetrife, Garlic Mustard, Swallow-wort and others. These invasives crowd out native plants that are needed by many native species of animals for survival. The decrease in Warblers and other beautiful and colorful native birds, for instance can in many cases be tied to habitat loss exacerbated by the introduction of invasive plants. In many cases, these invasive plants were planted because they have fierce thorns that make impenetrable natural fences or because the flowers or berries are pretty. Each has its own destructive effect.

== Shiawassee River Heritage Water Trail ==
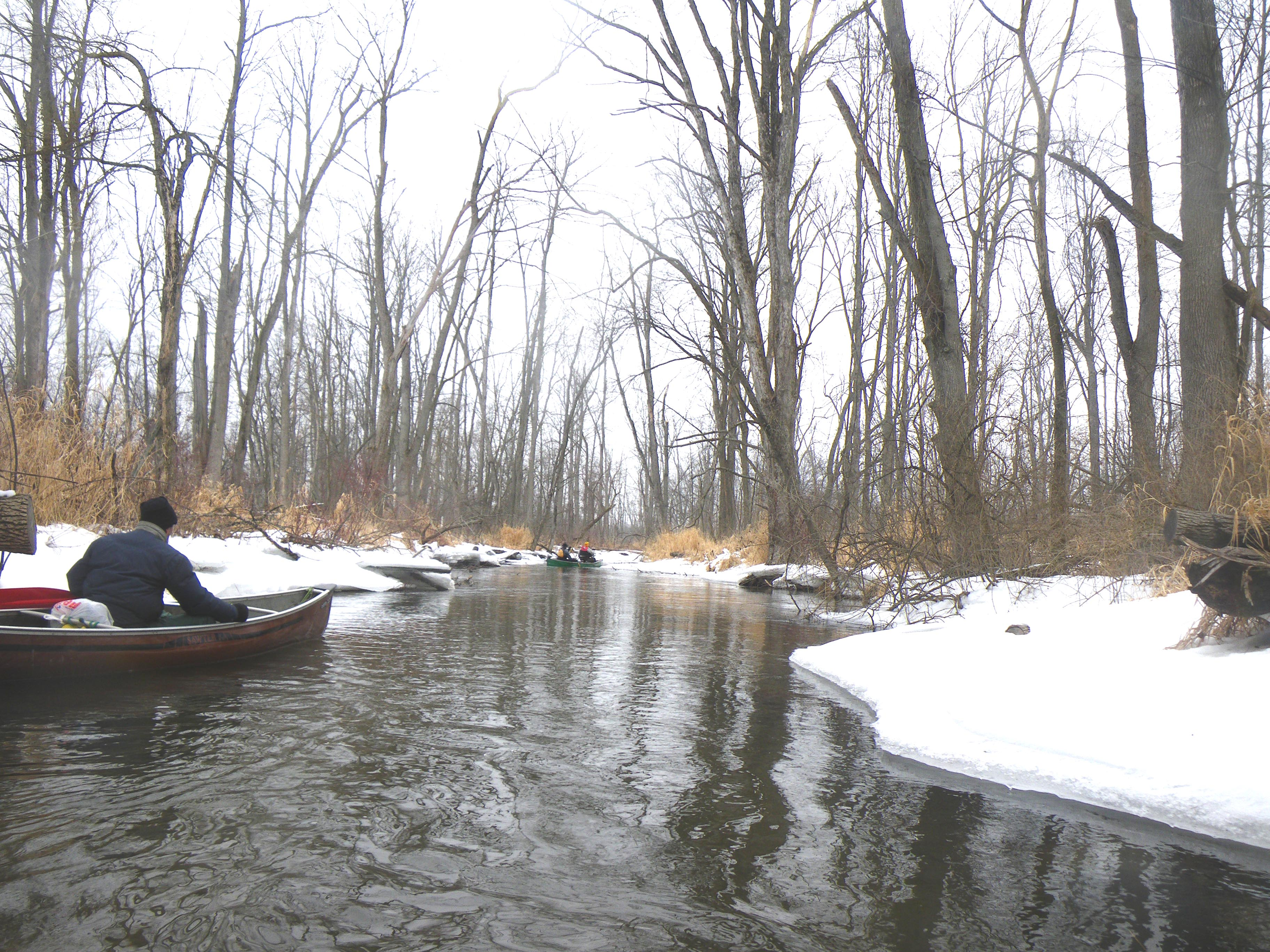
Winter canoeing and kayaking upon the Shiawassee River

The Shiawassee River Heritage Water Trail, complete with mileage markers and kiosks, is open for kayakers and canoeists.

Water Works Park at 690 Broad Street in Holly, Michigan (42°47.172′N 83°37.565′W, GPS data: 17T E 285205 N 4740417) is the launch site for the beginning of the trail. Strom Park (42°47.172′N 83°37.565′W) in Fenton is the take-out point after 7 miles (11 km) of paddling. Although this is the official length of the Shiawassee River Heritage Water Trail as it was originally conceived, Headwaters Trails and the communities along the river (Linden, Argentine Township, Holly and Fenton) have extended the trail and the ability to paddle the river all the way to Byron and are working to create new canoe launches and parks along the river.

== See also ==
- Parshallburg Bridge
