= Portland, Michigan =

- City
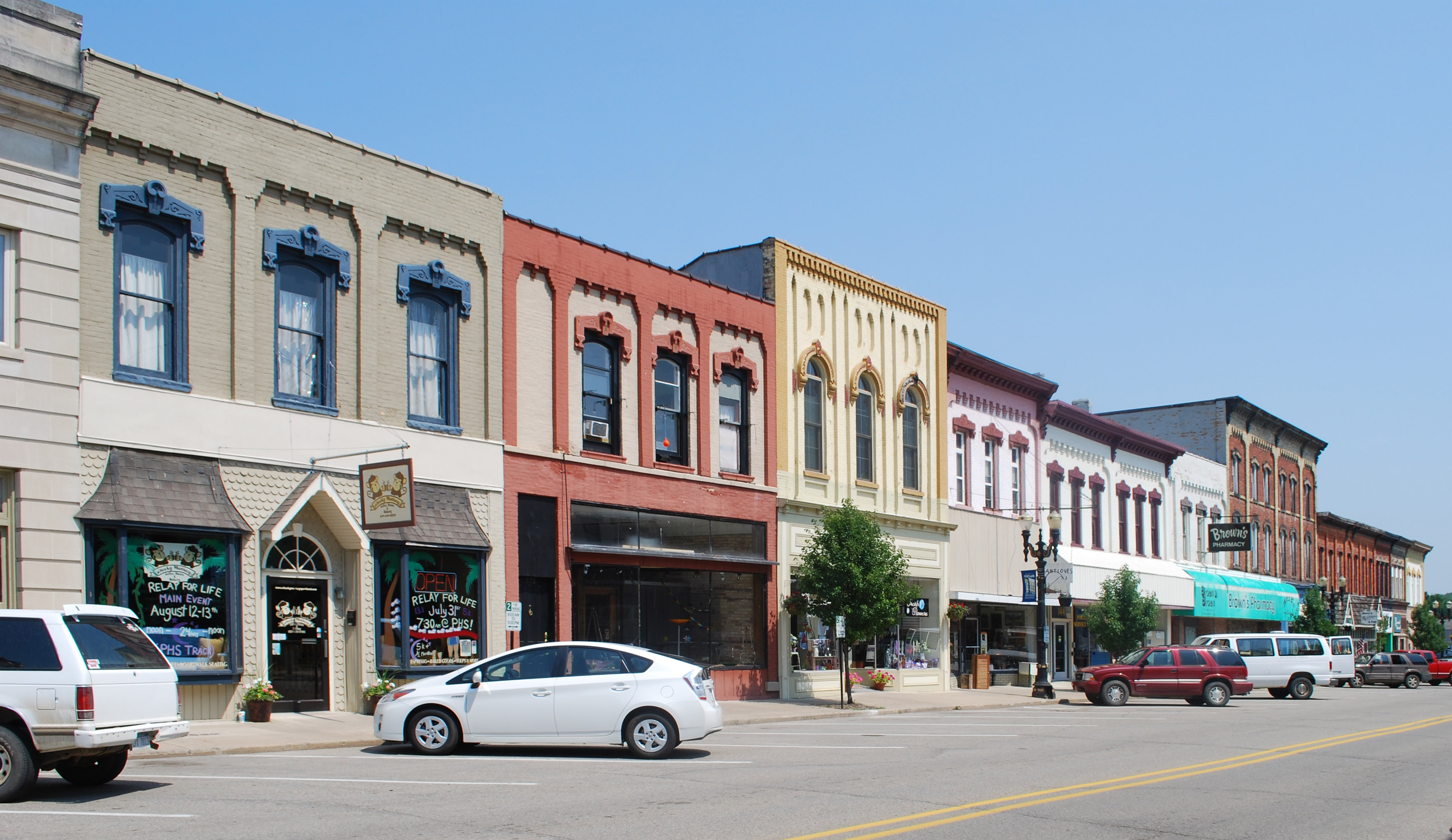
- Kent Street, Portland, Michigan in 2011
- Nickname: City of Two Rivers
- Location of Portland, Michigan
- Coordinates: 42°52′11″N 84°53′57″W
- Country: United States
- State: Michigan
- County: Ionia

Area
  - Total: 2.77 sq mi (7.18 km^{2})
  - Land: 2.63 sq mi (6.81 km^{2})
  - Water: 0.14 sq mi (0.37 km^{2})
- Elevation: 715 ft (218 m)

Population (2020)
  - Total: 3,796
  - Density: 1,443.7/sq mi (557.41/km^{2})
- Time zone: UTC-5 (Eastern (EST))
  - Summer (DST): UTC-4 (EDT)
- ZIP code: 48875
- Area code: 517
- FIPS code: 26-65860
- GNIS feature ID: 1626934
- Website: www.portland-michigan.org

Portland is a city in Ionia County of the U.S. state of Michigan. The population was 3,796 at the 2020 Census. The city is situated in the south central portion of Portland Township and is known as the "City of Two Rivers" since it is the confluence of the Grand River and the Looking Glass River. Portland is home to Portland Public Schools and Portland Saint Patrick Catholic School.

== History ==
According to government records, the first land that was owned in what is now known as Portland was owned by Elisha Newman in 1833. Ionia County histories say that Philo Bogue built a trading post on the Grand River later that year, the Bogue Flats Recreation Area now being named for him. The first post office arrived in 1837. Portland has been home to several Native American tribes, and was the dwelling-place of John Okemos in the 1850s.

The first train arrived in Portland in 1869, the last train left in 1984 when the tracks were removed. The railroad bridge built in 1881 remains, having replaced an earlier wooden bridge built in 1869. The city used to get 6 passenger trains per day in 1881, three in each direction. Portland's growth in population led to becoming a Village in 1869 and a City in 1969. The opera house opened in 1880, and the Carnegie library in 1905.

The newspaper of record is the Portland Beacon.

== Geography ==
According to the United States Census Bureau, the city has a total area of 2.78 square miles (7.20 km^{2}), of which 2.64 square miles (6.84 km^{2}) is land and 0.14 square miles (0.36 km^{2}) is water.

== Demographics ==
Historical population
Census	Pop.	Note	%±
1860	440		—
1870	1,060		140.9%
1880	1,670		57.5%
1890	1,678		0.5%
1900	1,874		11.7%
1910	1,832		−2.2%
1920	1,899		3.7%
1930	1,902		0.2%
1940	2,247		18.1%
1950	2,807		24.9%
1960	3,330		18.6%
1970	3,817		14.6%
1980	3,963		3.8%
1990	3,889		−1.9%
2000	3,789		−2.6%
2010	3,883		2.5%
2020	3,796		−2.2%
U.S. Decennial Census

=== 2020 census ===
As of the 2020 census, Portland had a population of 3,796. The median age was 37.0 years. 24.1% of residents were under the age of 18 and 17.6% of residents were 65 years of age or older. For every 100 females there were 94.2 males, and for every 100 females age 18 and over there were 91.6 males age 18 and over.

97.8% of residents lived in urban areas, while 2.2% lived in rural areas.

There were 1,623 households in Portland, of which 29.4% had children under the age of 18 living in them. Of all households, 46.3% were married-couple households, 18.4% were households with a male householder and no spouse or partner present, and 27.5% were households with a female householder and no spouse or partner present. About 30.5% of all households were made up of individuals and 12.4% had someone living alone who was 65 years of age or older.

There were 1,697 housing units, of which 4.4% were vacant. The homeowner vacancy rate was 1.0% and the rental vacancy rate was 3.1%.

Racial composition as of the 2020 census
Race	Number	Percent
White	3,537	93.2%
Black or African American	21	0.6%
American Indian and Alaska Native	16	0.4%
Asian	18	0.5%
Native Hawaiian and Other Pacific Islander	0	0.0%
Some other race	31	0.8%
Two or more races	173	4.6%
Hispanic or Latino (of any race)	122	3.2%

=== 2010 census ===
As of the census of 2010, there were 3,883 people, 1,640 households, and 1,039 families residing in the city. The population density was 1,470.8 inhabitants per square mile (567.9/km^{2}). There were 1,797 housing units at an average density of 680.7 per square mile (262.8/km^{2}). The racial makeup of the city was 96.7% White, 0.7% African American, 0.4% Native American, 0.2% Asian, 0.6% from other races, and 1.4% from two or more races. Hispanic or Latino of any race were 3.1% of the population.

There were 1,640 households, of which 33.2% had children under the age of 18 living with them, 46.1% were married couples living together, 12.1% had a female householder with no husband present, 5.2% had a male householder with no wife present, and 36.6% were non-families. 31.7% of all households were made up of individuals, and 11.9% had someone living alone who was 65 years of age or older. The average household size was 2.37 and the average family size was 2.98.

The median age in the city was 35.6 years. 25.4% of residents were under the age of 18; 9% were between the ages of 18 and 24; 27.8% were from 25 to 44; 25% were from 45 to 64; and 13% were 65 years of age or older. The gender makeup of the city was 49% male and 51% female.

=== 2000 census ===
As of the census of 2000, there were 3,789 people, 1,507 households, and 1,054 families residing in the city. The population density was 1,577.7 inhabitants per square mile (609.2/km^{2}). There were 1,574 housing units at an average density of 655.4 per square mile (253.1/km^{2}). The racial makeup of the city was 97.68% White, 0.50% African American, 0.24% Native American, 0.18% Asian, 0.34% from other races, and 1.06% from two or more races. Hispanic or Latino of any race were 1.32% of the population.

There were 1,507 households, out of which 36.2% had children under the age of 18 living with them, 54.7% were married couples living together, 11.9% had a female householder with no husband present, and 30% were non-families. 26.9% of all households were made up of individuals, and 12.6% had someone living alone who was 65 years of age or older. The average household size was 2.51 and the average family size was 3.05.

In the city, the population was spread out, with 28.8% under the age of 18, 7.5% from 18 to 24, 30.5% from 25 to 44, 20.5% from 45 to 64, and 12.7% who were 65 years of age or older. The median age was 34 years. For every 100 females, there were 89.3 males. For every 100 females age 18 and over, there were 87.2 males.

The median income for a household in the city was $45,656, and the median income for a family was $57,875. Males had a median income of $39,344 versus $30,348 for females. The per capita income for the city was $20,028. About 5.7% of families and 6.6% of the population were below the poverty line, including 9.1% of those under age 18 and 5.4% of those age 65 or over.

== Government ==
Portland is a council-manager government, in which the city council appoints one of its members as mayor and another as mayor pro tem — a city council member with extra ceremonial duties who chairs council meetings in the mayor's absence. The city council consists of 5 at-large council members who are elected in non-partisan elections. The registered voters of the City of Portland elect all members for either a 4-year term or a 2-year term. The elections are held in November of the odd year. The city council appoints the city manager, the city's chief administrative officer. The current mayor of Portland is James E. Barnes, who has been the acting Mayor since 2003. The city levies an income tax of 1 percent on residents and 0.5 percent on nonresidents.

== Notable people ==
- Martia L. Davis Berry (1844–1894), political reformer
- Clarence Budington Kelland (1881–1964), writer
- Kristen McDonald Rivet (born 1970), U.S. representative for Michigan
