= List of Michigan State Historic Sites in Clinton County =

Location of Clinton County in Michigan

The following is a list of Michigan State Historic Sites in Clinton County, Michigan. Sites marked with a dagger (†) are also listed on the National Register of Historic Places in Clinton County, Michigan.

== Current listings ==
| Name | Image | Location | City | Listing date |
|---|---|---|---|---|
| Banner Grange No. 1240 Hall | | Banner Road west of DeWitt Road | Greenbush Township | August 23, 1990 |
| Bath Community Hall | | 13639 Main Street | Bath | June 15, 1979 |
| Bath School Disaster Informational Site | | Main Street between High Street and Clark Road | Bath | September 19, 1991 |
| John H. Clements Homestead (Demolished) | | 2480 East Clark Road | DeWitt Township | September 8, 1982 |
| Coleman's Hotel | | Southeast corner of US-127 and French Road | Greenbush Township | November 21, 1975 |
| DeWitt Old Methodist Episcopal Church | | 115 North Bridge Street | DeWitt | March 28, 1985 |
| Roswell C. Dexter House | | 200 South Church Street | St. Johns | November 1, 1988 |
| East Ward School-demolished† | | 106 North Traver Street | St. Johns | February 27, 1980 |
| First Congregational Church of Ovid† | | 222 Main Street | Ovid | April 23, 1971 |
| Greenbush United Methodist Church | | Northwest corner of Scott Road and Marshall Road | Greenbush Township | January 22, 1987 |
| Gunnisonville Historic District | | Southeast and northeast corners of East Clark Road and Wood Road | DeWitt Township | May 11, 1976 |
| Indian History in Central Michigan | | | DeWitt Township | February 12, 1959 |
| Maple Rapids Methodist Episcopal Church | | 330 South Maple Avenue | Maple Rapids | June 18, 1998 |
| Matthews Site | | 7000-7502 N Lowell Rd (end of Lowell Road, 2 miles east of Maple Rapids) | Essex Township | September 17, 1974 |
| Michigan's Capital Commemorative Designation | | Roadside Park, I-96, west of Lansing | Watertown Township | April 27, 1965 |
| John W. Paine House | | 106 Maple Street | St. Johns | January 18, 1980 |
| Philip Parmelee Clinton County Informational Designation | | Capital Region International Airport | DeWitt Township | November 7, 1977 |
| Henry M. Perrin-Dr. Henry Palmer House | | 903 North Clinton Avenue | St. Johns | February 25, 1988 |
| Rochester Colony | | Friendship Park, Maple Road | DuPlain Township | September 23, 1970 |
| Saint Mary's Church / Westphalia Settlement Informational Designation | | 201 North Westphalia Street | Westphalia | July 17, 1986 |
| Saint Peter Evangelical Lutheran Church | | 8990 Church Road | St. Johns | September 21, 1988 |
| Joshua Simmons II Burial Place | | North Eagle Cemetery, Grange Road, south of Howe Road | Eagle Township | September 17, 1974 |
| G. D. Sowers House | | 131 East Williams Street | Ovid | February 15, 1990 |
| St. John's Church | | North Mead Street and East Walker Street | St. Johns | February 23, 1981 |
| St. Johns Union School† | | 205 West Baldwin Street | St. Johns | February 27, 1980 |
| Steel Hotel (Demolished) | | US-27 and M-21 | St. Johns | February 11, 1972 |

== See also ==
- National Register of Historic Places listings in Clinton County, Michigan

== Sources ==
- Historic Sites Online – Clinton County. Michigan State Housing Developmental Authority. Accessed January 23, 2011.
