= Eureka, Michigan =

- Census-designated place (CDP) & unincorporated community
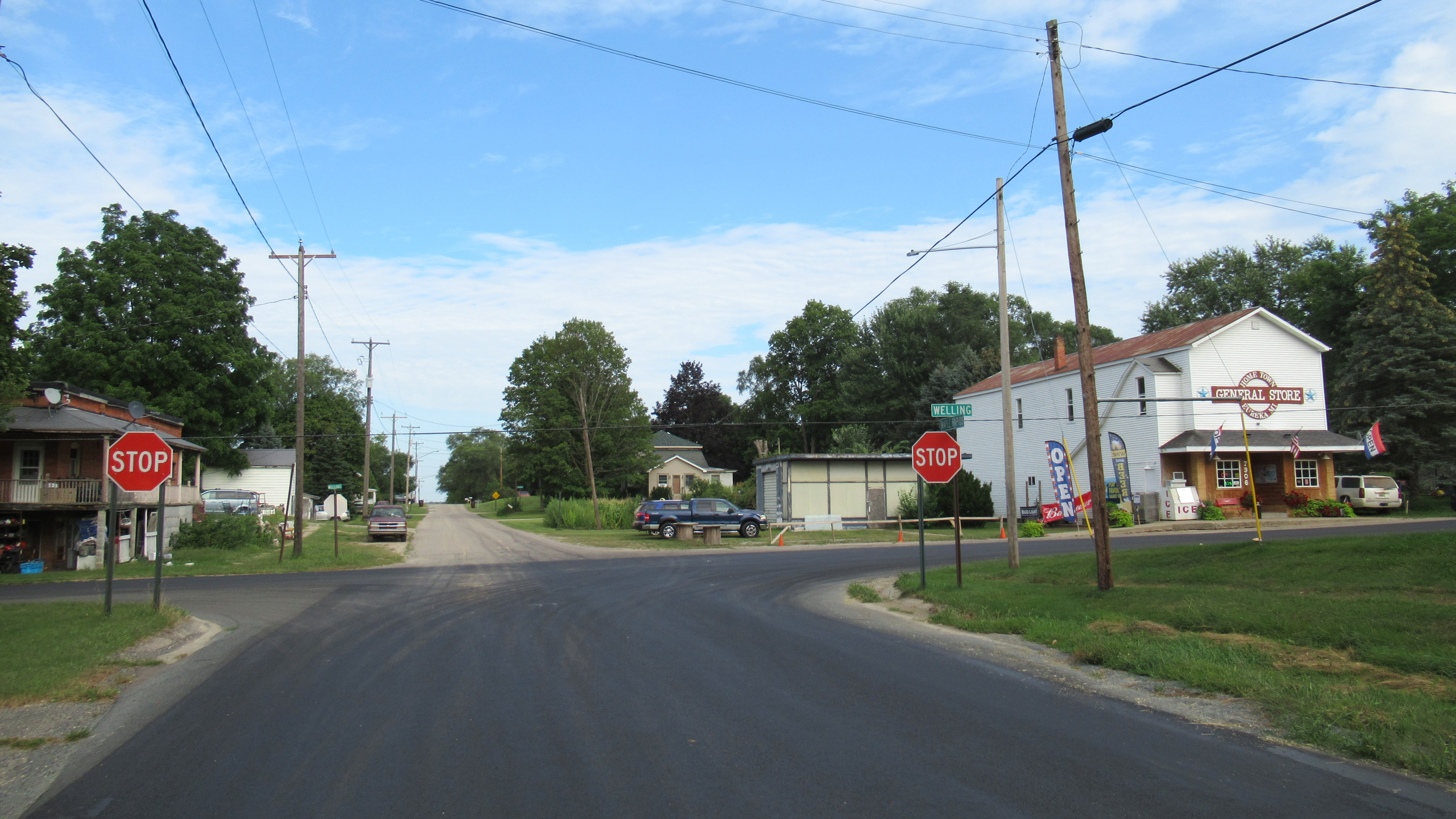
- Intersection of Maple Rapids and Welling Road

- Location within the state of Michigan Location within the United States
- Coordinates: 43°06′13″N 84°30′49″W
- Country: United States
- State: Michigan
- County: Clinton
- Township: Greenbush
- Settled: 1836

Area
  - Total: 1.01 sq mi (2.61 km^{2})
  - Land: 1.01 sq mi (2.61 km^{2})
  - Water: 0 sq mi (0.00 km^{2})
- Elevation: 725 ft (221 m)

Population (2020)
  - Total: 233
  - Density: 230.69/sq mi (89.07/km^{2})
- Time zone: UTC-5 (Eastern (EST))
  - Summer (DST): UTC-4 (EDT)
- ZIP code(s): 48831 (Elsie); 48833; 48879 (St. Johns)
- Area code: 989
- GNIS feature ID: 2804347

Eureka is an unincorporated community and census-designated place (CDP) in Clinton County in the U.S. state of Michigan. The population of the CDP was 233 at the 2020 census. The community is located within Greenbush Township.

As an unincorporated community, Eureka has no legal autonomy of its own, but does have its own post office with the 48833 ZIP Code.

== Geography ==
Eureka is located in northeastern Greenbush Township in Clinton County. It is centrally located in the state's Lower Peninsula about 30 miles (48 km) north of Lansing and 40 miles (64 km) south of Mount Pleasant.

U.S. Route 127 runs south–north about 3.0 miles (4.8 km) west of the community and is accessible via Maple Rapids Road. Other nearby communities include the village of Maple Rapids to the west, the village of Elsie to the east, the village of Ashley to the north, and the cities of Ovid and St. Johns to the south. Halterman Creek flows through the community.

Eureka is served by St. Johns Public Schools. Eureka Elementary School is located within the community. The community has its own post office using the 48833 ZIP Code, although this post office is primarily used for post office box services. The St. Johns 48879 ZIP Code also serves the community. Areas to the east of Welling Road may use the Elsie 48831 ZIP Code.

== History ==
The area was first settled in 1836 by John Ferdon. The new settlement was first known as Williamsport after early settler Clark Williams. The community was soon known as Barrington for another settler J. A. Barrington. Again, the community's name was known as Swizzletown. The community received its first post office under the name Greenbush on January 29, 1844, which was named after the township. On May 9, 1867, the post office and community were renamed Eureka, which was the name given by Edward Stark using the word eureka "as a place where he had found and others would find a fine place for doing business."

The post office was discontinued on June 29, 1935. It was ultimately reestablished on September 6, 1949. The post office remains in operation and is located at 7907 North Welling Road in the center of the community.

The Eureka Cemetery is located on Hyde Road just south of the center of the community. The cemetery remains active, and its oldest gravesite dates back to 1839.

For the 2020 census, Eureka was included as a newly listed census-designated place, which is included for statistical purposes only. Eureka continues to remain an unincorporated community with no legal autonomy of its own.

== Demographics ==
Historical population
Census	Pop.	Note	%±
2020	233		—
U.S. Decennial Census

== Notable people ==
- LaRue Kirby, a professional baseball player, was born in Eureka

== Images ==
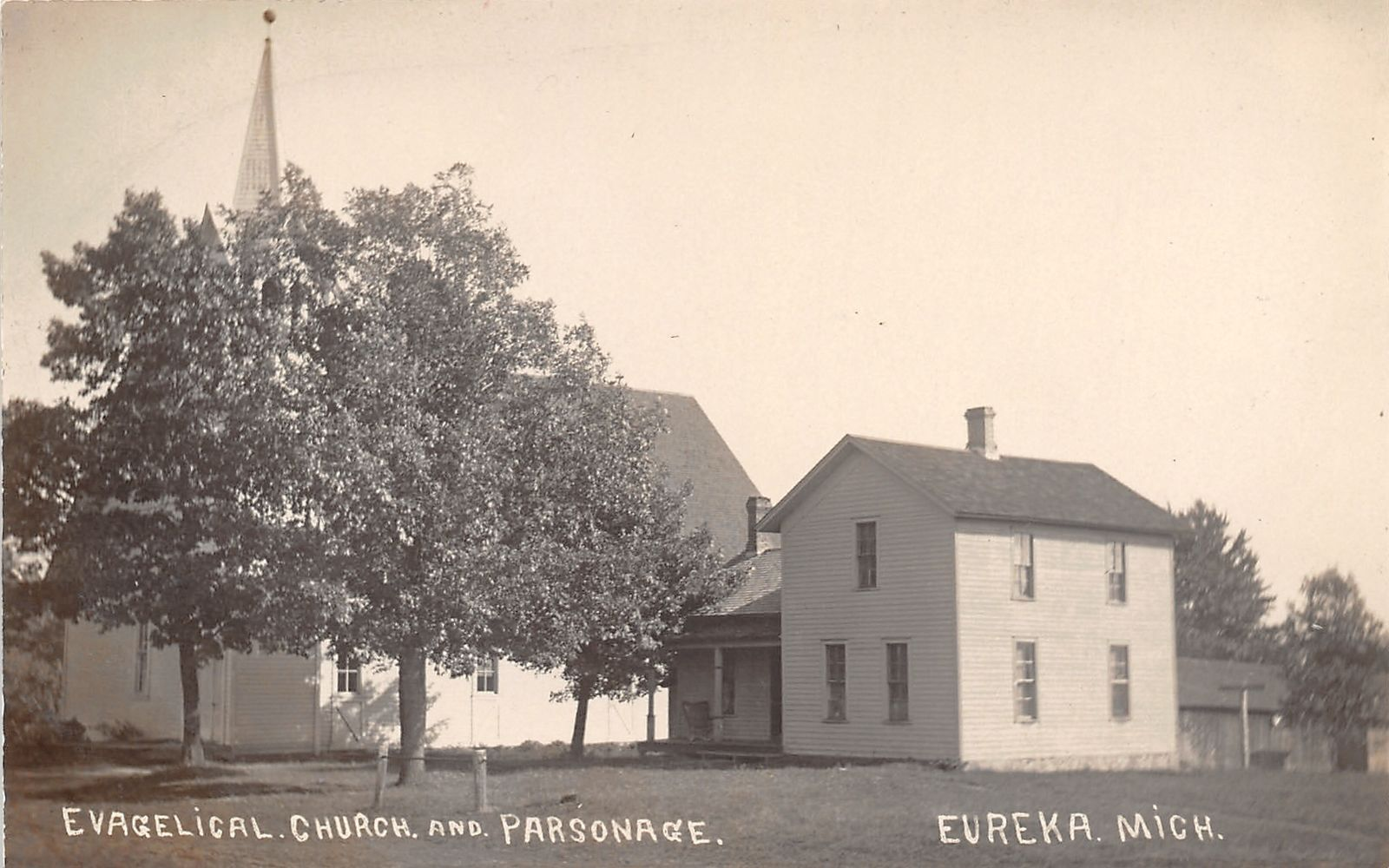
Evangelical Church in Eureka (1910)

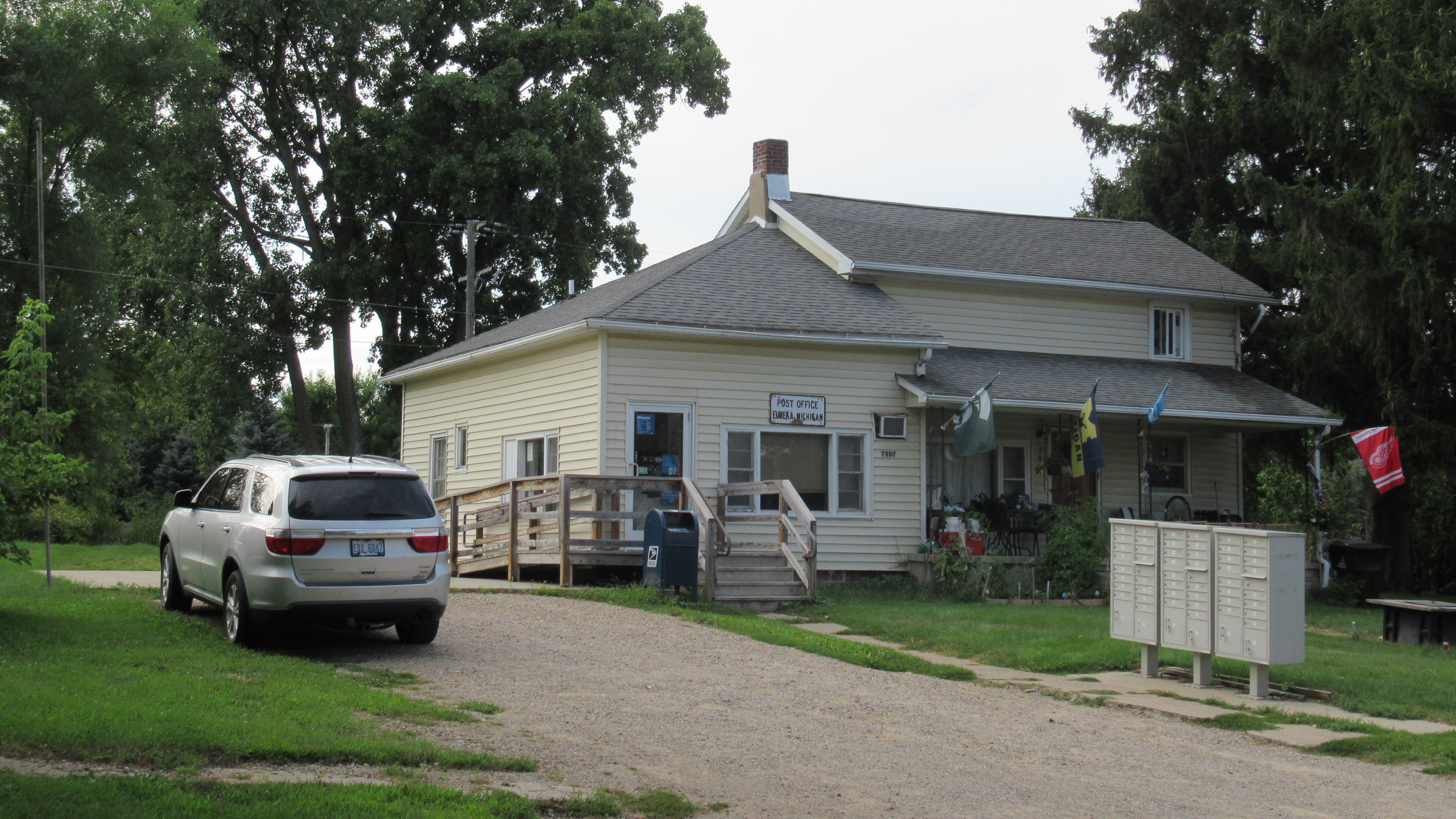
U.S. Post Office in Eureka

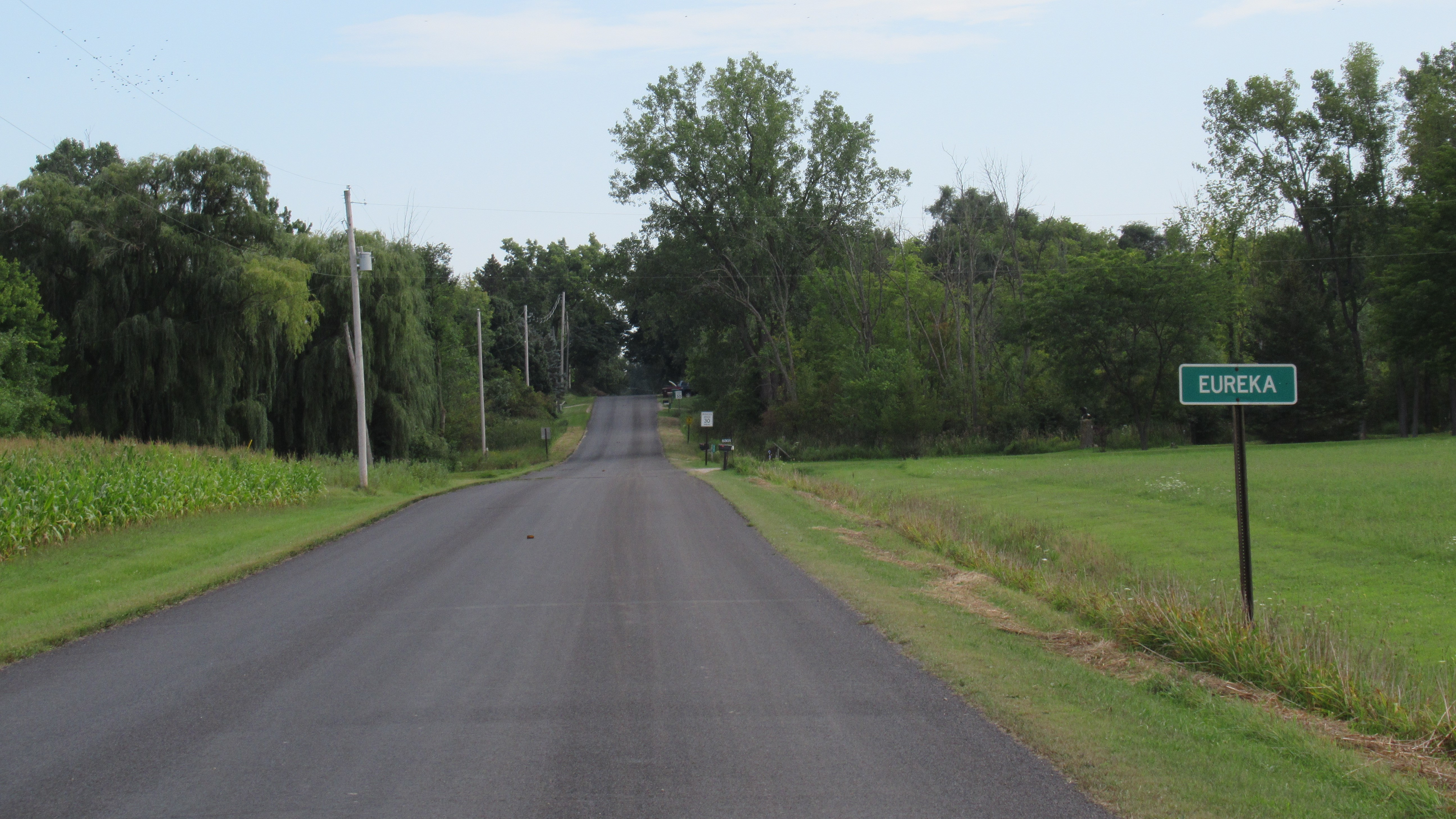
Signage along N. Welling Road
