= Ovid-Elsie Area Schools =

School district in Michigan, United States

Address
- 8989 E. Colony Rd. Elsie, Clinton County, Michigan, 48831; United States

District information
- Motto: A world-class school district.
- Grades: Pre-Kindergarten-12
- Superintendent: Mark Horak
- Schools: 5
- Budget: $20,701,000 2021-2022 expenditures
- NCES District ID: 2627150

Students and staff
- Students: 1,275 (2024-2025)
- Teachers: 79.9 (on an FTE basis) (2024-2025)
- Staff: 195.05 FTE (2024-2025)
- Student–teacher ratio: 15.96 (2024-2025)

Other information
- Website: www.ovidelsie.org

Ovid-Elsie Area Schools is a public school district in Central Michigan.

== Geographic Area ==
In Clinton County, it serves Elsie, Ovid, and parts of the townships of Duplain, Greenbush, Ovid, and Victor. In Gratiot County, it serves parts of the townships of Elba and Washington. In Saginaw County, it serves part of Chapin Township. In Shiawassee County, it serves Fairfield Township and parts of the townships of Middlebury, Owosso, Rush, and Sciota.

== History ==
In 1866, Ovid's first school was established. In 1871, a brick school was built, but it burned in 1906. The rebuilt school, opened in 1907, burned down in 1925. It was also rebuilt. The district and its school, which also housed a high school, consolidated with Elsie's school district in 1964. Elsie has had a high school since at least 1901, when that year's graduating ceremony was discussed in a local newspaper.

Elsie and Ovid's districts consolidated in spring 1964. In 1965, construction began on the new high school, and Leonard Elementary, as well. The existing Ovid and Elsie high schools were converted into junior high buildings, and the existing grade schools were expanded. Students and staff moved into the new high school on March 10, 1967. The district celebrated open houses and dedications for the new schools on October 1, 1967.

On April 4, 1978, the district began operating WOES-FM, which as of 2026 is the highest-powered high school radio station in the state.

In 1986, a citizens' advisory council found that the junior high schools were greatly in need of repair and renovation. On Friday, February 16, 1990, both schools were closed by the school board when inspections found that their roofs were in danger of collapse. The seventh and eighth grades moved to the high school site, some in portable classrooms.

A new middle school was built on the site of the high school in 1996.

== Schools ==
Schools in Ovid-Elsie Area Schools district
School	Address	Notes
Ovid-Elsie High School	8989 E. Colony Rd., Elsie	Grades 9-12. Built 1967.
Ovid-Elsie Middle School	4041 N. Hollister Rd., Elsie	Grades 6-8. Built 1996.
Leonard Elementary	732 Mabbitt Rd., Ovid	Grades PreK-2. Built 1967.
E.E. Knight Elementary	8989 E. Colony Rd., Elsie	Grades 3-5
Ovid-Elsie Alternative High School	732 Mabbitt Rd., Ovid	Grades 9-12. Shares a building with Leonard Elementary.
