= WOES =

Radio station at Ovid-Elsie High School in Ovid-Elsie, Michigan

- Ovid-Elsie, Michigan; United States
- Broadcast area
- Frequency: 91.3 MHz
- Branding: The Polka Palace

Programming
- Format: Polka music

Ownership
- Owner: Ovid-Elsie Area Schools

History
- First air date: April 4, 1978
- Call sign meaning: Ovid-Elsie Area Schools

Technical information
- Facility ID: 50794
- Class: A
- ERP: 550 watts
- Transmitter coordinates: 43.046°N 84.387°W

Links
- Website: WOES Online

WOES (91.3 MHz) is a non-commercial educational high school radio station that broadcasts from Ovid-Elsie High School in the U.S. state of Michigan. It is known as "The Polka Palace".

WOES began broadcasting radio in the Ovid-Elsie area on April 4, 1978, with 10 watts of power which increased to 553 watts in November 1981. In September 1997, it began broadcasting 24 hours/7 days/365 days per year. Internet radio broadcasting began on May 1, 2000.

WOES is the highest-powered high school radio station in Michigan. It offers a variety of programming including music, news, and sports. Hosts include student and community DJs.

Former logo

== Sources ==
- Michiguide.com - WOES History
