= Grist Mill Bridge, Dam and Mill Site =

Archaeological site in Michigan, United States

- U.S. National Register of Historic Places
- U.S. Historic district
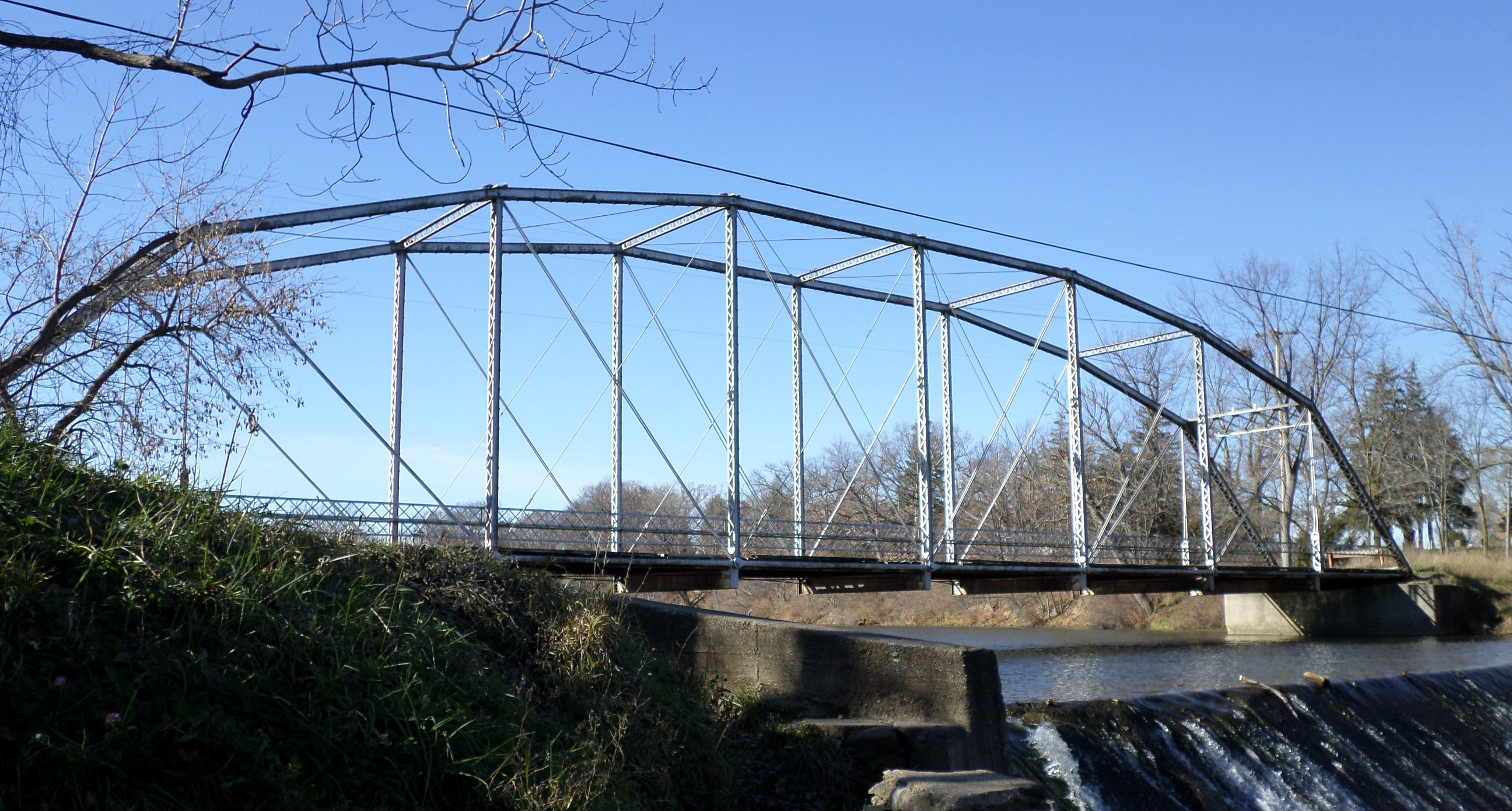

- Location within Michigan Location within the United States
- Interactive map
- Location: Upton Rd. from Island Rd. to Maple R., Duplain Township, Michigan
- Coordinates: 43°5′24″N 84°24′21″W
- Built: 1865, 1901, 1912
- Built by: Detroit Bridge & Iron Works
- NRHP reference No.: 15000295
- Added to NRHP: June 1, 2015

The Grist Mill Bridge, Dam and Mill Site consists of three structures located along Upton Road between Island Road and the Maple River, one-half mile west of Elsie, Michigan in Duplain Township. The three structures are:

- Upton Road Bridge, the last known surviving metal truss highway bridge in Michigan built by Detroit Bridge & Iron Works, and one of only three remaining Parker truss bridges in Michigan.
- Elsie Mill Pond Dam, a rock and earth-filled dam with a concrete cap and spillway.
- Kellogg Bros. & Johnson Mill Site (designated archaeological site 20CL144), the foundation and associated remains of the 1865 Kellogg Bros. & Johnson grist mill.

The structures were listed on the National Register of Historic Places in 2015.

== History ==
Duplain Township was first settled in the 1830s. In about 1845, Robert E. Craven (likely with his brothers Joseph and Thomas) constructed a saw-mill at this site. The saw mill operated for nearly 20 years. In 1865, Kellogg Bros. and Johnson purchased the site from Craven's estate and replaced the sawmill with a larger grist/flour mill, and built a timber dam to help power operations at the mill. Around the same time, a bridge was constructed crossing the Maple River a few hundred feet from the location of the current bridge, at the time carrying Upton Road over the Maple River. The grist mill operated for a number of years, going through multiple owners.

In 1901, Duplain Township voted to allocate money to replace the Upton Road bridge. The Detroit Bridge & Iron Works was contracted to build the steel superstructure of the bridge for $2,590. With planking, abutments, and labor, the total cost of the bridge was $3,228.57. In 1912, the current earth-and-concrete Elsie Mill Pond dam was constructed, replacing the 1865 timber version. The mill continued operating until 1950. In 1953, the building was remodeled and reopened as a feed and grain elevator. In 1966, a new Maple River crossing on Island Road was constructed, and the Upton Road bridge was closed to traffic.

The mill burned in 1969, leaving only the foundation remnants seen today. In 1976, Duplain Township, with the assistance of the Elsie Lions Club, turned the area into a park.

On August 17, 2023, the mill dam partially failed, and the township board voted to go forward with removal instead of reconstruction of the damaged dam the following month.

== Description ==
The Grist Mill site is located on the Maple River. The Upton Road Bridge spans the river, approximately sixty feet west of the dam. The mill site is located directly on the southern bank of the river, about 75 feet east of the dam. Duplain Township owns the site and maintains it as a park.

=== Upton Road Bridge ===
The Upton Road bridge is a single-span steel Parker truss bridge with pinned connections, sitting on concrete abutments. It spans 160 feet and is 16 feet wide. The deck consists of wooden planks laid atop the steel stingers, with wooden paving blocks on top, and a final layer of asphalt.

=== Grist Mill Dam ===
The Grist Mill Dam is approximately 150 feet long and twelve to fifteen feet high. The main body of the dam is constructed from rock and earth-fill, and a concrete cap and spillway is placed on top. The spillway spans the entirety of the dam, and empties onto a nearly flat concrete apron five to seven feet in wide, and then onto a lower spillway. Concrete abutments are built at each end of the dam.

=== Kellogg Bros. & Johnson Grist Mill Site ===
The site of the former grist mill contains a rubble fieldstone retaining wall, along with foundation walls of the mill and millrace. The mill foundation is in an L-shape, with walls 75 to 85 feet long on the longer side, and twenty feet in the shorter. The walls range up to 15 feet in height. There is also evidence of two flumes running from the mill pond to the mill.

== See also ==
- List of bridges on the National Register of Historic Places in Michigan
- National Register of Historic Places listings in Clinton County, Michigan
