= Grist Mill Bridge =

Grist Mill Bridge may refer to:

- Grist Mill Bridge (Lebanon, Maine)
- Grist Mill Bridge, Dam and Mill Site, Elsie, Michigan
- Grist Mill Covered Bridge, Cambridge, Vermont
