= Sugar bowl (disambiguation) =

A sugar bowl is a small bowl designed for holding sugar or sugar cubes.

Sugar bowl may also refer to:

- Sugar Bowl, a college football game
  - Tulane Stadium, the game's original venue (1934–1974), sometimes informally called the "Sugar Bowl" during that time
- Sugar Bowl (St. Johns, Michigan), a commercial building in St. Johns, Michigan
- Sugar Bowl Ski Resort, a ski resort near Lake Tahoe, California
- The Sugar Bowl, a fictitious hangout in the Arthur book and television series

== Other uses ==
- Sugar bowl (legal maxim), a term used in constitutional law
