= St. Mary Church (Westphalia, Michigan) =

St. Mary's
- St. Mary Catholic Church, Westphalia
- St. Mary's
- 42°55′50.5″N 84°47′58.5″W
- Location: 201 N Westphalia St, Westphalia, Michigan 48894
- Country: United States
- Denomination: Catholic Church
- Website: stmarychurch.net

History
- Status: Active
- Founded: March 1, 1837
- Founder: Anton Kopp
- Consecrated: May 28, 1962

Architecture
- Architect: Anthony Dohmen
- Architectural type: Modified Gothic Style
- Years built: 1960–1962

Specifications
- Capacity: 1,000
- Height: 98 feet

Administration
- Archdiocese: Roman Catholic Archdiocese of Detroit
- Diocese: Roman Catholic Diocese of Lansing
- Parish: Westphalia

Clergy
- Bishop: Earl Boyea
- Priest: Eric Weber

St. Mary Parish Church is a Roman Catholic church in the Diocese of Lansing. The churn is a Modified Gothic style structure with Indiana split face stone located on Westphalia street in Westphalia, Michigan. It is also designated as a Michigan State Historic Site. Along with the church, St. Mary Parish facilities include an elementary school, youth center, funeral chapel, parish center, cemetery, rosary garden, and parish offices.

== History ==
=== Original log cabin church ===
The first settlers of Westphalia arrived in the port of New York on October 3, 1836, aboard the Leontine from the port of Bremen, Germany. Before sailing from Bremen, they had traveled by land from their home in Sauerland in the western part of Germany. These first few settlers were Father Anton Kopp, St. Mary's pioneering priest, and the Eberhard Platte family. By way of the Erie Canal, they landed in Detroit on the 25th of that same month.

Taking the advice of Father Martin Kundig of St. Mary's Parish in Detroit, Kopp and Eberhard Platte travelled to the newly established land office in the town of Ionia. After arriving at the office on November 4 and waiting six days, they finally made a purchase of 560 acres which would one day become the home of St. Mary's Parish.

The German Catholic parish was established almost immediately after the settlers first arrived. After buying the land at Ionia, Father Anton Kopp traveled back to Detroit. On November 19, the day after he arrived back in Detroit, Kopp visited Bishop Friedrich Reese and was assigned the new German parish. This appointment has great significance, "It was the beginning of the rural Catholic Church in Michigan," wrote Kopp in his journal. Kopp returned to his assigned parish in September 1837 and celebrated Masses in the homes of the settlers. In March 1838 a two-room log house, that served as the first church as well, was completed. Kopp stayed with his parish for five years, until he left for his new assignment at St. Mary's in Detroit.

=== Old St. Mary's Church ===
Built at a total cost of $70,000.00, the old church was dedicated in 1870 and stood for 92 years as a monument to the religious spirit of the Westphalia community. The brick church was the largest church in Clinton County and among the largest in the state of Michigan. With a seating capacity of 800 and a steeple height of 156 feet, the church was built in 1867 under the leadership of Father George Godez, successor to Kopp. The bricks for the church were made in the Westphalia brickyard, and the interior finish of the church and the pews were made of black walnut from the trees in the hardwood forests surrounding the town.

==== Fire at the church ====
On April 20, 1959, Old St. Mary's caught fire during repair work of the eaves. Nearly 100 firemen from the surrounding area were called in to assist with the flames. Although confined to the one side of the roof for a short time, the flames swept through the heavy timber beams and soon spread to all sides of the copper-covered roof. Using the aerial ladder unit from Lansing, firemen tried to contain the blaze by hacking holes in the roof and pouring in water, but the flames out-raced them. Father Aloysius Miller and his assistant, Father Robert Stockwell, carried out the Blessed Sacrament, chalices, and the other holy vessels used at Mass. Twelve men were needed to carry the pulpit from the burning church.

=== St. Mary Church today ===
St. Mary Church is a Gothic Style church constructed across the street from the original brick church. The church was blessed and held its first mass on May 28, 1962. Built from 1959 to 1962, the church was created with Indiana split face stone, sand stone trim, and slate roofing. The bell tower rises to 98 feet (30 m). The three bells, cast in Holland, were selected for their close resemblance to the old church bells. The three bells are named St. Mary, St. Joseph, and St. Boniface - The patron saint of Germany.

== Interior ==
=== Statues ===
A life-sized figure of Christ crucified surrounded by a mosaic sunburst design, which depicts the hope and joy of Christ's death and resurrection. A bronze baldachin, which extends from above the crucifix, was added to draw attention to the solemn celebrations performed on the altar below.

There are five marble statues sculpted of Florentine marble and located primarily in the transepts of the church. In the south Transept is a statue of the Blessed Mother. In the North Transept stands the statue of St. Joseph and then one of St. Anne in the shrine area. A small statue of the Infant of Prague is located between the north transept and the main part of the sanctuary.

Additionally, a hand-crafted statue of the Blessed Mother with the Christ Child was originally erected above the main altar of the old church in 1870, and rescued from the fire in 1959.

=== Mosaics ===
Five mosaic icons, designed and made in Venice, Italy, are found in St. Mary Church. A special mosaic located next to the pulpit is the icon of Our Lady of Perpetual Help. In the south Transept shire area are mosaics of St. Aloysius and St. Pius X. In the north transept are mosaics of St. Jude and St. Isidore.

=== Paintings ===
On the north side of the back wall of the church hangs the painting of the 14 Holy Helpers. (St. George, St. Blaise, St. Erasmus, St. Vitus, St. Pantaleon, St. Christopher, St. Denis, St. Cyriacus, St. Agathius, St. Eustace, St. Giles, St. Margaret, St. Catherine, and St. Barbara.)

On the south side of the back wall hangs the painting commissioned on the 100th Anniversary of St. Mary parish. This displays the original log cabin church created in 1837, as well as the 2nd church created in 1870.

=== Stained glass windows ===
In the sanctuary are windows depicting God's loving care for his people. Stain glasses include Moses striking the rock in the desert to get water for the Israelites, Jesus multiplying the loaves and fishes and feeding his followers, Jesus at the last supper, and St. Pius X, the pope who extended the privilege of receiving the eucharist to the young.

The large windows in the north transept symbolizes the old testament, which includes the crowns of the three kings of Israel, and King David. The symbols on each side show the prophecy was fulfilled through Mary.

The large windows in the south transept symbolizes the new testament, which includes an altar with heart pierced thorns, and more symbols of Mary's part in salvation.

In the nave of the church are ten windows that depict events in the life of Mary. The five windows on the south side illustrate the five joyful mysteries of the rosary, and the five windows on the north depict scenes from both the glorious and sorrowful mysteries, as well as the wedding feast of cana. The main window found in the back of the church above the choir loft is called "Our New Lady of Westphalia". This 11×22-foot window was created and designed to summarize Westphalia, its people as Americans, farmers and shop workers, as well as people of Faith. The window includes images of the church, a tractor, a farm, and a factory. The United States is symbolized by stars and stripes. The communion of people in the church on each and the communion of saints are depicted on Our Lady's mantle. These are all incorporated in Mary suppressing the serpent.

== See also ==
- Ardeth Platte
- Joseph Rademacher
- Old St. Mary Church Detroit
- St. Mary Cathedral Lansing
