= Bingham Township, Clinton County, Michigan =

Bingham Township, Michigan
- Civil township
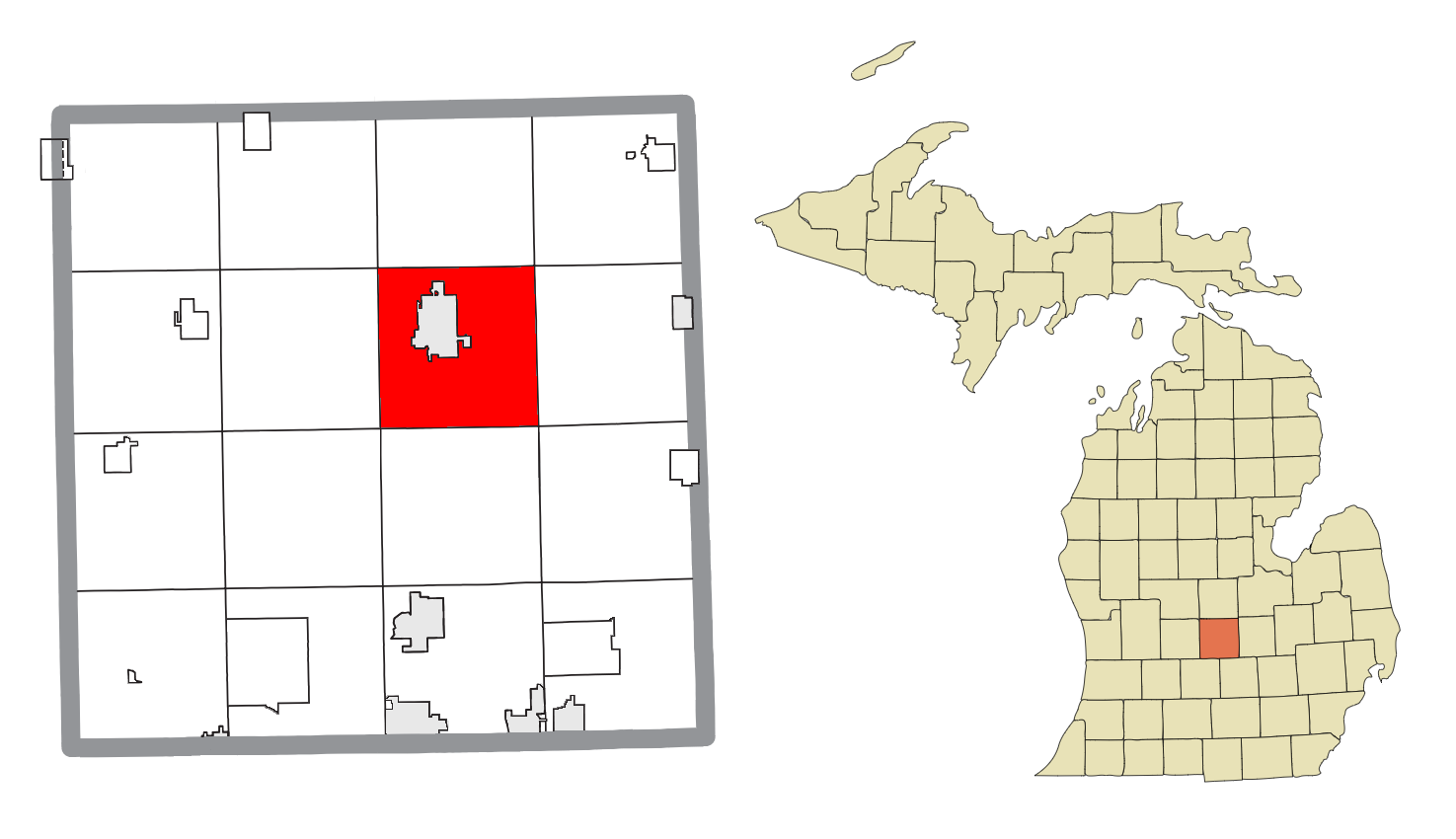
- Location within Clinton County

- Location within the state of Michigan Location within the United States
- Coordinates: 42°59′13″N 84°32′32″W
- Country: United States
- State: Michigan
- County: Clinton
- Settled: 1841

Government
  - Supervisor: J. Eric Silm
  - Clerk: Alysha Chant

Area
  - Total: 32.41 sq mi (83.94 km^{2})
  - Land: 32.39 sq mi (83.89 km^{2})
  - Water: 0.019 sq mi (0.05 km^{2})
- Elevation: 748 ft (228 m)

Population (2020)
  - Total: 2,919
  - Density: 90.12/sq mi (34.80/km^{2})
- Time zone: UTC-5 (Eastern (EST))
  - Summer (DST): UTC-4 (EDT)
- ZIP code(s): 48879 (St. Johns)
- Area code: 989
- FIPS code: 26-08400
- GNIS feature ID: 1625937
- Website: Official website

Bingham Township is a civil township of Clinton County in the U.S. state of Michigan. As of the 2020 census, the township had a population of 2,919.

The township is named for politician Kinsley S. Bingham, who served as Michigan's 11th governor and also a U.S. representative and senator. Bingham Township surrounds the city of St. Johns, but the two are administered autonomously.

== History ==
Bingham Township was first settled in 1841.

== Geography ==
According to the United States Census Bureau, the township has a total area of 32.41 square miles (83.94 km^{2}), of which 32.39 square miles (83.89 km^{2}) is land and 0.02 square miles (0.05 km^{2}) (0.06%) is water.

The township is located northeast of the center of Clinton County. It surrounds the city of St. Johns, the county seat. U.S. Route 127 crosses the township, with access from exits 96 and 99. US 127 runs north to Mount Pleasant and south to Lansing, the state capital. M-21 leads east to Owosso and west to Ionia.

== Demographics ==
As of the census of 2000, there were 2,776 people, 868 households, and 691 families residing in the township. The population density was 85.8 inhabitants per square mile (33.1/km^{2}). There were 954 housing units at an average density of 29.5 per square mile (11.4/km^{2}). The racial makeup of the township was 97.55% White, 0.32% Native American, 0.36% Asian, 1.08% from other races, and 0.68% from two or more races. Hispanic or Latino of any race were 2.56% of the population.

There were 868 households, out of which 40.8% had children under the age of 18 living with them, 67.9% were married couples living together, 8.6% had a female householder with no husband present, and 20.3% were non-families. 16.0% of all households were made up of individuals, and 5.0% had someone living alone who was 65 years of age or older. The average household size was 2.87 and the average family size was 3.23.

In the township the population was spread out, with 26.9% under the age of 18, 6.6% from 18 to 24, 27.6% from 25 to 44, 21.3% from 45 to 64, and 17.6% who were 65 years of age or older. The median age was 38 years. For every 100 females, there were 95.5 males. For every 100 females age 18 and over, there were 87.3 males.

The median income for a household in the township was $52,853, and the median income for a family was $58,833. Males had a median income of $38,929 versus $30,327 for females. The per capita income for the township was $18,047. About 4.5% of families and 5.5% of the population were below the poverty line, including 8.1% of those under age 18 and 6.4% of those age 65 or over.
