= Louis Filler =

American historian (1911–1998)

Louis Filler (August 27, 1911 – December 22, 1998) was a Russian-born American teacher and a widely published scholar specializing in American studies.

He was born in Dubăsari, in the Kherson Governorate of the Russian Empire (now in Moldova), to Jewish parents, and emigrated to the United States in 1914. Raised in Philadelphia, Filler attended Central High School. He received his bachelor's degree from Temple University in 1934, and his master's degree (1941) and doctorate (1943) from Columbia University.

He worked as a historian for the American Council of Learned Societies from 1942 to 1944 and then as a research historian for the Quartermaster General in Washington, D.C., from 1944 to 1946. He taught at Antioch College in Yellow Springs, Ohio, first as professor of American civilization from 1953 until 1976, and then as Distinguished University Professor of American Culture and Society, beginning in 1976.

His scholarly writings focused on muckrakers, abolition, and other reform movements. He also edited anthologies and other scholarly works.

He was a Fulbright Scholar at the University of Bristol, England, for the academic year 1950-1951 and at the University of Erlangen in Germany for the academic year 1979–80.

He lived in Ovid, Michigan and died on December 22, 1998, in Austin, Texas.

== Awards ==
- Fellow, Social Science Research Council and American Council of Learned Societies, 1953–54
- Ohioana Book Award in nonfiction, 1961, for Crusade against Slavery

== Works ==
=== Books ===
- Crusaders for American Liberalism: The Story of the Muckrakers, 1939 ff. (1993 as The Muckrakers)
- Randolph Bourne, 1943, 1965
- Laundry and Related Activities of the Quartermaster General, United States Government Printing Office, 1946
- The Crusade Against Slavery, 1830-1860, 1960 ff
- A Dictionary of American Social Reform, 1963, 1970; revised 1982 as A Dictionary of American Social Change
- The Unknown Edwin Markham: His Mystery and Its Significance, 1966
- Muckraking and Progressivism: an Interpretive Bibliography, 1976
- Appointment at Armageddon: Muckraking and Progressivism in American Life, 1976; Muckraking and Progressivism in the American Tradition, new intro, 1996
- Voice of the Democracy: A Critical Biography of David Graham Phillips: Journalist, Novelist, Progressive, 1978
- Abolition and Social Justice in the Era of Reform, 1972
- Crusade Against Slavery: Friends, Foes, and Reforms 1820-1860, 1986
- Dictionary of American Conservatism, 1987
- Distinguished Shades: Americans Whose Lives Live On, 1992

=== Edited works ===
- The New Stars: Life and Labor in Old Missouri, Manie Kendley Morgan, 1940
- Mr. Dooley: Now and Forever, Finley Peter Dunne, 1954
- The Removal of the Cherokee Nation: Manifest Destiny or National Dishonor?, 1962, 1977
- The World of Mr. Dooley, Finley Peter Dunne, 1962
- Late Nineteenth-Century Liberalism: Representative Selections 1880-1900, 1962, 1978
- The Anxious Years - America in the Nineteen Thirties: A Collection of Contemporary Writings, 1963; as American Anxieties, 1993
- Horace Mann and Others, Robert L. Straker, 1963
- Democrats and Republicans: Ten Years of the Republic, Harry Thurston Peck, 1964
- A History of the People of the United States, John Bach McMaster, 1964
- The President Speaks: From McKinley to Lyndon Johnson, 1964
- Horace Mann on the Crisis in Education, 1965; Spanish translation 1972
- Wendell Phillips on Civil Rights and Freedom, 1965
- The Ballad of the Gallows-Bird, Edwin Markham, 1967
- Old Wolfville: Chapters from the Fiction of A.H. Lewis, 1968
- Slavery in the United States, 1972, 1998
- Abolition and Social Justice, 1972
- From Populism to Progressivism, 1978, anthology
- A Question of Quality, series : Popularity and Value in Modern Creative Writing and Seasoned Authors for a New Season, 1976–80
- Vanguards and Followers: Youth in the American Tradition, 1978, 1995
- An Ohio Schoolmistress: the Memoirs of Irene Hardy, 1980
- Contemporaries: Portraits in the Progressive Era, David Graham Phillips, 1981
- The President in the 20th Century, 1983

=== Introductions ===
- Ernest Lacy, Chatterton, 1952
- John Bach McMaster, The Acquisition of Political, Social and Industrial Rights of Man in America, 1961
- S.S. McClure, My Autobiography, 1962
- G. Lowes Dickinson,A Modern Symposium, 1963
- Robert Lincoln Straker, Horace Mann and Others: Chapters from the History of Antioch College, 1963
- Svend Petersen, A Statistical History of the American Presidential Elections, 1963
- Bernard Mandel, Samuel Gompers: A Biography, 1963
- John Bach McMaster, The Political Depravity of the Founding Fathers, 1964
- William Henry Smith, A Political History of Slavery, 1966
- Ulrich B. Phillips, Georgia and States' Rights, 1967
- Madeleine B. Stern, The Pantarch: A Biography of Stephen Pearl Andrews, 1968
- David Graham Phillips, The Cost, 1969
- David Graham Phillips, The Deluge, 1969
- David Graham Phillips, The Grain of Dust, 1970
- Brand Whitlock, Forty Years of It, 1970
- William Hapgood, The Columbia Conserve Company: An Experiment in Workers' Management and Ownership, 1975
- Benjamin A. Botkin, The American People: Stories, Legends, Folklore|Tales, Traditions and Songs, 1998

=== Also in published volumes ===
- "Movements to Abolish the Death Penalty in the United States," in Murder and the Death Penalty, 1952
- "The Dilemma, So-Called, of the American Liberal," in Antioch Review Anthology, 1953
- "The Muckrakers: in Flower and in Failure," in Essays in American Historiography: in Honor of Allan Nevins, 1960
- "Anti-Slavery Movements in the United States," in Collier’s Encyclopedia, 1962
- "Slavery and Anti-Slavery," in Main Problems in American History, 1964
- "A Tale of Two Authors: Theodore Dreiser and David Graham Phillips," in New Voices in American Studies, 1966

=== Among other articles and reviews ===
- "Susan Lenox: an American Odyssey," Accent, Fall 1940
- "Wolfville: the Fiction of A.H. Lewis," New Mexico] Quarterly, Spring, 1943
- "Murder in Gramercy Park," Antioch Review 11, December 1946
- "Edward Bellamy and the Spirited Unrest," American Journal of Economics and Sociology, April 1948
- "Randolph Bourne: Reality and Myth," The Humanist, Spring 1951
- "Harry Alan Potamkin," Midwest Journal, Winter 1951
- "Why Historians Ignore Folklore," Midwest Folklore, Summer 1954
- "John Chamberlain and American Liberalism," Colorado Quarterly, Fall 1957
- "The Question of Social Significance," Union Review 1:1:66-71, 1962
- "John M. Harlan", Leon Friedman and Fred L. Israel, eds., The Justices of the United States Supreme Court: Their Lives and Major Opinions NY: Chelsea House Publishers, 1995), ISBN 0-7910-1377-4

=== Verse ===
- Two Poems, 1935

== Sources ==
- Ohio Center for the Book: Ohio Authors, Louis Filler
- Ohio History: About Historians, Vol. 61 (1952)
- Ohio History: About Historians Vol. 60 (1951)
