= Greenbush Township, Clinton County, Michigan =

Greenbush Township, Michigan
- Civil township
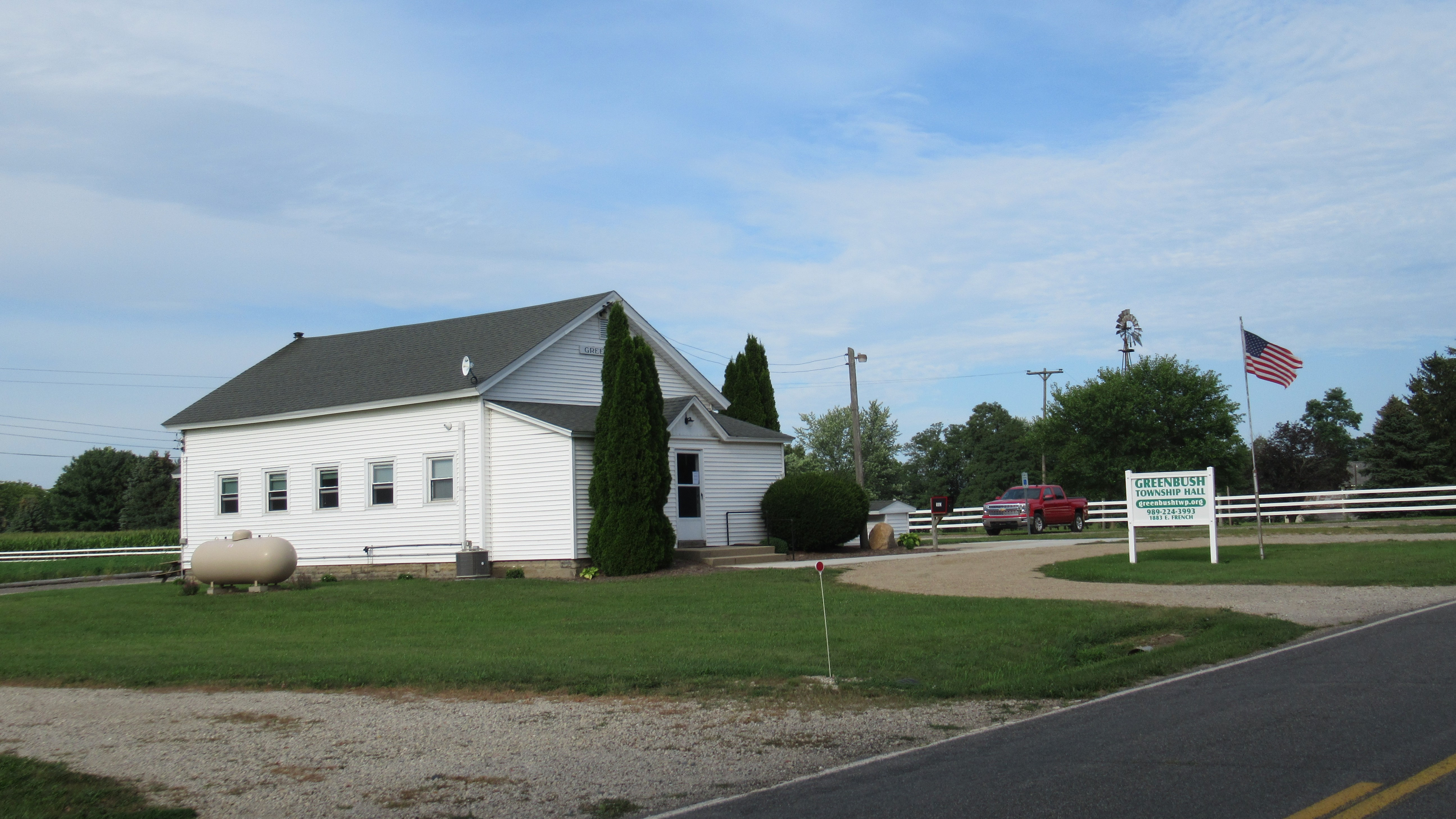
- Greenbush Township Hall

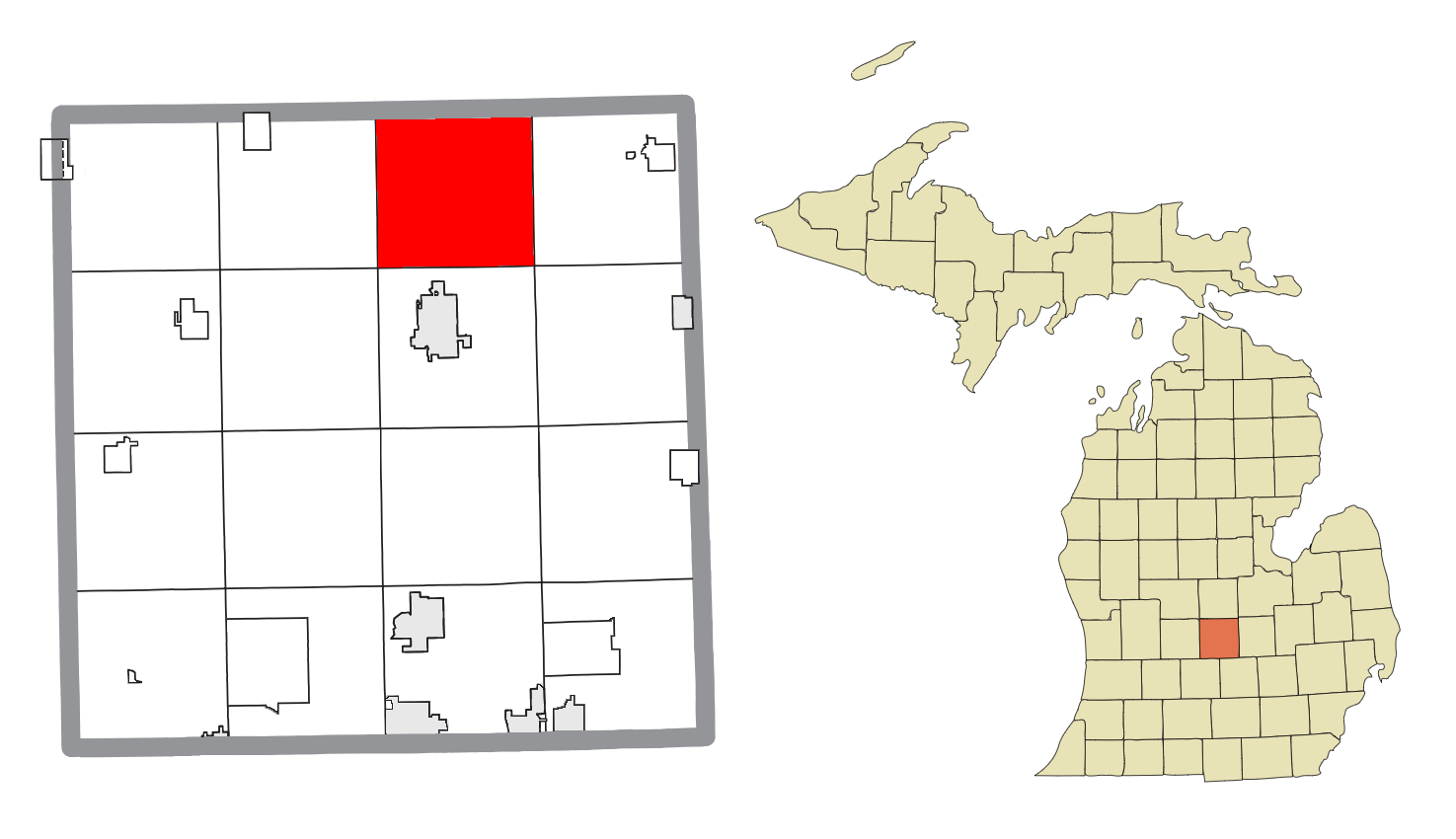
- Location within Clinton County

- Location within the state of Michigan Location within the United States
- Coordinates: 43°04′30″N 84°32′41″W
- Country: United States
- State: Michigan
- County: Clinton

Government
  - Supervisor: Lee Thelen
  - Clerk: Ramona Smith

Area
  - Total: 35.45 sq mi (91.82 km^{2})
  - Land: 35.18 sq mi (91.12 km^{2})
  - Water: 0.27 sq mi (0.70 km^{2})
- Elevation: 728 ft (222 m)

Population (2020)
  - Total: 2,143
  - Density: 60.91/sq mi (23.52/km^{2})
- Time zone: UTC-5 (Eastern (EST))
  - Summer (DST): UTC-4 (EDT)
- ZIP code(s): 48831 (Elsie); 48833 (Eureka); 48879 (St. Johns)
- Area code: 989
- FIPS code: 26-34840
- GNIS feature ID: 1626395
- Website: Official website

Greenbush Township is a civil township of Clinton County in the U.S. state of Michigan. The population was 2,143 at the 2020 census.

== Communities ==
- Eureka is an unincorporated community and census-designated place in the northeast part of the township at 43°06′13″N 84°30′50″W.

== Geography ==
According to the United States Census Bureau, the township has a total area of 35.45 square miles (91.82 km^{2}), of which 35.18 square miles (91.12 km^{2}) is land and 0.27 square miles (0.70 km^{2}) (0.76%) is water.

Greenbush Township is located in northern Clinton County and is bordered by Gratiot County to the north. U.S. Route 127 crosses the township, leading north to Mount Pleasant and south to Lansing.

== Demographics ==
As of the census of 2000, there were 2,115 people, 743 households, and 621 families residing in the township. The population density was 60.0 inhabitants per square mile (23.2/km^{2}). There were 759 housing units at an average density of 21.5 per square mile (8.3/km^{2}). The racial makeup of the township was 98.77% White, 0.19% African American, 0.05% Native American, 0.19% Asian, 0.05% Pacific Islander, 0.33% from other races, and 0.43% from two or more races. Hispanic or Latino of any race were 1.75% of the population.

There were 743 households, out of which 37.0% had children under the age of 18 living with them, 74.3% were married couples living together, 6.2% had a female householder with no husband present, and 16.3% were non-families. 14.5% of all households were made up of individuals, and 6.5% had someone living alone who was 65 years of age or older. The average household size was 2.82 and the average family size was 3.11.

In the township the population was spread out, with 26.6% under the age of 18, 6.8% from 18 to 24, 28.9% from 25 to 44, 27.0% from 45 to 64, and 10.8% who were 65 years of age or older. The median age was 38 years. For every 100 females, there were 101.8 males. For every 100 females age 18 and over, there were 99.6 males.

The median income for a household in the township was $53,021, and the median income for a family was $57,721. Males had a median income of $40,391 versus $30,429 for females. The per capita income for the township was $21,453. About 1.7% of families and 3.3% of the population were below the poverty line, including 2.7% of those under age 18 and 3.9% of those age 65 or over.

== Notable people ==
- Irene Dunham, born in Greenbush Township, supercentenarian and final living survivor of the Bath School disaster (1907–2022)
