= First Congregational Church of Ovid =

Historic church in Michigan, United States

- Main Street Building, United Church of Ovid
- U.S. National Register of Historic Places
- Michigan State Historic Site
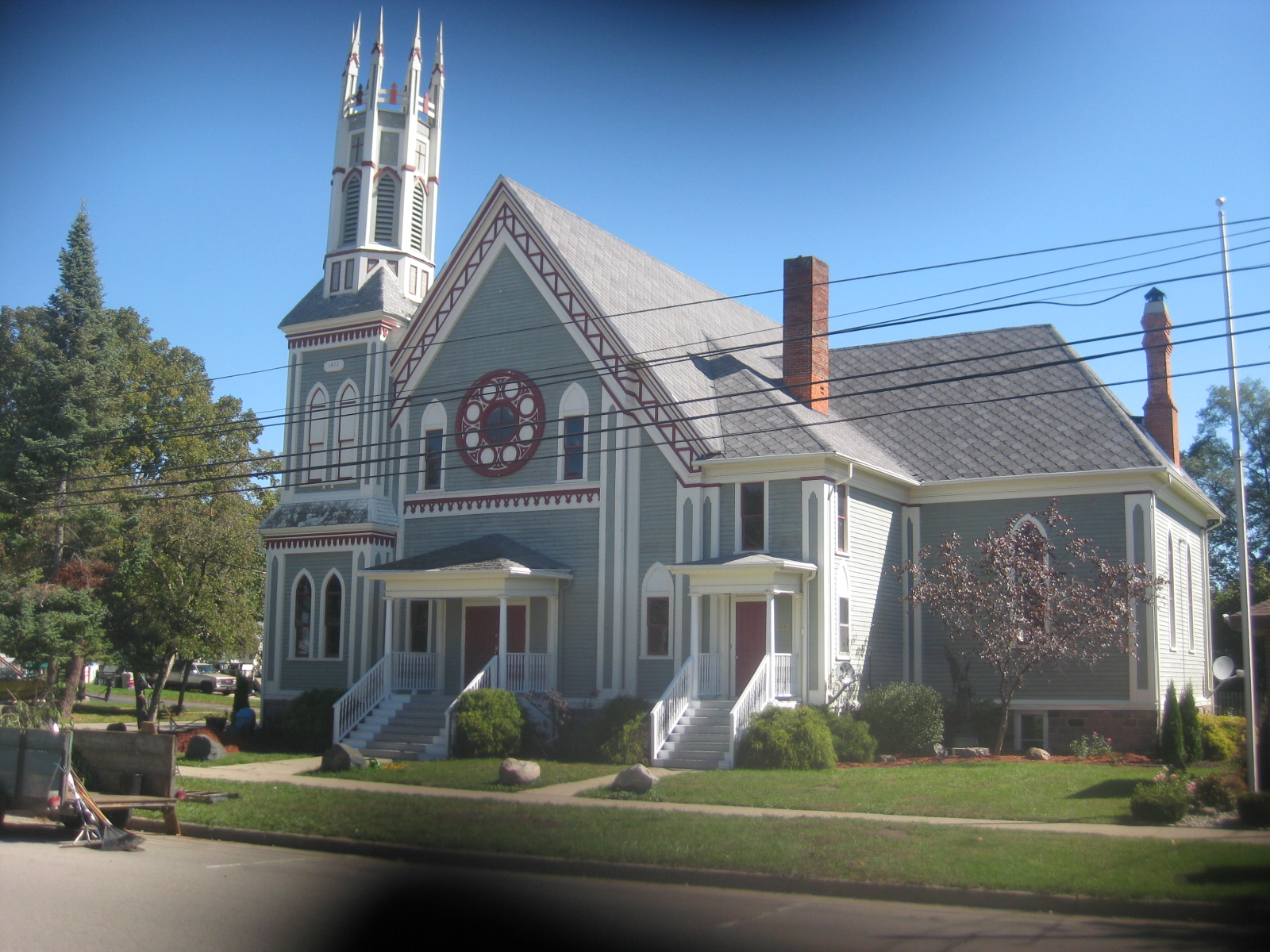

- Location within Michigan Location within the United States
- Interactive map
- Location: 222 N. Main St., Ovid, Michigan
- Coordinates: 43.0072°N 84.3714°W
- Area: less than one acre
- Built: 1872
- Built by: George Fox
- Architectural style: Gothic Revival
- NRHP reference No.: 72000607

Significant dates
- Added to NRHP: January 13, 1972
- Designated MSHS: April 23, 1971

The First Congregational Church of Ovid is a religious building in Ovid, Michigan. It was designated a Michigan State Historic Site in 1971 and listed on the National Register of Historic Places in 1972. Registered Site #: Local Site #0114

== History ==
In 1871, 22 people began Ovid's First Congregational Church with minister Reverend William Mulder. The next year, the congregation hired master carpenter George Fox to construct this building at the corner of High and Park Streets. In 1876, a bell was installed in the belfry. In 1899, with a growing congregation, the structure was moved to its current location and enlarged, adding a basement and two porticoes. In 1843, the Congregational and Methodist churches merged, using both buildings until 1972. In 1979, this church became a private residence.

== Description ==
The First Congregational Church of Ovid is a frame Gothic Revival structure, in a modified T-plan. The original section measures 34 feet (10 m) by 58 feet (18 m); later additions increase the size. It has a gable roof and clapboard-covered walls with pilaster strips at the corners. The 75 feet (23 m) tall, three-stage two-story square tower topped with an octagonal belfry contains unique decorative touches. Gothic elements include tall, narrow arch-top windows and a rose window.
