= Duplain Township, Michigan =

- Civil township
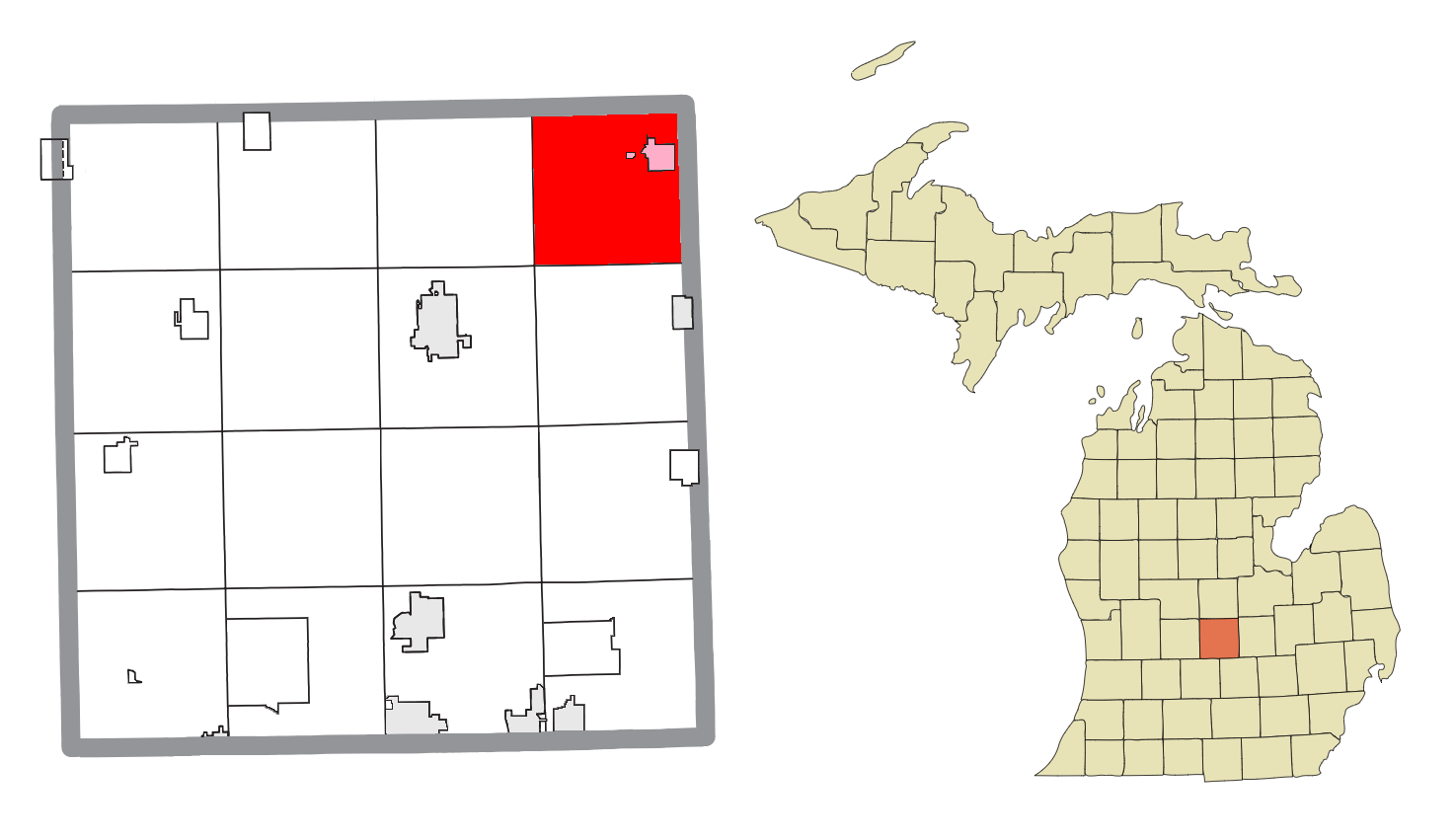
- Location within Clinton County (red) and the administrated village of Elsie (pink)

- Location within the state of Michigan Location within the United States
- Coordinates: 43°04′52″N 84°25′18″W
- Country: United States
- State: Michigan
- County: Clinton
- Established: 1840

Government
  - Supervisor: Bruce Levey
  - Clerk: Sandra Frink

Area
  - Total: 35.41 sq mi (91.71 km^{2})
  - Land: 35.12 sq mi (90.96 km^{2})
  - Water: 0.29 sq mi (0.75 km^{2})
- Elevation: 709 ft (216 m)

Population (2020)
  - Total: 2,303
  - Density: 65.58/sq mi (25.32/km^{2})
- Time zone: UTC-5 (Eastern (EST))
  - Summer (DST): UTC-4 (EDT)
- ZIP code(s): 48831 (Elsie); 48866 (Ovid); 48879 (St. Johns)
- Area codes: 517 and 989
- FIPS code: 26-23460
- GNIS feature ID: 1626197
- Website: Official website

Duplain Township is a civil township of Clinton County in the U.S. state of Michigan. The population was 2,303 at the 2020 census.

== Communities ==
- The village of Elsie is located within the township.
- Craven's Mills was platted as a village in 1845 at the time the three Craven brothers built a mill here. It was abandoned and the various stores moved to Elsie in 1857.
- Duplain is an unincorporated community in the township at 43°02′48″N 84°27′09″W on the Maple River, which was previously known by its French name, Rivière du Plain. The township was first known as Sena when set off in 1840, but became Du Plain when organized in 1841. The community was first settled by a group from Rochester, New York, and became known as the Rochester Colony. It was platted with the name Mapleton by Edward R. Everest in 1837, and a post office with that name was established on January 29, 1844. The post office was renamed Duplain on December 12, 1844, and operated until March 14, 1903.

== Geography ==
According to the United States Census Bureau, the township has a total area of 35.41 square miles (91.71 km^{2}), of which 35.12 square miles (90.96 km^{2}) is land and 0.29 square miles (0.75 km^{2}) (0.82%) is water.

Duplain Township is located in the northeast corner of Clinton County and is bordered on the east by Shiawassee County and on the north by Gratiot County.

== Demographics ==
As of the census of 2000, there were 2,329 people, 866 households, and 637 families residing in the township. The population density was 66.0 inhabitants per square mile (25.5/km^{2}). There were 900 housing units at an average density of 25.5 per square mile (9.8/km^{2}). The racial makeup of the township was 98.07% White, 0.13% African American, 0.21% Native American, 0.17% Asian, 0.94% from other races, and 0.47% from two or more races. Hispanic or Latino of any race were 2.15% of the population.

There were 866 households, out of which 34.8% had children under the age of 18 living with them, 62.4% were married couples living together, 7.9% had a female householder with no husband present, and 26.4% were non-families. 22.5% of all households were made up of individuals, and 12.8% had someone living alone who was 65 years of age or older. The average household size was 2.68 and the average family size was 3.16.

In the township the population was spread out, with 28.0% under the age of 18, 7.2% from 18 to 24, 26.7% from 25 to 44, 24.0% from 45 to 64, and 14.2% who were 65 years of age or older. The median age was 37 years. For every 100 females, there were 96.4 males. For every 100 females age 18 and over, there were 92.0 males.

The median income for a household in the township was $39,968, and the median income for a family was $46,215. Males had a median income of $35,799 versus $23,672 for females. The per capita income for the township was $16,888. About 4.8% of families and 7.5% of the population were below the poverty line, including 10.5% of those under age 18 and 6.5% of those age 65 or over.
