= East Ward School =

- Formerly listed on the U.S. National Register of Historic Places
- Michigan State Historic Site
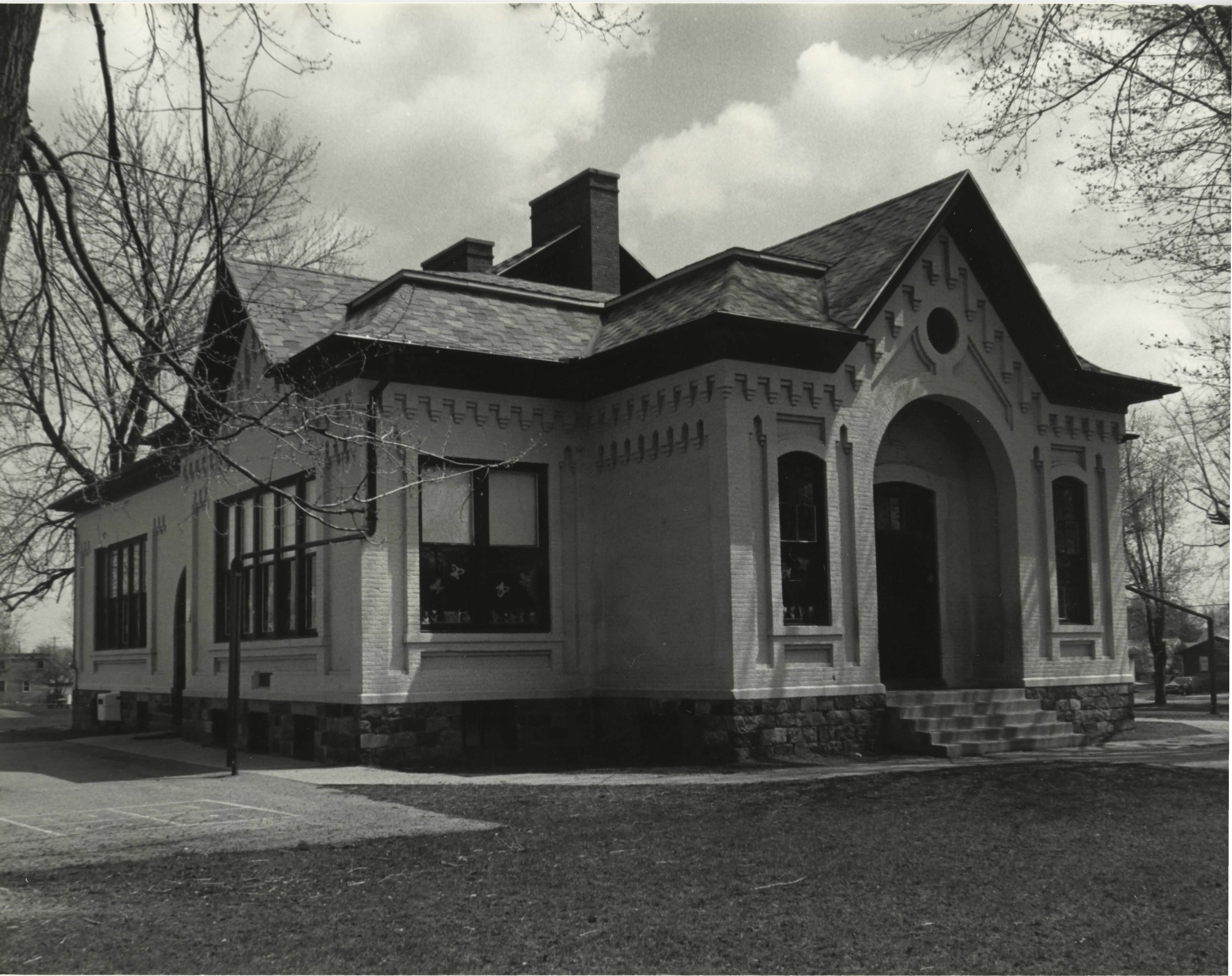
- East Ward School in 1979

- Location within Michigan Location within the United States
- Interactive map
- Location: 106 N. Traver St., St. Johns, Michigan
- Coordinates: 43°00′06″N 84°32′57″W
- Area: 4 acres (1.6 ha)
- Built: 1876
- Architect: Oliver Hidden
- Demolished: 2003
- NRHP reference No.: 80001850

Significant dates
- Added to NRHP: May 12, 1980
- Designated MSHS: February 27, 1980
- Removed from NRHP: April 27, 2026

The East Ward School, also known as the Teresa Merrill School, was an educational building located at 106 North Traver Street in St. Johns, Michigan. It was designated a Michigan State Historic Site and listed on the National Register of Historic Places in 1980. It was unusual for its size and its elaborate brickwork. The school building has been replaced with a housing development and a preschool in 2003, and removed from the National Register in 2026..

== History ==
The East Ward School was constructed in 1876 from plans by Bay City architect Oliver Hidden. An addition was constructed in 1906. In 1976, the school was renamed the Theresa Merrill School in honor of a former principal, and was used for adult education classes. It was replaced with a housing development and a preschool in 2003.

== Description ==
The East Ward School was a single-story brick structure consisting of two sections: the original building, constructed in 1876, and a 1906 addition. The 1876 building was a rectangular structure, with a low hip roof with a gable at each end. A projecting entrance had an arced, recessed porch topped with another gable. The brickwork contained an elaborate decorative scheme with corbelled and paneled bricks. There were two rooms in the interior.

The 1906 addition was approximately the same size as the earlier section, and also contained two rooms. It had a high hip roof and brickwork that matched that of the earlier section.

A bell tower which was originally above the front entrance to the older section had been removed. In addition, the original narrow windows of the older section had been removed and replaced with wider windows which matched the newer section.

== Gallery ==
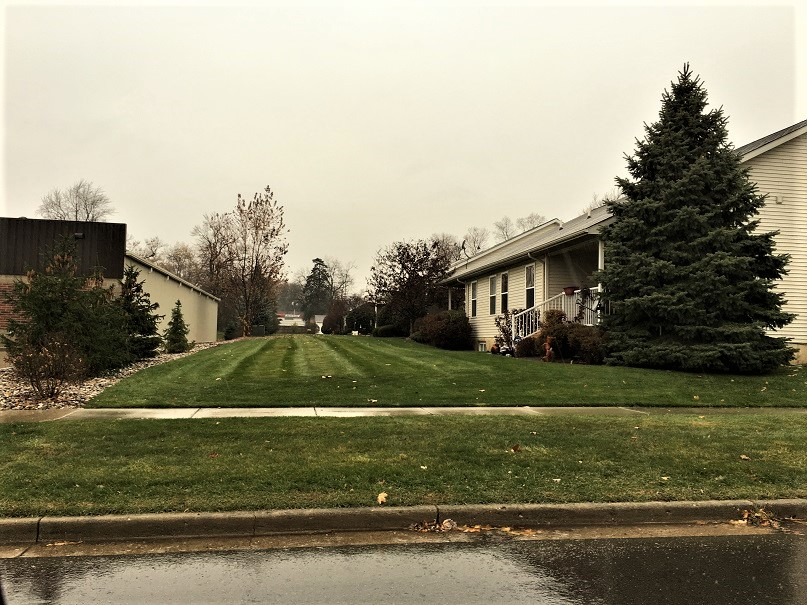
Former site of East Ward School

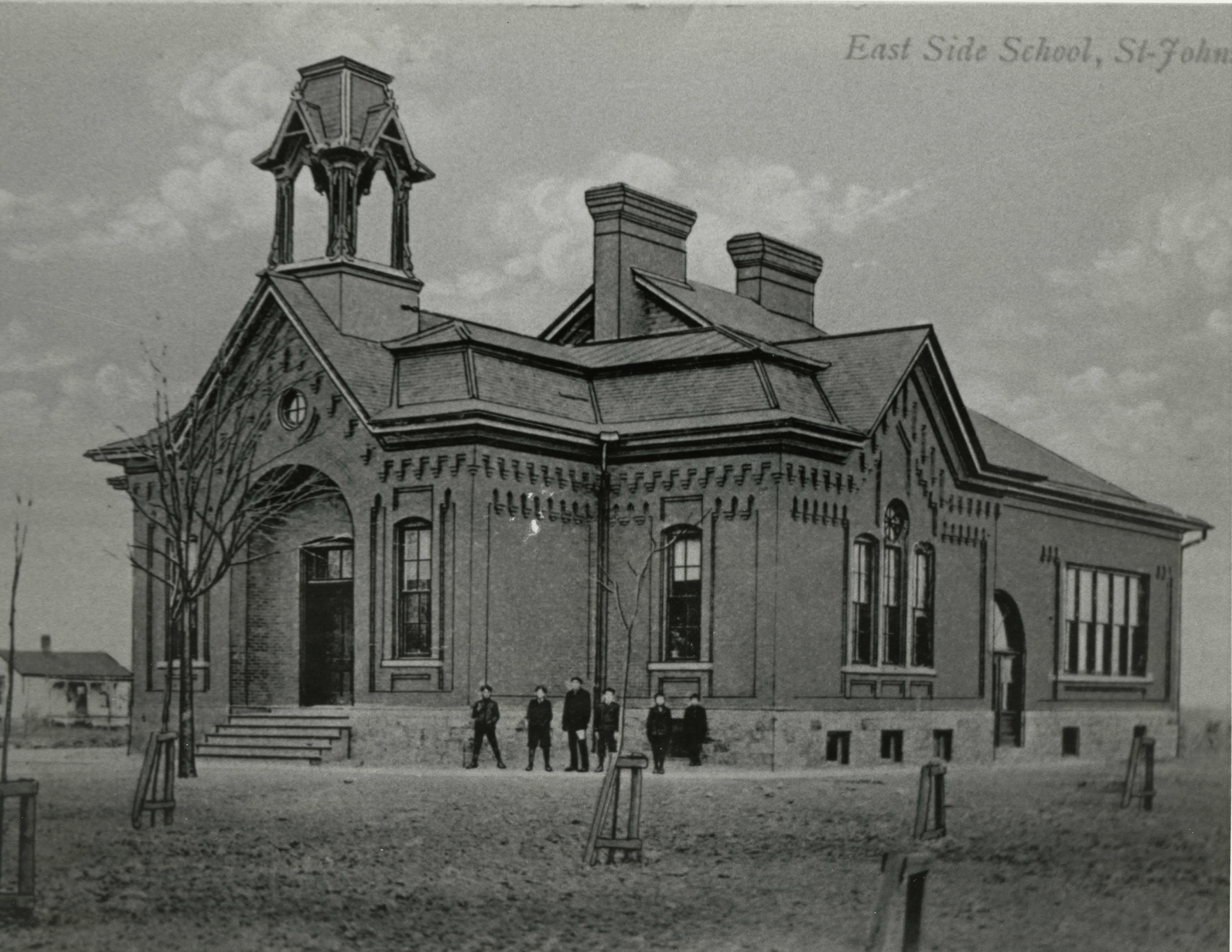
East Ward School in 1910
