= Giles J. Gibbs Building =

- Gibbs, Giles J., Building--Sugar Bowl
- U.S. National Register of Historic Places
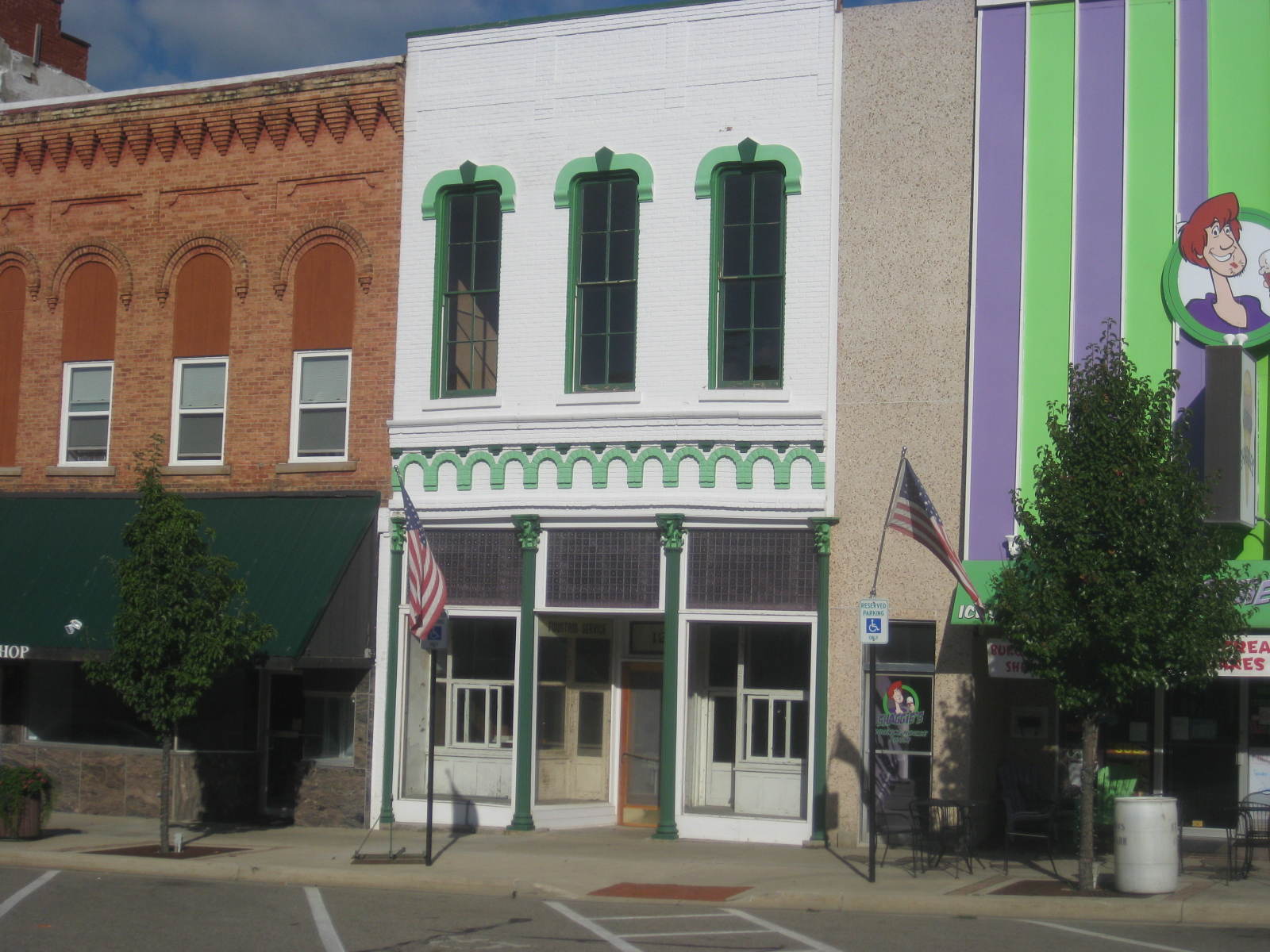

- Location within Michigan Location within the United States
- Interactive map
- Location: 112 N. Clinton Ave., St. Johns, Michigan
- Coordinates: 43°0′7″N 84°33′30″W
- Area: less than one acre
- Built: 1867
- Architectural style: Italianate
- NRHP reference No.: 00000223
- Added to NRHP: March 15, 2000

The Giles J. Gibbs Building, also known as the Sugar Bowl, is a commercial building located at 12 North Clinton Avenue in St. Johns, Michigan. It was listed on the National Register of Historic Places in 2000.

== History ==
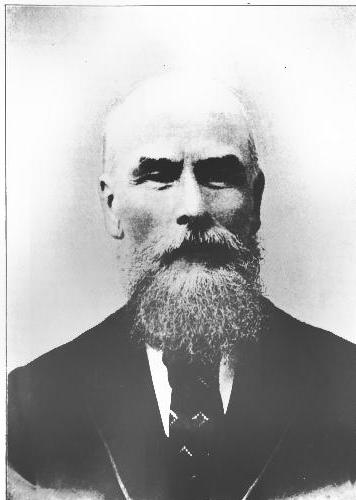
Giles J Gibbs

Giles J. Gibbs was born in Jefferson County, New York in 1827, the son of David and Hannah Gibbs. His parents died when Gibbs was eight years old, and he worked as a farm hand while growing up. He eventually attended Spring Arbor College and bought a farm in Jackson County, Michigan. He later worked as a drayer, then as a grocer and a representative of a drug firm. In 1857, he arrived in St. Johns and purchased a lot, then built a grocery store. He sold the business, engaged in real estate speculation, and built a home.

In 1867, Gibbs constructed this building on Clinton Avenue, and started another grocery store. In 1882, he sold the business to Olney P. DeWitt and retired. Giles J. Gibbs died in 1913.

DeWitt continued in the grocery business until at least 1906. At about the same time, Christ Cooles opened a confectionery shop in the building. In 1916, the business was purchased by Greek immigrant Nick Pappas. Pappas had arrived in the United States in 1905, and worked at two other candy shops in Michigan to save enough money to buy the Sugar Bowl.

Pappas owned and operated the Sugar Bowl until his death in 1947. Nick Pappas's wife Virginia and son George then operated the Sugar Bowl until it closed in 1970.

== Description ==
The Giles J. Gibbs Building is a two-story brick commercial structure with a fieldstone foundation, measuring approximately 21 feet wide by 110 feet long. A single-story addition extends to the rear. On the front, the first story contains a recessed central flanked by large plate-glass windows which are framed by matching cast iron and wooden Corinthian columns. A transom above the storefront contains small square glass tiles. The second floor contains three double-hung windows with rounded tops.

The interior remains set up as a confectionery and soda fountain. The first floor contains retail space in the front with a storage/work area at the rear. The retail space has a stamped metal ceiling and linoleum over wood floor. Along one wall is an elaborate mirrored back-bar manufactured by the Liquid Carbonic Company in the early 1900s, containing mahogany cabinets and stained glass panels. In front of this is a marble soda fountain manufactured by the Knight Soda Fountain Company of Chicago around the same time. A service counter constructed of white glass with a black etched-glass countertop is in front of this. Cast iron stools line the counter. Opposite this is another wooden back-bar with leaded glass doors and two early display cases. The back-bar has an etched black glass countertop matching the service counter. Eight paneled wooden booths sit farther inward from the back-bars.

The second floor of the building consists of ten small rooms, and once served as living quarters. The floor is reached by stairs from the front facade, which are shared with the next-door building, and from the rear. The entire second floor has a beaded pine ceiling and wooden floors.
