= St. Johns, Michigan =

- City
- City of St. Johns
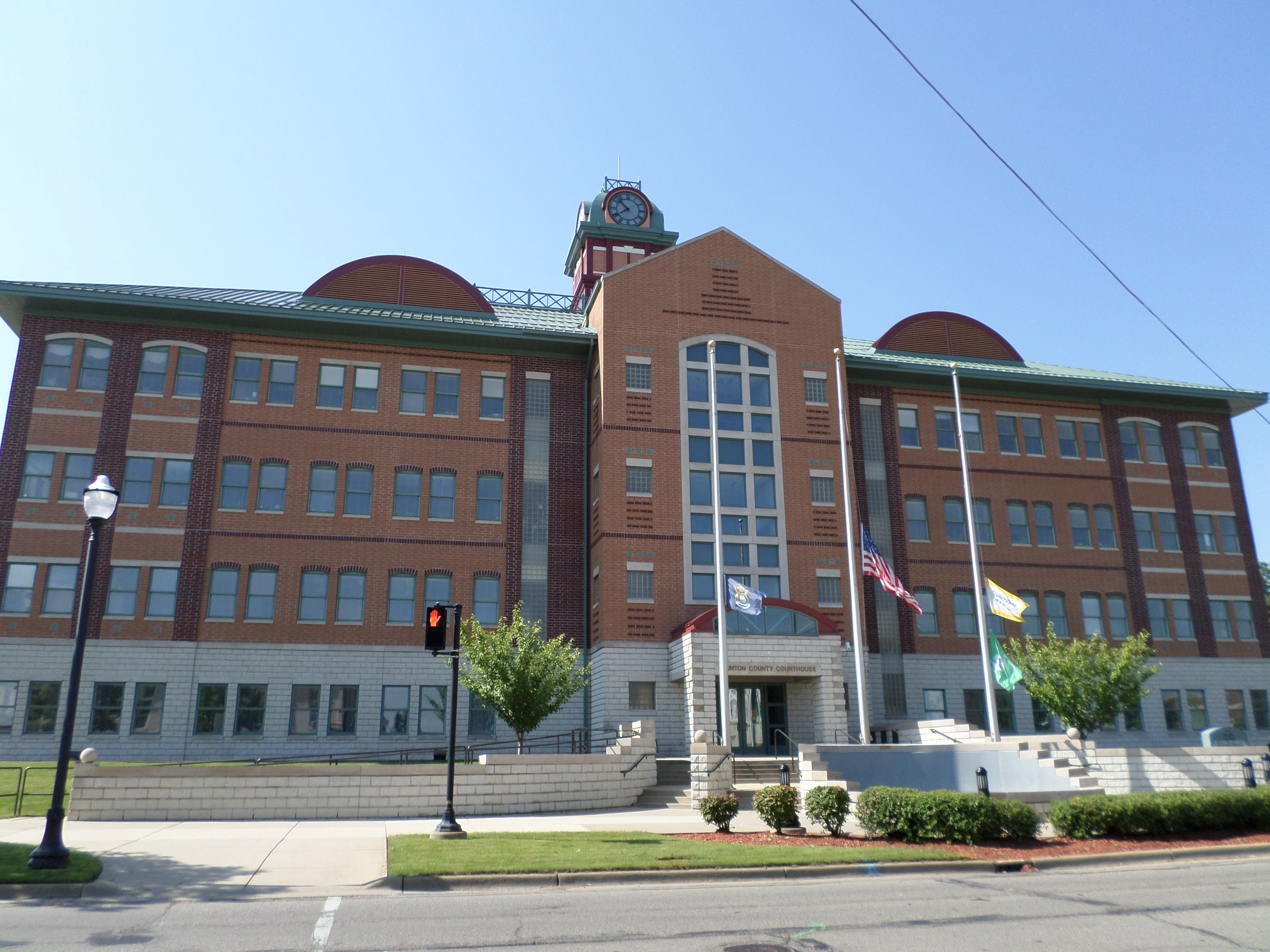
- Clinton County Courthouse in downtown St. Johns
- Nicknames: "S.J.", "Mint City (U.S.A.)", "Mint Capital of the World"
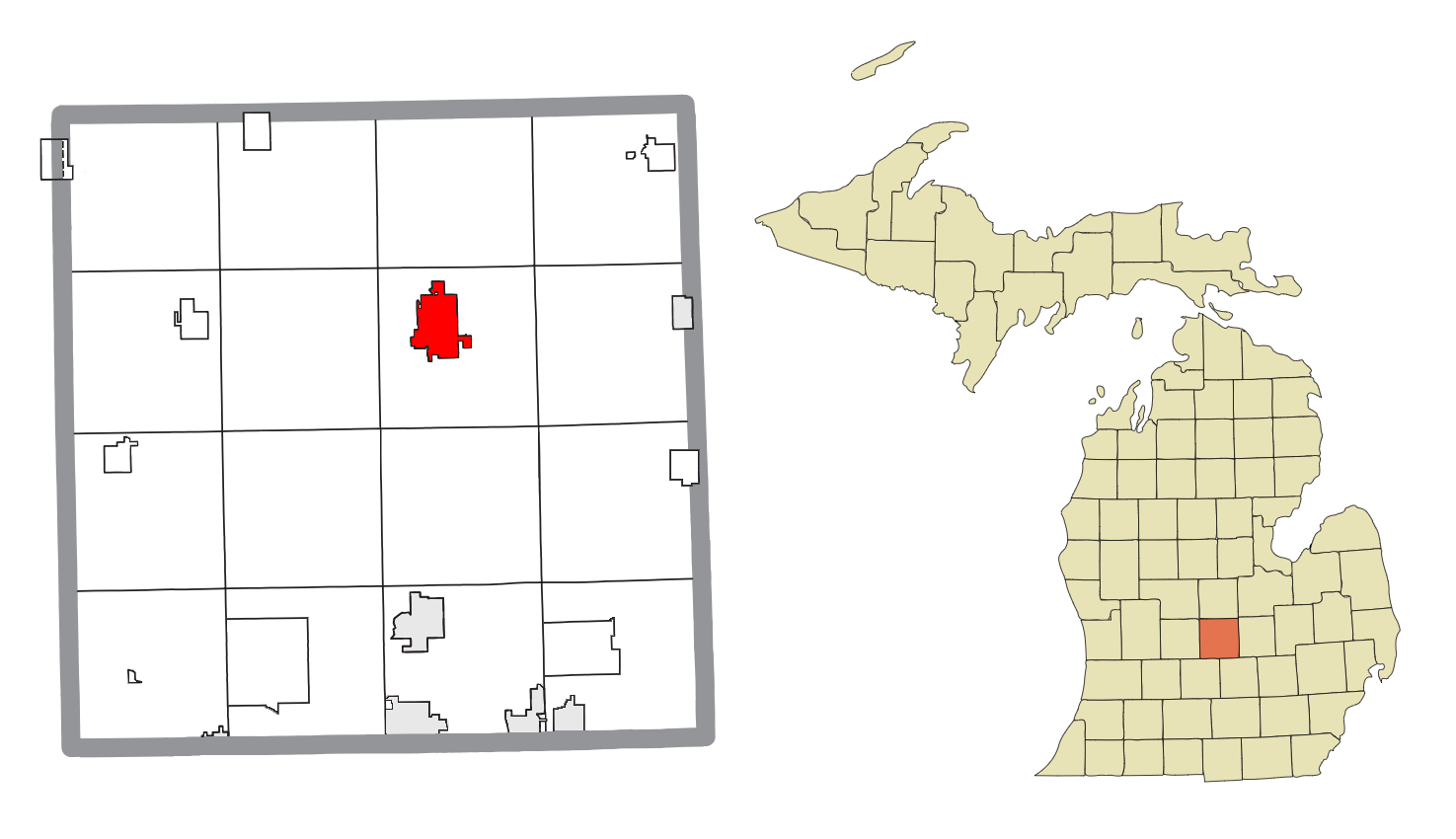
- Location within Clinton County

- Location within the state of Michigan Location within the United States
- Coordinates: 43°00′02″N 84°33′20″W
- Country: United States
- State: Michigan
- County: Clinton
- Settled: 1854
- Incorporated: 1904

Government
  - Type: Commission–manager
  - Mayor: Scott Dzurka
  - Manager: Chad Gamble

Area
  - Total: 4.21 sq mi (10.91 km^{2})
  - Land: 4.21 sq mi (10.91 km^{2})
  - Water: 0 sq mi (0.00 km^{2})
- Elevation: 791 ft (241 m)

Population (2020)
  - Total: 7,698
  - Density: 1,827.1/sq mi (705.45/km^{2})
- Time zone: UTC-5 (Eastern (EST))
  - Summer (DST): UTC-4 (EDT)
- ZIP code(s): 48879
- Area code: 989 517
- FIPS code: 26-70940
- GNIS feature ID: 1627030
- Website: Official website

St. Johns or Saint Johns is the largest city in and the county seat of Clinton County in the U.S. state of Michigan. The population was 7,698 at the 2020 census.

St. Johns is located in the north of Clinton County, surrounded by Bingham Township (although the two are administered independently). St. Johns is about 18 miles (29 km) north of Lansing, Michigan's capital city, and is part of the Lansing–East Lansing metropolitan area. St. Johns has been nicknamed the "Mint Capital of the World".

== History ==
St. Johns was conceived as a station for the Detroit and Milwaukee Railway in late 1853. The location lie in a forest in Bingham Township, and the site was cleared and settled by the middle of 1854. The settlement was formally incorporated as a village within the township on October 15, 1857. The village incorporated as a city in 1904.

The settlement was named after Michigan Auditor-General John Swegles, who was part of the party sent to scout a site for the station.

== Geography ==
According to the United States Census Bureau, the city has a total area of 3.87 square miles (10.02 km^{2}), all of it land. The city is situated in Bingham Township, but is administratively autonomous.

== Demographics ==
Historical population
Census	Pop.	Note	%±
1880	2,370		—
1890	3,127		31.9%
1900	3,388		8.3%
1910	3,154		−6.9%
1920	3,925		24.4%
1930	3,929		0.1%
1940	4,422		12.5%
1950	4,954		12.0%
1960	5,629		13.6%
1970	6,672		18.5%
1980	7,376		10.6%
1990	7,284		−1.2%
2000	7,458		2.4%
2010	7,865		5.5%
2020	7,698		−2.1%
U.S. Decennial Census

=== 2020 census ===
As of the 2020 census, St. Johns had a population of 7,698. The median age was 40.3 years. 22.2% of residents were under the age of 18 and 20.3% of residents were 65 years of age or older. For every 100 females there were 91.3 males, and for every 100 females age 18 and over there were 86.8 males age 18 and over.

100.0% of residents lived in urban areas, while 0.0% lived in rural areas.

There were 3,306 households in St. Johns, of which 28.9% had children under the age of 18 living in them. Of all households, 41.0% were married-couple households, 18.0% were households with a male householder and no spouse or partner present, and 33.2% were households with a female householder and no spouse or partner present. About 34.3% of all households were made up of individuals and 15.2% had someone living alone who was 65 years of age or older.

There were 3,545 housing units, of which 6.7% were vacant. The homeowner vacancy rate was 2.1% and the rental vacancy rate was 7.1%.

Racial composition as of the 2020 census
Race	Number	Percent
White	6,997	90.9%
Black or African American	58	0.8%
American Indian and Alaska Native	42	0.5%
Asian	45	0.6%
Native Hawaiian and Other Pacific Islander	2	0.0%
Some other race	101	1.3%
Two or more races	453	5.9%
Hispanic or Latino (of any race)	378	4.9%

=== 2010 census ===
As of the census of 2010, there were 7,865 people, 3,147 households, and 2,011 families residing in the city. The population density was 2,032.3 inhabitants per square mile (784.7/km^{2}). There were 3,451 housing units at an average density of 891.7 per square mile (344.3/km^{2}). The racial makeup of the city was 93.9% White, 1.4% African American, 0.6% Native American, 0.5% Asian, 0.1% Pacific Islander, 1.2% from other races, and 2.3% from two or more races. Hispanic or Latino of any race were 4.6% of the population.

There were 3,147 households, of which 32.8% had children under the age of 18 living with them, 45.2% were married couples living together, 14.0% had a female householder with no husband present, 4.7% had a male householder with no wife present, and 36.1% were non-families. 30.5% of all households were made up of individuals, and 13% had someone living alone who was 65 years of age or older. The average household size was 2.38 and the average family size was 2.95.

The median age in the city is 37.2. 25.4% of residents were under the age of 18; 8.5% were between the ages of 18 and 24; 26.5% were from 25 to 44; 24.1% were from 45 to 64; and 15.6% were 65 years of age or older. The gender makeup of the city was 47.7% male and 52.3% female.

== Culture ==
The Wilson Center Auditorium on Cass Street puts on rock concerts and theatrical productions throughout the year. To date, they have brought in acts such as David Dondero, Hailey Wojcik, and Doug Mains and the City Folk.

=== Mint production ===
Near the turn of the century, high demand for mint oil in medicines and candy from companies like Wrigley caused a surge in demand for mint farming. The rich, organic, muck soil of Clinton County makes the area around St. Johns particularly well-suited for mint farming. As a result, many mint farmers cultivated mint. The Crosby Mint Farm, established by J.E. Crosby in 1912, claims to be the oldest continuously family-operated mint farm in the United States.

Today Clinton County ranks first in Michigan in regards to total mint production. St. Johns is known as the Mint City and has been called "The Mint Capital of the World."

Each year since 1985, St. Johns celebrates its mint farming heritage with the St. Johns Mint Festival. The festival typically takes place on the second weekend in August.

== Transportation ==
=== Highways ===
- US 127 connects north to Mt. Pleasant, and Grayling. Southward, it passes through Lansing and Jackson en route to Ohio. It provides a direct connection to I-69 and I-96.
- Bus. US 127 is a business loop traveling through the city.
- M-21 is an east-west highway passing through the city, connecting to Grand Rapids, approximately 66 miles (106 km) to the west, and Flint, about 45 miles (72 km) to the east.

=== Airports ===
- Scheduled passenger air carrier flights are available from Capital Region International Airport, in south-central Clinton County.

== Notable people ==
- Robert Asprin, science fiction and fantasy author
- Roy Beechler, football player and coach
- Leo Burnett, advertising executive
- Myrtelle Canavan, pathologist, discovered Canavan Disease
- Voltairine de Cleyre, anarchist writer and feminist
- Eric Esch, commonly referred to as Butterbean, former fighter
- The Houghton brothers, creators of Big City Greens
- Andrew Kehoe, perpetrator of the Bath School Disaster
- Philip Orin Parmelee, aviator
- Oliver L. Spaulding, Civil War general in the 23rd Michigan Volunteer Infantry Regiment, politician, and regent of the University of Michigan
- Oliver Lyman Spaulding, U.S. Army brigadier general
- Lee Upton, poet, fiction writer, and literary critic
- Lola Carrier Worrell, composer

== Places of interest ==
- Paine-Gillam-Scott Museum – Home of the Clinton County Historical Society. Built in 1858, the house holds the distinction of being the oldest brick residence in the city of St. Johns.
- Clinton Northern Railway Museum - Located in the former Grand Trunk Depot, the museum focuses on railroad history and its impact on small-town America. The museum features several restored railway cars.
- IQhub at Agroliquid – Center for agricultural history, innovation and exploration. The IQhub is located inside AgroLiquid's world headquarters in St. Johns, Michigan. The 9,500 square foot agriculture education destination is home to exhibits chronicling the advancement of agriculture, from before the Europeans arrived in the Americas through the present day.

== Registered Historic Buildings in St. Johns ==
Name	Image	Location	Michigan State Historic Site	Michigan Historical Marker	National Register of Historic Places	Description
Coleman's Hotel		Southeast corner of US-127 and French Rd.	November 21, 1975	N/A	N/A	
Roswell C. Dexter House		200 S. Church St.	November 1, 1988	N/A	N/A	
East Ward School †		106 N. Traver St.	February 27, 1980	N/A	May 12, 1980	The East Ward School was constructed in 1876 from plans by Bay City architect Oliver Hidden. It was unusual for its size and its elaborate brickwork. In 1976 the school was named Teresa Merrill School in honor of longtime local educator Teresa A. Merrill. The school building has been replaced with a housing development and a preschool.
Paine-Gillam-Scott House		106 Maple St.	January 18, 1980	1988	N/A	Lured by the railroad, John W. Paine (1821–1870) moved from the nearby Rochester Colony to St. Johns. In 1860 he built the town's first brick store and this house. The office was later added to this site. Dr. Samuel Gillam (1845–1908) remodeled the house in 1883. In 1904 he was joined by Dr. Walter M. Scott (1875–1934), who practiced here until his death. The Clinton County Historical Society restored the house in 1978 and the office in 1986.
Henry M. Perrin-Dr. Henry Palmer House		903 N. Clinton Ave.	February 25, 1988	N/A	N/A	
St. John's Church		400 E. Walker St.	February 23, 1981	1990	N/A	The congregation first organized in 1858, and built their first church in 1867. Shortly after the close of Easter evening services in 1893 the church burned. The congregation celebrated the first service in the current church on Easter Sunday 1894.
St. Johns Union School †		205 West Baldwin St.	February 27, 1980	N/A	May 15, 1980	The Union School was a state-of-the-art school when it was built in 1885. It served as a school for the St. Johns district until 1986. The building has been replaced with a housing development.
Steel Hotel †		West side of N. Clinton Ave.	February 11, 1972	N/A	N/A	Built by prominent local businessman Robert M. Steel in 1887. At the time the hotel was built, and for many years later, the building was considered one of the finest hotels in the state. The building famously burned down in 1975.
Giles J. Gibbs Building		12 N. Clinton Ave.	N/A	N/A	March 15, 2000	Constructed in 1867, this building was originally home to a grocer. It is most notable for being home to the former Sugar Bowl Restaurant. The interior remains set up as a confectionery and soda fountain to this day.

Sites marked with a dagger (†) have been demolished.

== Climate ==
This climatic region is typified by large seasonal temperature differences, with warm to hot (and often humid) summers and cold (sometimes severely cold) winters. According to the Köppen Climate Classification system, St. Johns has a humid continental climate, abbreviated "Dfb" on climate maps.

Climate data for St. Johns, Michigan (1991–2020 normals, extremes 1894–2016)
Month	Jan	Feb	Mar	Apr	May	Jun	Jul	Aug	Sep	Oct	Nov	Dec	Year
Record high °F (°C)	64 (18)	69 (21)	86 (30)	89 (32)	95 (35)	100 (38)	102 (39)	102 (39)	99 (37)	89 (32)	79 (26)	69 (21)	102 (39)
Mean daily maximum °F (°C)	30.6 (−0.8)	33.0 (0.6)	43.7 (6.5)	56.9 (13.8)	69.3 (20.7)	78.9 (26.1)	83.2 (28.4)	81.3 (27.4)	74.8 (23.8)	61.7 (16.5)	47.3 (8.5)	36.0 (2.2)	58.1 (14.5)
Daily mean °F (°C)	24.2 (−4.3)	25.8 (−3.4)	34.9 (1.6)	46.6 (8.1)	58.8 (14.9)	68.8 (20.4)	72.8 (22.7)	71.0 (21.7)	63.9 (17.7)	52.2 (11.2)	40.0 (4.4)	30.0 (−1.1)	49.1 (9.5)
Mean daily minimum °F (°C)	17.7 (−7.9)	18.6 (−7.4)	26.1 (−3.3)	36.4 (2.4)	48.2 (9.0)	58.7 (14.8)	62.3 (16.8)	60.7 (15.9)	53.1 (11.7)	42.6 (5.9)	32.8 (0.4)	24.1 (−4.4)	40.1 (4.5)
Record low °F (°C)	−25 (−32)	−22 (−30)	−14 (−26)	5 (−15)	15 (−9)	29 (−2)	39 (4)	38 (3)	27 (−3)	14 (−10)	−5 (−21)	−14 (−26)	−25 (−32)
Average precipitation inches (mm)	2.07 (53)	1.80 (46)	1.93 (49)	3.58 (91)	3.83 (97)	3.35 (85)	3.20 (81)	3.46 (88)	2.87 (73)	3.25 (83)	2.84 (72)	1.82 (46)	34.00 (864)
Average precipitation days (≥ 0.01 in)	12.5	9.8	10.3	11.9	12.1	10.1	9.4	10.2	9.6	11.3	11.0	10.8	129.0
Source: NOAA

== Crime rate ==
Crime in St. Johns is significantly lower when compared to the national average, and average-to-high when compared to surrounding cities.

Violent Crime Rate in 2012 (higher number means more dangerous)

- U.S. Average: 214
- St. Johns: 95.5
- Laingsburg: 279.8
- Ovid: 58.9
- Elsie: 79.6
- Dewitt: N/A
- Lansing: 422.7

Reported Incidents from 2001–2012 in St. Johns, MI:

- Rape: 35
- Arson: 9
- Motor vehicle theft: 70
- Assault: 55
- Burglaries : 366

== See also ==
- National Register of Historic Places listings in Clinton County, Michigan
- List of Michigan State Historic Sites in Clinton County
