= Ovid, Michigan =

- City
- City of Ovid
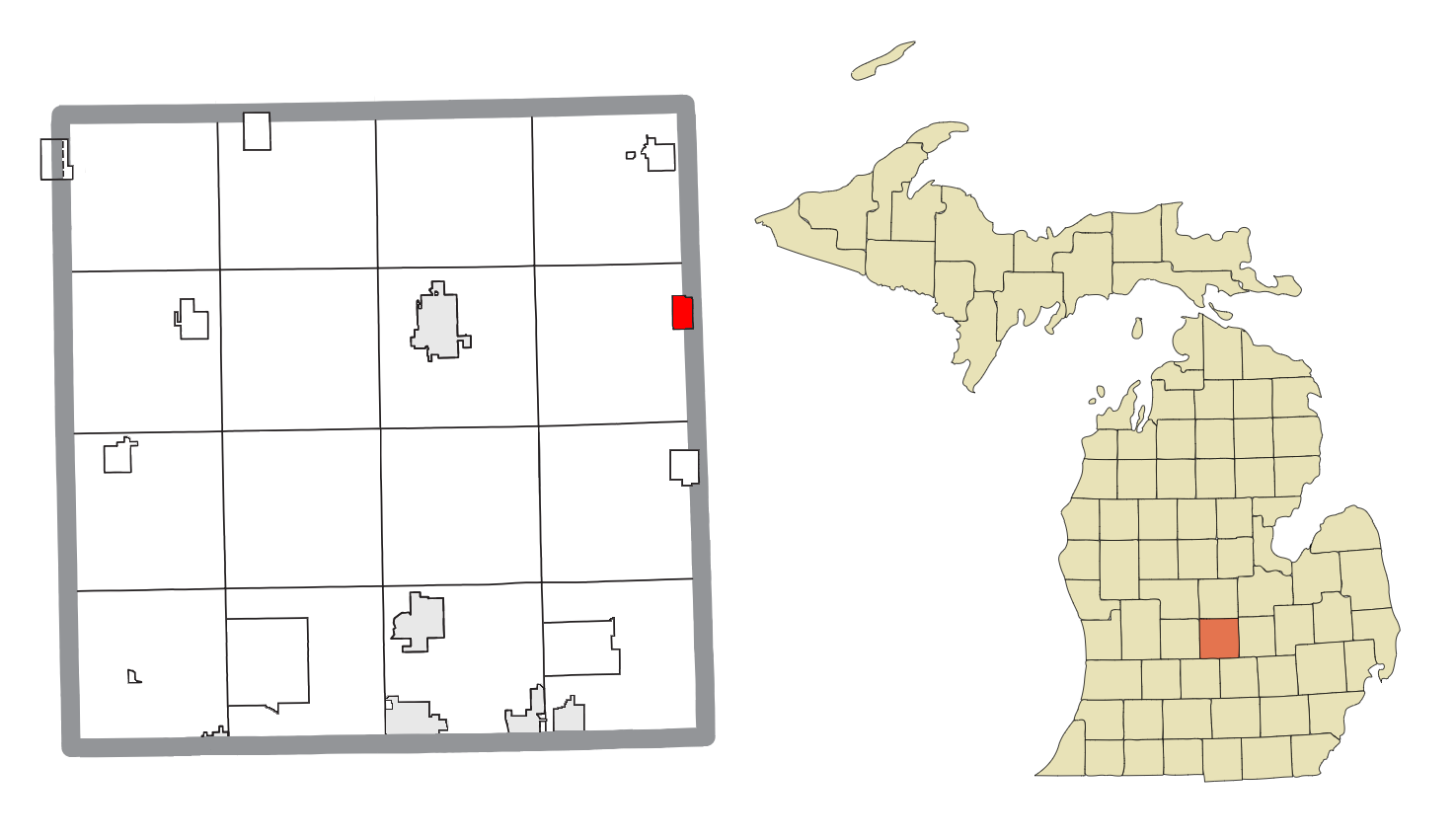
- Location within Clinton County

- Location within the state of Michigan Location within the United States
- Coordinates: 43°00′11″N 84°22′27″W
- Country: United States
- State: Michigan
- Counties: Clinton and Shiawassee
- Founded: 1867
- Incorporated: 1869 (village); 2015 (city)

Government
  - Type: Mayor–council
  - Mayor: Mary Perrien
  - Clerk: Josefina Medina

Area
  - Total: 1.04 sq mi (2.70 km^{2})
  - Land: 1.01 sq mi (2.62 km^{2})
  - Water: 0.031 sq mi (0.08 km^{2})
- Elevation: 725 ft (221 m)

Population (2020)
  - Total: 1,481
  - Density: 1,466.6/sq mi (566.24/km^{2})
- Time zone: UTC-5 (Eastern (EST))
  - Summer (DST): UTC-4 (EDT)
- ZIP code(s): 48866
- Area code: 989
- FIPS code: 26-61860
- GNIS feature ID: 2399601
- Website: Official website

Ovid is a city in the U.S. state of Michigan. Nearly all of the city is located within Clinton County with only a very small portion extending east into Shiawassee County. The population was 1,481 at the 2020 census.

The city is located along M-21, about 9 miles (14 km) east of St. Johns and about 10 miles (16 km) west of Owosso. Ovid incorporated as a village in 1867 and as a city in 2015.

== Etymology ==
Ovid was named after Ovid, New York, the hometown of a settler named William Swarthout who migrated here in the mid-1800s.

== Geography ==
According to the United States Census Bureau, the city has a total area of 0.92 square miles (2.38 km^{2}), all land.

The city is located in both Clinton County to the west and Shiawassee County to the east. The vast majority of the city's boundaries are within Clinton County. Only a very small portion extends east of Meridian Street, which serves as the county line. The 2010 census lists all 0.92 square miles (2.38 km^{2}) of Ovid within Clinton County and no land area within Shiawassee County. However, the 2010 census listed six residents out of 1,603 (0.37%) as being in Shiawassee County.

== Demographics ==
Historical population
Census	Pop.	Note	%±
1880	1,479		—
1890	1,423		−3.8%
1900	1,293		−9.1%
1910	1,078		−16.6%
1920	1,067		−1.0%
1930	1,131		6.0%
1940	1,248		10.3%
1950	1,410		13.0%
1960	1,505		6.7%
1970	1,650		9.6%
1980	1,712		3.8%
1990	1,442		−15.8%
2000	1,514		5.0%
2010	1,603		5.9%
2020	1,481		−7.6%
U.S. Decennial Census

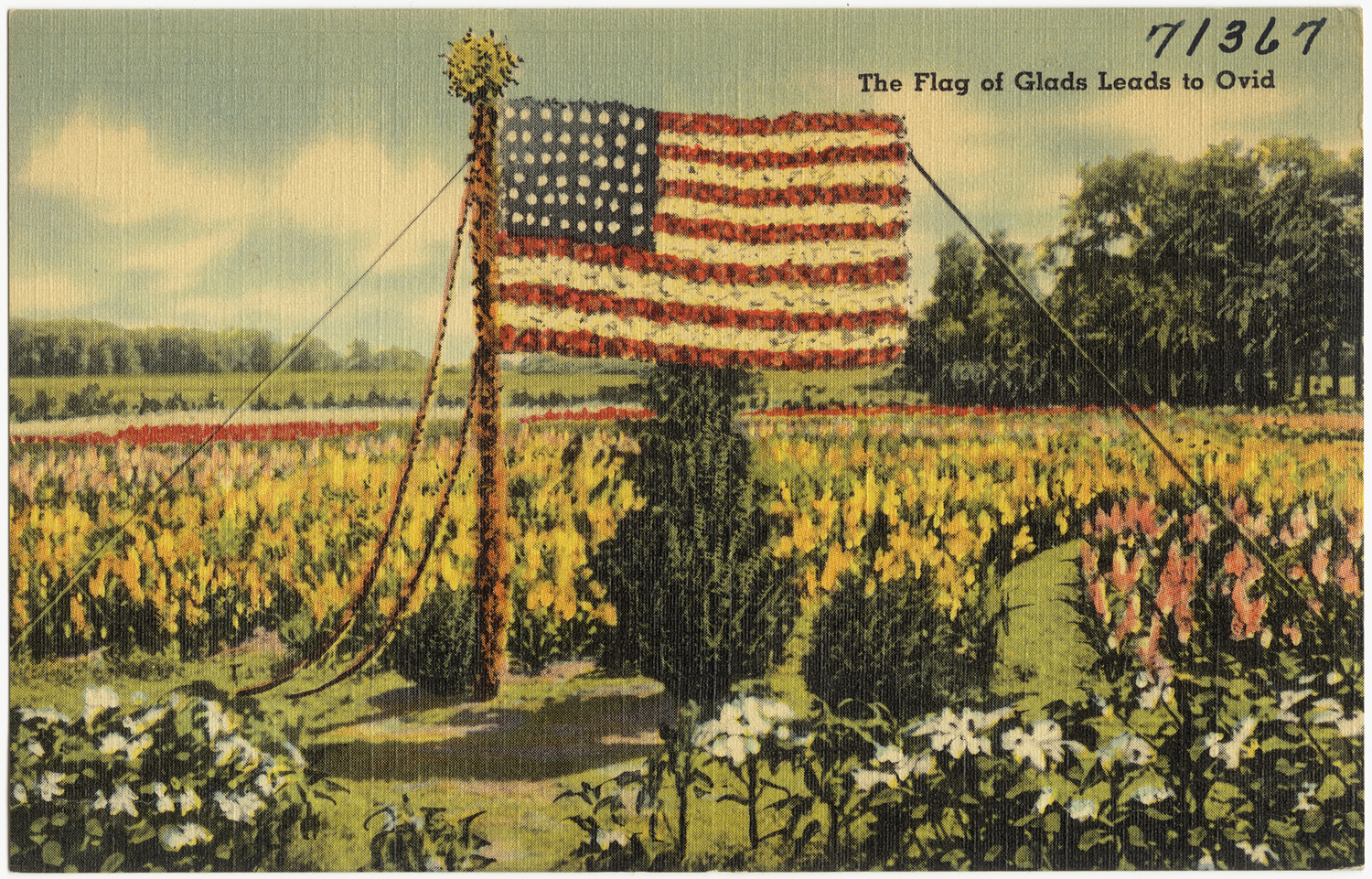
Postcard for the Third Annual Gladiolus Festival held at Ovid August 30–31, and September 1, 1941.

=== 2010 census ===
As of the census of 2010, there were 1,603 people, 578 households, and 398 families living in the city. The population density was 1,742.4 inhabitants per square mile (672.7/km^{2}). There were 618 housing units at an average density of 671.7 per square mile (259.3/km^{2}). The racial makeup of the city was 95.7% White, 0.4% African American, 0.3% Native American, 0.1% Asian, 0.1% Pacific Islander, 1.3% from other races, and 2.1% from two or more races. Hispanic or Latino of any race were 5.7% of the population.

There were 578 households, of which 41.3% had children under the age of 18 living with them, 43.1% were married couples living together, 18.9% had a female householder with no husband present, 6.9% had a male householder with no wife present, and 31.1% were non-families. 25.6% of all households were made up of individuals, and 10% had someone living alone who was 65 years of age or older. The average household size was 2.63 and the average family size was 3.12.

The median age in the city was 35 years. 29.4% of residents were under the age of 18; 7.7% were between the ages of 18 and 24; 27.2% were from 25 to 44; 20.5% were from 45 to 64; and 15.2% were 65 years of age or older. The gender makeup of the city was 45.6% male and 54.4% female.

=== 2000 census ===
As of the census of 2000, there were 1,514 people, 575 households, and 400 families living in the city. The population density was 1,634.9 inhabitants per square mile (631.2/km^{2}). There were 604 housing units at an average density of 652.2 per square mile (251.8/km^{2}). The racial makeup of the city was 96.30% White, 0.13% African American, 0.59% Native American, 0.13% Pacific Islander, 1.25% from other races, and 1.59% from two or more races. Hispanic or Latino of any race were 4.23% of the population.

There were 575 households, out of which 38.1% had children under the age of 18 living with them, 51.1% were married couples living together, 14.8% had a female householder with no husband present, and 30.3% were non-families. 23.5% of all households were made up of individuals, and 8.3% had someone living alone who was 65 years of age or older. The average household size was 2.63 and the average family size was 3.13.

In the city, the population was spread out, with 29.6% under the age of 18, 10.8% from 18 to 24, 29.6% from 25 to 44, 18.5% from 45 to 64, and 11.6% who were 65 years of age or older. The median age was 32 years. For every 100 females, there were 90.2 males. For every 100 females age 18 and over, there were 85.1 males.

The median income for a household in the city was $33,333, and the median income for a family was $38,235. Males had a median income of $33,438 versus $22,083 for females. The per capita income for the city was $15,324. About 10.5% of families and 11.5% of the population were below the poverty line, including 16.9% of those under age 18 and 3.1% of those age 65 or over.

== Education ==
Ovid and nearby Elsie are served by the Ovid-Elsie Area Schools, which operates two elementary schools, one middle school, and one high school.

- Leonard Elementary School, in Ovid (Also houses the Alternative High School)
- E.E. Knight Elementary School, in Elsie
- Ovid-Elsie Middle School, in Elsie
- Ovid-Elsie High School, in Elsie
- Former school: North Elementary School, in Ovid - building sold to convert into a senior and assisted living facility.

== Highways ==
- M-21

== Notable people ==
- Louis Filler, American social historian
