= Elsie, Michigan =

- Village
- Village of Elsie
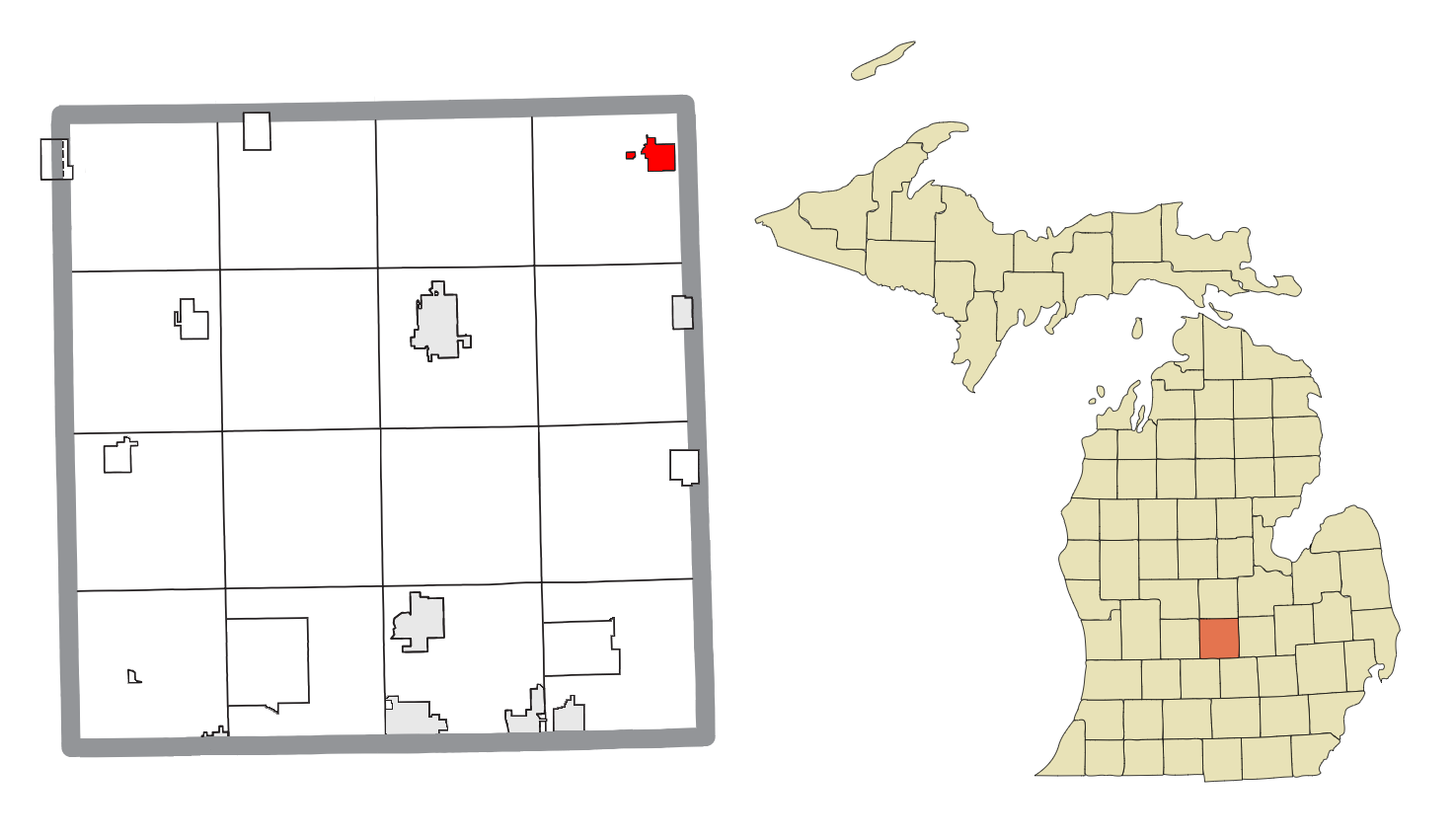
- Location within Clinton County

- Location within the state of Michigan Location within the United States
- Coordinates: 43°05′22″N 84°23′21″W
- Country: United States
- State: Michigan
- County: Clinton
- Township: Duplain
- Settled: 1857
- Incorporated: 1885

Government
  - Type: Village council
  - President: Jason Freeman
  - Manager: Destinee Bryce (Interim)

Area
  - Total: 1.18 sq mi (3.05 km^{2})
  - Land: 1.14 sq mi (2.96 km^{2})
  - Water: 0.035 sq mi (0.09 km^{2})
- Elevation: 732 ft (223 m)

Population (2020)
  - Total: 930
  - Density: 814.5/sq mi (314.49/km^{2})
- Time zone: UTC-5 (Eastern (EST))
  - Summer (DST): UTC-4 (EDT)
- ZIP code(s): 48831
- Area code: 989
- FIPS code: 26-25780
- GNIS feature ID: 2398819
- Website: Official website

Elsie is a village in Clinton County in the U.S. state of Michigan. As of the 2020 census, Elsie had a population of 930. The village consists of two noncontiguous portions within Duplain Township in the northeast portion of Clinton County—the smaller of which contains the village's Riverside Cemetery.

== History ==
Elsie was founded in 1857 and platted the same year. It was incorporated in 1885. Elsie is named for Miss Elsie Tillotson, the daughter of an early settler.

== Geography ==
According to the United States Census Bureau, the village has a total area of 1.20 square miles (3.11 km^{2}), of which 1.16 square miles (3.00 km^{2}) is land and 0.04 square miles (0.10 km^{2}) (3.33%) is water.

== Demographics ==
Historical population
Census	Pop.	Note	%±
1880	253		—
1890	396		56.5%
1900	576		45.5%
1910	592		2.8%
1920	680		14.9%
1930	664		−2.4%
1940	773		16.4%
1950	911		17.9%
1960	933		2.4%
1970	988		5.9%
1980	1,022		3.4%
1990	957		−6.4%
2000	1,055		10.2%
2010	966		−8.4%
2020	930		−3.7%
U.S. Decennial Census

=== 2010 census ===
As of the census of 2010, there were 966 people, 392 households, and 256 families living in the village. The population density was 832.8 inhabitants per square mile (321.5/km^{2}). There were 421 housing units at an average density of 362.9 per square mile (140.1/km^{2}). The racial makeup of the village was 97.3% White, 0.4% African American, 0.6% Native American, 0.1% Asian, 0.9% from other races, and 0.6% from two or more races. Hispanic or Latino of any race were 2.4% of the population.

There were 392 households, of which 35.5% had children under the age of 18 living with them, 52.0% were married couples living together, 11.0% had a female householder with no husband present, 2.3% had a male householder with no wife present, and 34.7% were non-families. 28.8% of all households were made up of individuals, and 13.1% had someone living alone who was 65 years of age or older. The average household size was 2.45 and the average family size was 3.01.

The median age in the village was 39.7 years. 25.5% of residents were under the age of 18; 7.9% were between the ages of 18 and 24; 24.3% were from 25 to 44; 26% were from 45 to 64; and 16.3% were 65 years of age or older. The gender makeup of the village was 48.7% male and 51.3% female.

=== 2000 census ===
As of the census of 2000, there were 1,055 people, 414 households, and 288 families living in the village. The population density was 861.9 inhabitants per square mile (332.8/km^{2}). There were 438 housing units at an average density of 357.8 per square mile (138.1/km^{2}). The racial makeup of the village was 97.82% White, 0.09% African American, 0.19% Native American, 0.09% Asian, 1.42% from other races, and 0.38% from two or more races. Hispanic or Latino of any race were 2.37% of the population.

There were 414 households, out of which 32.6% had children under the age of 18 living with them, 55.3% were married couples living together, 11.1% had a female householder with no husband present, and 30.4% were non-families. 26.6% of all households were made up of individuals, and 16.4% had someone living alone who was 65 years of age or older. The average household size was 2.53 and the average family size was 3.05.

In the village, the population was spread out, with 26.7% under the age of 18, 7.1% from 18 to 24, 26.1% from 25 to 44, 21.9% from 45 to 64, and 18.2% who were 65 years of age or older. The median age was 38 years. For every 100 females, there were 85.4 males. For every 100 females age 18 and over, there were 81.9 males.

The median income for a household in the village was $36,635, and the median income for a family was $43,182. Males had a median income of $35,875 versus $24,375 for females. The per capita income for the village was $15,809. About 8.0% of families and 11.6% of the population were below the poverty line, including 19.3% of those under age 18 and 9.5% of those age 65 or over.
