= Car bomb =

Improvised explosive device

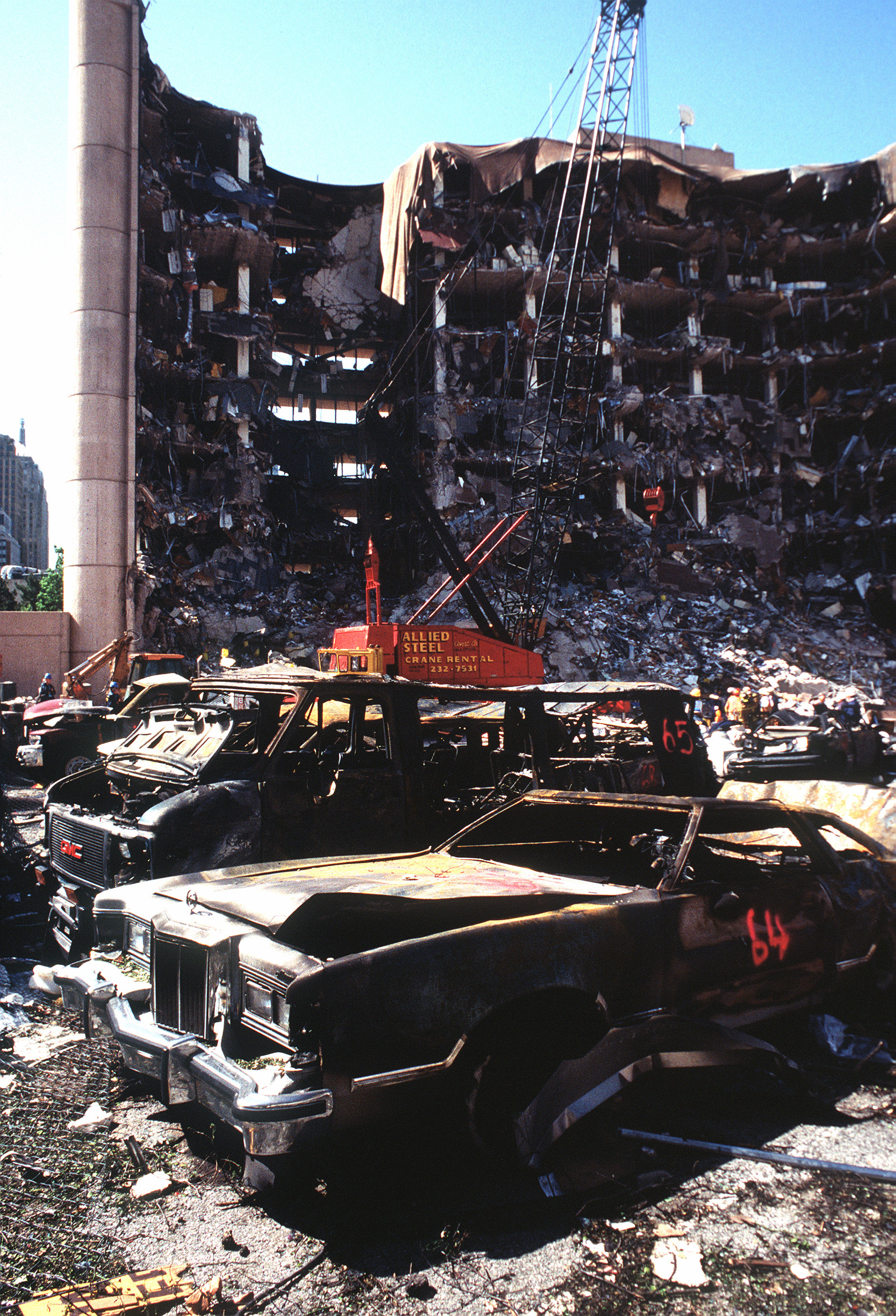
The result of the 1995 Oklahoma City truck bombing, which destroyed the Alfred P. Murrah Federal Building and killed 168 people

A car bomb, bus bomb, van bomb, lorry bomb, or truck bomb, also known as a vehicle-borne improvised explosive device (VBIED), is an improvised explosive device designed to be detonated in an automobile or other vehicles.

Car bombs can be roughly divided into two main categories: those used primarily to kill the occupants of the vehicle (often as an assassination) and those used as a means to kill, injure or damage people and buildings outside the vehicle. The latter type may be parked (the vehicle disguising the bomb and allowing the bomber to leave the area), or the vehicle might be used to deliver the bomb (often as part of a suicide bombing).

It is commonly used as a weapon of terrorism or guerrilla warfare to kill people near the blast site or to damage buildings or other property. Car bombs act as their own delivery mechanisms and can carry a relatively large amount of explosives without attracting suspicion. In larger vehicles and trucks, weights of around 5,000 pounds (2,300 kg) or more have been used, for example, in the Oklahoma City bombing. Car bombs are activated in a variety of ways, including opening the vehicle's doors, starting the engine, remote detonation, depressing the accelerator or brake pedals, or simply lighting a fuse or setting a timing device. The gasoline in the vehicle's fuel tank may make the explosion of the bomb more powerful by dispersing and igniting the fuel.

== History ==
Car bombs have been used for attacks motivated by a wide variety of grievances and ideologies, by people and groups from a wide variety of cultural and religious backgrounds.

Car bombs are preceded by the 16th century hellburners, explosive-laden ships which were used to deadly effect by the besieged Dutch forces in Antwerp against the besieging Spanish. Though using a less refined technology, the basic principle of the hellburner is similar to that of the car bomb.

The first car bomb may have been the one used for the assassination attempt on Ottoman Sultan Abdul Hamid II in 1905 in Istanbul by Armenian separatists in the command of Papken Siuni belonging to the Armenian Revolutionary Federation.

Car bombs were also preceded by animal bombs using horses and cows, then eventually emerging into car use. Prior to the 20th century, bombs planted in horse carts had been used in assassination plots, notably the unsuccessful "machine infernale" attempt to kill Napoleon on 24 December 1800. Mario Buda's improvised wagon used in the 1920 Wall Street bombing is considered a prototype of the car bomb.

The first reported car bombing was the Bath School bombings in Michigan, USA in 1927. Multiple separate explosions on the same day killed 45 people, including the bomber, and half of a school was destroyed. The bombings were all carried out by Andrew Kehoe, motivated by a personal grievance. His death was possibly an intentional suicide, but the cause of the explosion was a gun shot that might not have been intended to set off the load. The explosion itself did not seem to form part of a suicide attack on a specific planned target other than possibly himself and his truck. The explosives in his truck detonated when he saw two men nearby had a gun, after he set off multiple other bombs. The explosion may have been set off indirectly by him firing his own gun at the men. Most of the deaths were caused by the earlier bombs.

Some groups in Palestine have used both cars and donkeys. The Irgun, a Zionist militant group in British controlled Palestine, used donkeys in two attacks on Haifa vegetable market in 1939. The donkeys were loaded with explosives to attack the market, one attack killed 78 people, the other killed 21 people and wounded 24. The previous year the Irgun attacked the market with a car bomb, killing 35 Arab civilians and wounding 70. There are no clearly documented cases of the Irgun using car bombs in suicide attacks, but the Irgun and their extremist Lehi splinter group used suicide in other circumstances and are seen as the key developers of car bombs, that were later used by other groups in numerous suicide attacks. The Irgun were extremely influential.

While not an adaptation of a people-carrying vehicle, the WW2 German Goliath remote control mine shares many parallels with a vehicle-based IED. It approached a target (often a tank or another armoured vehicle) at speed before exploding, destroying itself and the target. It was armoured so that it could not be destroyed en route. However, it was not driven by a person, instead operated by remote control from a safe distance.

The first non-suicide car bombing "fully conceptualized as a weapon of urban warfare" came on 12 January 1947 when the Lehi (also known as Stern Gang), a Zionist paramilitary organization, bombed the Haifa police station. On 4 January 1948, a Lehi car bomb in Jaffa killed 70 Palestinian Arabs.

Car bombing was a significant part of the Provisional Irish Republican Army (PIRA) campaign during The Troubles in Northern Ireland. Dáithí Ó Conaill is credited with introducing the car bomb to Northern Ireland. Car bombs were also used by Ulster loyalist groups (for example, by the UVF during the Dublin and Monaghan bombings). PIRA Chief of Staff Seán Mac Stíofáin defines the car bomb as both a tactical and a strategic guerrilla warfare weapon. Strategically, it disrupts the ability of the enemy government to administer the country, and hits simultaneously at the core of its economic structure by means of massive destruction. From a tactical point of view, it ties down a large number of security forces and troops around the main urban areas of the region in conflict.

A notable suicide car bombing was the 1983 Beirut barracks bombing, when two simultaneous attacks killed 241 U.S. and 58 French peacekeepers. The perpetrator of these attacks has never been positively confirmed. In the Lebanese Civil War, an estimated 3,641 car bombs were detonated. The tactic was adopted by Palestinian militant groups such as the Qassam Brigades (militant wing of Hamas), Al-Aqsa Martyrs' Brigades (militant wing of Fatah, (Note: militant wing of Fatah at the time, but now independent) and Saraya al-Quds (militant wing of Palestinian Islamic Jihad). especially during the Second Intifada (2000–2005).

Mass-casualty suicide car bombings are predominantly associated with the Middle East, particularly in recent decades.

In the autumn of 2005, there were 140 car bombings happening per month.

== As a delivery system ==
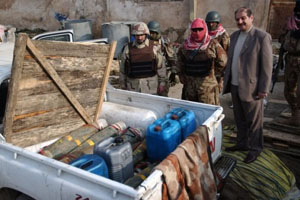
Car bomb in Iraq, made up of a number of artillery shells concealed in the back of a pickup truck

Car bombs are effective weapons as they are an easy way to transport a large number of explosives to a target. A car bomb also produces copious shrapnel, or flying debris, and secondary damage to bystanders and buildings. In recent years, car bombs have become widely used by suicide bombers.

=== Countermeasures ===
Defending against a car bomb involves keeping vehicles at a distance from vulnerable targets by using roadblocks and checkpoints, Jersey barriers, concrete blocks or bollards, metal barriers, or by hardening buildings to withstand explosions. The entrance to Downing Street in London has been closed since 1991 in reaction to the Provisional Irish Republican Army campaign, preventing the public from approaching Number 10. Where major public roads pass near buildings, road closures may be the only option (thus, for instance, in Washington, D.C. the portion of Pennsylvania Avenue immediately in front of the White House is closed to traffic). Historically these tactics have encouraged potential bombers to target "soft" or unprotected targets, such as markets.

=== Suicide usage ===
In the Iraqi and Syrian Civil War, the car bomb concept was modified so that it could be driven and detonated by a driver but armoured to withstand incoming fire. The vehicle would be driven to its target area, in a similar fashion to a kamikaze plane of WW2. These were known by the acronym SVBIED (from Suicide Vehicle Borne Improvised Explosive Device) or VBIEDs. Ordinary civilian cars were outfitted with armour plating intended to protect the VBIED as it approached its target. Such SVBIEDs were driven into enemy troop areas or incoming enemy columns. Most often, the SVBIEDs were used by ISIL against Government forces, but also used by Syrian rebels (FSA and allied militias, especially the Al-Nusra Front) against government troops.

The vehicles have become more sophisticated, with armour plating on the vehicle, protected vision slits, armour plating over the wheels so they would withstand being shot at and occasionally additional metal grating over the front of the vehicle designed to crush or destroy incoming shaped charges such as those used on rocket propelled grenades.

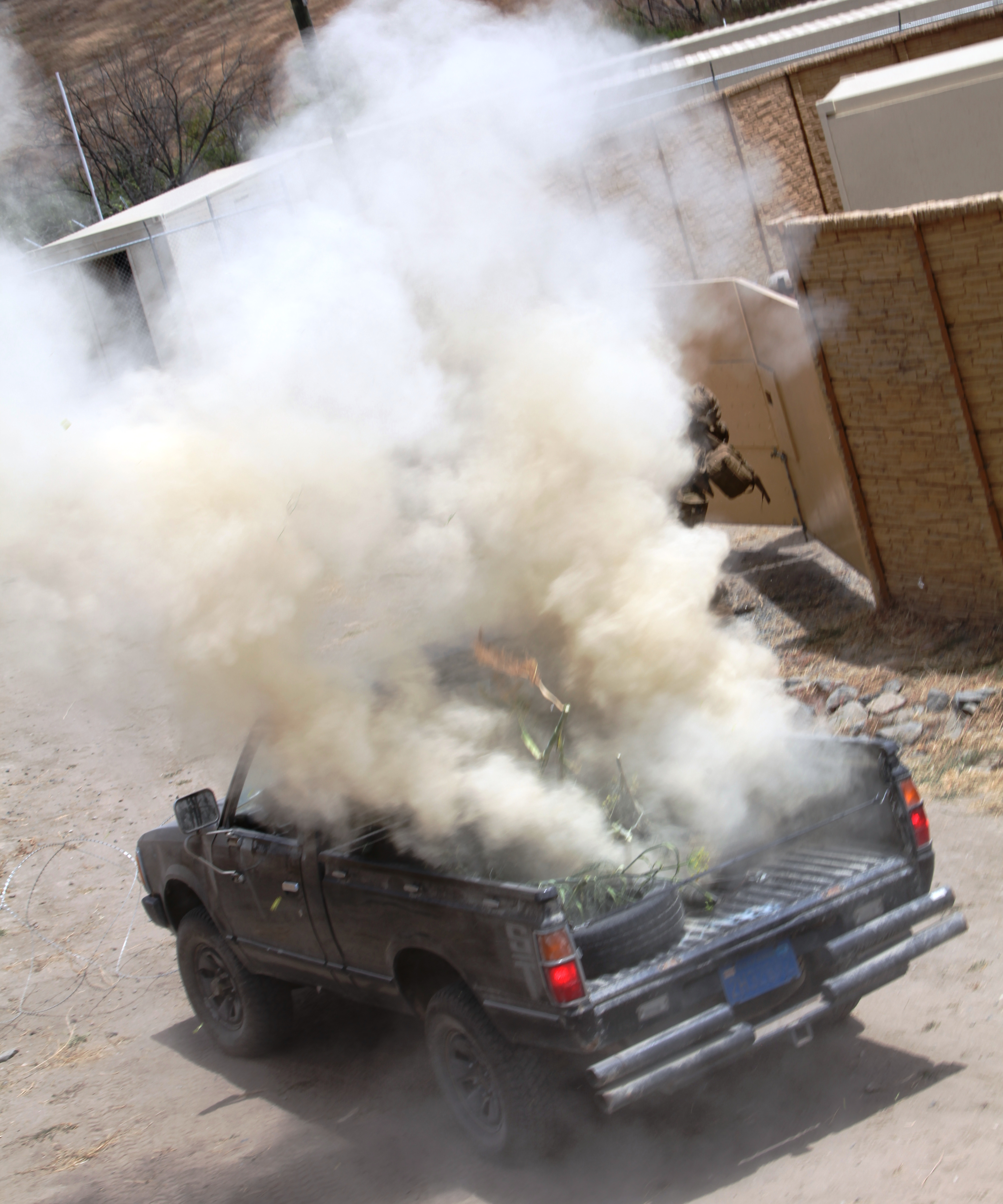
A mock explosion of a pickup truck converted to SVBIED, used by U.S. Marines for OPFOR purposes at Camp Pendleton

Trucks were sometimes used to start an assault, and benefitted from their greater storage space that could contain very heavy explosives. Animal drawn carts, typically pulled by horse or mule, have also been used. Tactically, a single vehicle may be used, or an initial "breakthrough" vehicle, then followed by another vehicle.

While many car bombs are disguised as ordinary vehicles, some that are used against military forces have improvised vehicle armour attached to prevent the driver from being shot when attacking a fortified outpost.

=== Operation ===
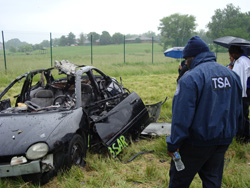
TSA officers view the post-blast remains of a Dodge Neon after an explosive was detonated inside it during training.

Car bombs and detonators function in a diverse manner of ways and there are numerous variables in the operation and placement of the bomb within the vehicle. Earlier and less advanced car bombs were often wired to the car's ignition system, but this practice is now considered more laborious and less effective than other more recent methods, as it requires a greater amount of work for a system that can often be quite easily defused. While it is more common nowadays for car bombs to be fixed magnetically to the underside of the car, underneath the passenger or driver's seat, or inside of the mudguard, detonators triggered by the opening of the vehicle door or by pressure applied to the brakes or accelerating pedals are also used.

Bombs operating by the former method of fixation to the underside of the car more often than not make use of a device called a tilt fuse. A small tube made of glass or plastic, the tilt fuse is similar in operation to a mercury switch or medical tablet tube. One end of the fuse will be filled with mercury, while the other open end is wired with the ends of an open circuit to an electrical firing system. When the tilt fuse moves or is jerked, the supply of mercury will flow to the top of the tube and close the circuit. Thus, as the vehicle goes through the regular bumping and dipping that comes with driving over terrain, the circuit is completed, and the explosive is detonated.

Car bombs are effective as booby traps because they also leave very little evidence. When an explosion happens, it is difficult for forensics to find any evidence because things either denigrate or become charred.

As a safety mechanism to protect the bomber, the placer of the bomb may rig a timing device incorporated with the circuit to activate the circuit only after a certain time period, therefore ensuring the bomber will not accidentally activate the bomb before they are able to get clear of the blast radius.

== Groups that use car bombs ==
=== Americas ===
- The Philadelphia crime family murdered their own boss Philip Testa with nail bomb put in his car on March 15, 1981.
- Although it has never been officially acknowledged, the American CIA has occasionally been accused of being behind car bombings. One such attack was the failed assassination attempt on Grand Ayatollah Mohammad Hussein Fadlallah in the Beirut car bombing on 8 March 1985. Although there has been widespread speculation of CIA involvement, this has never been proven conclusively.
- The Lucchese crime family used a car bomb in an attempt to murder Gambino boss John Gotti as retaliation for having murdered his predecessor Paul Castellano and latter's driver Thomas Bilotti in 1985. But instead of Gotti, the bomb murdered Frank DeCicco on April 13, 1986.
- The Juárez Cartel's armed wing, La Línea, used a car bomb to attack police officers in Ciudad Juárez, Mexico on 15 July 2010.
- The Sinaloa Cartel and the Gulf Cartel were blamed for using car bombs in Nuevo Laredo, Mexico on 24 April 2011 to "heat up" the turf of Los Zetas.

=== Europe ===
- Dissident republicans in Northern Ireland used car bombs during and after the Troubles, the deadliest attack being the Omagh bombing of 1998.
- On October 11, 1985, De Stefano 'ndrina used a car bomb in an attempt to murder boss of rival 'ndrina Antonio Imerti. The bomb that – left Imerti slightly wounded while his 3 bodyguards were killed – triggered the Second 'Ndrangheta war which would end in 1991.
- The Sicilian Mafia boss, Salvatore Riina used between 1983-1993 car bombs in various attacks such as the Capaci bombing or the Via d'Amelio bombing.
- The Security Service of Ukraine used a car bomb in 2022 Crimean Bridge explosion.

=== West Asia ===
- Hezbollah member Imad Mughniyah was assassinated by a car bomb in Syria in 2008, allegedly by Mossad.
- Various Palestinian militant groups such as Hamas, Islamic Jihad, Fatah, and various opposition Islamist groups against both military and civilian Israeli targets.
- Al-Qaeda, in attacks around the world since the 1990s, most notably the 1998 United States embassy bombings.
- During the U.S.-led war in Afghanistan, the Taliban have often employed vehicular explosives against enemy targets. This included not only cars and trucks, but even bicycle bombs.
- Similar to Mossad, other organizations associated with the Israeli government, including the Israel Defense Forces (IDF), have been known to use car bombs to kill rivals of the Israeli state.

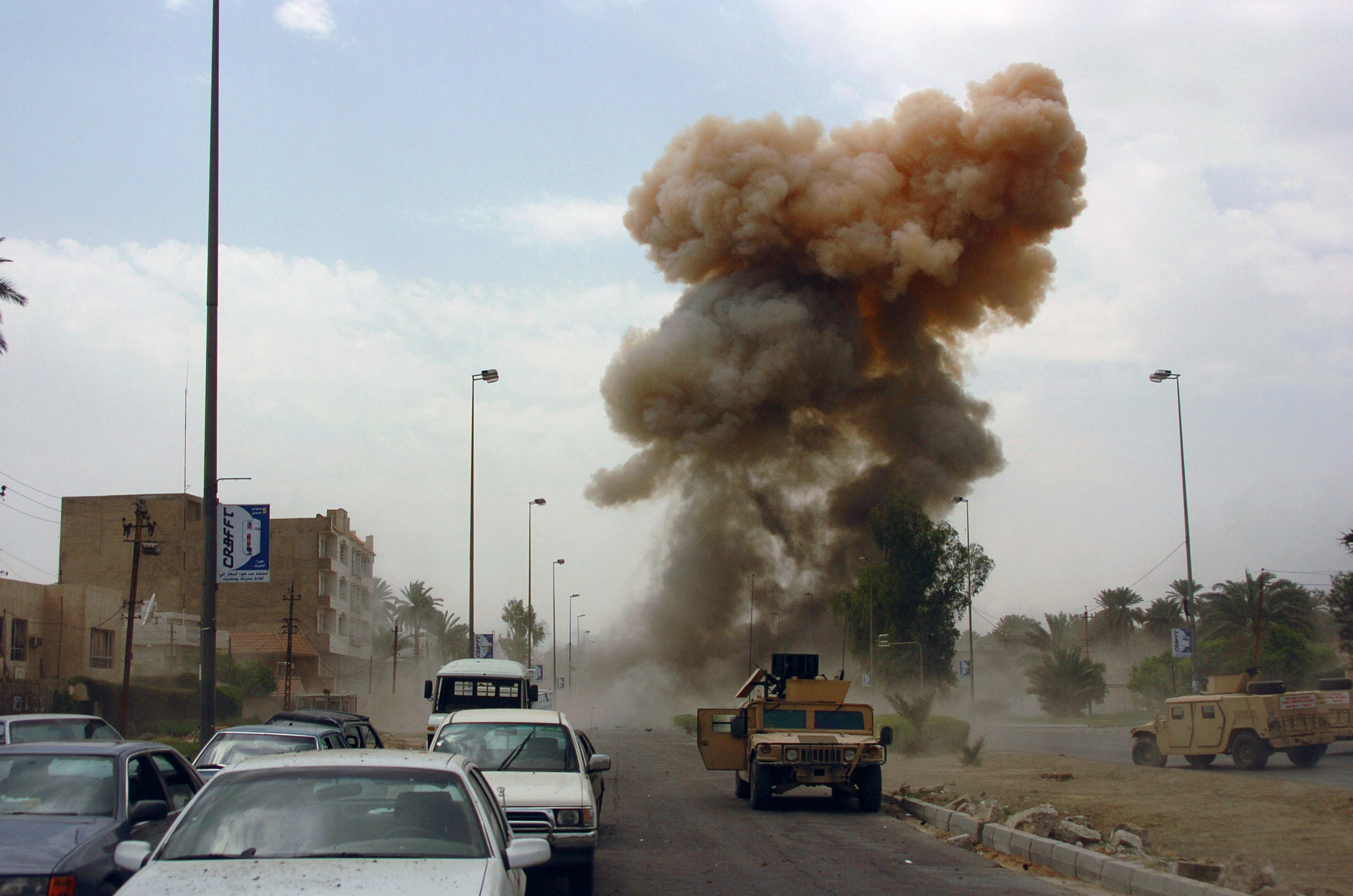
A 2005 car bombing in Iraq, in which a second car bomb was detonated while US forces were investigating the scene of an earlier such blast, resulting in 18 casualties.

- The Iraqi insurgency. An estimated 578 car bombs were detonated in Iraq between June 2003 and June 2006.
- The Islamic State, which has employed armored explosive-laden crossovers, full-sized pickup trucks, and SUVs as suicidal tactical units to breach enemy defensive fronts in Syria and Iraq. The use of armored tractors and haul trucks was also recorded over the course of the war.

=== South Asia ===
- Militants and criminals in India occasionally utilize car bombs in attacks. This includes Muslim, Sikh, Kashmiri and Naxalite militants, as well as rival politicians within the government and organized crime. A notable recent attack was the 25 August 2003 Mumbai bombings, in which two car bombs killed 54 people. The attack was claimed by the Pakistani-backed Kashmiri separatist group Lashkar-e-Taiba.
- The Pakistani Taliban have occasionally used car bombs in their ongoing conflict with the government of Pakistan.

== Timeline ==
=== 20th century ===
- 1920: The Wall Street bombing — Suspected that Italian anarchist Mario Buda (a member of the "Galleanists") parked a horse-drawn wagon filled with explosives and shrapnel in the Financial District of New York City. The blast killed 38 and wounded 143.
- 1927: The Bath School disaster — Andrew Kehoe used a detonator to ignite dynamite and hundreds of pounds of pyrotol which he had secretly planted inside a school. As rescuers started gathering at the school, Kehoe drove up, stopped, and detonated a bomb inside his shrapnel-filled vehicle, killing himself and the school superintendent, and killing and injuring several others. In total, Kehoe killed 44 people and injured 58, making the Bath School bombing the deadliest act of mass murder in a school in U.S. history.
- Militant group Lehi were the first group to use car bombs in the British Mandate for Palestine during the 1940s.

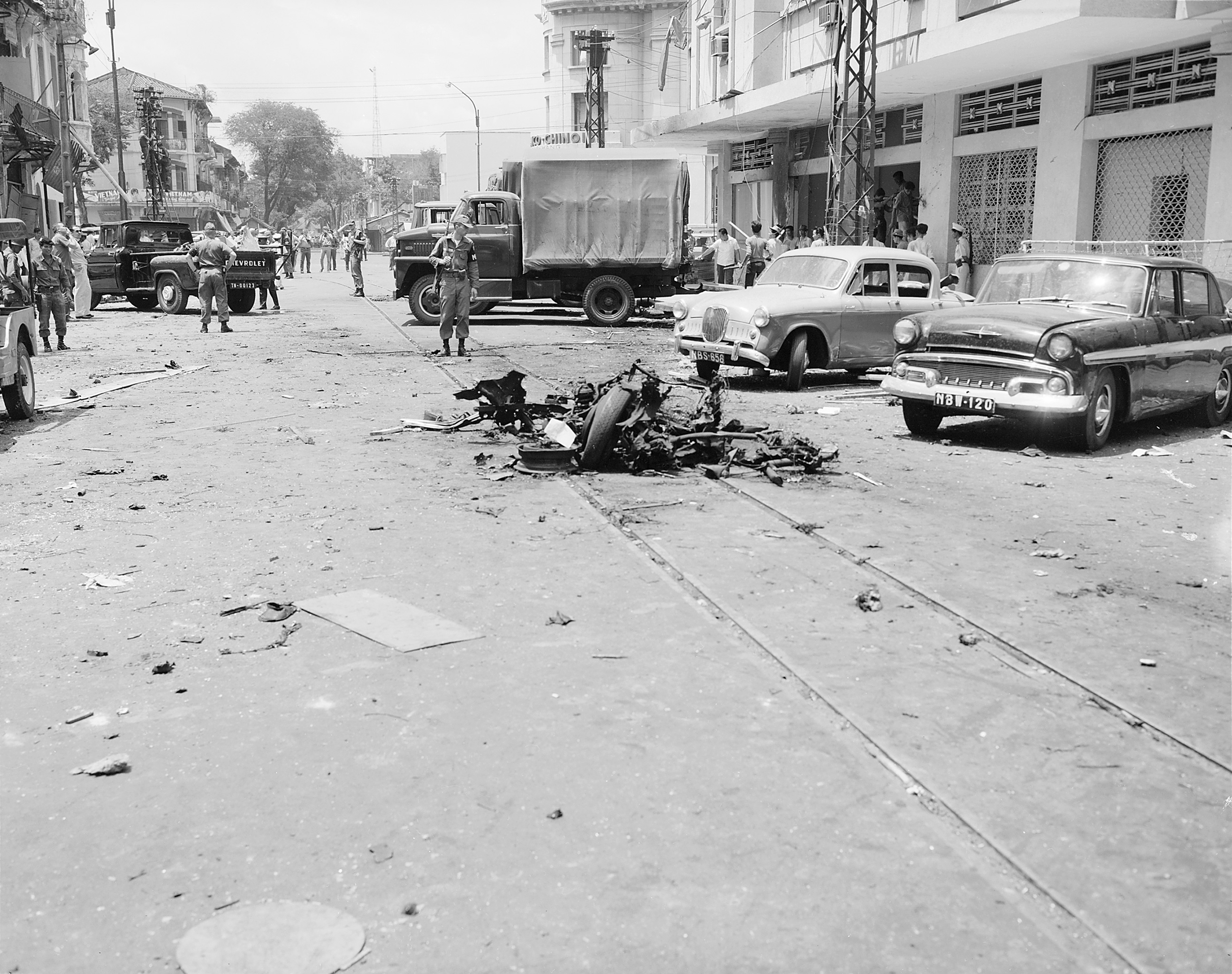
Vietcong car bombing aftermath scene in Saigon, 1965

- The Viet Cong guerrillas used them throughout the Vietnam War in the 1960s and 1970s.
- The OAS used them at the end of the French rule in Algeria in 1961 and 1962.
- The Sicilian Mafia used them to assassinate independent magistrates starting in the 1960s and up to the early 1990s.
- The IRA used them frequently during its 1960s to 1990s campaign during the Troubles in Northern Ireland and England. The 1998 Omagh bombing by the Real IRA, an IRA splinter group, caused the most casualties in the Troubles from a single car bomb. Loyalist organisations in Northern Ireland of the 1960s and 1970s such as the Ulster Volunteer Force (UVF) and Ulster Defence Association used car bombs against civilians in both Northern Ireland and the Republic of Ireland. The 1974 UVF bombs in Dublin and Monaghan caused the most casualties in a single day during the Troubles.
- Palestinian writer Ghassan Kanafani was assassinated by a car bomb on 8 July 1972 with his 17-year-old niece Lamees Najim in Beirut by the Israeli Mossad.
- Former Chilean General Carlos Prats was killed by a car bomb on September 30, 1974, along with his wife.
- Freelance terrorist Carlos the Jackal claimed responsibility for three car bomb attacks on French newspapers accused of pro-Israeli bias during the 1970s.
- Cleveland mobster Danny Greene frequently used car bombs against his enemies, beginning in 1968. Afterwards, they also began to be used against Greene and his associates. The use of car bombs in Cleveland peaked in 1976, when 36 bombs exploded in the city, most of them car bombs, causing it to be nicknamed "Bomb City." Several people, including innocent bystanders, were killed or wounded. Greene himself was finally killed in a car bomb explosion himself, on October 6, 1977.
- Agents of the Chilean intelligence agency DINA were convicted of using car bombs to assassinate Orlando Letelier in 1976 and Carlos Prats in 1974, who were exiled opponents of dictator Augusto Pinochet. Letelier was killed in Sheridan Circle, in the heart of Embassy Row in Washington, D.C.
- The Tamil Tigers of Sri Lanka frequently made use of car bombs during that country's civil war in a campaign which lasted from 1976 until the group's defeat in 2009.
- From 1979 to early 1983, under the guise of the Front for the Liberation of Lebanon from Foreigners, Israel Defense Forces commanders Rafael Eitan, Avigdor Ben-Gal and Meir Dagan launched a campaign of bombings, including car, bicycle, and even donkey bombs. Initially conducted as a response to the killing of Israeli civilians at Nahariya. Largely indiscriminate in its targeting of those associated with the Palestine Liberation Organization in south, Lebanon, the FLLF attacks killed hundreds of Palestinians and Lebanese, mainly in Tyre, Lebanon, Sidon and the surrounding PLO run refugee camps. After 1981, as part of Ariel Sharon's policy of goading the PLO into committing more acts of terror, justifying a military response, FLLF attacks escalated in intensity and scope, spreading to Beirut and northern Lebanon by September. The FLLF even took credit for fictional attacks on the IDF to maintain its cover as a Lebanese organisation. Its most prominent attack on October 1, 1981, in West Beirut killed at least 50 and injured over 250 people. Seven other similar bombs were found and defused before they could explode.
- The German Red Army Faction occasionally used car bombs, such as in an unsuccessful attempt to attack a NATO school for officers in 1984.
- The Basque separatist group Euskadi Ta Askatasuna (ETA) attempted their first car bomb assassination in September 1985 and carried out at least 80 massive car bomb attacks in Spain during the last decade before putting its activities on hold in 2011.
- Constable Angela Taylor died on her way to collect lunch, the sole fatality of the Russell Street bombing in Melbourne, Australia on 27 March 1986. 22 others were injured.
- On 23 November 1986, two members of the Armenian Revolutionary Federation carried out the Melbourne Turkish consulate bombing using a car bomb, which resulted in the death of one of the attackers.
- Suicide car bombs were a regular feature against Israel in the 1982 Lebanon War which lasted from 1982 until Israel's withdrawal in 2000. The bombing campaign was waged by several groups, most prominently Hezbollah.
- In the 1980s, the Colombian drug lord Pablo Escobar used vehicle bombs extensively against government forces and population centers in Colombia and Latin America. The most notable car bombing attack was the 1989 DAS Building bombing, which killed 63 and injured about 1,000. Also, on July 4, 1989, a car bomb killed governor of Antioquia Antonio Roldán Betancur and five others; a prominent member of Escobar's Medellin Cartel later confessed to the crime.
- During the Soviet–Afghan War of the 1980s, at a variety of training camps in the tribal areas of Pakistan, the Pakistani Inter-Services Intelligence (ISI), with the aid of the US Central Intelligence Agency (CIA), trained mujahideen in the preparation of car bombs. Car bombs became a regular occurrence during the war, the Afghan civil conflicts which followed, and then during the U.S. invasion of Afghanistan from 2001 and the war in Afghanistan ending in 2021.
- On 26 February 1993, (World Trade Center bombing) Islamist terrorists led by Ramzi Yousef detonated a Ryder van filled with explosives in the parking garage of the World Trade Center in New York City. Yousef's plan had been to cause one of the towers to collapse into the other, destroying both and killing thousands of people. Although this was not achieved, six people were killed, 1,042 others injured, and extensive damage was caused.
- On 18 April 1993, a tanker containing 500 kilograms of explosives exploded near the mosque in Vitez, destroying the offices of the Bosnian War Presidency, killing at least six people and injuring 50 others. The ICTY accepted that this action was a piece of pure terrorism committed by elements within the Croat forces, as an attack on the Bosniak population of Stari Vitez - Vitez old town. HVO members tied a Bosniak male civilian from a concentration camp to the steering wheel and set the truck in motion towards the old town.
- On 20 October 1994, Hamas-led bus bombing in Tel Aviv, Israel lead to the death of 22 civilians and the injury of 50. At that time, it was the deadliest suicide bombing in Israeli history, and the first successful attack in Tel Aviv.
- The Quebec Biker War that lasted from 1994 to 2002 involved the use of car bombings, including one that killed a drug dealer and an 11-year-old boy on 9 August 1995.
- On 19 April 1995, Timothy McVeigh detonated a Ryder box truck filled with an explosive mixture of ammonium nitrate fertilizer and fuel oil (ANFO) in front of the Alfred P. Murrah Federal Building in Oklahoma City during the Oklahoma City bombing, killing 168 people, including 19 children who were in the daycare.
- On 25 June 1996, a truck bomb destroyed the Khobar Towers military complex in Saudi Arabia, killing 19 United States Air Force (USAF) personnel and injuring 372 persons of all nationalities.
- In the late 1990s and early 2000s, vehicular explosives were used by Chechen nationalists against targets in Russia.
- On 20 April 1999, Eric Harris and Dylan Klebold planned to use two car bombs as the last act of the Columbine High School massacre, apparently to murder first responders. Both failed to explode.

=== 21st century ===
- On 2 December 2001, a Hamas assailant boarded a bus in Haifa, Israel, and then detonated himself, leading to the death of 15 civilians.
- Southeast Asia-based militant Islamist group Jemaah Islamiyah utilized car bombs in their campaigns during the early 2000s, the most prominent being the 2002 Bali bombings, which killed 202 people.
- Former Lebanese Prime Minister Rafic Hariri was assassinated by a car bomb during Valentine's Day of 2005. 21 others were also killed.
- A car bomb which had misfired was discovered in Times Square, New York City on May 1, 2010. The bomb had been planted by Faisal Shahzad. Evidence suggests that the bombing was planned by the Pakistani Taliban.
- On 11 December 2010, a car bomb exploded in central Stockholm in Sweden, slightly injuring two bystanders. Twelve minutes later, an Iraqi-born Swedish citizen accidentally detonated six pipe bombs he was carrying, but only one exploded. The bomber was killed but there were no other casualties. It is believed that the attacks were the work of homegrown terrorists who were protesting Sweden's involvement in the war in Afghanistan and the publication in Sweden of cartoons depicting Muhammad.
- On 22 July 2011, in the Norway massacre, far-right extremist Anders Behring Breivik detonated a car bomb within the executive government quarter of Oslo, Norway, killing 8 and injuring 210+ people. It remains the deadliest bombing in Norway committed by a terrorist.
- In 2013, Afghan security forces intercepted a truck bomb deployed by the Haqqanis. It was the largest truck bomb ever built, with some 61,500 lbs of explosives. It was ultimately defused. The bomb was over 10 times the size of the car bomb used on the Murrah Building in Oklahoma City. While the bomb was not detonated, it caused security changes throughout the region and the closure of the US Army base FOB Goode near Gardez.
- During June 2015, in Ramadi, Iraq, a vehicle-borne IED resulted in the collapse of an 8-story tall building during battle between the Iraqi military and Daesh (ISIS). The Daesh truck bomb was fired upon by a rocket-propelled grenade to detonate it.
- On 30 August 2016, Kurdish female soldier from YPJ, Asia Ramazan Antar, was killed in Manbij offensive, when ISIS suicide bombers drove cars filled with explosives towards the Kurdish front.
- On 16 October 2017, Maltese journalist and blogger Daphne Caruana Galizia died in a car bomb attack.
- On 25 December 2020, a car bomb was detonated in downtown Nashville, Tennessee, injuring at least 8 and killing the perpetrator, Anthony Quinn Warner.
- On 14 November 2021, a car bomb exploded outside of a women's hospital in Liverpool after a man detonated an IED suicide vest inside a taxi, killing him and severely injuring the driver.
- During the Russian invasion of Ukraine, Ukrainian partisans have made extensive use of vehicular bomb attacks on Russian and collaborative officials in occupied areas, such as in the 2022 Crimean Bridge explosion
- On 20 August 2022, Aleksandr Dugin's daughter, Darya Dugina, was killed in Bolshiye Vyazyomy, Moscow Oblast by a bomb placed on Dugin's car.
- In late February 2023, it was reported that the Russian Army attempted to use a MT-LB filled with OFAB-100-120 aerial bombs and mine-clearing charges from the UR-77 vehicle against Ukrainian positions.
- On 18 June 2023, the Russian Army was documented as using a T-55 tank filled with approximately 6 tons of high explosives against entrenched Ukrainian Forces near Marinka, Donetsk Oblast with the intent of clearing the trenches.
- On 10 September 2023, it was reported that Ukraine's 128th Mountain Assault Brigade converted a captured T-62 tank into a VBIED filled with 1.5 tons of explosives and drove it against Russian positions in the Zaporizhzhia region. The tank hit a mine and exploded before it could reach the enemy positions.
- On 13 July 2024, Thomas Matthew Crooks attempted to assassinate Donald Trump, the former president of the United States, at a campaign rally near Butler, Pennsylvania. Crooks's attempt was unsuccessful and he was killed in the process. Following his death, investigators found explosive devices in the trunk of his car, suggesting he planned to set off an explosion remotely as a possible distraction.
- On January 1, 2025, at approximately 8:39 a.m. PST, a Tesla Cybertruck exploded outside the main entrance of the Trump International Hotel in Las Vegas. The driver, identified as 37-year-old U.S. Army Special Forces Sergeant Matthew Alan Livelsberger from Colorado Springs, Colorado, died from a self-inflicted gunshot wound just before the explosion. Seven bystanders sustained minor injuries from the blast.
- On May 17, 2025, at approximately 10:52 a.m. PDT, a silver 2010 Ford Fusion sedan loaded with explosives detonated outside the American Reproductive Centers fertility clinic in Palm Springs, California, resulting in the death of the perpetrator and injuries to four others.
- On November 10, 2025, at approximately 6:52 p.m. a car Hyundai i20 exploded near the Red Fort Metro Station in Delhi, India, killing at least thirteen people and more than 20 people were injured.

== See also ==
- Improvised explosive device (IED)
- Insurgency
- Kamikaze
- Japanese Special Attack Units

== Sources ==
- Mike Davis, Buda's Wagon: A Brief History of the Car Bomb (Verso: New York, 2007).
- Kaaman, Hugo (April 2019). Car Bombs as Weapons of War ISIS's Development of SVBIEDS, 2014-19 (PDF) (Report). Washington, DC: Middle East Institute.
- Armistead, Gene C. (28 August 2013). Horses and Mules in the Civil War: A Complete History with a Roster of More Than 700 War Horses. McFarland. ISBN 978-1-4766-0237-0.
- Kaaman, Hugo (28 October 2020). Shifting Gears: HTS's Evolving Use of SVBIEDs During the Idlib Offensive of 2019-20 (PDF) (Report). Washington, DC: Middle East Institute.
- Lepage, Jean-Denis G. G. (18 November 2014). German Military Vehicles of World War II: An Illustrated Guide to Cars, Trucks, Half-Tracks, Motorcycles, Amphibious Vehicles and Others. McFarland. ISBN 978-0-7864-6252-0.
