= Irene Dunham =

American supercentenarian (1907–2022)

- Born: Irene Blanche Babcock; December 16, 1907; Greenbush Township, Clinton County, Michigan, U.S.
- Died: May 1, 2022 (aged 114); DeWitt Charter Township, Michigan, U.S.
- Resting place: DeWitt City Cemetery; 42.8475°N 84.5675°W
- Education: Bath Consolidated School
- Known for: Final living survivor of the 1927 Bath School disaster

Irene Dunham (born Irene Blanche Babcock; December 16, 1907 – May 1, 2022) was an American supercentenarian and the final living survivor of the 1927 Bath School disaster, the deadliest school massacre in United States history.

== Biography ==
Irene Blanche Babcock was born in Greenbush Township in Clinton County, Michigan in 1907. She grew up on her parents' 141-acre (57 ha) farm in Bath Township, located along the Looking Glass River approximately 4 miles (6.4 km) from the town of Bath. During the 1918 influenza pandemic, Babcock contracted influenza and made a full recovery.

The Bath Consolidated School was built in 1922, and Babcock began attending the school in the seventh grade. She was due to graduate in 1927, and was engaged to Lansing resident Laurits Dunham. The couple planned to marry on May 20, 1927.

On May 18th, the final day of the 1927 school year, Bath Township resident Andrew Kehoe carried out a suicide attack on his family and the school. Kehoe bombed the Bath Consolidated School with a cache of dynamite hidden in the school's basement, killing 45 people in the deadliest school massacre in United States history. Babcock stayed home from school on May 18 due to a sore throat, and was not injured in the bombing. In a 2017 interview, she recounted hearing the bombing from the family farm and rushing with her parents to the school. Her seven younger siblings survived, although one of her brothers was injured in the bombing, losing a finger.

In the wake of the bombing, the school's graduation ceremony was cancelled, and Babcock was hesitant to continue with her wedding. Ultimately, the wedding went ahead as planned on May 20. She took her husband's last name, and Irene and Laurits Dunham had three children. They began living on the north side of Lansing in 1935. Dunham refrained from discussing the bombing for decades, and only began speaking about it with family members in the 1970s.

Laurits died in 1972. Later in the 1970s, Dunham became a snowbird, living in Florida during the winter months, a lifestyle that she maintained for 17 years before returning to her Lansing home full-time. The Bath High School graduating class of 1977 invited the 1927 class to participate in their graduation ceremony, and Dunham finally received her high school diploma. Dunham was diagnosed with colon cancer at the age of 90, which was successfully treated with chemotherapy and surgery.

Dunham became a centenarian in 2007, and regularly drove a car until the age of 106. She became a supercentenarian in 2017, and lived independently in her home in Lansing until 2020, when she moved to a nursing home in DeWitt Township. On March 2, 2021, Dunham became the oldest living person in the state of Michigan. Before her death, Dunham was able to meet her first great-great-great-grandchild.

Dunham died on May 1, 2022, at the age of 114 years and 136 days. She is buried in the DeWitt City Cemetery in the city of DeWitt.
