= Pyrotol catalyst =

Catalyst used in production of benzene

Pyrotol is a catalyst used in the industrial production of benzene through a process known as pyrolysis. It is a proprietary chromium-alumina catalyst manufactured by Clariant International (formerly known as Sud-Chemie) and licensed exclusively to CB&I Lummus Technology, Inc. It is completely unrelated to the explosive pyrotol.
