= Carleton W. Angell =

American sculptor

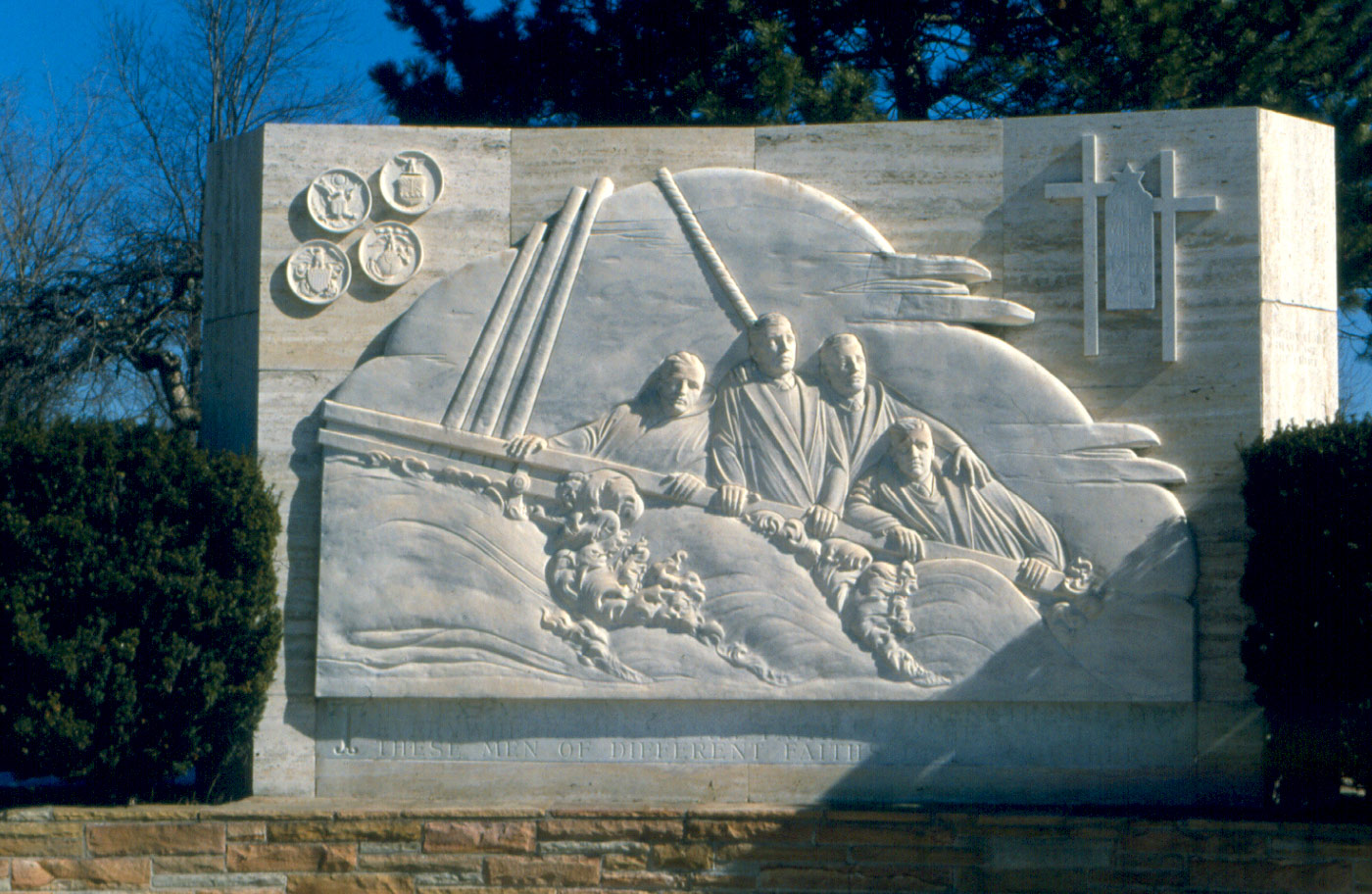
- Four Chaplains Monument, Ann Arbor, Michigan
- Born: Carleton Watson Angell; February 26, 1887; Belding, Michigan, US
- Died: June 1, 1962 (aged 75); Ann Arbor, Michigan, US
- Education: Chicago Art Institute
- Occupation: Sculptor
- Employer: University of Michigan

Carleton Watson Angell (February 26, 1887 – June 1, 1962) was an American sculptor. He was born in Belding, Michigan and died in Ann Arbor, Michigan. He is buried in Washtenong Memorial Gardens near the World War I Veterans Memorial, under a plaque designed by artist Stanley Kellogg.

== Career ==
Angell studied sculpture at the School of the Art Institute of Chicago and while in Chicago did some designing, and likely modeling, for the American Terra Cotta Company and the Ceramic Company. In 1922, he and his wife Gladys moved to Ann Arbor when he was hired by the University of Michigan to teach freehand drawing. In 1926 he became the Museums Artist where he created, among things, plaster models of various animals, many of them prehistoric, that were used in the museum's displays. In the course of his 30 years at the University of Michigan he also created numerous portraits and busts and plaques of U of M notables, and these can be found spread all over the university campus.

== Public works ==
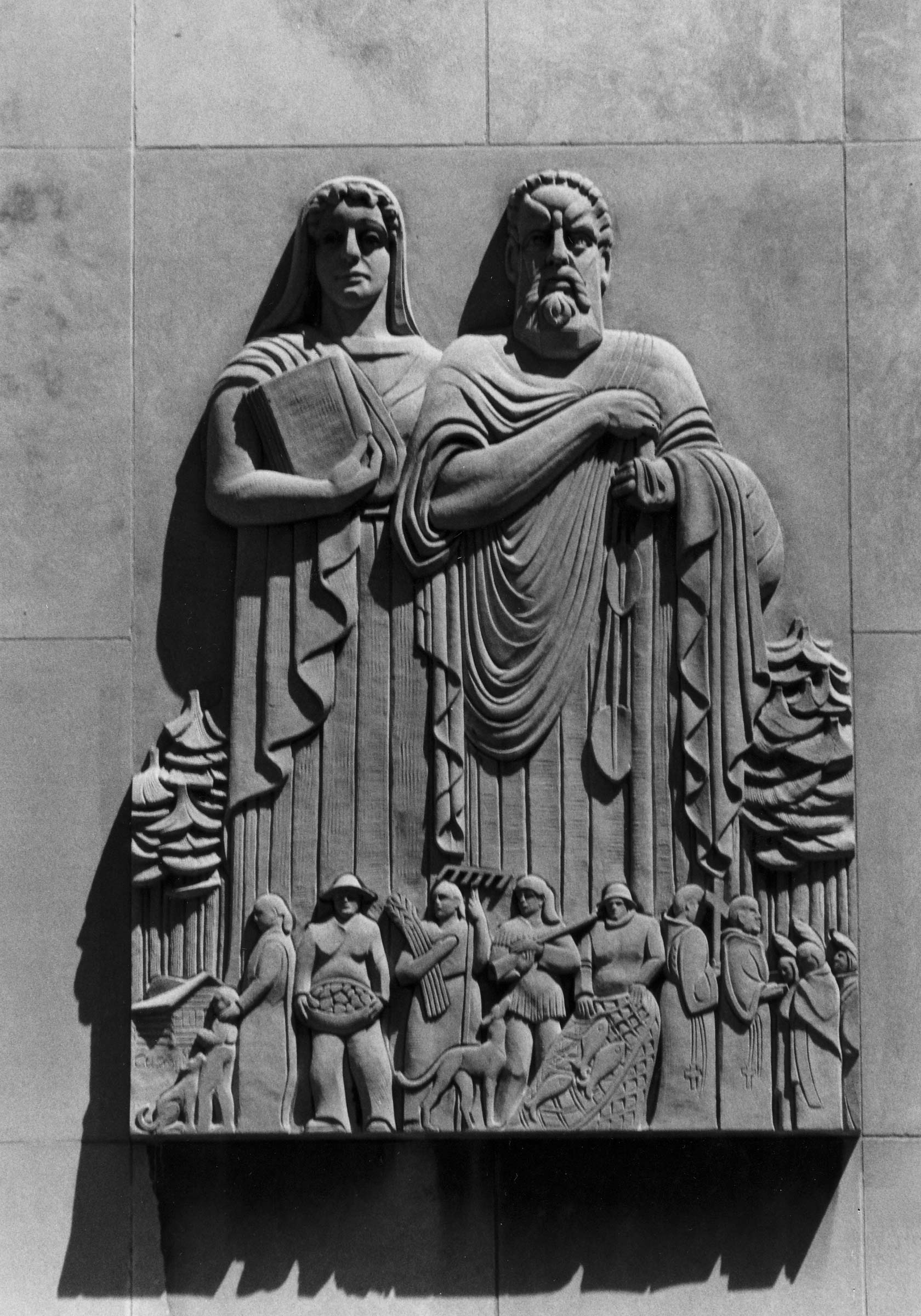
Washtenaw County Court House

- Girl with a Cat, Bath School disaster memorial, James Couzens Memorial Auditorium, Bath Middle School, Bath, Michigan, 1928
- Veterans Memorial, Washtenaw Memorial Gardens, Ann Arbor, Michigan, 1932
- Pumas Museum of Natural History, University of Michigan, Ann Arbor Michigan, 1940
- Four Chaplains Memorial, Arbor Crest memorial Park, Ann Arbor, Michigan, 1954

== Architectural sculpture ==
- Cartouche over main entrance, Museum of Natural History, University of Michigan, Ann Arbor Michigan, Albert Kahn, architect, 1928
- Two panels, Washtenaw County Courthouse, Ann Arbor, Michigan, Ralph Gerganoff, architect, 1956
