= Bath School disaster =

1927 bombing attacks in Bath Township, Michigan

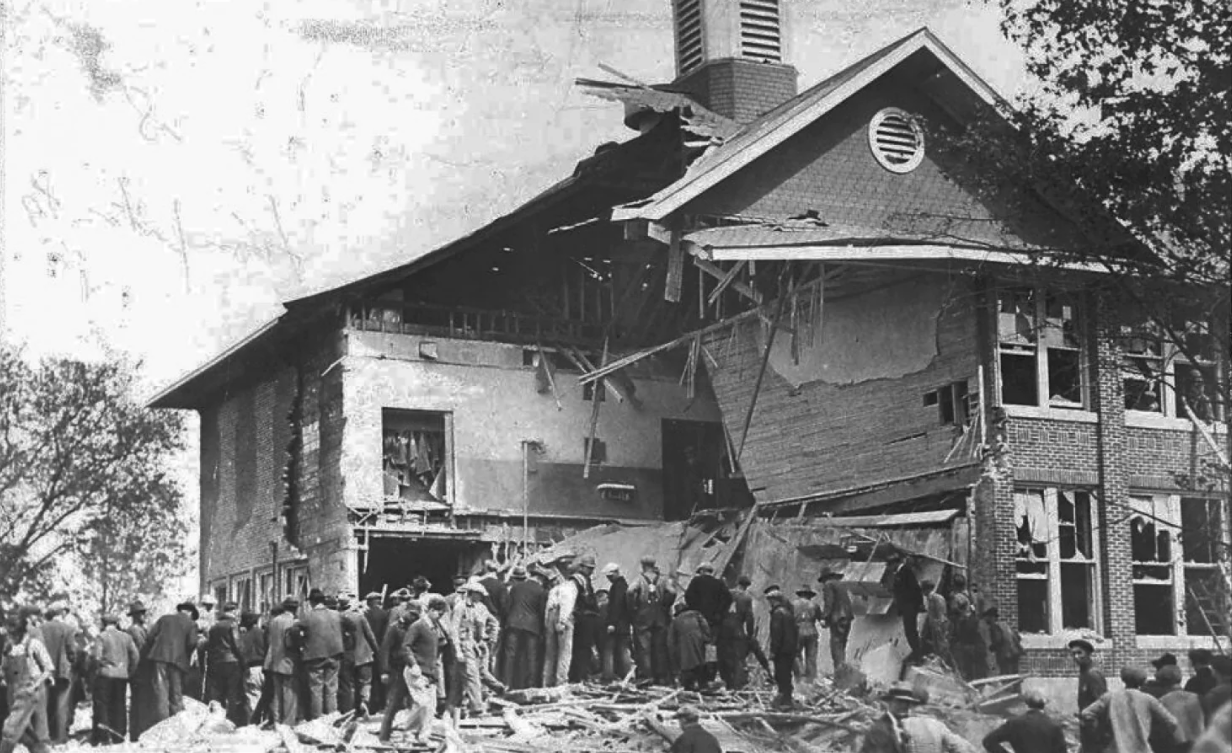
- Bath Consolidated School after the bombing
- Location: 42°49′00″N 84°26′57″W; Bath Charter Township, Michigan, U.S.
- Date: May 18, 1927; 99 years ago
- Target: Bath Consolidated School, house and farm
- Attack type: School bombing; mass murder; suicide attack; domestic terrorism
- Weapons: Dynamite; Pyrotol; Incendiary devices (Note: Incendiary devices are devices set up to cause fires to go off at a certain time and are sometimes colloquially known as "firebombs". Kehoe did not construct what would be defined as a firebomb though, since all of the fires he caused were not dropped or thrown like a bomb but were instead fires started by hooking up explosive and combustible materials like pyrotol to timing systems such as clocks.); Winchester Model 54 bolt-action rifle
- Deaths: 45 (including the perpetrator) (Note: Thirty-eight people were killed in the school bombing, five in the truck bombing (including Kehoe). He killed his wife at their farm sometime before the mass casualties and a 44th victim initially survived the school bombing but later died in the hospital.)
- Injuries: 58
- Perpetrator: Andrew Philip Kehoe
- Motive: Inconclusive (Note: Potential motives include: Suicidal ideation; Revenge for perceived social and political slights; Financial difficulties combined with an injustice collector personality; Possible personality disorders such as antisocial personality disorder)

The Bath School disaster (Note: The word "disaster" to describe this event is a historic term. "Bath School disaster" is what the event's survivors called it, as did contemporaneous news accounts, historic documents, plus area memorials and current Michigan State historic markers. Reliable sources include human-made disasters alongside natural disasters in their definitions of the word.) was a series of violent explosive attacks perpetrated by Andrew Kehoe upon the Bath Consolidated School in Bath Township, Michigan, United States, on May 18, 1927. That morning, Kehoe, the school treasurer of the township, detonated explosives he had previously planted underneath the school building, killing 38 people. As rescue efforts began, he drove to the school in a truck filled with explosives and shrapnel, where he detonated it, killing himself and four others. Earlier the same day, he had also destroyed his farmstead with explosives, burning the body of his wife, Nellie Price Kehoe. (Note: Price Kehoe was murdered by her husband sometime between being discharged from a hospital on May 16 and the bombings two days later. "That at sometime between the evening of May 16th, 1927, and 8:45 A. M. on May 18th, 1927, the said Andrew P. Kehoe murdered his wife, Nellie Kehoe, at their farm home located on Section 19 of Bath Township;") Many more were injured, and one child died months later after surgery.

Kehoe, who was Bath's school board treasurer, was angered by increased taxes and being defeated in the April 5, 1926, election for Bath Township clerk. It was thought by locals that he had planned revenge following his defeat. Kehoe had a reputation as a difficult man, both on the school board and in his personal life. In addition, he was notified in June 1926 that his mortgage was soon to be foreclosed. For much of the next year, Kehoe purchased explosives and secretly hid them on his property and under the school.

During the rescue and recovery efforts, searchers discovered a further 500 pounds (230 kg) of explosives under the south wing of the school that had been set to detonate simultaneously with the initial explosion. With this discovery, it was determined that Kehoe's intention was to destroy the entire school and everyone in it.

The Bath School disaster remains the deadliest school attack in United States history.

== Background ==
=== Bath Township ===
At the time of the bombing, Bath Township was a civil township of 300 adult residents located 10 miles (16 km) northeast of the city of Lansing in the U.S. state of Michigan. The present-day municipality of Bath Charter Township covers 31 square miles (80 km^{2}) and the small unincorporated village of Bath is within its borders. The township itself lies within Clinton County, Michigan, an area of about 566 square miles (1,470 km^{2}).

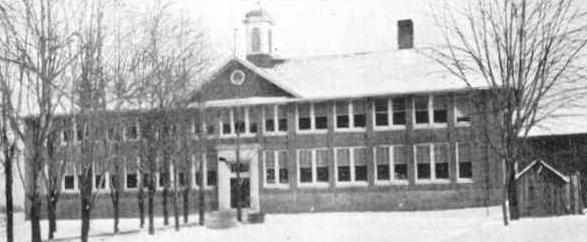
Bath Consolidated School before the bombing

In the early 1920s, the area was primarily agricultural. After years of debate, Bath Township voters approved the creation of a consolidated school district in 1922, along with an increase in township property taxes to fund a new school. When the school opened, 236 students were enrolled from grade 1 to grade 12. The school's creation was controversial, but in Bath resident Monty Ellsworth's opinion consolidated schools had great advantages over the smaller rural schools they replaced. (Note: Ellsworth wrote the first book published about this event, The Bath School Disaster.) All landowners within the township area were required to pay higher ad valorem property taxes.

=== Perpetrator ===
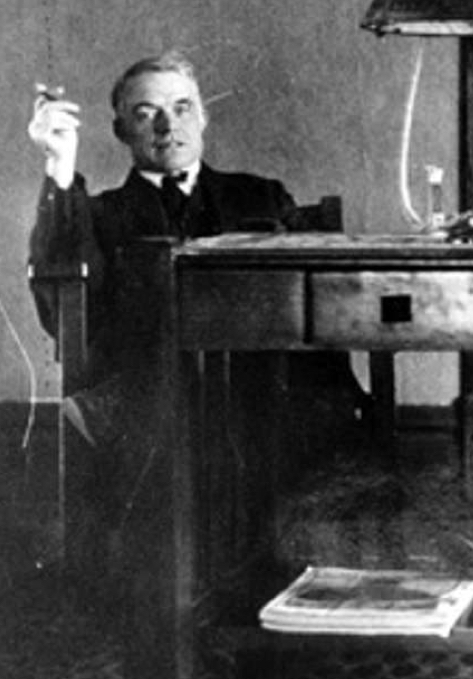
Andrew Kehoe, c. 1920

Andrew Philip Kehoe was born in Tecumseh, Michigan on February 1, 1872 into a family of 13 children and attended the local high school. After graduating, he studied electrical engineering at Michigan State College in East Lansing and moved to St. Louis, Missouri, where he worked as an electrician for several years. At some point during this period, Kehoe suffered a head injury in a fall and was semiconscious or in a coma for a period of several weeks. He later returned to Michigan and his father's farm.

After his mother's death, Kehoe's father married a much younger widow, Frances Wilder, and a daughter was born. On September 17, 1911, as his stepmother attempted to light the family's oil stove, it exploded and set her on fire. Kehoe threw a bucket of water on her, but as the fire was oil-based, the water spread the flames more rapidly and her body was engulfed with fire. The injuries were fatal and she died the next day. Some of Kehoe's later neighbors in Bath Township believed that he had caused the stove explosion. (Note: Monty Ellsworth's version of these events in The Bath School Disaster incorrectly differs on one detail—he says that the fire happened when Kehoe was aged 14 but agrees with other sources on points of fact. He does mention the rumors that the stove was tampered with.)

Kehoe married Ellen "Nellie" Price in 1912 at the age of 40. Seven years later, they moved to a farm outside Bath Township. Kehoe was said to be dependable, doing favors and volunteer work for his neighbors. He was also described as notoriously impatient. For example, he had shot and killed a neighbor's dog that had come on his property and annoyed him by barking. He had also beaten one of his horses to death when it did not perform to his expectations.

Kehoe had a reputation for frugality and was elected in 1924 as a trustee on the school board for three years and treasurer for one year. He argued strongly for lower taxes, and later superintendent of the board M. W. Keyes said that he "fought the expenditure of money for the most necessary equipment". Kehoe was considered difficult, often voting against the rest of the board, wanting his own way and arguing with the township's financial authorities. He protested that he paid too much in taxes and tried to have the valuation of his property reduced to lower his tax burden.

In 1922, the Bath Township school tax was $12.26 for every $1,000 valuation of a property, with the valuation on Kehoe's farm being $10,000 (equivalent to $192,346 in 2025). In 1923, the school board raised the tax to $18.80 per $1,000 valuation and in 1926 the taxes increased to $19.80. This meant that Kehoe's tax liability increased from $122.60 in 1922 (equivalent to $2,358 in 2025) to $198.00 in 1926 (equivalent to $3,601 in 2025). In June 1926, Kehoe was notified that the widow of his wife's uncle, who held the mortgage on his property, had begun foreclosure proceedings. Following the disaster, the sheriff who had served the foreclosure notice reported that Kehoe had muttered, "If it hadn't been for that $300 school tax I might have paid off this mortgage". Mrs. Price, the mortgage holder, also reported that Kehoe had stated, "If I can't live in that house, no one else will" when she had mentioned foreclosure to him.

Kehoe was appointed in 1925 as temporary town clerk, but he was defeated in the April 5, 1926 election for that office. This public rejection by the community angered him. This defeat may have triggered Kehoe's desire for murderous revenge, using the bombings to destroy the Bath Consolidated School and kill the community's children and many of its members. In Bath Massacre – America's First School Bombing, Arnie Bernstein cites Robert D. Hare's Psychopathy Checklist and writes that Kehoe "fits the profile all too well". Carnegie Mellon University professor Mary Ellen O'Toole has stated that Kehoe could be described as an "injustice collector", someone who obsessively collects perceived slights along with their personal misfortunes, building feelings of persecution until they feel forced to act violently.

Kehoe's neighbor A. McMullen noted that Kehoe had stopped working on his farm altogether for most of the preceding year, and he had speculated that Kehoe was planning suicide. Kehoe had given him one of his horses about April 1927, but McMullen returned it for this reason. It was discovered later that Kehoe had cut all of his wire fences as part of his preparations to destroy his farm, girdling young shade trees to kill them and cutting his grapevine plants before returning them to their stumps to hide the damage. He gathered lumber and other materials and put them in the tool shed, which he later destroyed with an incendiary bomb.

By the time of the bombing, Nellie Kehoe had become chronically ill with what resembled tuberculosis, for which there was no effective treatment or cure at the time. Her frequent hospital stays may have contributed to the family's debt. Kehoe had ceased mortgage and homeowner's insurance payments months earlier.

=== Purchase and planting of explosives ===
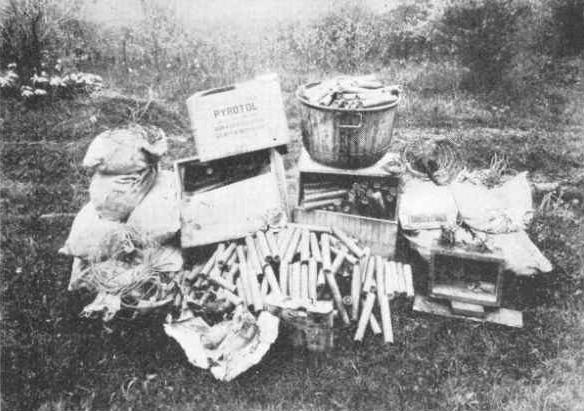
Explosives recovered from under the school

There is no clear indication of when Kehoe had the idea of massacring the schoolchildren and townspeople, but Ellsworth, who was a neighbor, thought that he conceived his plan after being defeated in the 1926 clerk election. The consensus of the townspeople was that he had worked on his plan at least since the previous August. Bath School Board member M. W. Keyes was quoted by The New York Times:

I have no doubt that he made his plans last Fall [1926] to blow up the school ... He was an experienced electrician and the board employed him in November to make some repairs on the school lighting system. He had ample opportunity then to plant the explosives and lay the wires for touching it off.

Kehoe had free access to the school building during the summer vacation of 1926. From mid-1926, he began buying more than a ton of pyrotol, an incendiary explosive used by farmers in that era for excavation and burning debris. In November 1926 he drove to Lansing and bought two boxes of dynamite at a sporting goods store. Dynamite was also commonly used on farms, so his purchase of small amounts of explosives at different stores and on different dates did not raise any suspicions. Neighbors reported hearing explosions on the farm, with one calling him "the dynamite farmer".

After the disaster it was reported that Michigan State Police investigators had discovered that a considerable amount of dynamite had been stolen from a bridge construction site and that Kehoe was suspected of the theft. Investigators also recovered a container of gasoline, rigged with a tube, in the school's basement; investigators speculated that Kehoe had planned that the gasoline fumes would ignite from a spark, scattering burning gasoline throughout the basement. In the undamaged section of the school it was found that Kehoe had concealed the explosives in six lengths of eavestrough pipe, three bamboo fishing rods and what were described as "windmill rods" that were placed in the basement ceiling.

Kehoe purchased a .30-caliber Winchester bolt-action rifle in December 1926, according to the testimony of Lieutenant Lyle Morse, a Michigan State Police investigator with the Department of Public Safety. (Note: Ellsworth said in his account: I went down there to use their telephone last winter, about February 1927, and he had just been shooting at the target. When I got through using the telephone, he showed me his new thirty Winchester bolt action rifle that he had bought two or three months before. This sets the Winchester's date of purchase at two to three months before February 1927, with the bombings (May 18, 1927) five or six months after purchase. Ellsworth's recollection was corroborated by Lt. Morse's testimony before the coroner's inquest.)

=== Further preparations ===
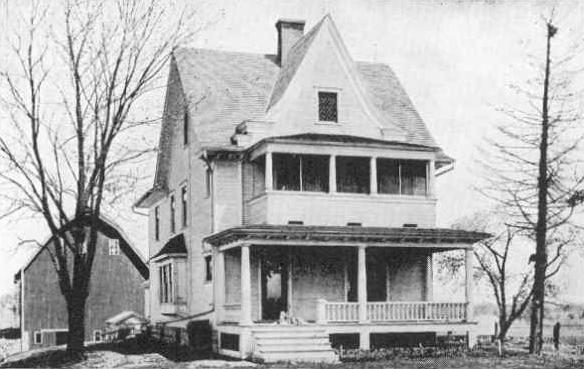
Andrew and Nellie Kehoe's house before the disaster

Prior to the day of the disaster, Kehoe had loaded the back seat of his truck with metal debris capable of producing shrapnel during an explosion. He also bought a new set of tires for his truck to avoid breaking down when transporting the explosives. He made many trips to Lansing for more explosives, as well as to the school, the township, and his house. Ida Hall, who lived in a house next to the school, saw activity around the building on different nights during May. Early one morning after midnight she saw a man carrying objects inside. She also saw vehicles around the building several times late at night. Hall mentioned these events to a relative but they were never reported to police.

Nellie was discharged from Lansing's St. Lawrence Hospital on May 16, and was murdered by her husband some time between her release and the bombings two days later. Kehoe put her body in a wheelbarrow at the rear of the farm's chicken coop, where it was found in a heavily charred condition after the farm explosions and fire. Piled around the cart were silverware and a metal cash box. The ashes of several banknotes could be seen through a slit in the cash box. Kehoe placed and wired homemade pyrotol incendiary devices in the house and throughout the farm buildings.

== Day of the disaster ==
=== Farm bombs ===
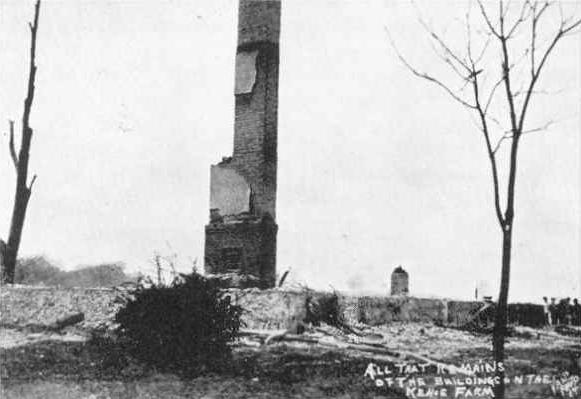
The ruins of the Kehoes' farm after the explosion

At approximately 8:45 a.m. on Wednesday, May 18, Kehoe detonated the devices in his house and farm buildings, causing some debris to fly into a neighbor's poultry brooding house. Neighbors noticed the fire, and volunteers rushed to the scene.

O. H. Bush (Note: This name is given in The New York Times as "O. H. Buck" but in the coroner's inquest as "O. H. Bush". The inquest is an official government document, so his name is rendered as O. H. Bush in this article.) and several other men crawled through a broken window of the farmhouse in search of survivors. When they found no one in the house, they salvaged what furniture they could before the fire spread into the living room. Bush discovered dynamite in the corner; he picked up an armful of explosives and handed it to one of the men. As Kehoe left the burning property in his Ford truck, he stopped to tell those fighting the fire that they should get to the school and then drove off.

=== North wing explosion ===
Classes at Bath Consolidated School began at 8:30 a.m. Kehoe had set an alarm clock in the basement of the school's north wing which detonated the dynamite and pyrotol he had hidden there at about 8:45 a.m. Rescuers heading to the scene of the Kehoe farm fire heard the explosion at the school building and turned back in that direction. Parents within the rural community rushed to the school. The school building resembled a war zone, with 38 people killed in the initial explosion, mostly children.

Eyewitnesses and survivors were interviewed afterwards by newspaper reporters. First-grade teacher Bernice Sterling told an Associated Press reporter that the explosion was like an earthquake:

... the air seemed to be full of children and flying desks and books. Children were tossed high in the air, some were catapulted out of the building

Eyewitness Robert Gates said the scene was pure chaos at the school:

Mother after mother came running into the school yard, and demanded information about her child and, on seeing the lifeless form lying on the lawn, sobbed and swooned ... In no time more than 100 men at work tearing away the debris of the school, and nearly as many women were frantically pawing over the timber and broken bricks for traces of their children. I saw more than one woman lift clusters of bricks held together by mortar heavier than the average man could have handled without a crowbar.

Ellsworth recounted:

I saw one mother, Mrs. Eugene Hart, sitting on the bank a short distance from the school with a little dead girl on each side of her and holding a little boy, Percy, who died a short time after they got him to the hospital. This was about the time Kehoe blew his car up in the street, severely wounding Perry, the oldest child of Mr. and Mrs. Hart".

The north wing of the school had collapsed, leaving the edge of the roof on the ground. Ellsworth recalled that "there was a pile of children of about five or six under the roof". He volunteered to drive back to his farm and get a rope heavy enough to pull the school roof off the children's bodies. Returning to his farm, he saw Kehoe driving in the opposite direction, heading toward the school. "He grinned and waved his hand," Ellsworth said. "When he grinned, I could see both rows of his teeth".

=== Truck explosion ===
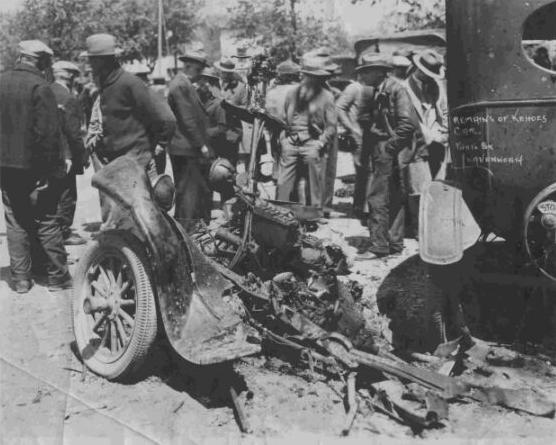
Remains of Kehoe's Ford truck after the explosion

Kehoe drove up to the school about half an hour after the first explosion. He saw Superintendent Emory Huyck and summoned him over to his truck. Charles Rawson testified at the coroner's inquest that he saw the two men grapple over some type of long gun before Kehoe detonated the explosives stored in his truck, (Note: During the Coroner's Inquest Clinton County Prosecutor Searl, when questioning witnesses mentions a rifle/the rifle at least 17 times. He also established that Kehoe seemed to only own a Winchester and that two weeks before the disaster, Kehoe had at least 1,000 cartridges for the Winchester in a box behind the truck's front seat, which could have been the explosives that detonated the truck explosion. The explosion was so powerful that identifying the exact model of gun that set off the truck or even what exactly did set off the truck was impossible but the inference from the testimony is that Kehoe shooting off the Winchester was the detonator.) immediately killing himself, Huyck, retired farmer Nelson McFarren, and Cleo Clayton, an 8-year-old second-grader. Clayton had survived the first blast and then wandered out of the school building; he was killed by shrapnel from the exploding vehicle.

The truck explosion spread debris over a large area and caused extensive damage to cars parked a half-block away, with their roofs catching on fire from the burning gasoline. It injured several others and mortally wounded postmaster Glenn O. Smith, who lost a leg and died before making it to the hospital. O. H. Bush recalled that one of his crew bound up "the wounds of Glenn Smith, the postmaster. His leg had been blown off".

=== Recovery and rescue ===
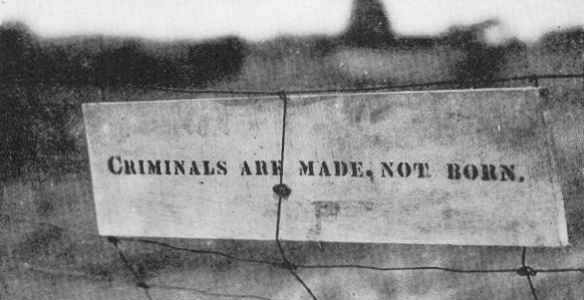
The stenciled message Kehoe constructed and left on a fence at his farm

Telephone operators stayed at their stations for hours to summon doctors, undertakers, area hospital workers, and anyone else who might help. The Lansing Fire Department sent several firefighters and its chief. Local physician J. A. Crum and his wife, a nurse, who had both served in World War I, turned their Bath Township drugstore into a triage center. The dead bodies were taken to the town hall, which was used as a morgue.

Hundreds of people worked in the wreckage all day and into the night in an effort to find and rescue any children pinned underneath. Area contractors sent all their men to assist, and many other people came to the scene in response to pleas for help. Eventually, thirty-four firefighters and the chief of the Lansing Fire Department arrived, as did several Michigan State Police officers who managed traffic to and from the scene. Michigan governor Fred W. Green arrived during the afternoon of the disaster and assisted in the relief work, carting bricks away from the scene. The Lawrence Baking Company of Lansing sent a truck filled with pies and sandwiches which were served to rescuers in the township's community hall.

The injured and dying were transported to Sparrow Hospital and St. Lawrence Hospital in Lansing. The construction of the St. Lawrence facility had been financed in large part by Lawrence Price, Nellie Kehoe's uncle and formerly an executive in charge of Oldsmobile's Lansing Car Assembly.

During the search for survivors and victims, rescuers found an additional 500 pounds (230 kg) of dynamite which had failed to detonate in the south wing of the school. The search was halted to allow the state police to disarm the devices, and they found an alarm clock timed to go off at 8:45 a.m. Investigators speculated that the initial explosion may have caused a short circuit in the second set of bombs, preventing them from detonating. They searched the building and then returned to the recovery work.

Police and fire officials gathered at the Kehoe farm to investigate the fires there. State troopers had searched for Nellie Kehoe throughout Michigan, thinking that she was at a tuberculosis sanatorium, but her charred remains were found the day after the disaster, among the ruins of the farm. All the Kehoe farm buildings were destroyed. Kehoe's two horses had burned to death, trapped inside the barn. Their carcasses were found with their legs hobbled together with wire, preventing their escape or rescue. Investigators found a wooden sign wired to the farm's fence with Kehoe's last message stenciled on it: "Criminals are made, not born."

== Aftermath ==
Killed in the disaster
Before the school bombing
- Ellen "Nellie" Price Kehoe, wife of the perpetrator
Killed in the school bombing
- Arnold Victor Bauerle, age 8, 3rd grade
- Henry Bergan, age 14, 6th grade
- Herman Bergan, age 11, 4th grade
- Emilie Marian Bromundt, age 11, 5th grade
- Robert F. Bromundt, age 12, 5th grade
- Floyd Edwin Burnett, age 12, 6th grade
- Russell Chapman, age 8, 4th grade
- Forest Robert "Bobby" Cochran, age 8, 3rd grade
- Ralph Albert Cushman, age 7, 3rd grade
- Earl Edwin Ewing, age 11, 6th grade
- Katherine Onalee Foote, age 10, 6th grade
- Marjorie Fritz, age 9, 4th grade
- Carlyle Walter Geisenhaver, age 9, 4th grade
- George Hall, Jr., age 8, 3rd grade
- Willa Marie Hall, age 11, 5th grade
- Iola Irene Hart, age 12, 6th grade
- Percy Eugene Hart, age 11, 3rd grade
- Vivian Oletta Hart, age 8, 3rd grade
- Blanche Elizabeth Harte, age 30, teacher
- Galen Lyle Harte, age 12, 6th grade
- LaVere Robert Harte, age 9, 4th grade
- Stanley Horace Harte, age 12, 6th grade
- Francis Otte Hoeppner, age 13, 6th grade
- Cecil Lorn Hunter, age 13, 6th grade
- Doris Elaine Johns, age 8, 3rd grade
- Thelma Irene McDonald, age 8, 3rd grade
- Clarence Wendell McFarren, age 13, 6th grade
- James Emerson Medcoff, age 8, 4th grade
- Emma Amelia Nickols, age 13, 6th grade
- Richard Dibble Richardson, age 12, 6th grade
- Elsie Mildred Robb, age 12, 6th grade
- Pauline Mae Shirts, age 10, 5th grade
- Hazel Iva Weatherby, age 20, teacher
- Elizabeth Jane Witchell, age 10, 5th grade
- Lucile June Witchell, age 9, 5th grade
- Harold LeMoyne Woodman, age 8, 3rd grade
- George Orval Zimmerman, age 10, 3rd grade
- Lloyd Zimmerman, age 12, 5th grade
Killed by the truck bombing
- G. Cleo Clayton(also spelled "Claton"), age 8, 2nd grade
- Emory E. Huyck, age 33, superintendent
- Andrew Philip Kehoe, age 55, perpetrator
- Nelson McFarren, age 74, retired farmer
- Glenn O. Smith, age 33, postmaster
Died later
- Beatrice Gibbs, age 10, 4th grade
- Richard A. Fritz, age 8, 3rd grade**- (Note: Fritz died almost a year after the disaster from myocarditis. His name is not listed on the Couzens Memorial Park marker, on the list of victims plaque at the Bath School Museum, or in Ellsworth's 1927 list of the injured. There is a theory that his myocarditis could have been caused by an infection resulting from injuries he sustained in the attack. His death certificate has myocarditis listed as a primary cause of death with "corrhea"[sic] as a contributory cause.)

The American Red Cross set up an operations center at the Crum drugstore and took the lead in providing aid and comfort to the victims. The Lansing Red Cross headquarters stayed open until 11:30 that night to answer telephone calls, update the list of dead and injured, and provide information and planning services for the following day. The local community responded generously, as reported at the time by the Associated Press: "a sympathetic public assured the rehabilitation of the stricken community. Aid was tendered freely in the hope that the grief of those who lost loved ones might be even slightly mitigated." The Red Cross managed donations sent to pay for medical expenses of the survivors and the burial costs of the deceased. In a few weeks, $5,284.15 (equivalent to $97,939 in 2025) was raised through donations, including $2,500 from the Clinton County Board of Supervisors and $2,000 from the Michigan Legislature.

The disaster received nationwide coverage in the days following, sharing headlines with Charles Lindbergh's transatlantic crossing (though Lindbergh's crossing received much more attention) and eliciting a national outpouring of grief. Newspaper headlines from across the U.S. characterized Kehoe as a maniac, a madman, and a fiend.

People from across the world expressed sympathy to the families and the community of Bath Township, including letters from some Italian schoolchildren. One 5th grade class wrote: "Even if we are small, we understand all the sorrow and misfortune that has struck our dear brothers". Another Italian class wrote: "We are praying to God to give to the unfortunate mothers and fathers, the strength to bear the great sorrow that has descent on them, we are near to you in spirit".

Kehoe's body was claimed by one of his sisters and was buried in an unmarked grave in the pauper's section of Mount Rest Cemetery in St. Johns, Michigan. The Price family buried Nellie Price Kehoe in a Lansing cemetery under her maiden name.

Vehicles from outlying areas and surrounding states descended upon Bath Township by the thousands. Over 100,000 vehicles passed through on Saturday alone, an enormous amount of traffic for the area. Some residents regarded this as an unwarranted intrusion into their time of grief, but most accepted it as a show of sympathy and support from surrounding communities. Burials of individual victims started that Friday, two days after the disaster. Funerals and burials continued on Saturday and Sunday until all the dead were buried. For a time following the tragedy the town and Kehoe's burned-out farm continued to attract curiosity seekers.

=== Rebuilding ===
Governor Green quickly called for donations to aid the townspeople and created the Bath Relief Fund with the money supplied by donors, the state, and local governments. People from around the country donated to the fund.

School resumed on September 5, 1927, and, for the 1927–1928 school year, was held in the community hall, township hall, and two retail buildings. Most of the surviving students returned. The board appointed O. M. Brant of Luther, Michigan, to succeed Huyck as superintendent. Lansing architect Warren Holmes donated construction plans, and the school board approved the contracts for a new building on September 14. On September 15, U.S. Senator James J. Couzens presented his personal check for $75,000 (equivalent to $1,390,086 in 2025) to the Bath construction fund to help build the new school.

The board demolished the damaged portion of the school and constructed a new wing with the donated funds. During the reconstruction dynamite was found in the building on three separate occasions. The James Couzens Agricultural School was dedicated on August 18, 1928. The Kehoe farm was completely plowed to ensure that no explosives were hidden in the ground and was sold at auction to pay the mortgage.

== Coroner's inquest ==
The coroner arrived at the scene on the day of the disaster and swore in six community leaders that afternoon to serve as a jury investigating the death of Superintendent Huyck. Informal testimony had been taken on May 19 and the formal coroner's inquest started on May 23. The Clinton County prosecutor conducted the examination, and more than 50 people testified before the jury. During his testimony, David Hart stated that Kehoe had told him that he had "killed a horse" and The New York Times reported people as saying that Kehoe had "an ungovernable temper" and "seemed to have a mania for killing things". Neighbors testified that he had been wiring the buildings at his farm about that time and that he was evasive about his reasons.

Kehoe's neighbor Sidney J. Howell testified that after the fire began at the Kehoe farm, Kehoe warned him and three men to leave there, saying, "Boys, you are my friends, you better get out of here, you better go down to the school." Three telephone linemen working near Bath Township testified that Kehoe passed them in his truck on the road toward the school, and they saw him arrive there. His truck swerved and stopped in front of the building. In the next instant, according to the linemen, the truck blew up, and one of them was struck by shrapnel. Other witnesses testified that Kehoe paused after stopping, calling Huyck over to the truck and that the two men struggled before Kehoe's truck was blown up.

Although there was never any doubt that Kehoe was the perpetrator, the jury was asked to determine if the school board or its employees were guilty of criminal negligence. After more than a week of testimony, the jury exonerated the school board and its employees. In its verdict, the jury concluded that Kehoe "conducted himself sanely and so concealed his operations that there was no cause to suspect any of his actions; and we further find that the school board, and Frank Smith, janitor of the school building, were not negligent in and about their duties, and were not guilty of any negligence in not discovering Kehoe's plan."

The inquest determined that Kehoe murdered Huyck on the morning of May 18. It was also the jury's verdict that the school was blown up as part of a plan and that Kehoe alone, without the aid of conspirators, murdered 43 people in total, including his wife Nellie. Suicide was determined to be the cause of Kehoe's death, which brought the total number of dead to 44 at the time of the inquest.

On August 22, three months after the bombing, fourth-grader Beatrice Gibbs died following hip surgery. Hers was the 45th and final death directly attributable to the Bath School disaster, which made the event the deadliest attack ever to occur in an American school to date. Richard Fritz, whose older sister Marjorie was killed in the explosion, might have been injured at Bath School. He died almost one year later of myocarditis at the age of eight. Richard is not included on most lists of the victims, but one theory holds that his death from myocarditis is because of an infection from his injuries.

== Legacy ==
Artist Carleton W. Angell presented the board with a memorial statue in 1928 entitled Girl with a Cat (also known colloquially as Girl with a Kitten). The Bath School Museum in the school district's middle school contains many items connected with the disaster, including the statue.

In 1975, the Couzens building was demolished and the site was redeveloped as the James Couzens Memorial Park, dedicated to the victims. At the center of the park is the Bath Consolidated School's original cupola, which survived the disaster and remained on the school until the Couzens building was torn down. After some debate, a Michigan State Historical Marker was installed at the park in 1991 by the Michigan Historical Commission. In 2002 a bronze plaque bearing the names of those killed in the disaster was placed on a large stone near the entrance of the park.

On November 3, 2008, the town announced that tombstones had been donated for Emilie and Robert Bromundt, the last bombing victims whose graves remained unmarked. A grant from a foundation paid for the grave markers. In September 2014, a gravestone was installed at the grave of Richard A. Fritz, whose death in 1928 was possibly caused by injuries sustained in the explosion.

A documentary on the disaster was released in 2011, including interviews with various survivors which had been taped starting in 2004. May 18, 2017, the disaster's 90th anniversary, was marked with a panel discussion at the Bath Middle School. On May 1, 2022, weeks short of the disaster's 95th anniversary, Irene Dunham, the last Bath School student from the time of the disaster, died at age 114.

The disaster is regarded by some as an act of terrorism. Arnie Bernstein, author of Bath Massacre: America's First School Bombing said that it "resonates powerfully for modern readers and reminds us that domestic terrorism and mass murder are sadly not just a product of our times". Medical experts writing in Journal of Surgical Research characterized the disaster as "the largest pediatric terrorist disaster in U.S. history". Harold Schechter, who wrote Psycho USA and Maniac, called the disaster "a horrendous act of terrorist mass murder".

Michigan state historic site marker

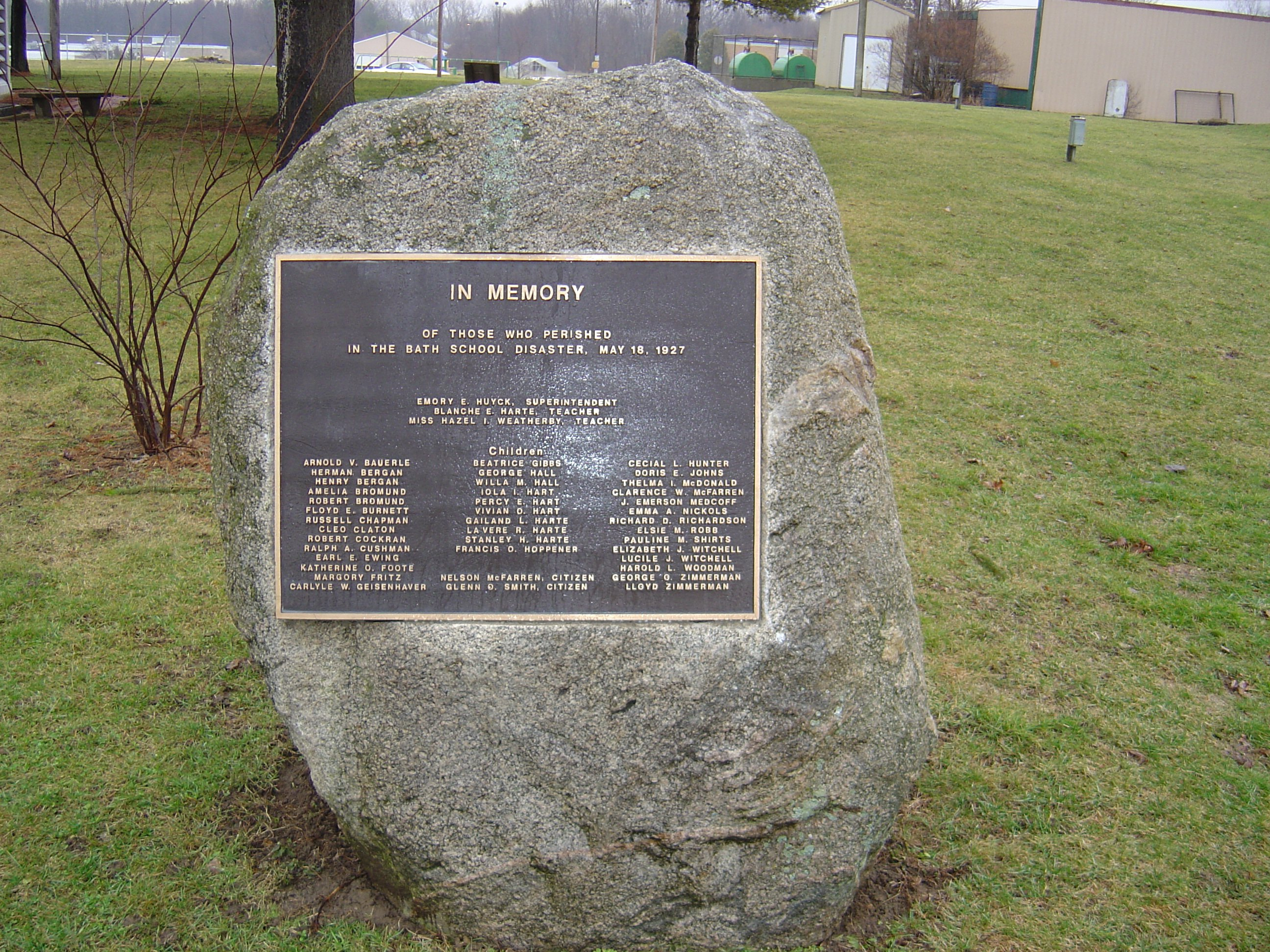
Plaque at the entrance of James Couzens Memorial Park

Cupola from the school building, displayed at James Couzens Memorial Park

== See also ==
- List of homicides in Michigan
- List of rampage killers (school massacres)
- List of school-related attacks
- List of attacks related to primary schools
- List of attacks related to secondary schools
