= Bath, Michigan =

- Census-designated place (CDP) & unincorporated community
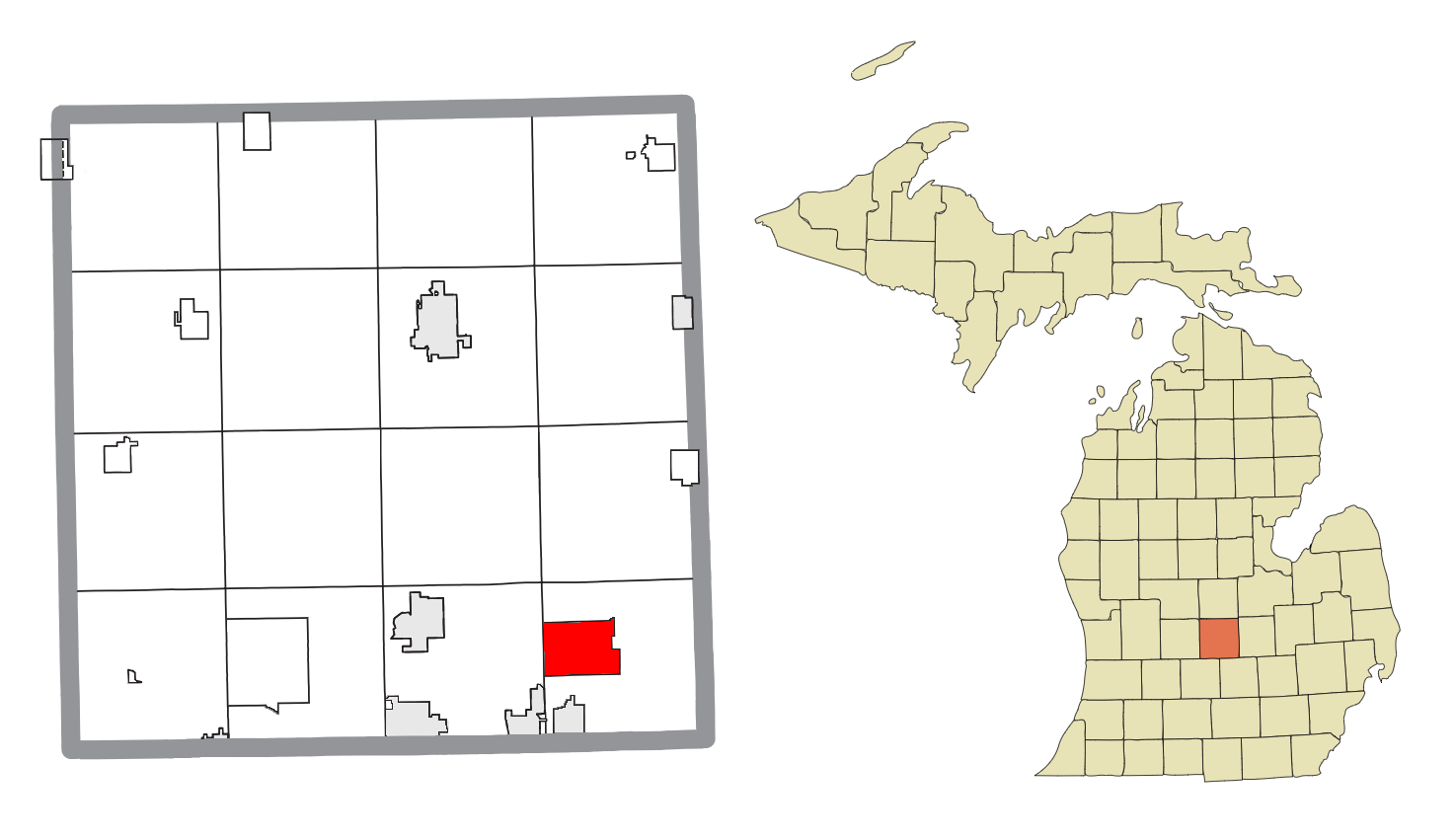
- Location within Clinton County

- Location within the state of Michigan Location within the United States
- Coordinates: 42°49′12″N 84°27′16″W
- Country: United States
- State: Michigan
- County: Clinton
- Township: Bath
- Platted: 1864

Area
  - Total: 6.06 sq mi (15.69 km^{2})
  - Land: 5.86 sq mi (15.18 km^{2})
  - Water: 0.20 sq mi (0.52 km^{2})
- Elevation: 824 ft (251 m)

Population (2020)
  - Total: 2,841
  - Density: 484.8/sq mi (187.17/km^{2})
- Time zone: UTC−5 (Eastern (EST))
  - Summer (DST): UTC−4 (EDT)
- ZIP code(s): 48808
- Area code: 517
- FIPS code: 26-05880
- GNIS feature ID: 2583717

Bath is an unincorporated community and census-designated place (CDP) in Clinton County in the U.S. state of Michigan. It is located in Bath Charter Township. As of the 2020 census, the CDP had a population of 2,841.

== History ==
Bath was platted in 1864.

The community of Bath was listed as a newly-organized census-designated place for the 2010 census, meaning it now has officially defined boundaries and population statistics for the first time.

American supercentenarian Irene Dunham was born in Bath.

=== Bath School disaster ===
On May 18, 1927, in what became known as the Bath School disaster, Andrew Kehoe, a farmer and local school board member angry over losing an election for town clerk and under notice for foreclosure, killed his wife, detonated bombs in his house and farm buildings, and at the same time set off a bomb in the consolidated school. He drove to the school in a truck rigged with more explosives, which he detonated next to the school superintendent. In all, Kehoe killed 44 people, 38 of them children, and himself, in the worst school mass murder in U.S. history. Only half of the 1,000 pounds (450 kg) of explosives set under the school went off, probably greatly lowering the death toll. Thirty-eight of the 314 students, three teachers, the superintendent, the postmaster, and a local farmer assisting at the scene were killed. Most of the deceased were students from second to sixth grade. Fifty-eight others were injured.

== Geography ==
According to the U.S. Census Bureau, the CDP has a total area of 5.94 square miles (15.38 km^{2}), of which 5.74 square miles (14.87 km^{2}) is land and 0.20 square miles (0.52 km^{2}) (3.37%) is water.

== Demographics ==
Historical population
| Census | Pop. | Note | %± |
|---|---|---|---|
| 2010 | 2,083 | | — |
| 2020 | 2,841 | | 36.4% |
U.S. Decennial Census

=== 2020 census ===
As of the 2020 census, Bath had a population of 2,841. The median age was 36.1 years. 21.1% of residents were under the age of 18 and 13.9% of residents were 65 years of age or older. For every 100 females there were 91.3 males, and for every 100 females age 18 and over there were 92.1 males age 18 and over.

58.1% of residents lived in urban areas, while 41.9% lived in rural areas.

There were 1,259 households in Bath, of which 24.9% had children under the age of 18 living in them. Of all households, 45.0% were married-couple households, 18.1% were households with a male householder and no spouse or partner present, and 28.1% were households with a female householder and no spouse or partner present. About 31.8% of all households were made up of individuals and 8.8% had someone living alone who was 65 years of age or older.

There were 1,371 housing units, of which 8.2% were vacant. The homeowner vacancy rate was 1.1% and the rental vacancy rate was 12.3%.

Racial composition as of the 2020 census
| Race | Number | Percent |
|---|---|---|
| White | 2,548 | 89.7% |
| Black or African American | 42 | 1.5% |
| American Indian and Alaska Native | 4 | 0.1% |
| Asian | 33 | 1.2% |
| Native Hawaiian and Other Pacific Islander | 0 | 0.0% |
| Some other race | 29 | 1.0% |
| Two or more races | 185 | 6.5% |
| Hispanic or Latino (of any race) | 123 | 4.3% |

== See also ==
- Bath Community Schools, which serves Bath and surrounding areas
