= Metalith =

The Metalith is a prefabricated steel barrier and the name of the product division of Infrastructure Defense Technologies of Belvidere, Illinois, which manufactures the barrier. It is used in perimeter defense against explosive penetration and ramming. It has been deployed by the US Armed Forces in their 21st century wars in Iraq and Afghanistan.

A related product from IDT is the Metalith H_{2}O flood control barrier, a system of prefabricated, interlocking aluminum barriers for flood defense, designed to hold ballast such as sand. Army Corps of Engineers tests have shown they can be assembled 20 times faster than sandbags and faster than any other tested flood control system, with relatively low seepage rates.
