= Andrew Kehoe =

American mass murderer (1872–1927)

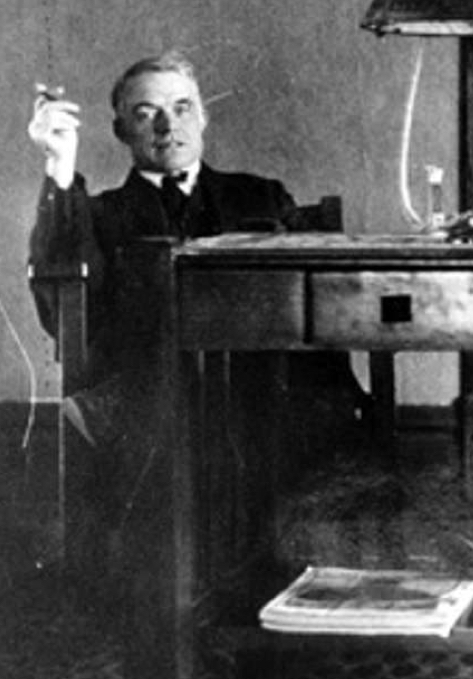
- Kehoe c. 1920
- Born: Andrew Phillip Kehoe; February 1, 1872; Tecumseh, Michigan, U.S.
- Died: May 18, 1927 (aged 55); Bath Township, Michigan, U.S.
- Cause of death: Suicide bombing
- Occupations: Farmer, school board member and treasurer
- Known for: Perpetrator of the Bath School disaster
- Spouse: Ellen Agnes "Nellie" Price (m. 1912; murdered 1927)
- Motive: Inconclusive (Note: Potential motives include: Suicidal ideation; Revenge for perceived social and political slights; Financial difficulties combined with a dangerous injustice collector personality (Note: Mary Ellen O'Toole in her article in the journal Violence and Gender makes a clear distinction between a nonagressive injustice collector and a dangerous injustice collector. "But, in a threat assessment context, being able to distinguish between the nonaggressive injustice collector and the dangerous injustice collector is important. Here is what I believe is the distinction: Dangerous injustice collectors have at least one incident in their past when they reacted to a real or perceived injustice in a manner that was (1) disproportionate to the original event and (2) aggressive."); Possible personality disorders such as antisocial personality disorder)

Details
- Date: May 18, 1927
- Location: Bath Township, Michigan
- Targets: Bath Consolidated School, his house and farm
- Killed: 44 (Note: 38 people were killed in the school bombing, 4 in the truck bombing (excluding Kehoe). He killed his wife at their farm sometime before the mass casualties and a 44th victim initially survived the school bombing but later died in the hospital.)
- Injured: 58
- Weapons: Explosives: Dynamite; Pyrotol; Firebombs; Bolt-action rifle: Winchester Model 54 (.30-06)

Andrew Philip Kehoe (February 1, 1872 – May 18, 1927) was an American mass murderer. Kehoe was a Michigan farmer who became disgruntled after losing an election to be the Bath Township Clerk. (Note: In 1925 Kehoe was appointed temporarily as the Town Clerk, he lost the subsequent election in the spring of 1926. See section on Bath School administration.) He murdered his wife and then detonated bombs at the Bath Consolidated School on May 18, 1927, resulting in the Bath School disaster in which 45 people (Note: 38 children, 6 adults and Kehoe himself.) were killed and 58 more people were injured. After the explosion had destroyed the school building, Kehoe detonated dynamite in his truck, killing himself and several other people and wounding more. He had earlier set off incendiary devices in his house and around his farm, destroying all the buildings. The event remains the deadliest act of mass murder at an American school.

== Early life and education ==
Kehoe was born in Tecumseh, Michigan, among the younger of a family of 13 children. His parents were Philip (1833–1915) and Mary Kehoe (née McGovern) (1835–1890). He attended Tecumseh High School and Michigan State College (later Michigan State University), where he studied electrical engineering. There, he first met his future wife, Ellen "Nellie" Price, the daughter of a wealthy Lansing family.

After college, Kehoe went southwest, apparently working for several years as an electrician in St. Louis, Missouri. During this period, in 1911, he suffered a severe head injury in a fall and was in a coma for two weeks.

Kehoe moved back in with his father after the injury. During Kehoe's time away his mother had died and his father had married Frances Wilder, whom Kehoe did not like. On September 17, 1911, Frances was severely burned when the family's stove exploded as she was attempting to light it. The fuel soaked her, with her body catching fire. Kehoe threw water from a nearby bucket on her; due to the oil-based nature of the fire, the water did nothing to put the flames out. Frances soon died from her injuries, with allegations being made that the stove had been tampered with. (Note: Monty Ellsworth's version of these events in The Bath School Disaster incorrectly differs on one detail—he says that the fire happened when Kehoe was 14 but agrees with other sources on points of fact. He does mention the rumors that the stove was tampered with.)

== Marriage and family ==
After his return to Michigan, in 1912 he married Nellie Price. In 1919 the couple bought a 185-acre (75 ha) farm outside the village of Bath from Nellie's aunt for $12,000 (equivalent to $400,000 in 2025). He paid $6,000 in cash and took out a $6,000 mortgage.

== Personality ==
Kehoe was regarded by his neighbors as a highly intelligent man who grew impatient and angry with those who disagreed with him. Neighbors recalled that Kehoe was always neat, dressed meticulously, and was known to change his shirt at midday or whenever it became even slightly dirty. Neighbors also recounted how Kehoe was cruel to his farm animals, having once beaten a horse to death. The Kehoes initially attended services at the Catholic church in Bath, but he refused to pay the church's parish assessment of members and later prevented his wife from attending.

Kehoe's neighbors thought he preferred mechanical tinkering to farming. His neighbor M. J. "Monty" Ellsworth wrote in his account of the disaster,

He never farmed it as other farmers do and he tried to do everything with his tractor. He was in the height of his glory when fixing machinery or tinkering. He was always trying new methods in his work, for instance, hitching two mowers behind his tractor. This method did not work at different times and he would just leave the hay standing. He also put four sections of drag and two rollers at once behind his tractor. He spent so much time tinkering that he didn't prosper.

Recent analysis identifies Kehoe by the term "dangerous injustice collector": a person who remembers slights and holds a grudge for a long time.

== Bath Consolidated School administration ==
With a reputation for thrift, Kehoe was elected treasurer of the Bath Consolidated School board in 1924. While on the board, Kehoe fought for lower taxes and was often at cross purposes with other board members, voting against them and calling for adjournment when he did not get his way. He repeatedly accused superintendent Emory Huyck of financial mismanagement.

While on the school board, Kehoe was appointed as the Bath Township Clerk in 1925 for a short period. In the spring 1926 election, he was defeated for the position, and was angered by his public defeat. His neighbor Ellsworth thought Kehoe started planning his "murderous revenge" against the community at that time. Another neighbor, A. McMullen, noticed that Kehoe stopped working altogether on his farm in his last year, and thought he might be planning suicide.

During these years, Nellie Kehoe was chronically ill with tuberculosis, and had frequent hospital stays—at the time there was no effective treatment or cure for the disease. By the time of the Bath School disaster, Kehoe had ceased making mortgage and homeowner's insurance payments. The mortgage lender had begun foreclosure proceedings against the farm.

== Bath School disaster ==
The Bath School disaster is the name given to a series of explosions perpetrated by Kehoe on May 18, 1927, in Bath Township, Michigan, which killed 45 people including Kehoe himself, and injured at least 58. Of the 44 directly attributed fatalities, thirty-eight were of children, all aged between 7 and 14 years of age (most under 12 years), attending the second to sixth grades at the Bath Consolidated School. The disaster remains the deadliest act of mass murder in a school in U.S. history.

Kehoe killed his wife sometime between May 16, when she returned home from a hospital stay, and the morning of May 18. He moved her body to a farm building before setting off incendiary explosions in their house and farm buildings. About the same time, he had arranged timed explosions in the new school building. The materials in the north wing exploded as planned, killing many students and some adults inside. Kehoe had set a timed detonator to ignite dynamite and hundreds of pounds of pyrotol at the school, which he had secretly bought and planted in the basement of both wings over the course of many months. The second 500 pounds (230 kg) of explosives in the south wing did not detonate, so that part of the school was not destroyed.

As rescuers started gathering at the school, Kehoe drove up and stopped his truck. During a struggle with Superintendent Huyck, Kehoe detonated dynamite stored inside his shrapnel-filled truck, killing himself and Huyck, as well as killing and injuring several others (among them a boy who had survived the initial bombing). During the rescue efforts, searchers discovered the additional 500 pounds (230 kg) of unexploded dynamite and pyrotol planted throughout the basement of the school's south wing. These explosives, connected to an alarm clock that was supposed to act as the detonator, had been set for the same time as the other explosion.

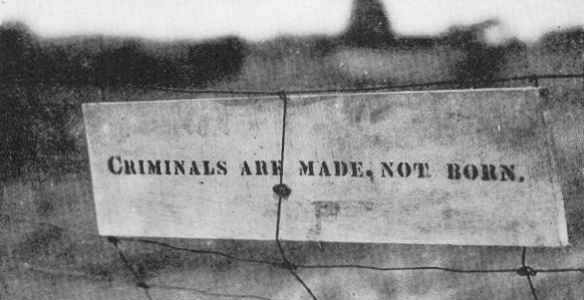
Sign on Andrew Kehoe's fence

After the bombings, investigators found a wooden sign wired to the farm's fence with Kehoe's last message, "Criminals are made, not born", stenciled on it. When investigators were done taking an inventory of the Kehoe estate, they estimated that, prior to its destruction, sale of the unused equipment and materials on the farm would have yielded enough money to pay off the Kehoes' mortgage.

One of Kehoe's sisters claimed his remains and arranged for burial without ceremony in an unmarked grave at Mount Rest Cemetery in St. Johns, Michigan. The Price family claimed Nellie's remains and had her body buried in Lansing, under her maiden name.

== See also ==
- List of school massacres by death toll
