= Journal of Surgical Research =

- Discipline: Surgery
- Language: English
- Edited by: Scott LeMaire

Publication details
- History: 1961-present
- Publisher: Elsevier
- Frequency: 14/year
- Impact factor: 2.187 (2016)

Standard abbreviations
- ISO 4: J. Surg. Res.

Indexing
- CODEN: JSGRA2
- ISSN: 0022-4804 (print); 1095-8673 (web)
- OCLC no.: 716401915

Links
- Journal homepage; Online access; Online archive

The Journal of Surgical Research is a peer-reviewed medical journal covering surgery-related research. It was established in 1961 and is published fourteen times per year by Elsevier on behalf of the Association for Academic Surgery, of which it is the official journal. The editor-in-chief is Scott LeMaire (Baylor College of Medicine). According to the Journal Citation Reports, the journal has a 2016 impact factor of 2.187.
