= Bath Community Schools =

School district in Michigan

Address
- 6175 E. Clark Rd. Bath, Clinton, Michigan, 48808; United States

District information
- Grades: Pre-Kindergarten–12
- Superintendent: Chris Hodges
- Schools: 3
- Budget: $14,042,000 (2021–2022 expenditures)
- NCES District ID: 2604170

Students and staff
- Students: 1,021 (2024–2025)
- Teachers: 56.02 FTE (2024–2025)
- Staff: 99.51 FTE (2024–2025)
- Student–teacher ratio: 18.23 (2024-2025)

Other information
- Website: www.bathschools.net

Bath Community Schools is a public school district in Clinton County, Michigan. It serves parts of Bath Township, DeWitt Township, East Lansing, the part of Olive Township southeast of the Looking Glass River, Victor Township, and Woodhull Township in Shiawassee County.

== History ==
The village of Bath's first school was built in 1858. The school that replaced it, built in 1873, went to grade ten. In 1922, the Bath Consolidated School District formed and a large addition was built on the 1873 school, giving space for all twelve grades.

In 1927, a school board member killed 44 others and himself in an incident known as the Bath School disaster. Most of the school was destroyed by his bombs, and more bombs were discovered during reconstruction of the building. It reopened in 1928 as James Couzens Agricultural School.

A new high school was constructed in 1962. The present high school was built in 1975, when the former high school became a middle school. That year, the Couzens building was demolished and the site became James Couzens Memorial Park.

== Schools ==
- Bath Community High School, 6175 Clark Rd., Bath
- Bath Community Middle School, 13675 Webster Rd., Bath
- Bath Community Elementary School, 13789 Webster Rd., Bath

== Notable Events ==
Jonathan Nugent (2001)

Jonathan W. Nugent, a 1999 Bath High School graduate and accomplished multi-sport athlete who earned 14 varsity letters, died suddenly on May 17, 2001, at age 20 while playing softball at Alma College. Bath Community Schools has honored his memory with an annual track invitational held in his name.

The annual track invitation is still held every year where t-shirts a sold for charity.

Cooper Gardner (2021)

On April 21, 2021, Bath High School junior Cooper Gardner suffered a traumatic brain injury during a junior varsity baseball game against Portland St. Patrick Catholic School after colliding with a base runner while covering second base. Gardner was transported to Sparrow Hospital, where he spent six days in the pediatric intensive care unit before being moved to a regular ward and discharged home. He died unexpectedly on May 2, 2021, while continuing his recovery at home. His death was the first connected to a Michigan school baseball game since sports-related deaths began being tracked in 1989, according to the Michigan High School Athletic Association. The Bath community organized fundraisers and sold #CoopStrong merchandise in his honor.

After his passing, close friends put cups into the fences around the baseball field to spell his name, made sidewalk chalk art, and helped fundraise while sticking together. Baseball players wore the number 17, Coopers Baseball Number, under their eyes in his honor after agreeing to continuing to play, because they knew he'd want them to. They also still sport his number today on tattoos to stickers on their car.

In May 2024, a community member presented a proposal to the Bath Community Schools Board of Education requesting the baseball field be named in Gardner's honor. The Bath Community School Board of Education refused to name the High Schools field in Coopers name.

== See also ==
- Bath School disaster
