= Bath Charter Township, Michigan =

Local government area in Michigan, United States

Bath Township, Michigan
- Charter township
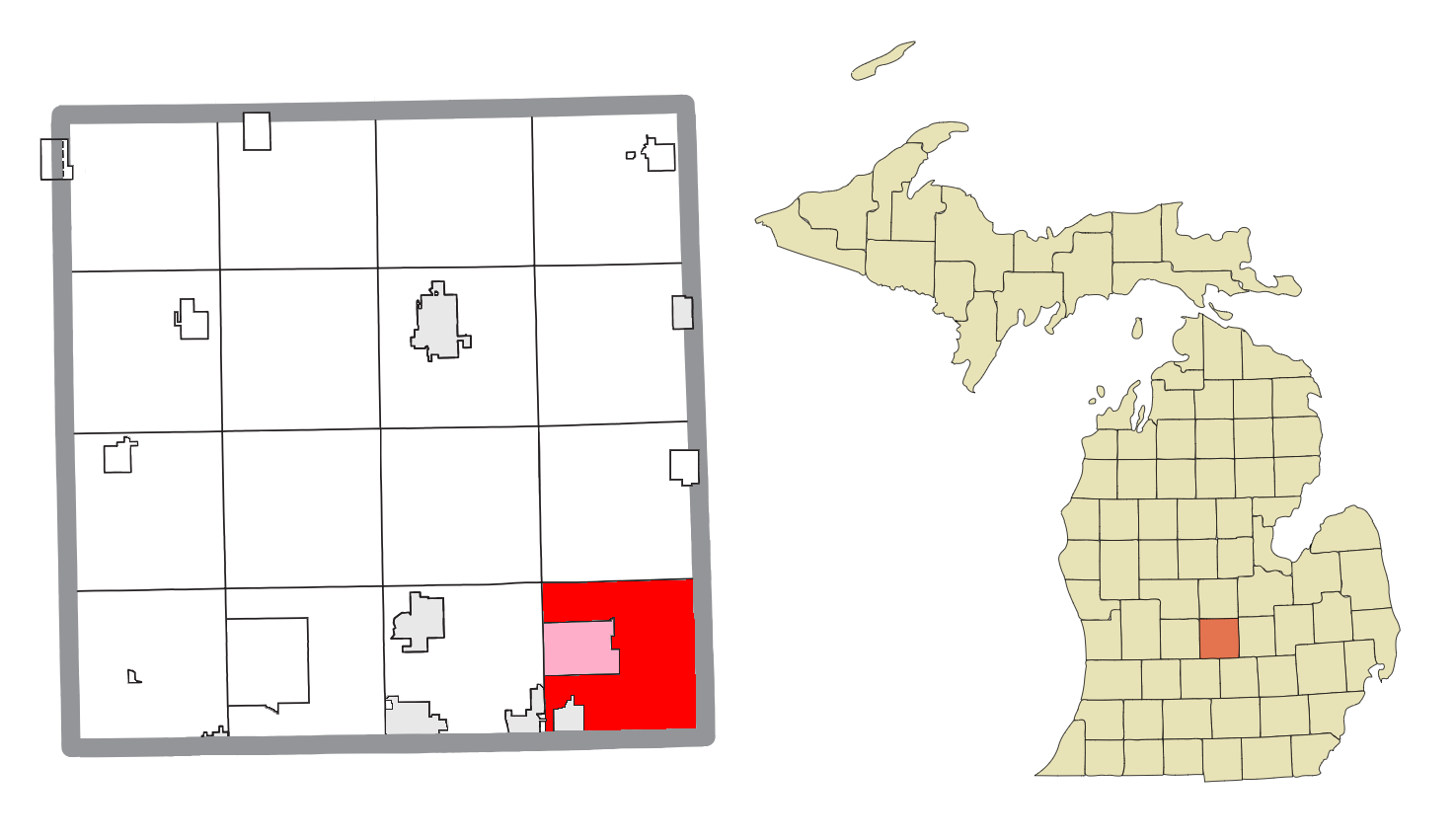
- Location within Clinton County (red) and the administered CDP of Bath (pink)

- Location within the state of Michigan Location within the United States
- Coordinates: 42°48′21″N 84°25′06″W
- Country: United States
- State: Michigan
- County: Clinton
- Established: 1826

Government
  - Supervisor: Ryan Fewins-Bliss
  - Clerk: Brenda Butler-Challender

Area
  - Total: 35.03 sq mi (90.73 km^{2})
  - Land: 32.22 sq mi (83.44 km^{2})
  - Water: 3.20 sq mi (8.29 km^{2})
- Elevation: 856 ft (261 m)

Population (2020)
  - Total: 13,292
  - Density: 412.6/sq mi (159.3/km^{2})
- Time zone: UTC-5 (EST)
  - Summer (DST): UTC-4 (EDT)
- ZIP code(s): 48808 (Bath); 48823 (East Lansing); 48840 (Haslett); 48848 (Laingsburg)
- Area code: 517
- FIPS code: 26-05900
- GNIS feature ID: 1625889
- Website: bathtownship.us

Bath Charter Township is a charter township of Clinton County in the state of Michigan in the U.S. As of the 2020 census, the township population was 13,292, an increase from 11,598 at the 2010 census. It is situated directly north of the city of East Lansing.

== Communities ==
Bath is an unincorporated community and census-designated place located within the western portion of the township.

== History ==
Bath Township was originally organized in 1839 as Ossowa Township, having been split from DeWitt Township by an act of the governor. It was renamed Bath Township in 1843 after Bath, New York.

Park Lake at the southern edge of the township was the source of the Park Lake Trail, an important Native American trailway that intersected the Okemah Trail in what later became the city of East Lansing, Michigan. Park Lake developed into a regional recreation destination for the growing Lansing population after the state capitol relocated to Lansing in 1847. The Michigan Agricultural College was established in East Lansing, Michigan in 1855. By the early 1900s Park Lake was surrounded by summer camps affiliated with various churches and associations as well as seasonal cabins and lodges. The most ambitious of these was the Park Lake Resort which featured a large dance pavilion built on pilings over the water. The Park Lake Dance Pavilion served as an entertainment venue playing host to many famous acts such as Tommy Dorsey until it burned in the 1930s. Years of decline followed and Park Lake never regained its former popularity.

Bath Township was the scene of the Bath School bombing on May 18, 1927, which remains the deadliest act of mass murder in a school in United States history. It claimed more than three times as many victims as the Columbine High School massacre and nearly twice as many victims as the Virginia Tech and the Sandy Hook Elementary School shootings.

== Geography ==
According to the United States Census Bureau, the township has a total area of 35.03 square miles (90.73 km^{2}), of which 31.83 square miles (82.44 km^{2}) is land and 3.20 square miles (8.29 km^{2}) (9.14%) is water.

== Demographics ==
Historical population
| Census | Pop. | Note | %± |
|---|---|---|---|
| 1960 | 3,732 | | — |
| 1970 | 4,832 | | 29.5% |
| 1980 | 5,746 | | 18.9% |
| 1990 | 6,387 | | 11.2% |
| 2000 | 7,541 | | 18.1% |
| 2010 | 11,598 | | 53.8% |
| 2020 | 13,292 | | 14.6% |
U.S. Decennial Census

=== 2010 census ===
At the 2010 census there were 11,598 people in 4,697 households, including 2,596 families, in the township. The population density was 364.3 inhabitants per square mile (140.7/km^{2}). There were 5,106 housing units at an average density of 160.4 per square mile (61.9/km^{2}). The racial makeup of the township was 87.5% White, 5.2% African American, 0.4% Native American, 3.6% Asian, 0.0% Pacific Islander, 1.0% from other races, and 2.3% from two or more races. Hispanic or Latino of any race were 3.4%.

=== 2000 census ===
Of the 2,799 households 37.1% had children under the age of 18 living with them, 60.6% were married couples living together, 9.8% had a female householder with no husband present, and 25.8% were non-families. 19.5% of households were one person and 4.4% were one person aged 65 or older. The average household size was 2.68 and the average family size was 3.10.

The age distribution was 28.2% under the age of 18, 6.8% from 18 to 24, 32.1% from 25 to 44, 25.0% from 45 to 64, and 7.9% 65 or older. The median age was 36 years. For every 100 females, there were 98.4 males. For every 100 females age 18 and over, there were 98.2 males.

The median household income was $53,881 and the median family income was $58,825. Males had a median income of $43,548 versus $31,056 for females. The per capita income for the township was $24,675. About 3.8% of families and 4.5% of the population were below the poverty line, including 3.8% of those under age 18 and 7.8% of those age 65 or over.

== Education ==
School districts serving township residents:

- Bath Community Schools
- East Lansing Public Schools
- Haslett Public Schools
- Laingsburg Community Schools
