= Pyrotol =

Explosive available for a time after World War I

Pyrotol was an explosive available for a time after World War I. It was reprocessed from military surplus, with a typical composition of 60% smokeless powder, 34% sodium nitrate, and 6% of 40% nitroglycerin dynamite. Usually used in combination with dynamite, it created an incendiary blast. Since it was very inexpensive, it was often used by farmers to remove tree stumps and clear ditches. The substance was known for being used to commit the Bath School bombing in 1927. Distribution of pyrotol for farm use was discontinued in 1928, due to exhaustion of the supply of surplus explosives.

Pyrotol was intended to make a use after the war for a large surplus of smokeless powder. It was manufactured in a contract awarded to the DuPont Company and was created in three DuPont plants: Gibbstown, N.J., Barksdale, Wisconsin, and DuPont, Washington. The active ingredient of these cartridges, Pyrotol, was free, and included in the cartridge's price; the consumer paid for the preparation and freight of these cartridges.

Pyrotol was said to cause no ill effects, like headaches, or staining hands or clothing, although the validity of this statement is unknown. A 6-ounce (170 g) cartridge of pyrotol was said to be as powerful as an 8-ounce (230 g) cartridge of dynamite, and came in 50-pound (23 kg) boxes containing 160 cartridges of the substance.
