= Mamajuda Island =

Canadian island

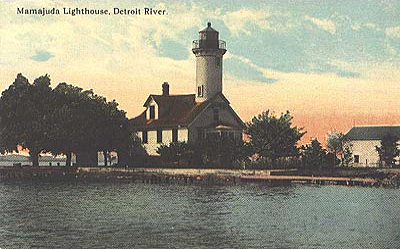
- The Mama Juda Lighthouse from a 1910 postcard

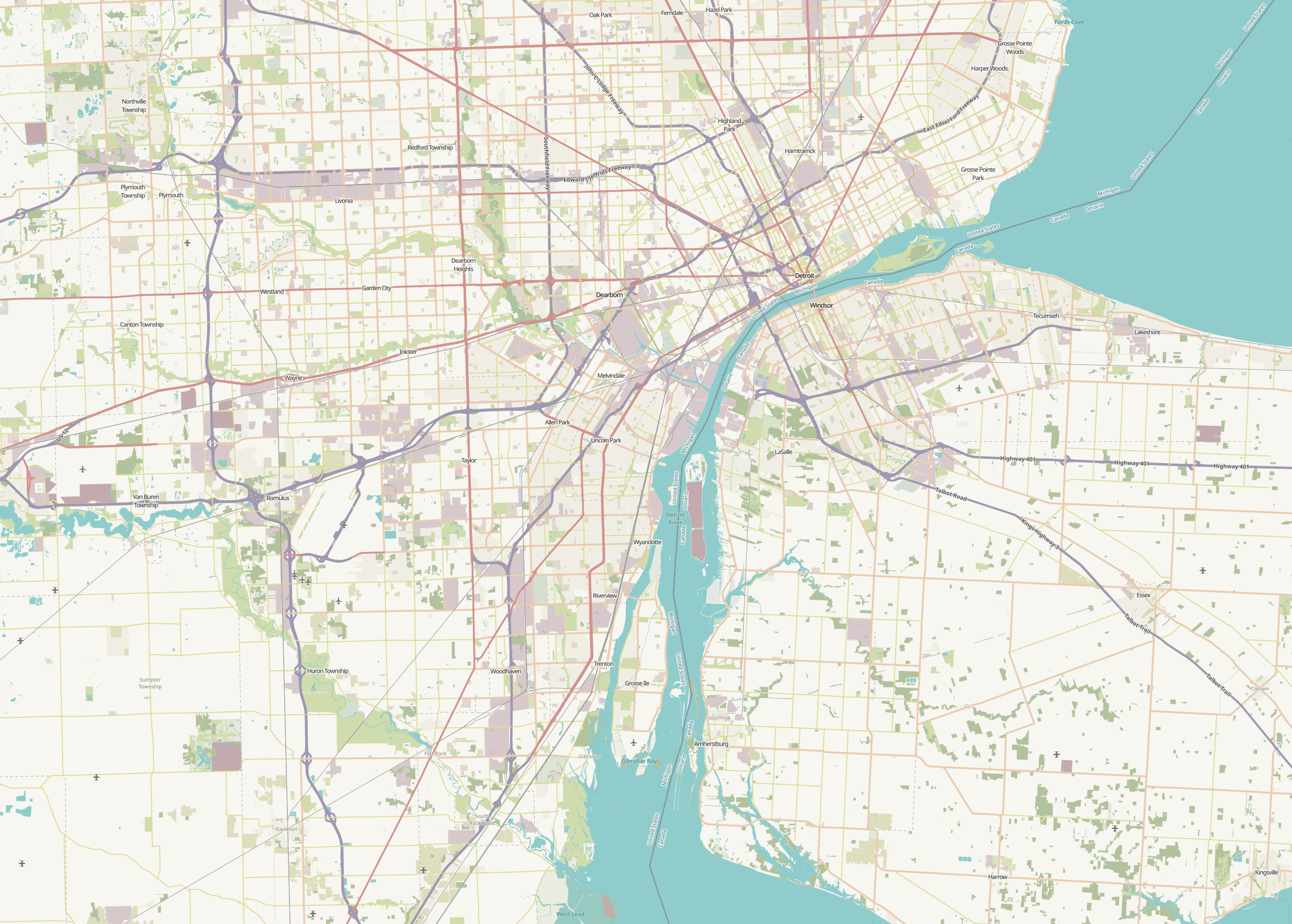
- Location within Wayne County, Michigan Location within Michigan

Geography
- Location: Detroit River
- Coordinates: 42°11′32″N 83°08′10″W

Administration
- United States
- State: Michigan
- County: Wayne County
- Township: Grosse Ile Township

Demographics
- Population: Uninhabited

Mamajuda Island /mɑːməˈdʒuːdə/, sometimes identified as Mama Juda Island, was an American island in the Detroit River. It is located just east of the northern tip of Grosse Ile (Hennepin Point) and about 500 feet (152 m) west of the Canada–United States border. The island is part of Grosse Ile Township in Wayne County, Michigan. It is the smallest of all charted islands in the Detroit River.

The former 30-acre (12 ha) island has since been lost to erosion. Only a very small portion of it, consisting of a few boulders, appears above water during times of low water levels. Because of that, the island has no definitive size and cannot be used for any purposes. The island does not appear on many maps anymore, but it can be seen on some of the most precise online maps. The island is part of the much larger Mamajuda Island Shoal, which runs along the east coast of Grosse Ile. The shoal is about 3–8 feet (0.9–2.4 m) beneath the surface and runs all the way to Grassy Island. The area, including Mamajuda Island, has since become part of the Detroit River International Wildlife Refuge.

The island was originally named after an American Indian woman who regularly camped on the island during fishing season. In 1849, the Mama Juda Lighthouse was built on the island, and the lighthouse keeper and his family were the island's only inhabitants. The lighthouse itself was rebuilt in 1866. However, the loose composition of the island was subject to slow erosion that eventually washed away the lighthouse in 1950. The whole island itself disappeared by 1960, and only a few boulders from the former island periodically protrude above the surface. However, because of the underlying shoal, the area can pose a hazard for boating in the area, especially for large lake freighters that regularly travel within close proximity.
