= Main Island =

Main island is a term for the largest island in a country or group of islands.

Main Island may refer to:

- Grosse Ile (Michigan), an island in Michigan, nicknamed the "Main Island"
- Main Island (Michigan), an island within the state of Michigan
- Main Island, Willis Islands in the South Georgia Islands
- Main Island of Bermuda
- Honshu, Japan
- Singapore Island, Singapore
