= Grosse Ile =

Grosse Ile (French: large island) or Grosse Isle may refer to:

== Places in Canada ==
- Grosse Isle, Quebec, an island where many Irish Immigrants to Canada were housed and the site of the Grosse Isle Disaster
- Grosse-Île, Quebec, one of two municipalities forming the urban agglomeration of Îles-de-la-Madeleine in Quebec, Canada
- Grosse Isle, Manitoba, a small community in Manitoba, Canada

== Places in the United States ==
- Grosse Ile Township, Michigan, United States
  - Grosse Ile (Michigan), the largest island in the township
