= Karmazin =

Karmazin may refer to:

== People ==
- John Karmazin, Sr. (23 May 1884–May 1977) was an American engine component inventor and business founder.
- Mel Karmazin (born August 24, 1943)[1] is an American executive.
- Roman Karmazin (born January 2, 1973, in Kuznetsk) is the former IBF Light Middleweight champion of the world.
- Viliam Karmažin (1922-2018), Slovak composer and conductor

== Enterprises ==
- The Karmazin Products Corporation was founded in Wyandotte, Michigan during 1946 by John Karmazin, Sr.

== Other use ==
- Karmazin (grape), another name for the red wine grape Blaufrankisch
