= Sugar Island (Detroit River) =

Island in the Detroit River, Michigan, U.S.

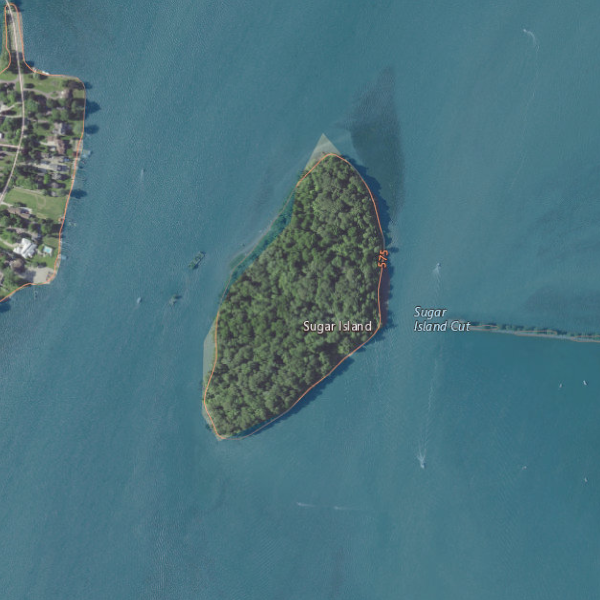
- USGS aerial imagery of Sugar Island

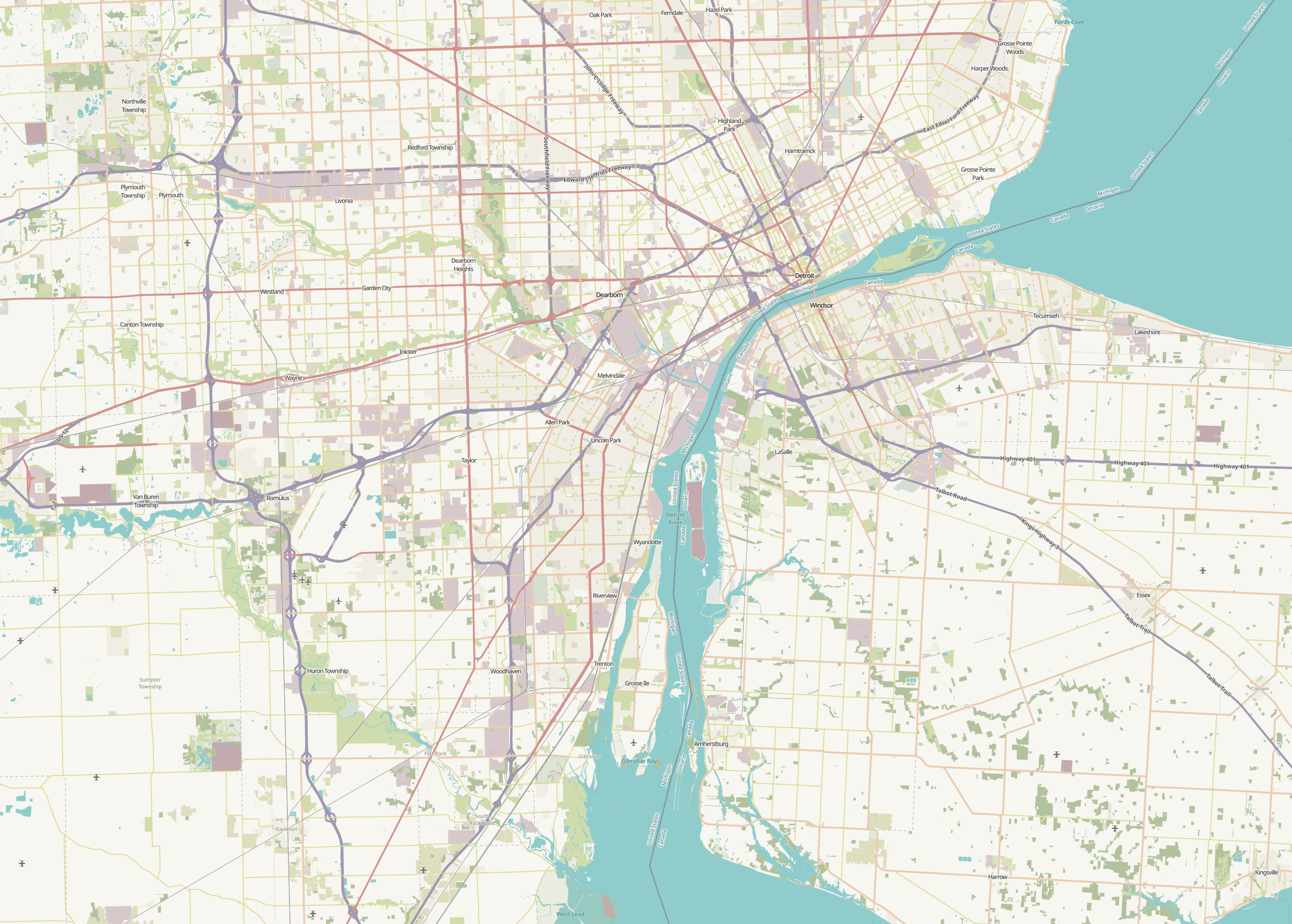
- Location within Wayne County, Michigan Location within Michigan

Geography
- Location: Detroit River
- Coordinates: 42°05′29″N 83°08′39″W
- Area: 30 acres (12 ha)

Administration
- United States
- State: Michigan
- County: Wayne County
- Township: Grosse Ile Township

Demographics
- Population: Uninhabited

Sugar Island is a small island in the Detroit River between Grosse Ile and Boblo Island. Sugar Island is part of Grosse Ile Township, Wayne County, Michigan, United States, and lies about 0.5 miles (0.80 km) west of the border with Canada. Currently the island is uninhabited and was recently converted to a wildlife refuge by the US Fish and Wildlife service (see below). The majority of the island is wooded and it is known for its white sandy beaches and easy access by boat.

In the early part of the 20th century (c. 1900-1940), Sugar Island was the site of a resort park and large dance pavilion. Access to the island was by steam ferry, including the SS Tashmoo. Tashmoo met her fate on the night of June 18, 1936 while departing Sugar Island she struck a rock. She was able to land her passengers in Amherstburg, Ontario before sinking.

For many years Sugar island was held in private ownership with plans to build a bridge and residential housing on the island. There were objections to this plan, mainly by environmental groups, as the island is a resting point for many species of migratory birds. The island was recently purchased by the US Fish and Wildlife service for $434,100 and will be made into a wildlife refuge.

== See also ==
- Harsens Island
- Peche Island
- Boblo Island
