= List of islands in the Detroit River =

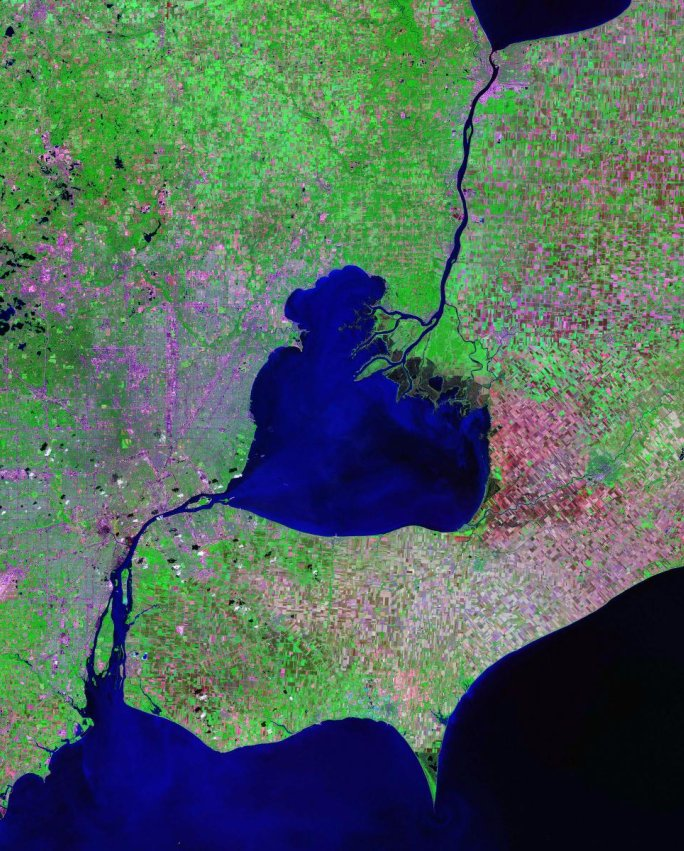
Landsat satellite photo showing the Detroit River flowing south from Lake St. Clair to Lake Erie.

The following is a description of islands in the Detroit River. The Detroit River is a major waterway in the Great Lakes system, and it flows for 24 nautical miles (44 km; 28 mi) from Lake St. Clair south to Lake Erie. The river serves as a major shipping channel, jointly controlled by the United States and Canada, and it is a major component of the Canada–United States border. The majority of islands are on the American side of the river, which are all within Wayne County in Michigan. The Canadian islands are part of Essex County in Ontario. There are no islands in the Detroit River that are divided by the international border, as Michigan and Ontario share no land borders at any point.

Most of the islands are very small and uninhabited, and many of these islands around the southern portion of the river serve as nature reserves as part of the Detroit River International Wildlife Refuge. The largest and most populated island is Grosse Ile, and many islands are part of Grosse Ile Township. Several islands were also artificially created by canals, such as several islands within the city of Gibraltar, as well as Elizabeth Park and Zug Island.

== Michigan ==
=== Belle Isle ===
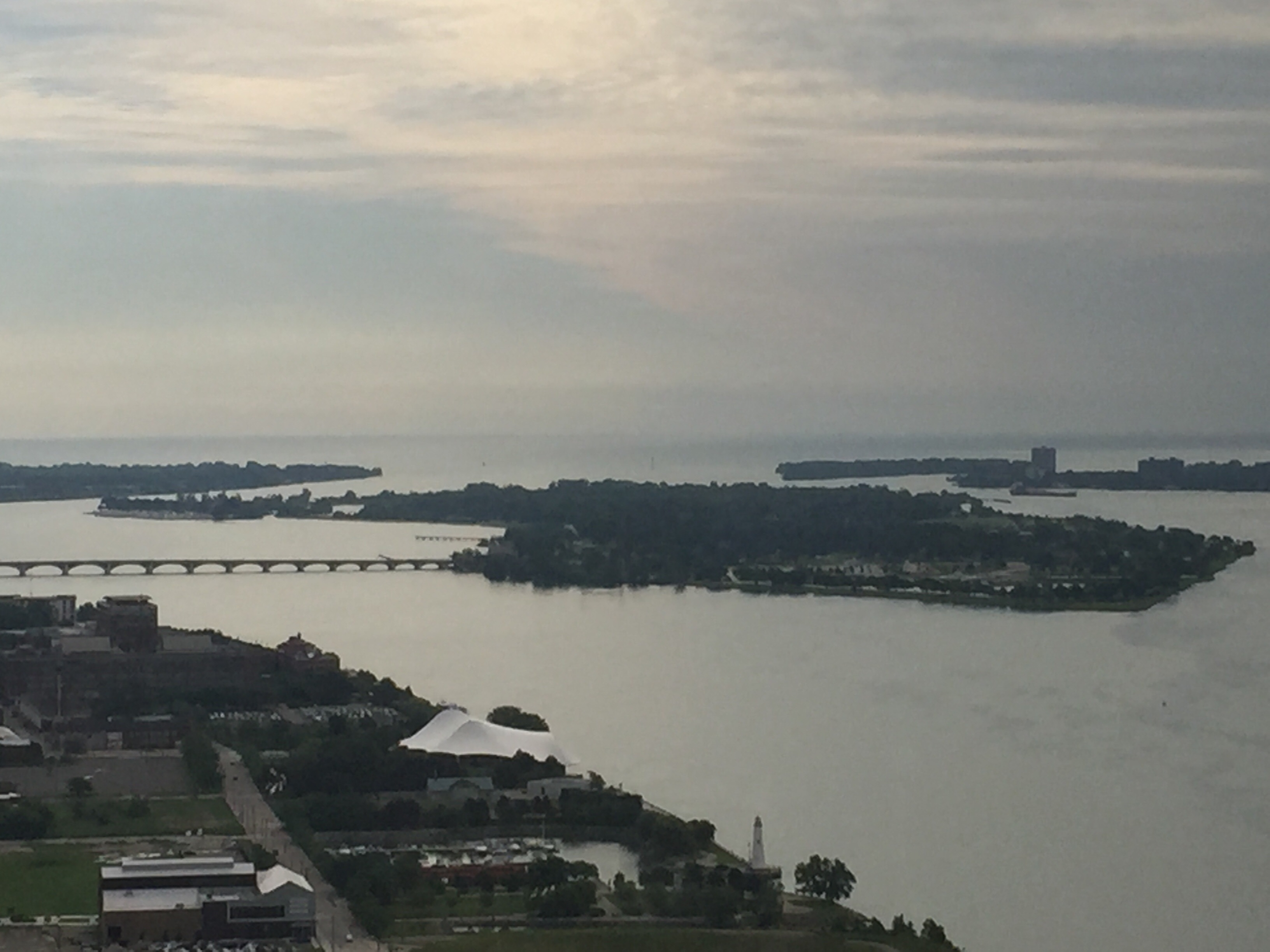
Aerial view of Belle Isle looking east

Belle Isle (42°20′35″N 82°58′28″W) is a 982-acre (3.97 km^{2}) island in the northeastern portion of the Detroit River just north of Downtown Detroit. Belle Isle sits at an elevation of 574 feet (175 m) above sea level, and the island has also gone by several historic names. It is the northernmost island in the river just downstream from Lake St. Clair. Because of the curve in the river, Belle Isle is just west of (Southbound on the river) the Canadian Peche Island, which is the easternmost and first island in the river heading South. It is the third-largest island in the river after Grosse Ile and Fighting Island. The island is within the city limits of Detroit but is administered by the Michigan Department of Natural Resources, as the island was designated as a state park named Belle Isle Park in 2014. The island is connected to the mainland by the MacArthur Bridge, which carries East Grand Boulevard and connects to East Jefferson Avenue. Belle Isle has no permanent population.

The island is a very popular tourist destination that contains a number of historic structures and events. The entire island is listed as a historic district on the National Register of Historic Places and also as a Michigan State Historic Site. The island itself also contains several lakes, including the Blue Heron Lagoon, Lake Muskoday, Lake Okonoda, Lake Takoma, and several artificial canals. These lakes also contain several unnamed recursive islands (islands within an island).

=== Calf Island ===
Calf Island (42°06′11″N 83°10′45″W) is an 11-acre (4.5 ha) island off the southwest coast of Grosse Ile. The island sits at an elevation of 571 feet (174 m) above sea level. The island, which is within Grosse Ile Township, is uninhabited and serves primarily as a nesting location for migrating birds. In 2002, Calf Island became part of the Detroit River International Wildlife Refuge.

=== Celeron Island ===
Celeron Island (42°04′51″N 83°10′27″W) is a 68-acre (27.5 ha) island near the mouth of the Detroit River at Lake Erie. Celeron Island is the southernmost island within Grosse Ile Township and sits at an elevation of 571 feet (174 m) above sea level. Due to erosion, it now comprises two separate islands. Celeron Island is uninhabited and administered by the Michigan Department of Natural Resources, as the island was included into Pointe Mouillee State Game Area in 1976.

=== Cherry Island ===
Cherry Island (42°04′50″N 83°11′41″W) is an uninhabited island within Brownstown Charter Township just south of the city of Gibraltar. Also referred to as Cherry Isle, the island sits at an elevation of 574 feet (175 m) above sea level. The island is part of Lake Erie Metropark and contains the park's boat launch. Cherry Island is also listed by the GNIS as an unincorporated community and populated place.

=== Edmond Island ===
Edmond Island (42°05′01″N 83°11′41″W) is an artificial island within the city of Gibraltar. It separated from the mainland by a narrow canal and is connected to the mainland by a single bridge that carries Young Drive. The island sits at an elevation of 577 feet (176 m) above sea level. It is one of the main populated islands of Gibraltar, and it is sometimes spelled as Edmund Island.

=== Elba Island ===
Elba Island (42°06′09″N 83°08′51″W) is an elongated island off the southeast coast of Grosse Ile and is administered by Grosse Ile Township. It is separated from Grosse Ile by the Oldani Marsh. Elba Island contains a single roadway and is connected by a single bridge to Grosse Ile. The island sits at an elevation of 591 feet (180 m) above sea level.

=== Elizabeth Park ===
Elizabeth Park (42°07′56″N 83°10′49″W) is an artificial island within the city of Trenton. The island is located on the western shores of the Trenton Channel and sits at an elevation of 591 feet (180 m) above sea level. Once connected to the mainland, it was set off by the construction of a canal by landowner Giles Bryan Slocum in the mid-nineteenth century. The island became known as Slocum's Island, and the property was donated to the county in 1918. The Slocum's Island name has now largely fallen into disuse. Today, the island encompasses the 162-acre (65.6 ha) Elizabeth Park on the northern end and the Trenton Channel Power Plant on the south. The two are separated by the Grosse Ile Parkway, which carries the Wayne County Bridge leading to Grosse Ile.

=== Fox Island ===
Fox Island (42°06′22″N 83°08′29″W) is a small and uninhabited island located off the southeast coast of Grosse Ile just east of Elba Island. The island is privately owned and part of Grosse Ile Township. The island sits at an elevation of 587 feet (179 m) above sea level.

=== Grassy Island ===
Grassy Island (42°13′21″N 83°08′05″W) is a 72-acre (29.1 ha) island just north of Grosse Ile and west of Fighting Island. The uninhabited island is part of the city of Wyandotte. Originally, the island was much smaller, but it served as a disposal facility for millions of cubic yards of sediments that were dredged from the expanding of the River Rouge. In 2001, Grassy Island was an inaugural addition to the Detroit River International Wildlife Refuge, although access to the island is restricted and difficult.

Grassy Island sits at an elevation of 574 feet (175 m). It once contained the former Grassy Island Light. Grassy Island should not be confused with another island on the opposite side of the river named Grass Island, which is part of Ontario.

=== Grosse Ile ===
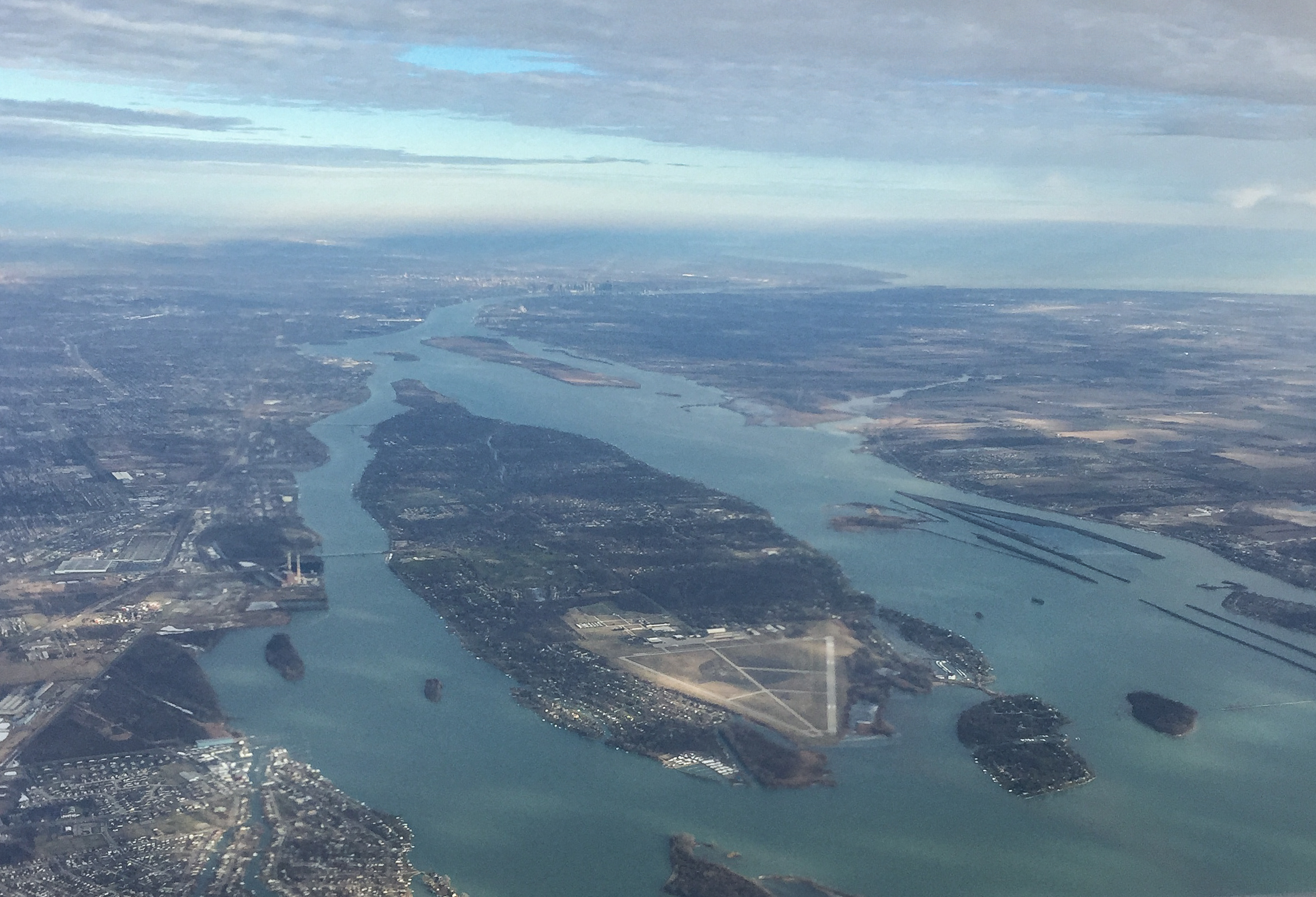
Aerial view of the island of Grosse Ile

Grosse Ile (42°07′36″N 83°09′33″W) is the largest island in the Detroit River. The island sits at an elevation of 574 feet (175 m) above sea level in the southern portion of the river. The island itself has no precise area or population statistics, although it is approximately 10 miles (16.1 km) long and 1.0 mile (1.6 km) wide. Grosse Ile is the main island within Grosse Ile Township, and it is often referred to as the "big island" or "main island" to distinguish it from the township as a whole, which contains a dozen individual islands.

Grosse Ile connects to the mainland by the Wayne County Bridge in the middle of the island and the Grosse Ile Toll Bridge on the northern end. The Grosse Ile Municipal Airport is located on the southern end of the island. The island also contains a number of smaller bridges that traverse the island's canals and connect to the smaller islands to the south. Grosse Ile contains numerous historic structures and is primarily residential with little economic development. The island is bisected by the Thorofare Canal and another canal that separates the undeveloped northern portion of the island referred to as Hennepin Point. The 40-acre (16.2 ha) Gibraltar Bay Unit of the Detroit River International Wildlife Refuge is located in the southeast portion of the island.

=== Hall Island ===
Hall Island (42°05′18″N 83°11′36″W) is an inhabited island within the city of Gibraltar. It is centrally located within the city just east of Main Island and north of Edmond Island. It is connected to the mainland and Main Island by two bridges along Stoeflet Street.

=== Humbug Island ===
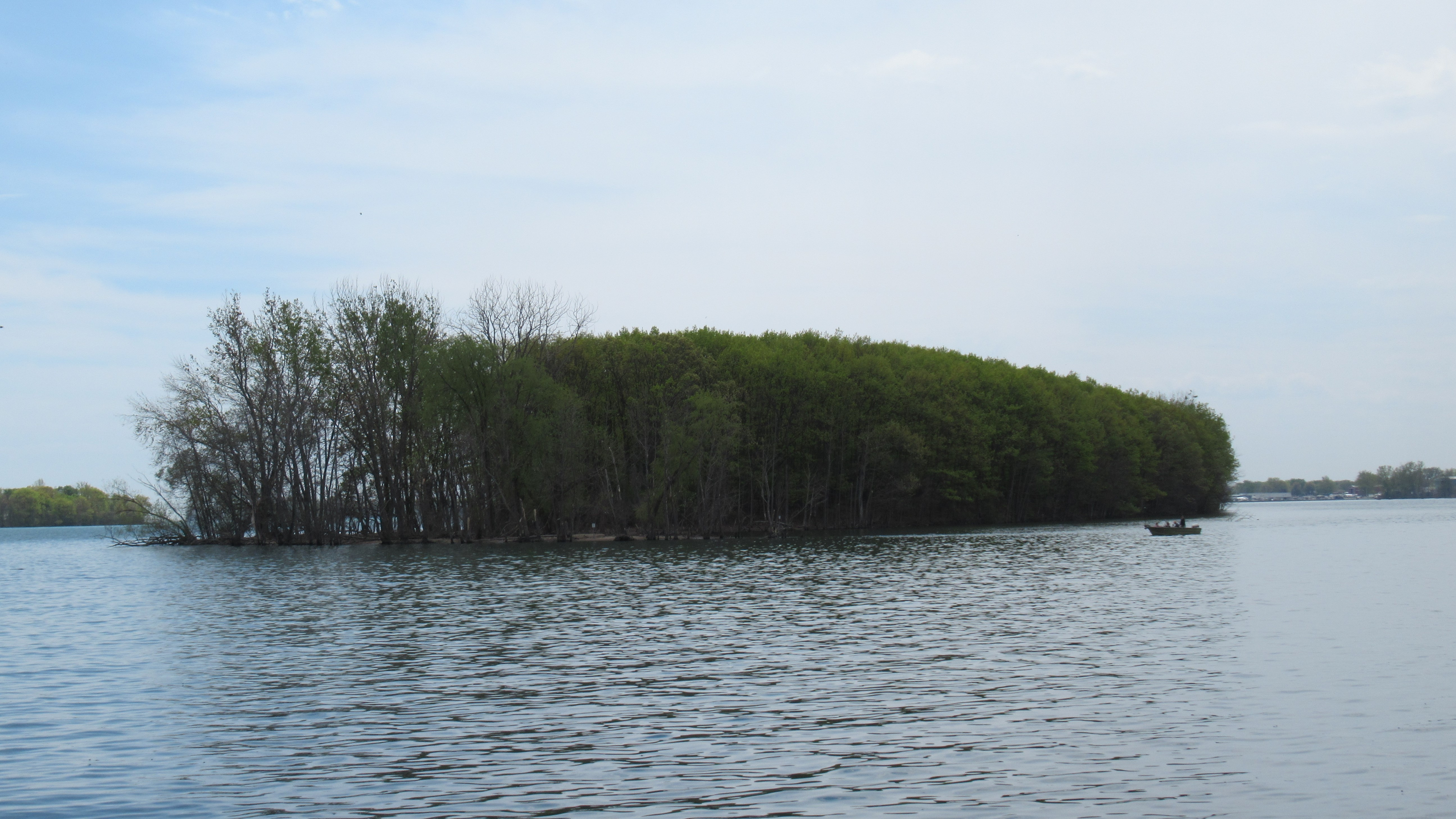
Humbug Island

Humbug Island (42°06′32″N 83°11′06″W) is an elongated island within the city of Gibraltar just northwest of Calf Island. It is included in the much larger 410-acre (1.66 km^{2}) Humbug Marsh, which was included into the Detroit River International Wildlife Refuge in 2004. The island is uninhabited and inaccessible, and it is noted as the last undeveloped shoreline on the American side of the Detroit River.

=== Hickory Island ===
Hickory Island (42°05′18″N 83°09′18″W) is the southernmost populated island within Grosse Ile Township. It sits at an elevation of 581 feet (177 m) above sea level. The island contains a single bridge connecting to Meso Island to the north leading to Grosse Ile. The Grosse Ile Yacht Club is located on Hickory Island.

=== Horse Island ===
Horse Island (42°04′55″N 83°11′08″W) is a narrow and elongated island within the city of Gibraltar. It is the city's southeasternmost island and sits at an elevation of 571 feet (174 m) above sea level. The island is densely populated and contains a single roadway. It is connected to the mainland by the Horse Island Drive Bridge, which is 46 feet (14 m) long and was constructed in 1925. The island received its name from early settlers who would leave their horses to feed and mate on the island during the summer months.

=== Main Island ===
Main Island (42°05′21″N 83°11′19″W) is the largest and most-populated island within the city of Gibraltar. It is separated from the mainland by a narrow canal. The island is connected to the mainland at the north end by the historic Gibraltar Road–Waterway Canal Bridge, which is 52 feet (16 m) long and was constructed in 1932. Main Island also connects to Hall Island to the west via Stoflet Street, as well as connecting to Horse Island to the southeast via Island Drive.

=== Mamajuda Island ===
Mamajuda Island (42°11′32″N 83°08′10″W) was an island located just east of the northern tip of Grosse Ile (Hennepin Point) within Grosse Ile Township. The island was once 30 acres (12.1 ha) in size and contained the historic Mama Juda Lighthouse, which was first built in 1849. The lighthouse was lost by increased erosion in the 1950s, and the entire island itself disappeared soon after. The island was also known as Mammy Juda Island and sits at an elevation of 574 feet (175 m) above sea level. Although the island is gone, it is still listed on some online maps and may surface during times of low water levels.

=== Meso Island ===
Meso Island (42°05′35″N 83°09′06″W) is a populated island in southeast Grosse Ile Township. The island sits at an elevation of 584 feet (178 m) above sea level. Hickory Island is to the south, and Meso Island connects to Grosse Ile by a single bridge. Sugar Island is just east of Meso Island.

=== Mud Island ===
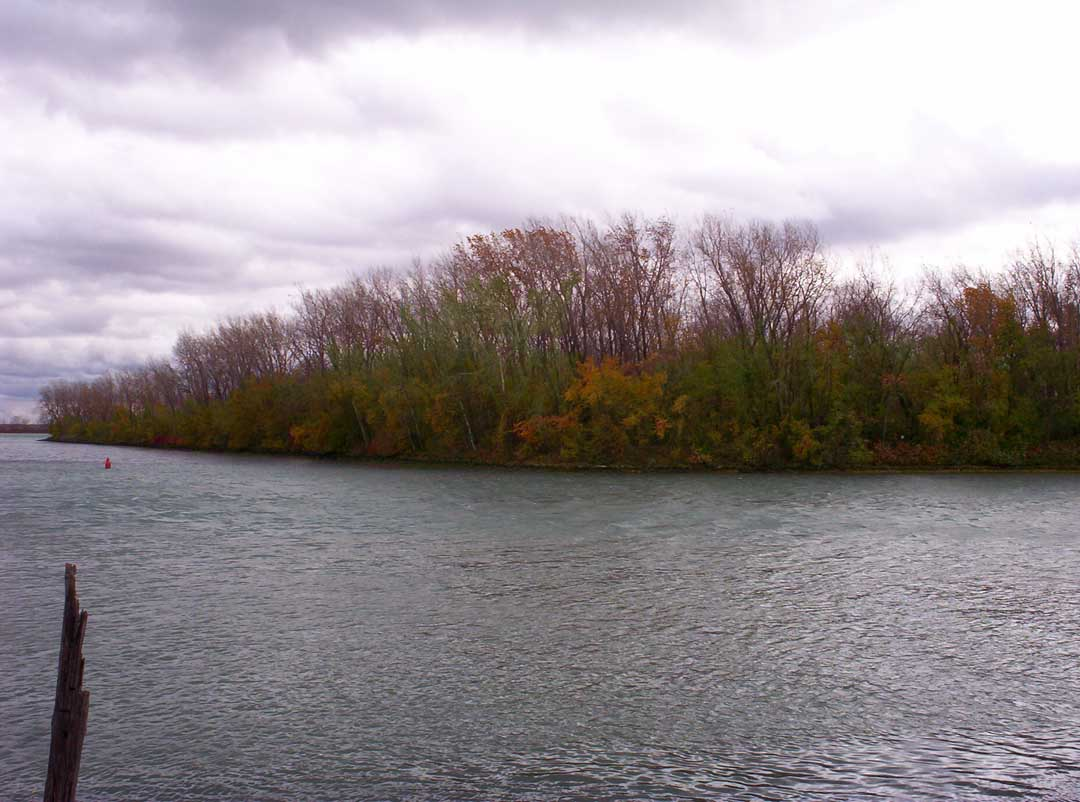
View of Mud Island from John D. Dingell Park in Ecorse

Mud Island (42°14′19″N 83°08′24″W) is a 21-acre (8.5 ha) island within the city of Ecorse. The island was donated by the National Steel Corporation and is the northernmost unit included in the Detroit River International Wildlife Refuge. Mud Island is just north of Grassy Island, and public access to the island is prohibited. It sits at an elevation of 584 feet (178 m) above sea level.

=== Powder House Island ===
Powder House Island (42°06′26″N 83°08′08″W) is a very small uninhabited island in southeast Grosse Ile Township. It is located just northeast of Fox Island in the middle of the river near the international border. Powder House Island sits at an elevation of 574 feet (175 m) above sea level. The island may also be referred to as Dynamite Island.

=== Round Island ===
Round Island (42°05′32″N 83°10′01″W) is an uninhabited island of Grosse Ile Township. It sits at an elevation of 581 feet (177 m) above sea level. Unlike other islands at the southern tip of Grosse Ile, Round Island is undeveloped. It is separated from Grosse Ile by a narrow canal that is used for docking boats at the Ford Yacht Club.

=== Stony Island ===
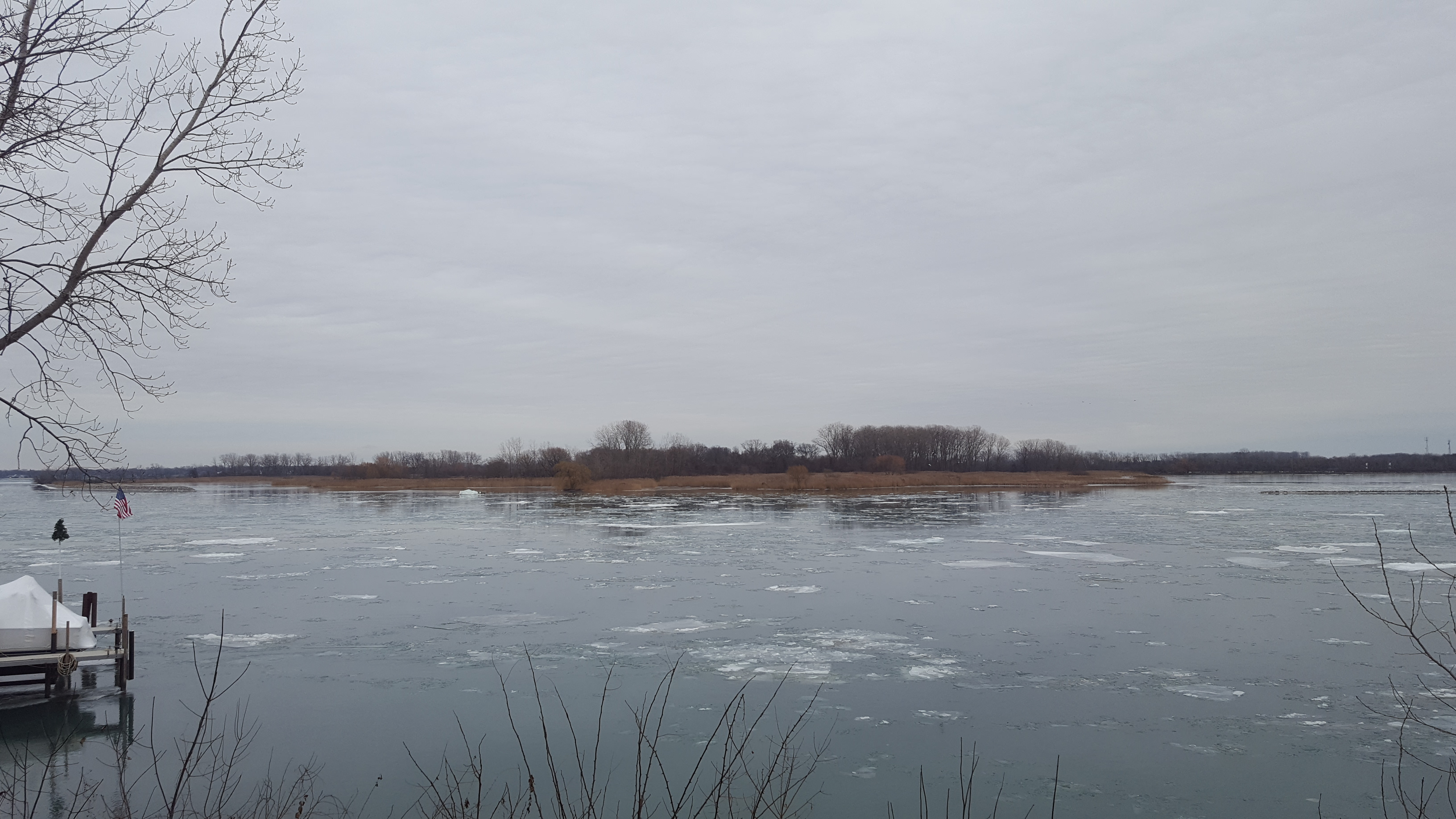
View of Stony Island from Grosse Ile

Stony Island (42°07′41″N 83°07′51″W) is 52-acre (21.0 ha) uninhabited island within Grosse Ile Township just east of Grosse Ile and west of the international border from Crystal Island. Stony Island sits at an elevation of 577 feet (176 m) above sea level. The island's unusual shape and stony composition are the result of millions of cubic yards of sediment that were dredged out of the middle of the Detroit River to provide a deep shipping lane. The island has also been reinforced and surrounded by numerous breakwater structures to protect the artificial wetlands. The island has undergone this restoration project with funding from the National Oceanic and Atmospheric Administration. Most of the island is included as part of Pointe Mouillee State Game Area.

=== Sturgeon Bar ===
Sturgeon Bar (42°04′06″N 83°11′19″W), sometimes listed as Sturgeon Bar Island, is the southernmost island in the Detroit River and is part of Brownstown Charter Township. The island sits at an elevation of 571 feet (174 m) above sea level. Sturgeon Bar is part of the Lake Erie Metropark, and the Metropark is also included as a unit within the Detroit River International Wildlife Refuge.

=== Sugar Island ===
Sugar Island (42°05′29″N 83°08′39″W) is an uninhabited 29-acre (11.7 ha) island off the southwest coast of Grosse Ile within Grosse Ile Township. It is just east of Meso Island near the international border. The island sits at an elevation of 587 feet (179 m) above sea level.

Beginning in the 1880s, Sugar Island became a popular resort location, and it eventually contained an amusement park and other entertainment venues. Ferry services brought guest to and from the island until the 1940s when the amusement park closed. The island soon fell into disuse and ruins. In 2012, the deserted island was purchased by the United States Fish and Wildlife Service and soon after included as a unit in the Detroit River International Wildlife Refuge. The island contains no structures, and access to the island is restricted.

=== Swan Island ===
Swan Island (42°05′57″N 83°10′26″W) is the smallest of the inhabited islands of Grosse Ile Township. Swan Island is located southwest of Grosse Ile, and it is separated by a narrow canal and connected by a single bridge. The island sits at an elevation of 581 feet (177 m) above sea level.

=== Zug Island ===
Zug Island (42°17′02″N 83°06′43″W) is a 334-acre (1.35 km^{2}) island in the city of River Rouge just south of the city of Detroit. It sits at an elevation of 581 feet (177 m) above sea level. Zug Island is an artificial island that was once connected to the mainland at the mouth of the River Rouge, but its original landowner had a small canal created to set the land off as an island. In 1902, the island became site of several steel mills during the age of rapid industrial development along the Detroit River. Today, Zug Island houses a large steel mill owned by U.S. Steel, and public access is strictly prohibited.

== Ontario ==
=== Bois Blanc Island ===
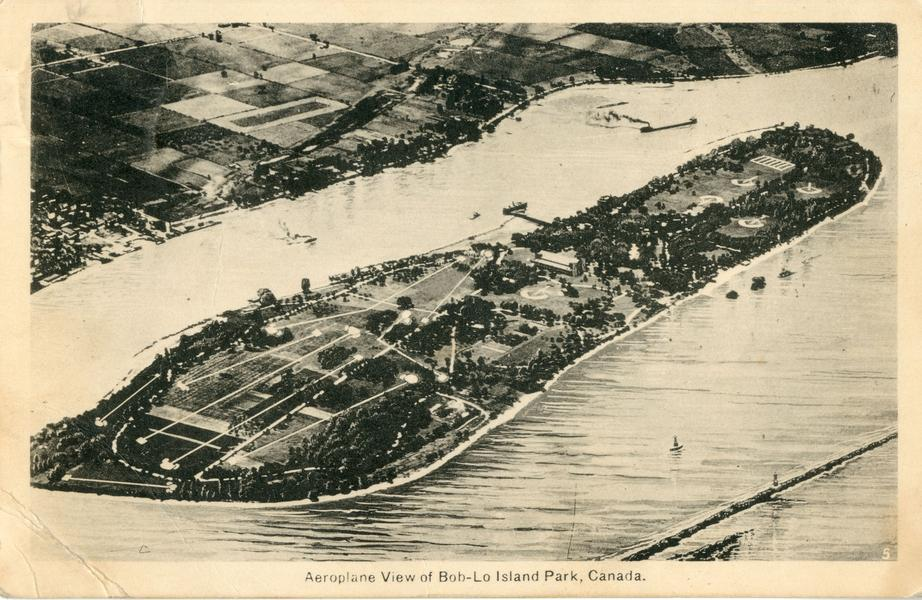
Aerial view of Bois Blanc Island in 1941

Bois Blanc Island (42°05′50″N 83°07′16″W), popularly known as Boblo Island, is a 274-acre (1.11 km^{2}) island in the southeast portion of the Detroit River. It is the southernmost Canadian island in the river and is administered by the town of Amherstburg.

In 1836, the Bois Blanc Island Lighthouse and Blockhouse were constructed on the island as an aid to navigation at the mouth of the Detroit River. The island then served as a military outpost. The lighthouse was decommissioned in the late 1950s, but the structures remain to this day. The island is most famously known as the location for the Boblo Island Amusement Park, which operated from 1898 to 1993. Ferries services routinely brought Americans to the island from the Boblo Island Detroit Dock further upstream. The island has no bridges connecting to the mainland; local ferries continue to serve the residents that now live in upscale housing on the northside of the island. The southside, where the amusement park once stood, remains undeveloped. The island is accessible to the public.

=== Crystal Island ===
Crystal Island (42°07′21″N 83°07′17″W) is an artificial island located directly across the international border from Stony Island. Though it is uninhabited, it is part of the town of Amherstburg. Similar to Stony Island, it was created to provide and mark a deeper shipping lane, and the island has a very irregular shape. Crystal Island's odd shape created a pristine inlet known as Crystal Bay. The small bay is protected by the island from the river's current and pollution, thus creating an unusually calm and clear shelter. While the island itself is off limits since it serves as a nature preserve, the bay is a popular destination for boaters and fishermen.

=== Fighting Island ===
Fighting Island (42°13′18″N 83°07′12″W) is the largest Canadian island in the Detroit River at 1,500 acres (6.07 km^{2}). It is the second largest island in the river after Grosse Ile. Fighting Island is administered by the town of LaSalle, but it is privately owned by the German-based BASF, which has a facility across the river in Wyandotte.

The island originally had a small indigenous population before it was purchased by the Michigan Alkali Company in 1918. The company used the island as a dumping ground for waste. The island served as a dumping ground until at least 1982. In 1989, it was reported that 80% of the island was covered in highly acidic brine waste, which also caused dust clouds to travel to nearby communities. BASF purchased the company (by then Wyandotte Chemical Company) in the early 1970s, and has since done a large-scale cleanup and restoration of the island. The island remains undeveloped and serves as a growing nature refuge and educational retreat.

=== Grass Island ===
Grass Island (42°13′17″N 83°06′30″W) is an extremely narrow and elongated island between Fighting Island and mainland LaSalle, which administers the island. The island is uninhabited and undeveloped. The island is sometimes referred to as Grassy Island, which is an American island on the exact opposite side of the river.

=== Peche Island ===
Peche Island (42°20′45″N 82°55′31″W) is an 86-acre (34.8 ha) island at the very beginning of the Detroit River at Lake St. Clair. It is within the city of Windsor. It is the easternmost island in the river and is just east of Belle Isle. Peche Island was historically known by its French names Isle aux Pêcheurs (Fisherman Island) and Isle a la Pêche (Fishing Island), but it was sometimes referred to as Peach Island due to the English pronunciation.

The island was originally privately owned and used as a lavish summer residence for Hiram Walker and later others. Later owners attempted to profit and turn the island into an amusement park and resort destination similar to Belle Isle and Boblo Island Amusement Park, but these plans never came to fruition. The island was eventually sold to the Province of Ontario and converted into a provincial park in 1974, but the island had no future plans. The City of Windsor purchased the unused island in 1999. The island has since remained undeveloped and serves as a nature preserve and city park.

=== Turkey Island ===
Turkey Island (42°11′09″N 83°06′48″W) is a small uninhabited island just south of Fighting Island. The island is within the town of Amherstburg. The island is privately owned, inaccessible, and undeveloped.

== See also ==
- Detroit River
- Detroit River International Wildlife Refuge
- List of islands of Michigan
- List of islands of Ontario
