= John Karmazin Sr. =

John Karmazin Sr. (23 May 1884– 25 May 1977) was an American engine component inventor and business founder.

Born in Tman, Austria-Hungary (today in the Czech Republic), Karmazin emigrated to the United States in 1903 and became an American citizen. After earning a bachelor of science degree in mechanical engineering from the University of Illinois at Urbana-Champaign, Karmazin worked for manufacturers in the Chicago area. In 1916, International Harvester assigned Karmazin to assist in the formation of one of the first vehicle plants in Moscow, Russia. After the Bolsheviks seized power during the October Revolution and took control of private industry, Karmazin fled Russia with his wife on the Trans-Siberian Railroad and returned to the U.S.

Because of his background in engineering, ability to speak the Czech language, and experience as one of the relatively few American citizens to personally witness the Russian Revolution, he joined the U.S. Army Military Intelligence Division at the rank of captain in 1918. At the conclusion of World War I, the U.S. Army assigned Karmazin to the American Commission to Negotiate Peace. In this capacity, Karmazin provided the Commission with intelligence reports about developments in Central Europe. The Commission stationed him in Prague where he provided advice to Tomáš Masaryk, the first president of Czechoslovakia, and other top Czech officials on economic matters and structuring the new country's first democratic government.

Following his military service, Karmazin returned to the U.S. to resume his career as an engineer while beginning to seek patents on his inventions. In 1926, he settled his family in Grosse Ile, Michigan which became his home for the rest of his life. While working for the Harrison Radiator Division of General Motors, Karmazin obtained patents for major improvements to the automobile radiator cap. In M.J. Nunney's book titled Light & Heavy Vehicle Technology, Karmazin is described as "the unsung hero of the modern vehicle cooling system" in recognition of these patents.

With royalties earned from General Motors for his radiator cap patent, he founded the Karmazin Products Corporation in Wyandotte, Michigan during 1946. The company produced radiators, oil coolers and many other heat transfer devices that were primarily used in heavy construction equipment, tractors and trucks. Most of the company's products were based on patents obtained by Karmazin who was awarded more than 50 patents by the U.S. Patent and Trademark Office during his lifetime. During its peak sales in the 1970s, the company had approximately 300 workers and was one of the largest private sector employers in Downriver Detroit.

Karmazin died in 1977 and was survived by two sons and a daughter. He was a long-time member of the Society of Automotive Engineers, University of Illinois Alumni Association, and many civic and community organizations.

== Patents ==
- U.S. Patent No. 1,761,396 "Pressure Value and Condenser"—June 3, 1930.

== Sources ==
- Nunney, M.J., Light & Heavy Vehicle Technology, Oxford, England, Butterworth-Heinemann: 1998, 672 pages, pp. 133.
- "John Karmazin Sr. is Dead at 93", The News-Herald, June 1, 1977.
