= Wayne County Bridge =

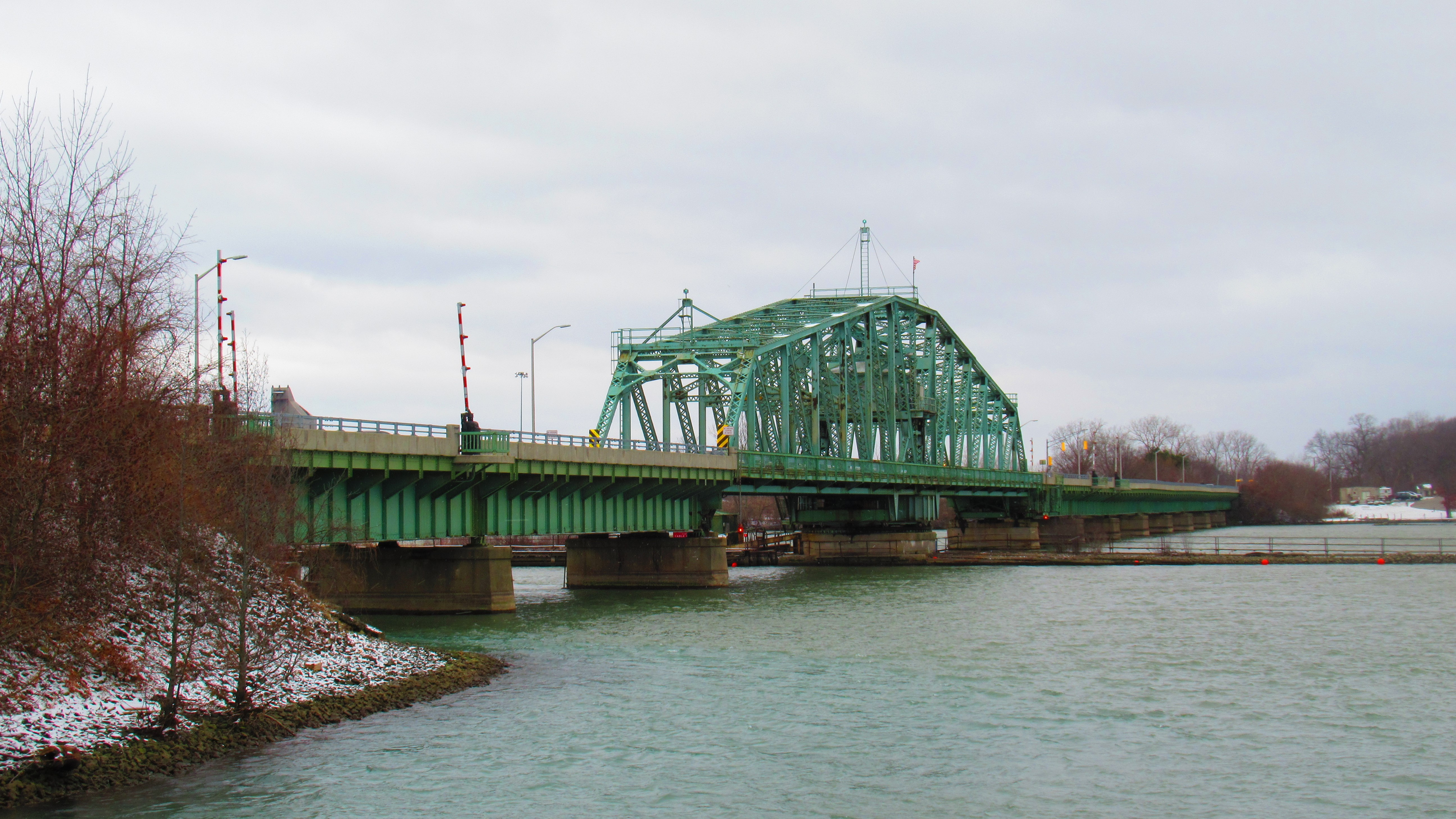
- View of the bridge from Grosse Ile
- Coordinates: 42°7′39.2″N 83°10′31.2″W
- Carries: Grosse Ile Parkway
- Crosses: Trenton Channel of the Detroit River
- Locale: Grosse Ile Township and Trenton; Wayne County, Michigan

Characteristics
- Design: Swing bridge

History
- Opened: September 1931

Statistics
- Toll: None

The Wayne County Bridge is a swing bridge that crosses the Trenton Channel in the Detroit River. Located in Wayne County, Michigan, it connects Grosse Ile Township to mainland Trenton and is one of two bridges connecting the island of Grosse Ile to the mainland — the other being the tolled Grosse Ile Toll Bridge to the north. Locally, it is also known as "The Free Bridge".

== History ==
During 1931, Wayne County converted the Michigan Central Railroad's defunct rail bridge crossing the Trenton Channel into the Wayne County Bridge for use by vehicular, bike, and pedestrian traffic. Canada Southern Bridge Company, a subsidiary of the Canada Southern Railroad Company, built the rail bridge in 1873. A number of the original support piers and other parts of the bridge served as the foundation for the Wayne County Bridge.

The rail tracks across the island were replaced by a roadway that is now known as Grosse Ile Parkway. The Wayne County Bridge is commonly called the "Free Bridge" by Grosse Ile residents because of the absence of a user fee toll for crossing. Today, about three-quarters of the vehicle traffic going to and from Grosse Ile travels over the Wayne County Bridge while one-quarter crosses the Grosse Ile Toll Bridge.

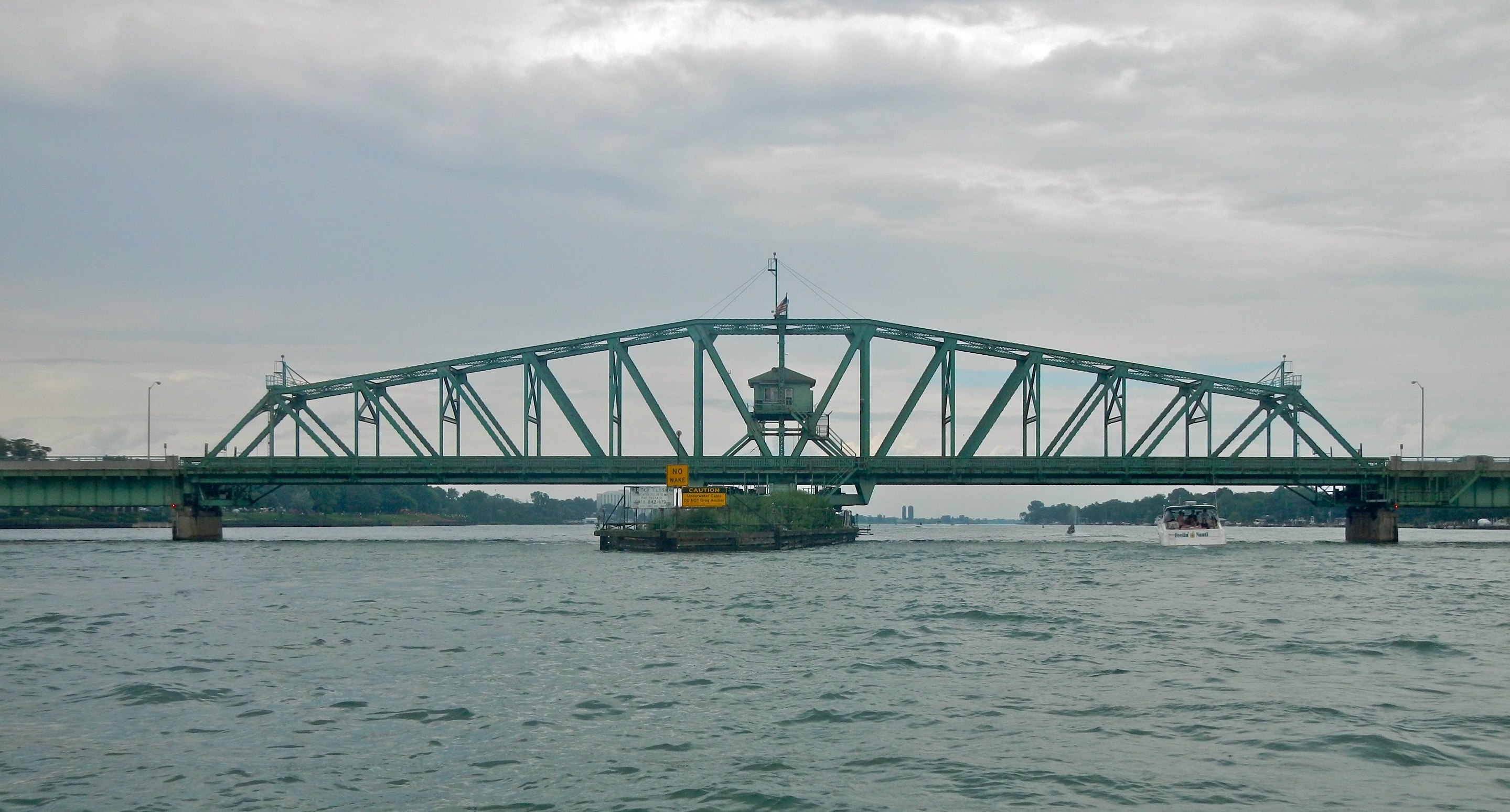
Swing-span section of bridge

Wayne County completely closed the bridge to vehicle traffic from May 2, 2007, until December 21, 2007, to enable the replacement of the bridge deck and related major repairs. The previous replacement of the bridge deck took place in 1979. During much of the 1979 closure period, one lane of traffic remained open on the County Bridge. At the times when the span was completely closed, the only vehicle access to and from the island was via the Grosse Ile Toll Bridge.

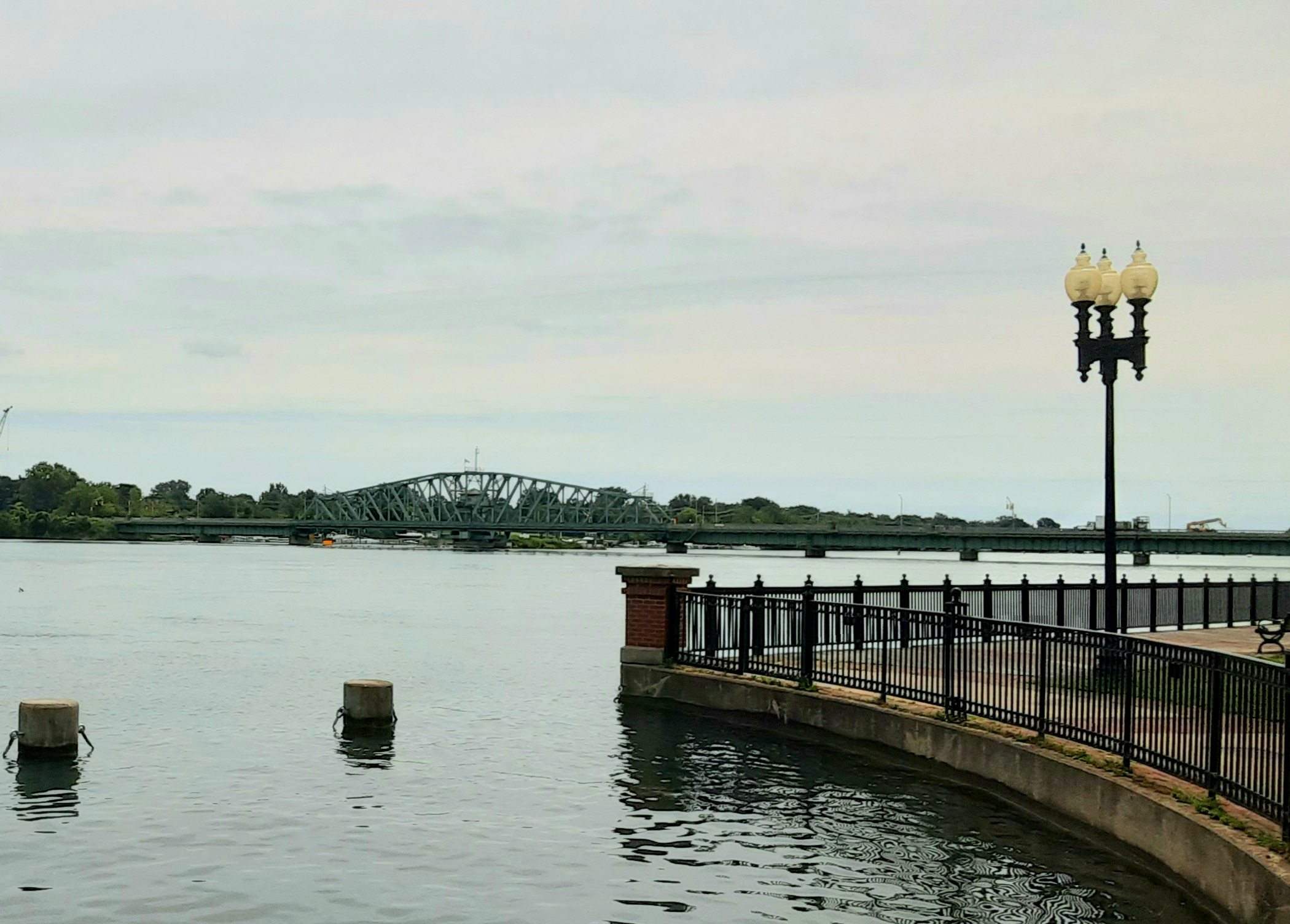
Bridge as seen from Elizabeth Park, Trenton, Michigan

The bridge was closed on November 13, 2019, after township officials learned a report on a safety inspection of the bridge conducted three months earlier found deterioration that "caused some alarm," according to one official. Authorities said they had no prior notice. The bridge was temporarily closed while emergency repairs could be made, at which point the bridge was reopened but scheduled for extensive repairs and closures in 2020.

In April 2020, Grosse Ile Township announced that the bridge would be closed for necessary repairs from May 6, 2020, until December 2020.

== Sources ==
- "Wayne County Receives a Grant for the Grosse Ile Bridge".
- "Smoke Speaks". Ile Camera. July 21, 2006.
- Karmazin, Nancy G., "Quick History of Grosse Ile", 1999.
