= Grosse Ile Township, Michigan =

- Civil township
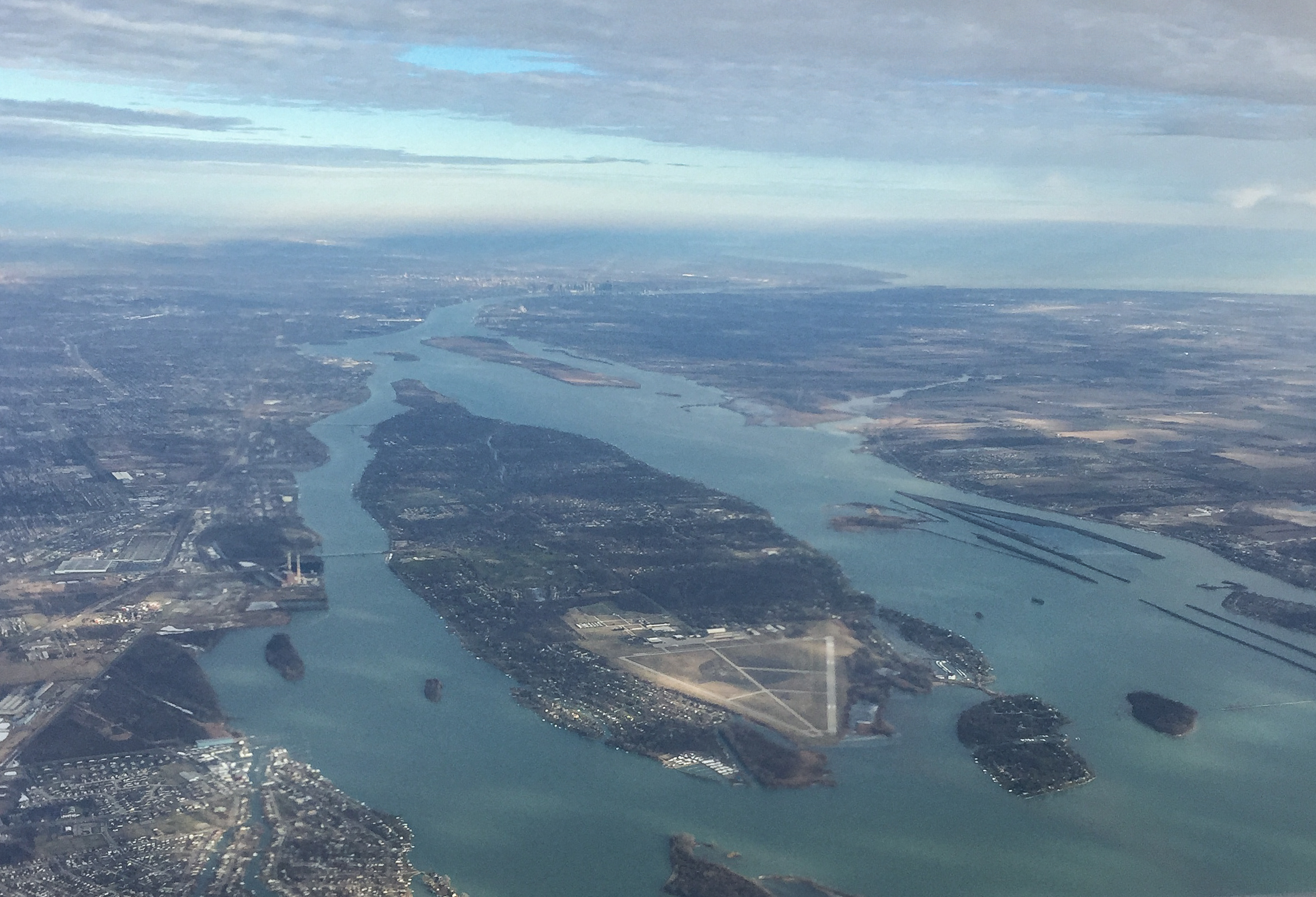
- Aerial view of Grosse Ile Township looking north

- Location within Wayne County

- Location within the state of Michigan Location within the United States
- Coordinates: 42°07′48″N 83°09′37″W
- Country: United States
- State: Michigan
- County: Wayne
- Settled: 1776
- Organized: 1914

Government
  - Supervisor (As of 2026): Joe Porcarelli
  - Clerk (As of 2026): Jamison Yager

Area
  - Civil township: 18.67 sq mi (48.36 km^{2})
  - Land: 9.20 sq mi (23.83 km^{2})
  - Water: 9.47 sq mi (24.53 km^{2})
- Elevation: 594 ft (181 m)

Population (2020)
  - Civil township: 10,788
  - Density: 1,127.3/sq mi (435.3/km^{2})
  - Metro: 4,285,832 (Metro Detroit)
- Time zone: UTC-5 (EST)
  - Summer (DST): UTC-4 (EDT)
- ZIP code: 48138 (Grosse Ile); 48192 (Wyandotte)
- Area code: 734
- FIPS code: 26-35420
- GNIS feature ID: 1626407
- Website: grosseile.com

Grosse Ile Township is a civil township in Wayne County in the U.S. state of Michigan. A Downriver suburb of Detroit, Grosse Ile Township consists of multiple islands in the Detroit River (the largest of which is Grosse Ile), roughly 18 miles (29.0 km) southwest of downtown Detroit. As of the 2020 census, the township had a population was 10,777.

Named by French explorers in 1679, Grosse Île means "Big Island". Later taken under British rule after 1763, the island was not settled by European Americans until after the United States achieved independence in the American Revolutionary War. Grosse Ile Township was organized in 1914 after it split away from Monguagon Township.

== Geography ==
According to the United States Census Bureau, the township has a total area of 18.67 square miles (48.36 km^{2}), of which 9.20 square miles (23.83 km^{2}) is land and 9.47 square miles (24.53 km^{2}) (50.72%) is water.

Grosse Ile is the largest island on the Detroit River. The township of Grosse Ile is composed of twelve islands, although the community is most often identified with the main island (which residents simply refer to as "The Island"). Grosse Ile's main island is technically composed of two islands. Grosse Ile Township is one of only seven municipalities in the state of Michigan to consist entirely of islands, including St. James Township, Drummond Township, Bois Blanc Township (in northern Michigan, not to be confused with the nearby Bois Blanc Island, which is in Canada), Mackinac Island, Peaine Township, and Sugar Island Township.

The tip of the main island's northern section is named Hennepin Point in honor of the 17th-century French explorer Father Louis Hennepin. It is uninhabited and separated from the remainder of the northern section by an unnamed canal that cannot be navigated in a power boat.

The southern section of the main island is separated from the northern section by the Thorofare Canal, which runs on a diagonal course from east to west connecting the main channel of the Detroit River with the Trenton Channel of the river. The southern section of the main island is connected by bridges to Elba Island, Meso Island (also known as Upper Hickory Island), Hickory Island, and Swan Island, which are all inhabited.

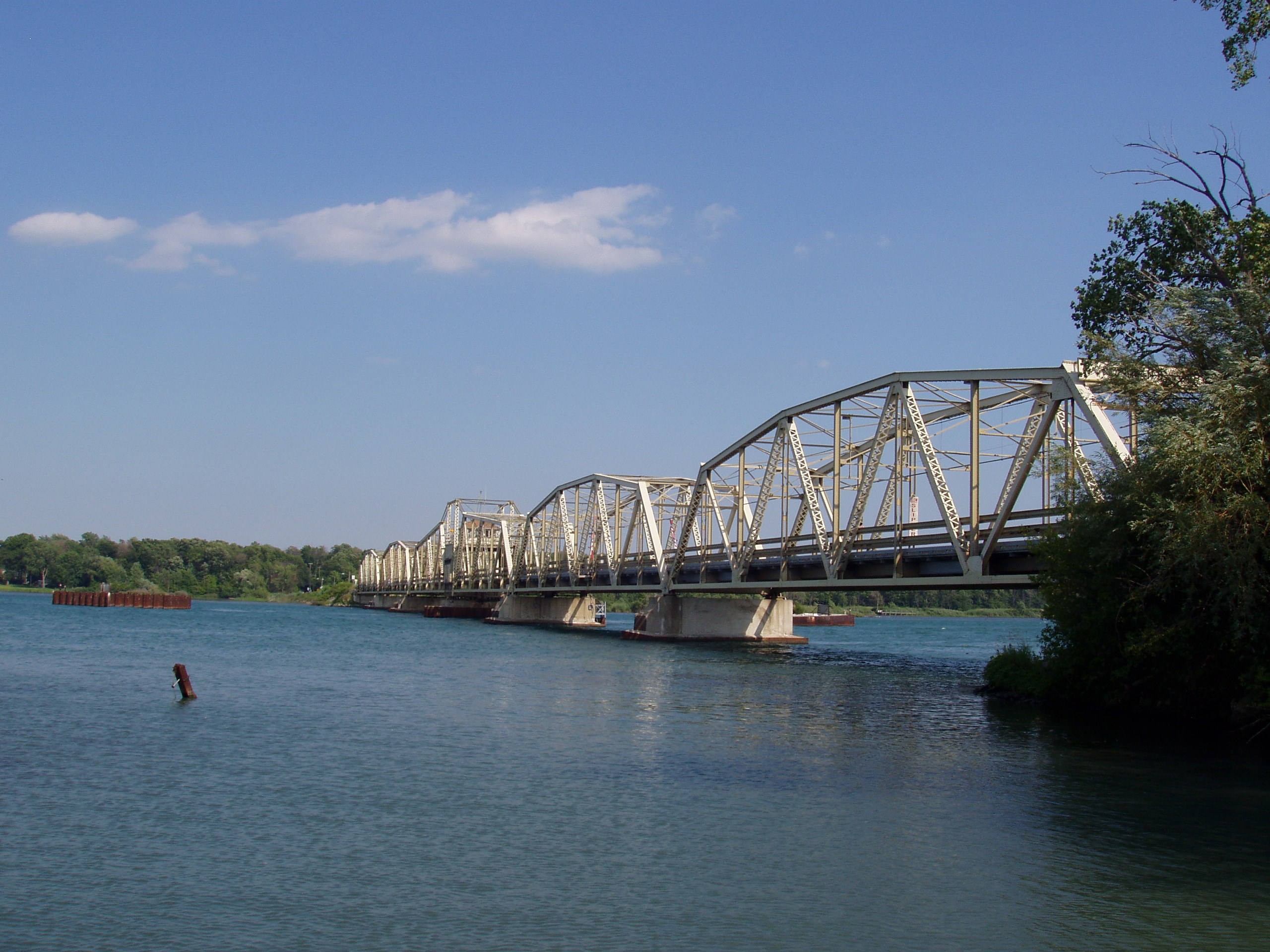
Grosse Ile Toll Bridge

Not far from the shoreline of the main island in the river lie Calf Island, Celeron Island (charted as Tawas Island), Dynamite (also known as Powder House Island), Fox Island, Stony Island, and Sugar Island, which are all uninhabited. Stony and Celeron are owned by the Michigan Department of Natural Resources. Calf Island is owned by the U.S. Fish and Wildlife Service as a part of the Detroit River International Wildlife Refuge. The other islands are privately owned. The low-lying Mamajuda Island is off the northeastern tip of Grosse Ile and is visible only during times of low water level.

Two bridges connect the main island to the mainland of Michigan. The bridge on the north end of the island is called the Grosse Ile Toll Bridge (off-white color). The bridge on the south end of the island is officially named the Wayne County Bridge (light green in color), but is commonly called the "Free Bridge" by locals.

== History ==
=== Founding and early times ===
The Potawatomi occupied areas of the island, which they called Kitcheminishen, for a long period prior to European encounter. They were one of the tribes in the Council of Three Fires.

The flags of three nations—France, England, and the United States—have flown over Detroit and Grosse Ile since the first French explorers visited the island during the late 17th century. The early French explorers named the island as la grosse île—the "big island" in French. Father Louis Hennepin, a Catholic priest and missionary, accompanied fellow French explorer René-Robert Cavelier, Sieur de La Salle in 1679 on the ship Le Griffon in exploring the Great Lakes. The Sacred Heart Roman Catholic Church on Grosse Ile says that Father Hennepin came ashore and said mass at a location on the east shore of the island near the present site of St. Anne's Chapel. No record exists of this event, but Father Hennepin wrote in his journals about the fruit orchards and wild animals on Grosse Ile, showing he was here. The north end of Grosse Ile is named Hennepin Point in his honor.

French explorer Antoine de la Mothe Cadillac and his convoy of 25 canoes sailed down the Detroit River and camped on the shore of Grosse Ile during the evening of July 23, 1701. On the morning of July 24, Cadillac returned upriver and landed ashore, where he claimed French possession of the territory under the authority of King Louis XIV. This site is in present-day Detroit, near the present intersection of West Jefferson and Shelby streets.

Grosse Ile maintained its own name and identity as a community through the 18th century. The British established control of the island and present-day Michigan in 1763 after their victory in the French and Indian War. They anglicized the spelling to "Grosse Isle".

Although the Potawatomi, like most Native Americans, did not have the same sense of property ownership as did Europeans and Americans, they considered the island to be part of their ancestral lands. On July 6, 1776, they deeded the island to brothers Alexander and William Macomb, brothers from Albany who had become leading fur traders and merchants in Detroit, partly from selling supplies to the British at Fort Detroit and the local Indian Department. They are considered to be the founders of the European-American community on the island.

=== Settlement to present ===
Settlement started in the 19th century. At least three homes still standing on the island were built during this period by a descendant or relative of the Macomb brothers. The Rucker Homestead, the oldest structure in use on Grosse Ile, has portions that date to 1816. The front structure was added by John Anthony Rucker in 1835. The Rucker-Stanton House on West River Road was built in 1848 by the great-grandson of William Macomb. The Wendell House on East River Road was built in the late 1860s by John Wendell, who married a granddaughter of William Macomb.

Westcroft Gardens, a Michigan Centennial Farm located on West River Road, is operated by descendants of the Macombs. Westcroft, which is open to the public, features a nursery well known for growing and selling hybrid azaleas and rhododendrons. Westcroft is one of the oldest farms in Michigan still owned by the same family. Most of the original buildings at Westcroft Gardens are still standing and well preserved.

Macomb Street of the central business district of Grosse Ile was named in honor of Alexander and William Macomb. A monument commemorating the day that the tribal chiefs and elders signed the deed to the Macomb brothers is located at the foot of Gray's Drive and near the shoreline of the Detroit River. The original deed, which was written on parchment, is stored in the Burton Historical Collection at the Detroit Public Library.

=== Trenton Channel and boating ===
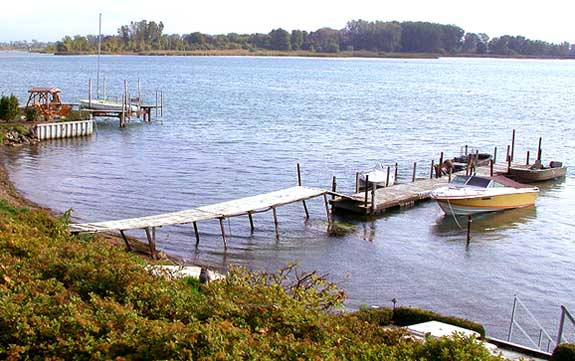
A section of Grosse Ile waterfront

Boating has been both a means of transportation and recreation since the first residents lived on the island. Native Americans used canoes to travel between Grosse Ile's islands and the mainland in Michigan and Canada. Early European settlers primarily used sail-powered vessels to travel to and from the islands.

By the late 19th century, Grosse Ile was known as a popular destination for recreational boaters. It was also served by steamboats operating from Detroit and small towns along the river and lakes. During this time period, Sugar Island, which is one of the twelve islands commonly considered to comprise Grosse Ile, featured an amusement park, dance pavilion, and bathing beach. Paddle steamers regularly carried people from Detroit and other points along the Michigan side of the Detroit River to Sugar Island.

During this era and into the early 20th century, a number of wealthy residents from Detroit and other nearby towns built summer homes along the shoreline (mainly on the southern end) of Grosse Ile in order to enjoy views of the Detroit River or Lake Erie. The interior section of the island was sparsely populated, as most of the land was undeveloped woodlands or part of farms. The residential population of Grosse Ile totaled 802 at the 1920 U.S. Census. The majority of houses were located around the perimeter of the island and main roads crossed the community chiefly in either a north–south or east–west direction.

In 1894, the federal government funded and constructed a series of channel range lights to assist ships to avoid shallow areas in the Detroit River and its shoreline. The northernmost of the channel range lights was the Grosse Ile Light, which is now the only lighthouse remaining on the island. The original 1894 Grosse Ile lighthouse resembled a water tower on stilts, as it was constructed on wooden pilings along with a 170-foot (52 m) walkway to shore.

It was rebuilt in 1906 and designed as the classic white structure that has become one of the iconic landmarks on the island. The lighthouse is considered a symbol of Grosse Ile; its image is used on the masthead of the Ile Camera community newspaper and many other places. The lighthouse's beacon was turned off in the 1940s, and the structure is no longer an important navigation aid for lake freighters. Small boaters still refer to the lighthouse in their navigation of the area.

In 1965, the Grosse Ile Township purchased the lighthouse from the U.S. Department of the Interior for $350, with funds provided by the Grosse Ile Historical Society (GIHS). The GIHS was given the responsibility to preserve and maintain the lighthouse. The GIHS annually holds a tour of the lighthouse during a weekend each fall, which is the only time of the year that it is open to the public.

Island resident Cameron Waterman invented the outboard motor and successfully tested his invention during February 1905 in the ice-filled Detroit River off the shore of Grosse Ile. He established the Waterman Marine Motor Company in Detroit. The company eventually manufactured and sold up to 1,000 outboard motors per year until Waterman sold the business in 1917. During the fall of 2005, the GIHS celebrated the 100th anniversary of Waterman's invention by hosting a public exhibition featuring fully restored Waterman outboard motors. These are highly collectible and very rare.

During the Prohibition era, Grosse Ile became a crossing point for bootleggers illegally smuggling alcoholic beverages from Canada. They typically arrived at the island via small speed boats. During the winter months, some daring smugglers drove cars across the frozen river.

=== Aviation and military ===
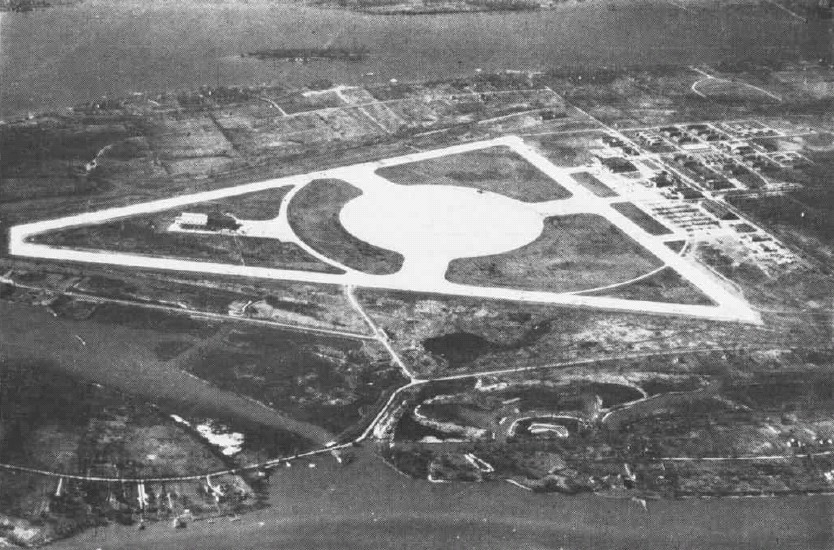
Naval Air Station

During the 1920s and 1930s, a small airport on the southern end of Grosse Ile was the location of historic early aviation activities. The Curtiss-Wright Flying Service operated a flying school at the airport. The Aircraft Development Corporation built the world's first all-metal airship, the ZMC-2, for the Navy in a large hangar. Amelia Earhart is rumored to have stopped at the airfield on occasion.

Grosse Ile was the home of a U.S. Navy base for forty years. The U.S. Naval Air Station Grosse Ile opened in 1929 after three years of construction of seaplane and dirigible facilities. During World War II, the naval base developed into an important center for military flight training. The base was expanded considerably to accommodate large numbers of American and British fliers who trained on the island. As a young man during WWII, George H. W. Bush was stationed at the base for training during 1945 for about two months. He later became a politician and President of the United States.

During the height of the Cold War, in 1954 the U.S. Army installed an Ajax-Nike missile base at the airfield; it was functional until being decommissioned in 1963. The Navy closed the base during November 1969. The federal government transferred it in 1971 to the township government for civilian use as a municipal airport.

Today, the Grosse Ile Municipal Airport is used primarily for general aviation. It has also been the site of public airshows. Occasionally it serves as a temporary docking area for blimps that visit southeastern Michigan to fly over major sporting events. The United States Environmental Protection Agency (USEPA) operated the Large Lakes Research Station in one of the buildings on the airport grounds, until its closure in 2019. The airport campus is also the site of Grosse Ile Township Hall, which was moved to this location in 2000 from Macomb Street, and a number of private businesses.

=== Railroads and bridges ===
In 1873 the Canada Southern Bridge Company, a subsidiary of the Canada Southern Railroad Company, established a railroad from the Michigan mainland to the island that carried both passengers and freight. The company laid tracks across Grosse Ile and built bridges over the Detroit River to enable trains to be transferred to a ferryboat on Stony Island (one of the islands near the east shoreline of Grosse Ile's "main island"). Once on the ferryboat, the train cars were taken to Ontario, Canada across the river, where they were put back on a rail track to travel to Buffalo, New York and other points east. Canada Southern operated trains on this route for about ten years before ceasing service due to financial difficulties.

After Canada Southern ended its operations, the Michigan Central Railroad (MCR) operated a train that provided service between the island and Trenton, Michigan. From Trenton, travelers could connect with trains or streetcars to Detroit and other cities in the region. In 1904, the Michigan Central Railroad built a small brick and stone depot along the tracks near East River Road on the east side of the island.

Train service peaked during the early 20th century, but rapidly declined after Edward W. Voigt's Grosse Ile Bridge Company opened the Grosse Ile Toll Bridge for automobile traffic on November 27, 1913 (Thanksgiving Day). The bridge, which is privately owned, is on the west side of the island and connects to the city of Riverview. After automobile traffic crossing the bridge became the most popular means of traveling to and from the island, the Michigan Central Railroad ceased daily passenger service in early 1924; in 1929 it ended its occasional freight service.

During 1931, the county government converted the Michigan Central Railroad's defunct rail bridge crossing the Trenton Channel into the Wayne County Bridge for use by vehicular, bike and pedestrian traffic. The rail tracks across the island were replaced by a roadway that is now known as Grosse Ile Parkway. The Wayne County Bridge is commonly referred to as the "Free Bridge" by residents because it does not charge a toll.

Today, about three-quarters of the vehicle traffic going to and from Grosse Ile travels over the Wayne County Bridge, while one-quarter crosses the Toll Bridge. The Toll Bridge has been hit twice by lake freighters, causing it to close temporarily (in 1965 and in 1992). The Wayne County Bridge was closed to vehicle traffic for major renovations between May 2, 2007, and December 21, 2007. During the 2007 county bridge closure period, the Toll Bridge provided the only route for vehicles to travel to and from the island.

=== Grosse Ile Historic District ===
Today, the MCR train depot is owned and operated as a community museum by the Grosse Ile Historical Society (GIHS). Nearby is the old U.S. Customs House, which was relocated to the current site in 1980 from Macomb Street. The GIHS also owns the Custom House, and these are the only structures in the National Historic District along East River Road that are regularly open to the public. The district features Saint James Episcopal Church, the oldest church building on the island, constructed during 1867 in part with funds provided by a freed slave named Elizabeth Denison. The district includes six homes, built from the 1840s to 1860s, that are outstanding examples of period architecture, particularly Gothic Revival and Jacobethan Revival.

=== Modern times, growth and preservation ===
Grosse Ile has good views of commercial shipping and pleasure boat traffic on the Detroit River. Lake freighters and oceangoing ships traveling to destinations around the Great Lakes regularly pass near the east side of the island, where the main channel of the Detroit River separates Grosse Ile from Ontario, Canada.

While the shoreline areas of Grosse Ile feature the majority of historically significant places and structures, approximately a dozen 1920s-era homes in the Jewell Colony subdivision, located in the middle of the island, are listed on the Michigan Register of Historic Places. Jewell Colony was the first planned subdivision on the island.

During the later 20th century, Grosse Ile had a significant increase in the rate of residential development, given its advantageous location and other amenities. By the 1980 census, the population of Grosse Ile had increased to approximately 9,300— about 106% over its population in the 1960 census.

Fearing the destruction of the natural character and small-town charm of the community, during the early 1990s the Grosse Ile Township established an "Open Space Program", to be funded by a voter-approved dedicated local property tax to buy undeveloped land. The township acquired large tracts of environmentally sensitive land to slow the pace of development, preserve the environment, and protect housing values.

In 1993, a group of residents established a 501(c)(3) non-profit organization named the Grosse Ile Land & Nature Conservancy, to aid in the protection and stewardship of the diverse natural resources on the island. A number of private owners donated environmentally important woodland and wetland areas to the Conservancy to protect them (and to get a tax write-off.)

The U.S. EPA granted stewardship responsibilities to the Conservancy for a 40.5-acre (16.4 ha) marsh and upland area on the federally owned section of the Grosse Ile Municipal Airport. This tract of land, which at one time was the location of the Navy's seaplane base and later the Army's Nike missile base, has been restored to its natural state; it features rich biodiversity and rare coastal wetlands. Named the Nature Area by the Conservancy, this land is periodically used by local teachers and Boy Scout groups to teach children about nature and the importance of conservation.

Grosse Ile is a community of about 10,371 residents. Money magazine ranked Grosse Ile as one of the "Top 100 Best Places to Live" in 2009.

== Culture ==
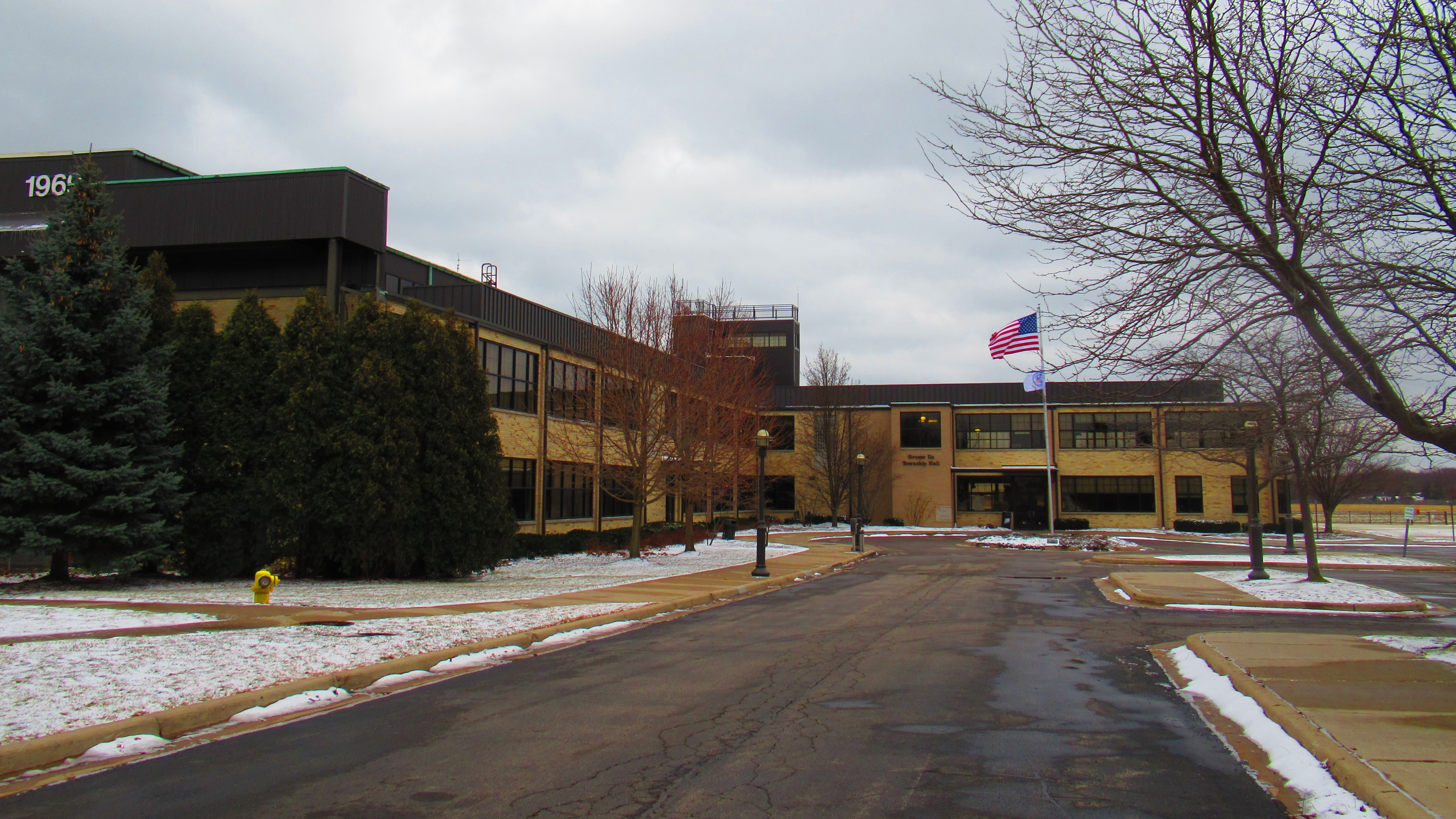
Grosse Ile Township Hall

The annual "Islandfest" (formerly "Azalea Festival") takes place around Grosse Ile Municipal Airport. On the same site as Islandfest, the Grosse Ile Youth Recreational Association (GIYRA), a 501c3 charity, runs a haunted house every Halloween. GIYRA coordinates the youth sporting events for the island children. The sports offered by GIYRA are Football and Cheer, Flag Football, Basketball, Baseball and Softball.

The island has an indoor tennis facility: six courts inside an old hangar at the city's municipal airport. The Grosse Ile Soccer Association coordinates the township's soccer league. The rapidly expanding soccer association, which started by hosting a recreational league, has expanded into a larger association. The Grosse Ile Soccer Association has more than 15 select travel / premier level teams on top of the in-house recreational program.

Grosse Ile's community theatre, The Islanders, is Downriver's oldest theatre club and one of the oldest civic theatre groups in the state of Michigan. The club has been active on Grosse Ile since 1925, when friends and neighbors developed a means of entertainment during the long Michigan winters. The first major play was produced on May 21, 1926, by a group of 40 founding members.

Grosse Ile social clubs include the Grosse Ile Yacht Club, the Ford Yacht Club, the Elba-Mar Boat Club, the Grosse Ile Golf and Country Club, West Shore Golf Course, Water's Edge Golf Course, the Kiwanis Club of Grosse Ile, and the Grosse Ile Rotary Club (founded in 1947).

== Education ==
Grosse Ile Township Schools serves the township.

On the island, there are two elementary schools: Parke Lane Elementary which serves grades K-2nd, and Meridian Elementary which serves grades 3rd-5th. The Grosse Ile Middle School enrolls students in 6–8, and Grosse Ile High School provides college preparatory education for grades 9–12. Their mascot is the Red Devil.

In 2001, Grosse Ile was ranked the highest out of 88 school districts in Michigan by The Detroit News.

== Demographics ==
The U.S. Census Bureau also defined Grosse Ile Township as a census-designated place (CDP) in the 2000 Census so that the community would appear on the list of places (like cities and villages) as well on the list of county subdivisions (like other townships). The final statistics for the township and the CDP were identical.

As of the census of 2020, there were 10,786 people, and 4,250 households residing in the township. The population density was 1,194.2 persons per square mile. The racial makeup of the township was 90.5% White, 3.4% African American, 0.2% Native American, 2.6% Asian, 0% Pacific Islander, and 3.0% from two or more races. Hispanic or Latino residents of any race were 3.2% of the population.

The median income for a household in the township was $125,469. The per capita income for the township was $65,696. About 3.2% of the population were below the poverty line.

The township is considered to be among the safest communities in Michigan.

== Notable people ==
- Harry Bennett, Henry Ford's personnel director
- John Robert Beyster, founder of the Science Applications International Corporation
- Thornton F. Brodhead, Army veteran and state politician
- Charles T. Fisher, businessman and an automotive pioneer
- Henry Ford, founder and president of the Ford Motor Company, bought a sizable tract of land within Grosse Ile Township
- Max Gail, actor who has starred in stage, television, and film roles
- Grant Horvat, golfer and YouTuber
- John Karmazin Sr., engine component inventor and business founder
- Michael D. Knox, antiwar activist, educator, psychologist, and author
- William S. Knudsen, automotive executive and general during World War II
- Daniel H. Rucker, U.S. Army brigadier general
- Ransom E. Olds, automotive pioneer and founder of the Olds Motor Vehicle Company
- Heinz Prechter, founder of the American Sunroof Company
- Jack Telnack, automotive designer and executive
