= Tmaň =

- Municipality
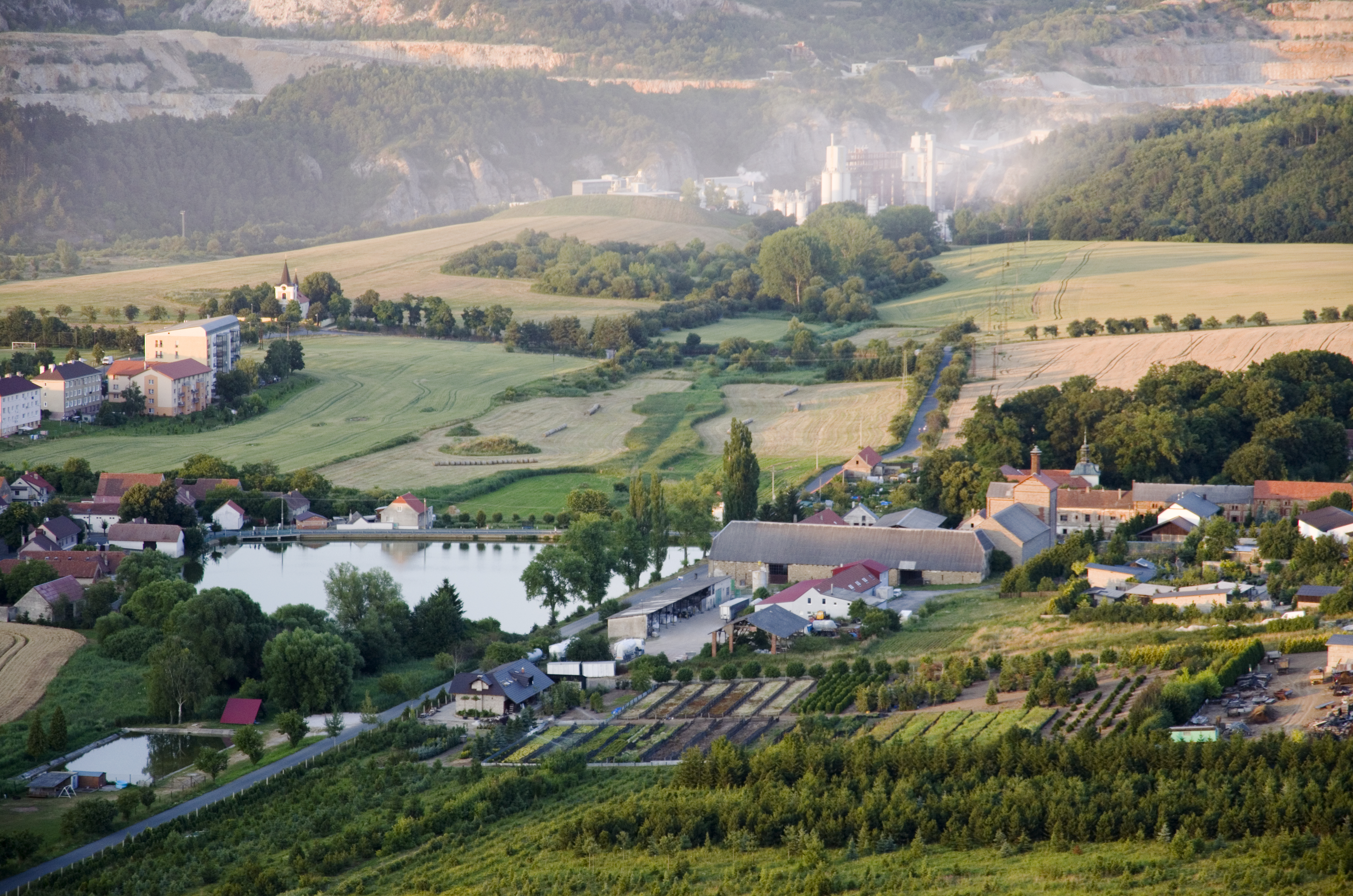
- Aerial view

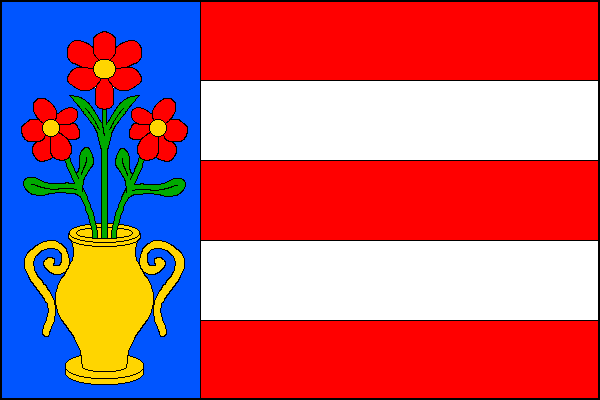
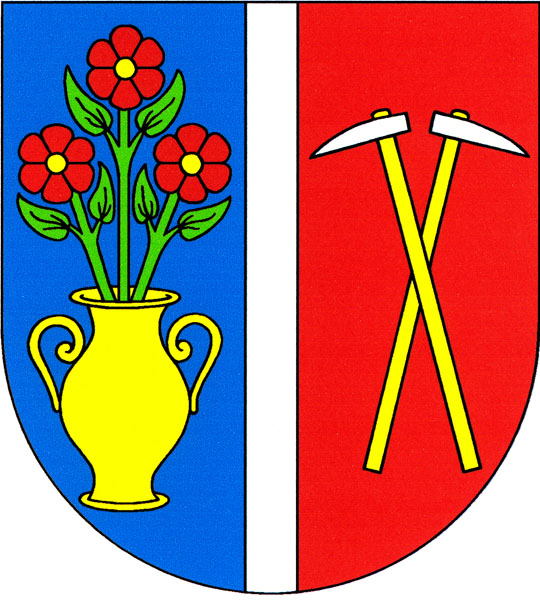
- Flag Coat of arms

- Location in the Czech Republic
- Coordinates: 49°54′24″N 14°2′5″E
- Country: Czech Republic
- Region: Central Bohemian
- District: Beroun
- First mentioned: 1170

Area
  - Total: 10.09 km^{2} (3.90 sq mi)
- Elevation: 361 m (1,184 ft)

Population (2026-01-01)
  - Total: 1,256
  - Density: 124.5/km^{2} (322.4/sq mi)
- Time zone: UTC+1 (CET)
  - Summer (DST): UTC+2 (CEST)
- Postal codes: 267 01, 267 21
- Website: www.obectman.cz

Tmaň is a municipality and village in Beroun District in the Central Bohemian Region of the Czech Republic. It has about 1,300 inhabitants.

== Administrative division ==
Tmaň consists of three municipal parts (in brackets population according to the 2021 census):

- Tmaň (1,067)
- Lounín (127)
- Slavíky (16)

== Etymology ==
The name Tmaň is derived from the personal name Tman, meaning "Tman's (court)".

== Geography ==
Tmaň is located about 6 kilometres (4 mi) south of Beroun and 30 km (19 mi) southwest of Prague. It lies in the Hořovice Uplands. The highest point is the hill Lejškov at 487 m (1,598 ft) above sea level. In the municipality is a set of several small fishponds, supplied by a nameless stream. The municipal territory extends into the Český kras Protected Landscape Area in the east.

== History ==
The first written mention of Tmaň is from 1170. From 1315 at the latest, the village was divided into two parts with different owners. The eastern part was owned by the church and the western part was owned by nobility.

== Demographics ==
Historical population

Year	Pop.	±%
1869	731	—
1880	760	+4.0%
1890	822	+8.2%
1900	905	+10.1%
1910	891	−1.5%

Year	Pop.	±%
1921	799	−10.3%
1930	773	−3.3%
1950	750	−3.0%
1961	663	−11.6%
1970	901	+35.9%

Year	Pop.	±%
1980	774	−14.1%
1991	882	+14.0%
2001	836	−5.2%
2011	1,035	+23.8%
2021	1,210	+16.9%

Source: Censuses

== Economy ==
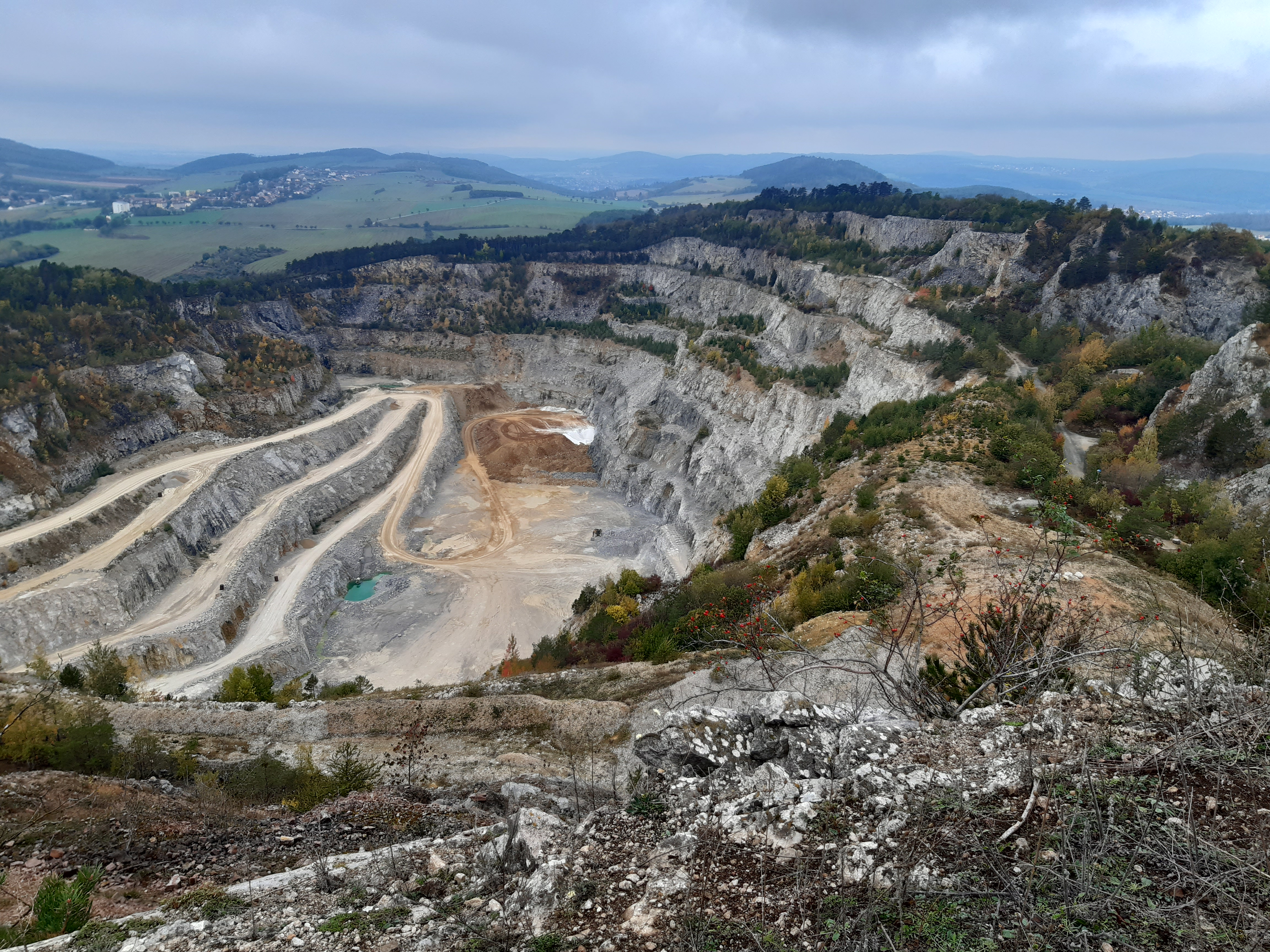
Čertovy schody quarry

The majority of the Čertovy schody limestone quarry is located within the municipality. It is the main producer of limestone in the Czech Republic and the largest and best quality limestone reserves in the country are located here. Limestone quarrying began in 1963. The company Vápenka Čertovy schody (today a part of the Lhoist group), a producer of lime, also has its seat in Tmaň.

== Transport ==
There are no railways or major roads passing through the municipality.

== Sights ==
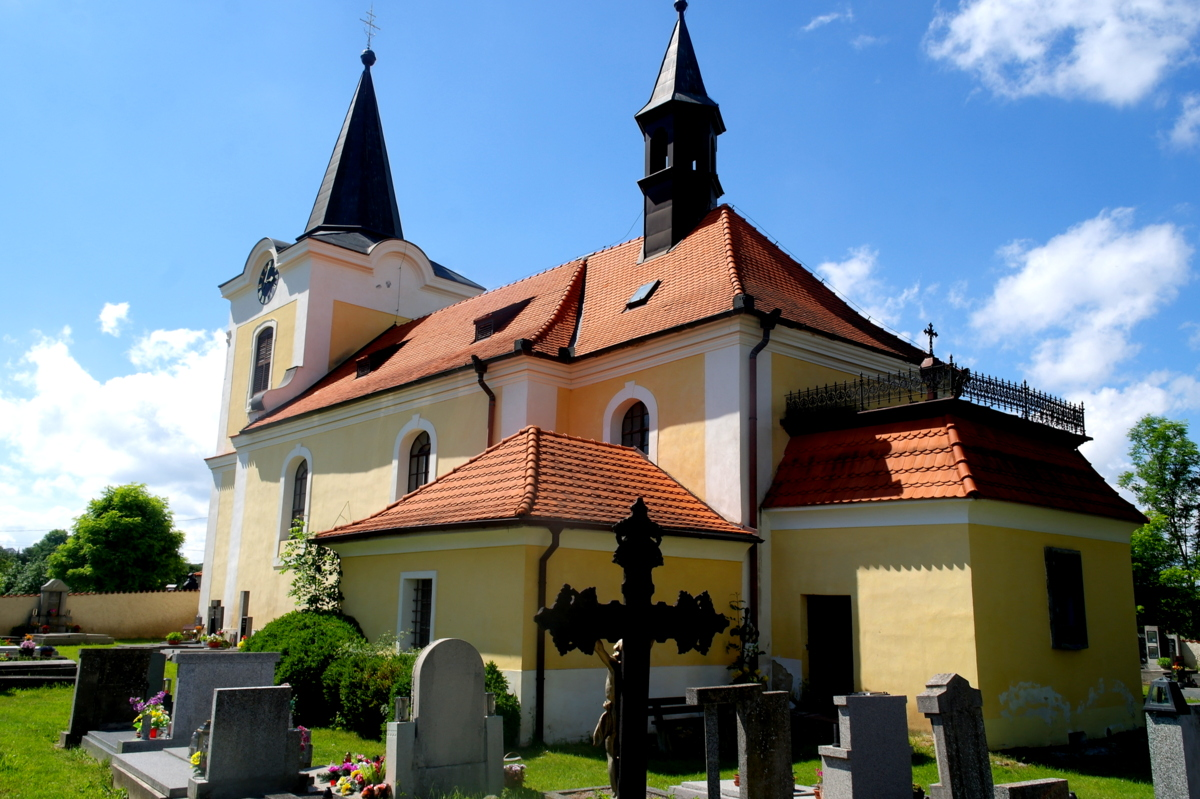
Church of Saint George

The main landmark of Tmaň is the Church of Saint George. Originally a Gothic church, it was rebuilt in the Baroque style in the 18th century and further modified in the 19th century.

The Tmaň Castle was originally a Gothic fortress, rebuilt into a Baroque residence in the 18th century. In the 19th century, it was extended.

The prayer house of the Czechoslovak Hussite Church is an architecturally valuable building. It was built in the Modernist style in 1925–1926.
