= SS Tashmoo =

Tashmoo was the name of two steamships:

- PS Tashmoo, a side-wheeler steamboat that operated between 1899 and 1936 on Great Lakes
- SS Tashmoo (1919), a Design 1023 ship that later served in the Imperial Japanese Navy during World War II as Takusei Maru
