= Monguagon Township, Michigan =

- Former civil township
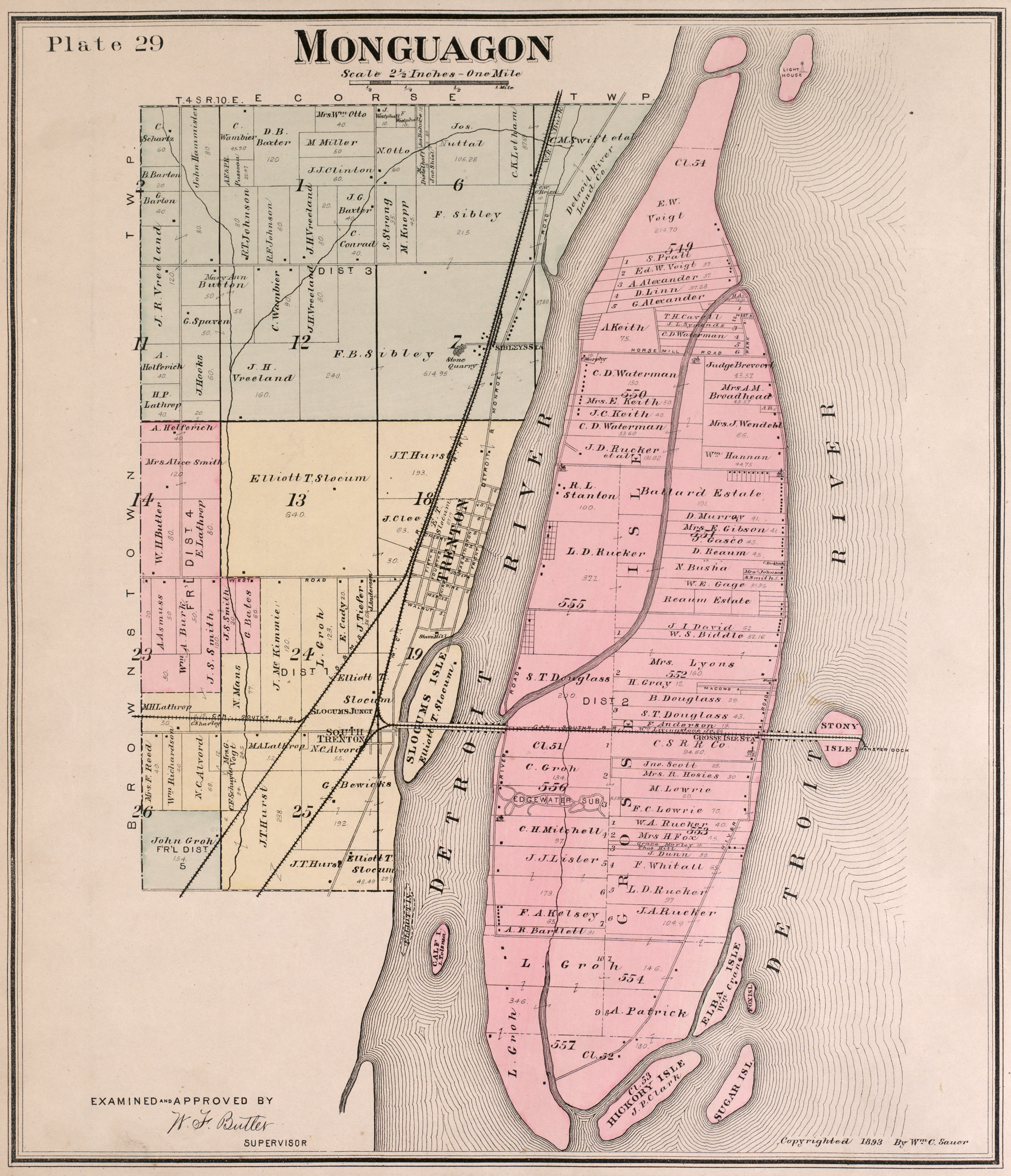
- An 1893 map showing the boundaries of Monguagon Township

- Former location within the state of Michigan Former location within the United States
- Coordinates: 42°09′00″N 83°11′00″W
- Country: United States
- State: Michigan
- County: Wayne
- Settled: 1812
- Organized: 1818
- Dissolved: 1959
- Today part of: Grosse Ile Township, Riverview, Trenton

Mongaugon Township, is a former township of Wayne County in the U.S. state of Michigan. Quarries where gray limestone and celestine associated with calcite, fluorite, gypsum, epsomite, and rarely, sulfur were first worked by the French circa 1749. United States forces aided by Muskrat French defeated United Kingdom forces aided by Native Americans forces at the Battle of Monguagon during the War of 1812.

Mongaugon Township was first settled in 1812 by many former soldiers of the afformentioned War who founded villages that grew to become the cities of Trenton and Riverview, and the civil township of Grosse Ile.

== History ==
=== Battle of Monguagon ===
Before Monguagon's township years, a small conflict of the War of 1812 known as the Battle of Maguaga, also known as the Battle of Monguagon, ensued at then-village Maguaga in present-day Riverview, Michigan.

In the days before the coalition, American troops under the Governor of Michigan Territory, Brigadier General William Hull, marched to Fort Detroit to set up a base to attack on Upper Canada. Hull sent Lieutenant-Colonel James Miller with 280 regulars and 330 Ohio volunteer troops to collect supplies for Hull's garrison that were depoted at the site of the Battle of Brownstown, then escort the pack train back to Detroit. On the return, Miller's path was barred by British Captain Adam Muir.

As American troops advanced on the British troops, men were noticed creeping through the nearby woods, who turned out to be Potawatomi warriors allied to the British, came to join the battle as flanking skirmishers, but immediately retreated. After American troops unleashed their forces onto the British troops, the British fell back, but then remained in their place, waiting for another attack. Miller decided not to advance on the British troops a second time.

The casualties for Miller's force were 18 killed and 64 wounded, while the casualties for Muir's force was 3 killed, 13 wounded, and 2 missing from the 41st Regiment, who returned later and were imprisoned, as well as 1 killed and 2 wounded from the Canadian militia. 2 were killed and 6 were wounded from the Native American contingent.

Miller's troops camped at the nearby woods for two days, not returning for their knapsacks which they had discarded before the attack to fight more effectively, and ignoring orders from General Hull to resume en route to the Rapids, before being ordered to return to Detroit.

=== After battle ===
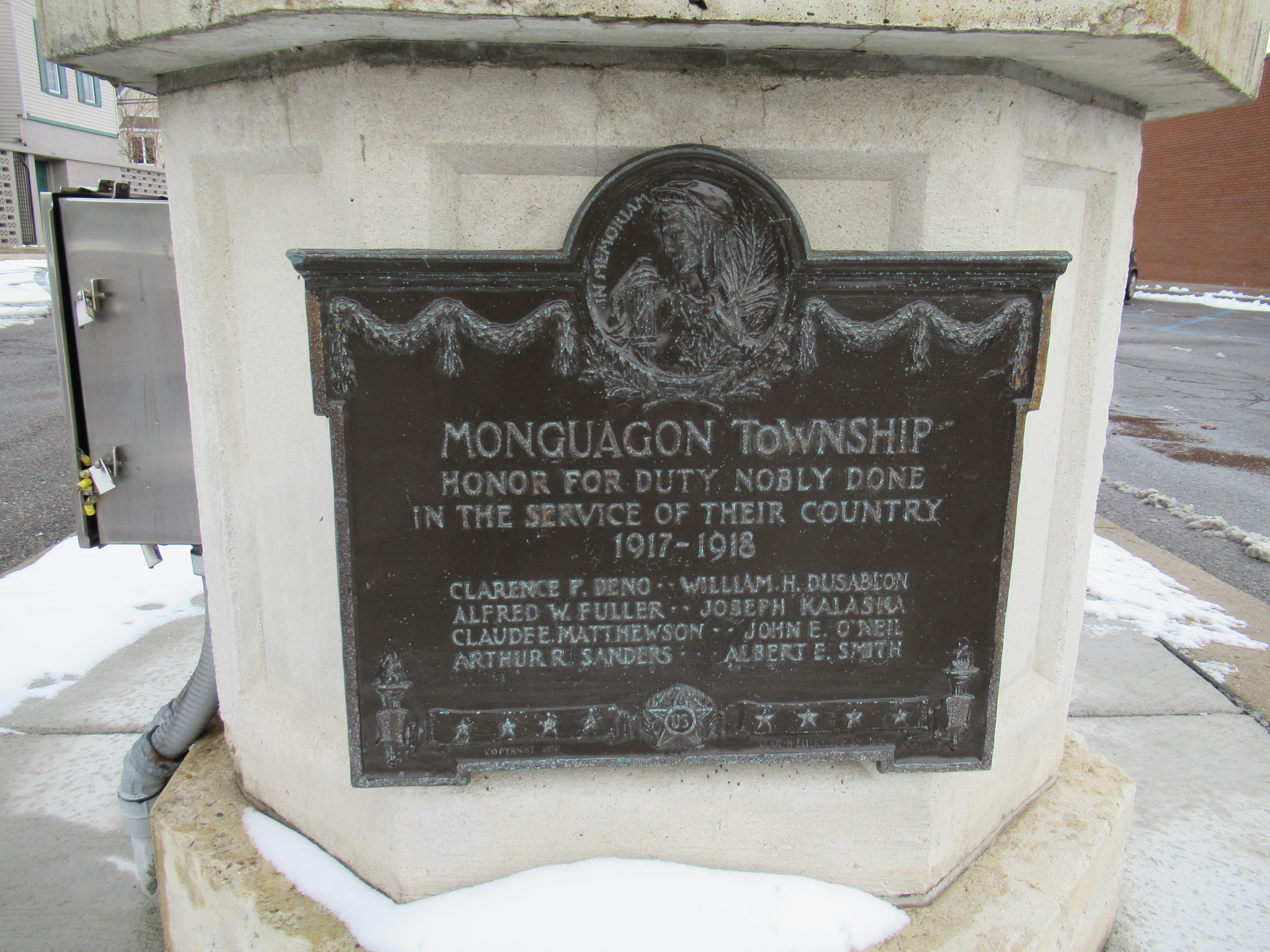
Plaque along W. Jefferson Avenue in the present-day city of Trenton depicted WWI casualties from Monguagon Township

On January 15, 1818, a proclamation by Lewis Cass, Governor of Michigan Territory, established Mongaugon, along with townships of Hamtramck, Huron, St. Clair, and Springwells as townships of Wayne County. These townships were formed under authority initially granted by the Court of General Sessions for the Northwest Territory on November 6, 1790. Under this system, townships were governed by a commissioner.

On April 12, 1827, Cass signed an act that abolished the office of township commissioner, and also established in Wayne County the townships of Brownstown, Bucklin, Detroit, Ecorse, Hamtramck, Huron, Mongaugon, Plymouth and Springwells.

Township government in Mongaugon was organized on May 25, 1827, with the election of Colonel Abram Caleb Truax as supervisor, with several persons elected to other offices. Truax is credited as the founder of Trenton for laying out the village of Truaxton, which became Trenton.

The township created by the act of 1827 consisted of survey township 4 south of range 11 east of the Michigan Meridian and included all of Grosse Ile. By a legislative act of February 16, 1842, the portion of Brownstown Township east of a north–south line through the center of sections 2, 11, 14, 23, and 26 were added to Monguagon Township. Grosse Ile Township was part of Monguagon until 1914 when it organized as a separate township. The cities of Trenton and Riverview incorporated from the township.

Mongaugon was located at approximately 42°9′N 83°11′W and was bounded on the north by Ecorse Township (what is now the southern boundary of the cities of Southgate and Wyandotte). On the west and south, it was bounded by Brownstown Township.

The name Mongaugon is that of a Pottawatomi chief who lived along the Detroit River circa 1755.
