= Grosse Ile Toll Bridge =

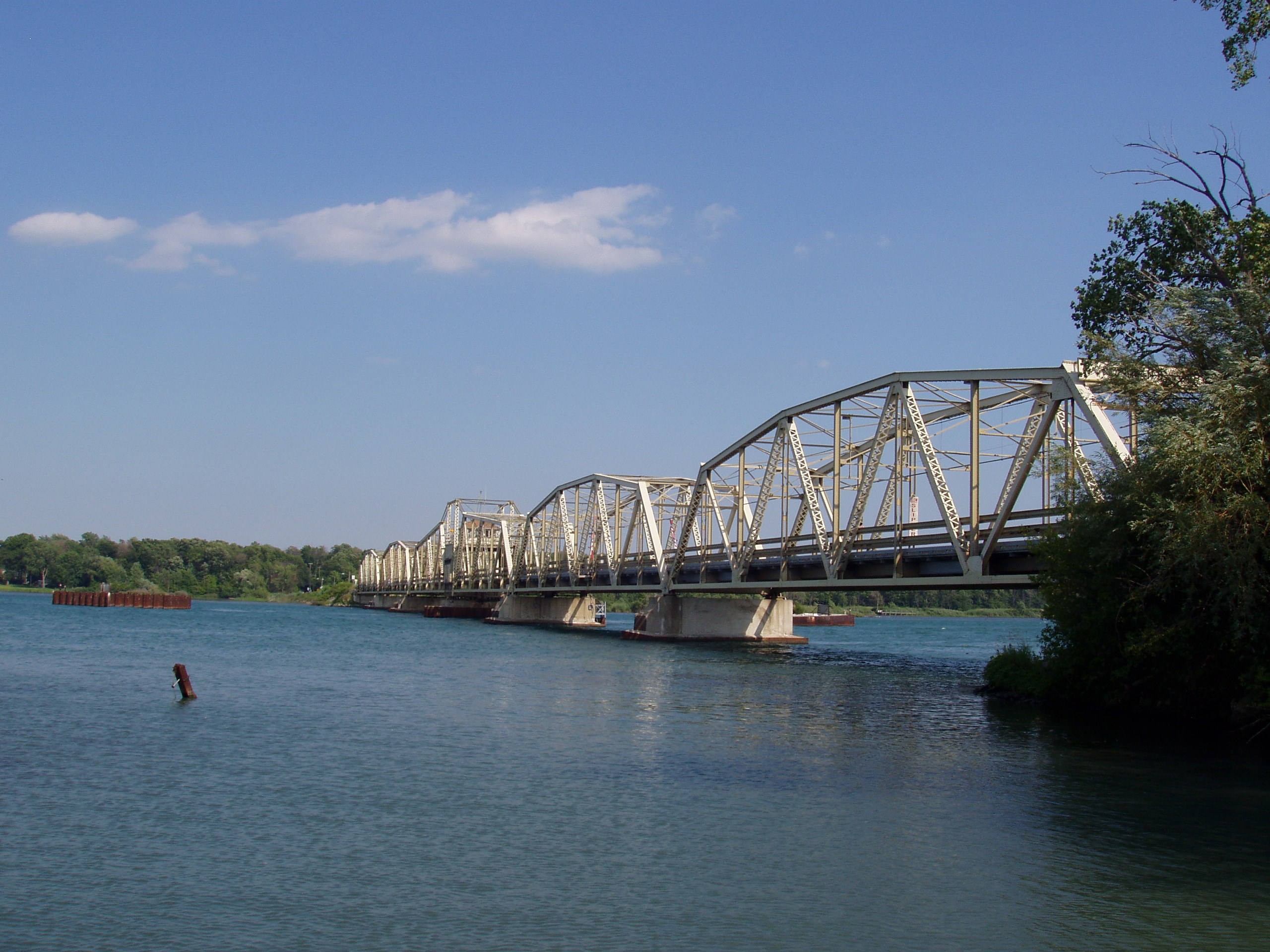
- Coordinates: 42°10′20.9″N 83°9′34.3″W
- Carries: 2 lanes of Bridge Road
- Crosses: Trenton Channel of Detroit River
- Locale: Grosse Ile and Riverview in Wayne County, Michigan,

Characteristics
- Design: Swing bridge

History
- Opened: November 27, 1913

Statistics
- Toll: Cash: $3.50 Credit Card: $4.50

Location
- Interactive map of Grosse Ile Toll Bridge

The Grosse Ile Toll Bridge is a swing bridge that crosses the Trenton Channel of the Detroit River connecting Grosse Ile Township, Michigan to the mainland in Riverview, Michigan which is located in Wayne County, Michigan.

== History ==
The Grosse Ile Toll Bridge was financed, designed and constructed between 1912 and 1913 by the Grosse Ile Bridge Company (GIBC). GIBC was established as a Michigan corporation and bridge company on May 1, 1912, with Grosse Ile land owner Edward W. Voigt as its primary incorporator, majority stockholder and founding president. Voigt directed the construction of the Grosse Ile Toll Bridge and opened the span to the general public on November 27, 1913 (Thanksgiving Day). The Toll Bridge was the first automobile bridge to the island.

Voigt was a German immigrant who became a prominent Detroit-area businessman and entrepreneur. He possessed the majority of the land (approximately 400 acres) on the north end of Grosse Ile, where he owned and maintained the Island Home Stock Farm. Voigt established the GIBC to make it faster and easier to transport his draft horses to and from his farm, as well as to open the island to automobiles.

Because Grosse Ile (part of Monguagon Township at the time) had a population of less than 1,000 in 1913, and because Wayne County had no interest in building an automobile bridge on the north end of the island, local residents supported Voight's plan to build the bridge.

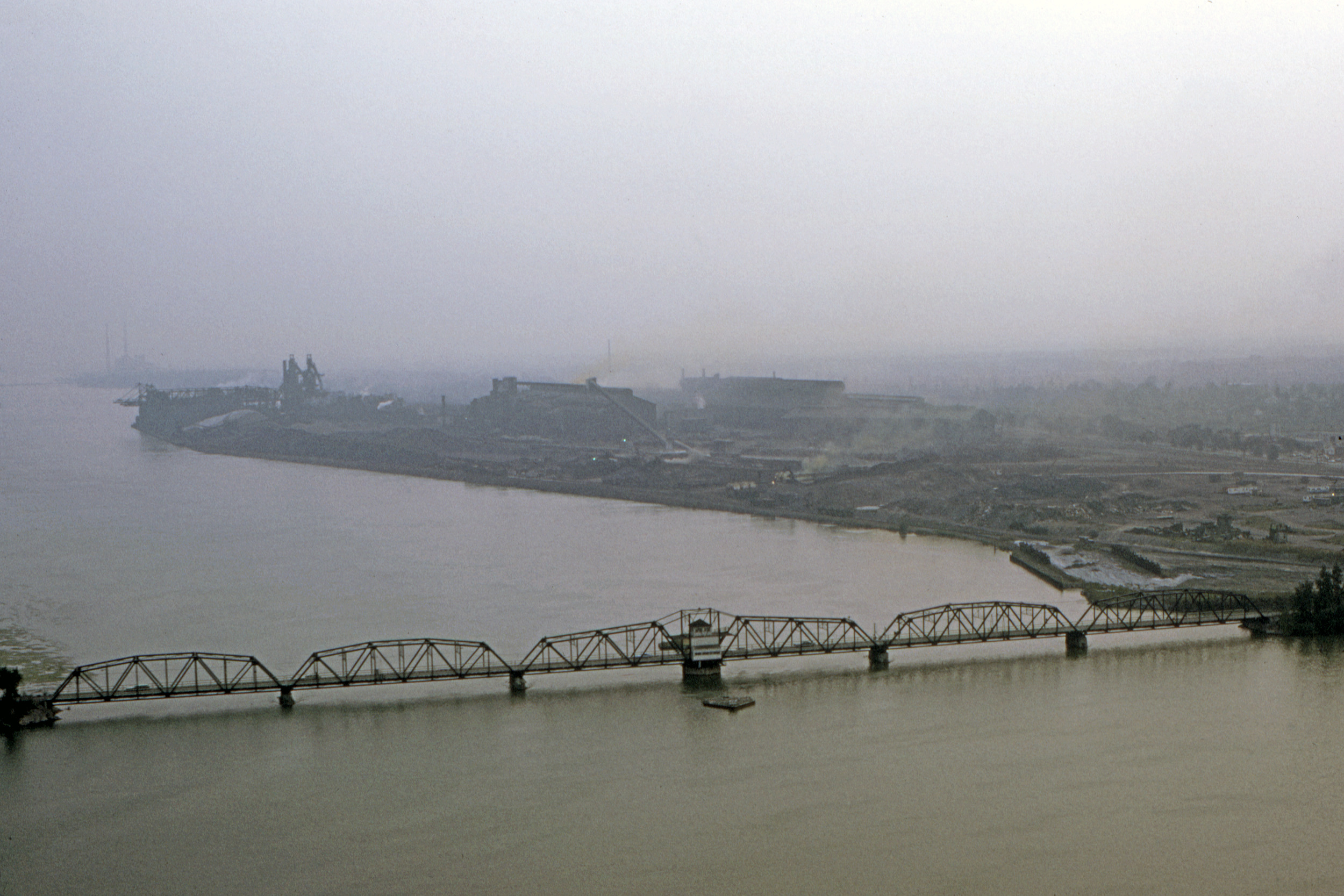
Aerial view in 1969

Since 1913, the GIBC has renovated and expanded the Toll Bridge. It also performed major repairs to the bridge after freighters struck a large section of the span in 1965 and again in 1992. The GIBC replaced the bridge deck in 1986, built a new central swing bearing in 1994, and opened a toll plaza in Riverview in 2004. Funding for the improvements and normal maintenance of the bridge is generated from the user fee toll charged by the GIBC. The one-way toll for crossing the bridge is $3.50 if cash is used, $4.50 if a credit card is used, or $3.00 if a "Bridge Pass" is used. The GIBC has received numerous awards praising its maintenance projects for the Toll Bridge from Michigan-based and national infrastructure and engineering organizations such as the American Society of Civil Engineers, American Consulting Engineers Council, and Consulting Engineers Council of Michigan.

Stewardship for the Toll Bridge and ownership of the GIBC had passed from Voigt to his descendants. Paul J. Smoke, Voigt's great-grandson, was president and owner of the GIBC until 2025.

Ownership of the Grosse Ile Toll Bridge transferred from the Grosse Ile Bridge Company to Grosse Ile Township on March 31, 2025. The township acquired the bridge using proceeds from a voter-approved bond issue, citing the need to ensure long-term maintenance and to enable future upgrades to accommodate heavier vehicles. Following the transfer, the township assumed responsibility for bridge operations, including toll collection systems.

== Tolls ==
The Grosse Ile Toll Bridge tolls are based on number of axles. Two-axle cars pay a toll of $3.50 cash, $4.50 credit, or $3.00 if they use Bridge Pass tag.
