= Grosse Ile (Michigan) =

American island in the Detroit River

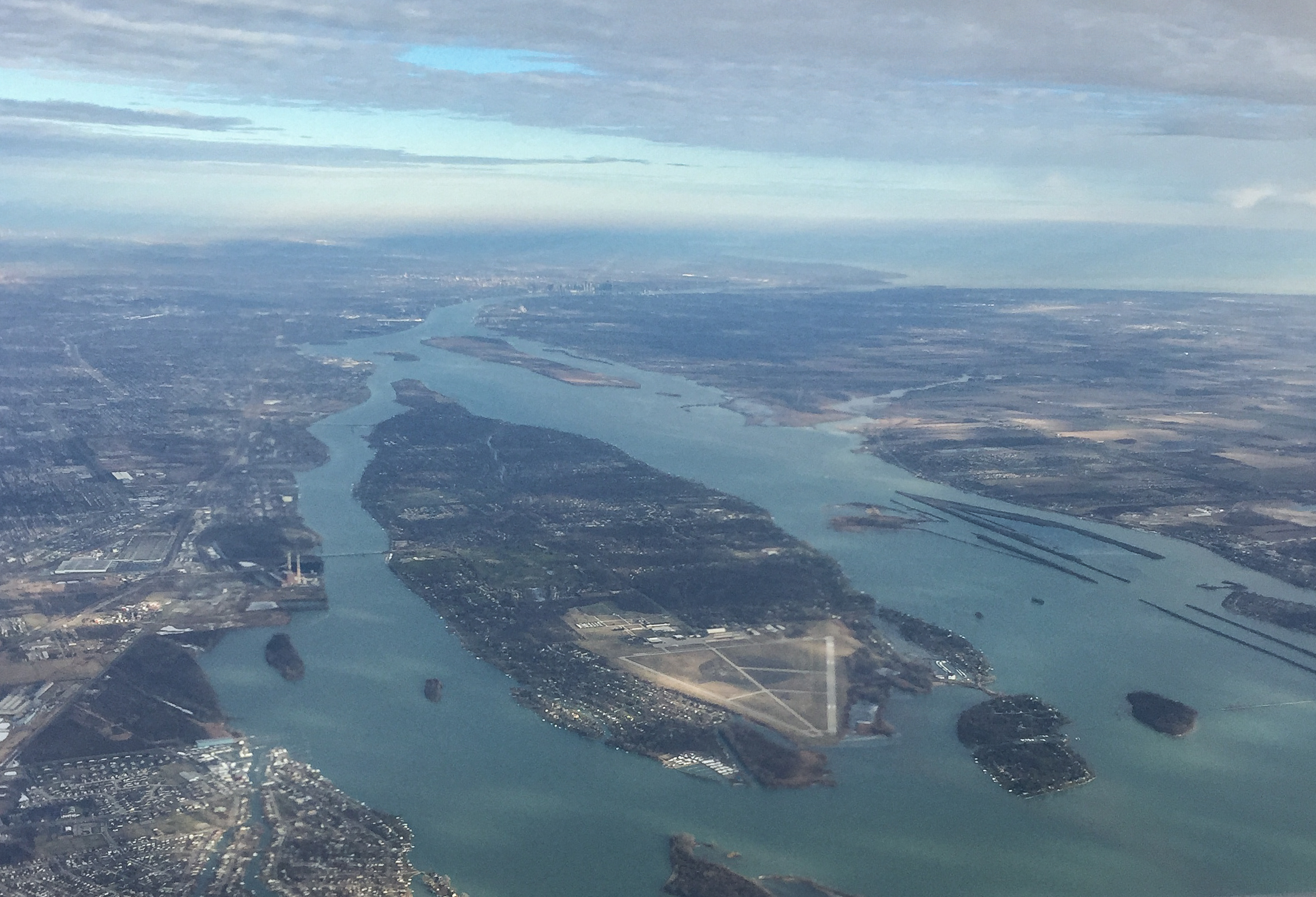
- Aerial view of Grosse Ile in January 2016

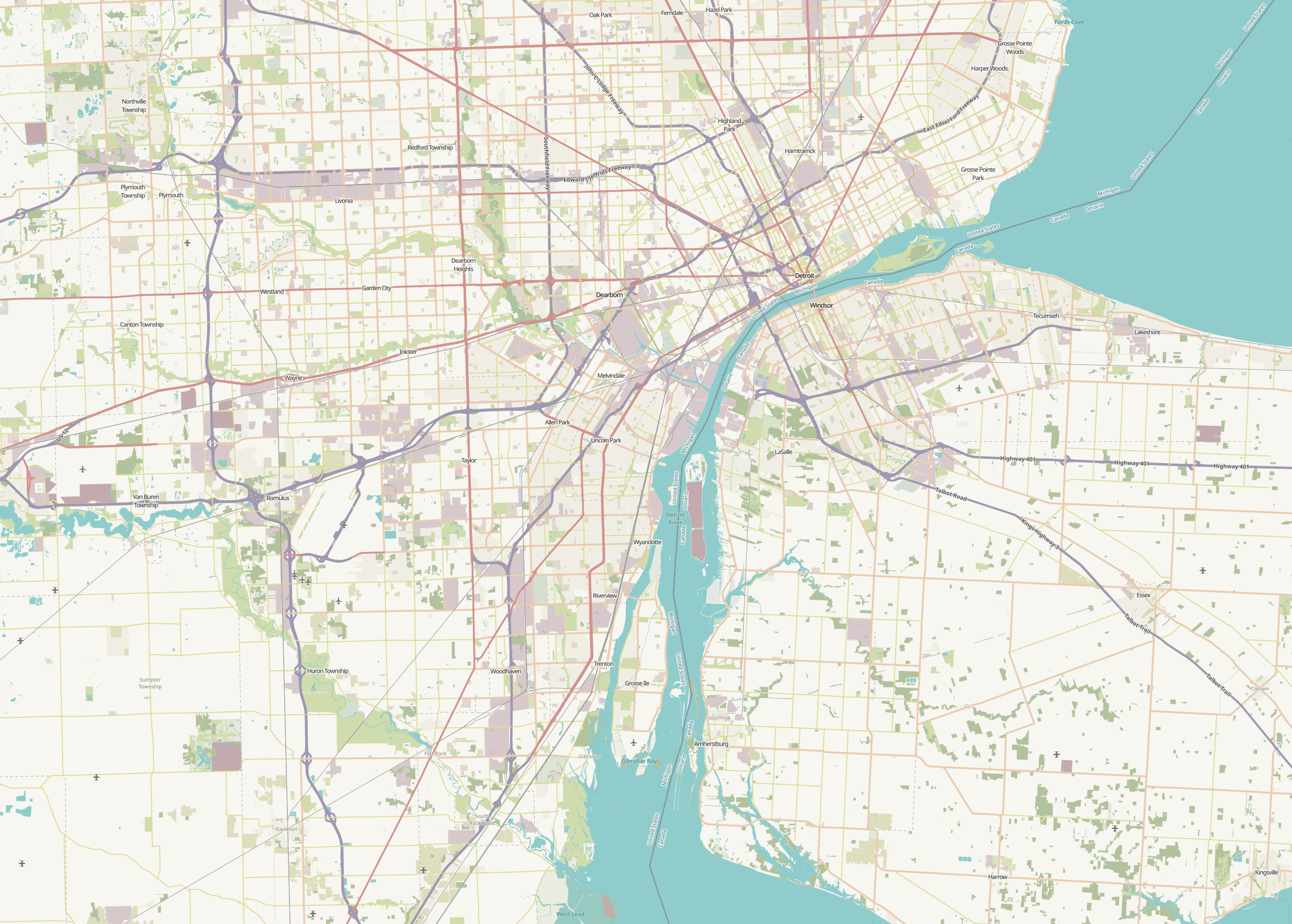
- Location within the State of Michigan Location within the United States Grosse Ile (Michigan) (the United States)

Geography
- Location: Detroit River
- Coordinates: 42°07′48″N 83°09′37″W
- Area: 9.60 sq mi (24.9 km^{2})

Administration
- United States
- State: Michigan
- County: Wayne
- Township: Grosse Ile

Additional information
- Time zone: EST (UTC−5)
  - Summer (DST): EDT (UTC−4)

Grosse Ile (/ˌɡroʊs ˈiːl/ GROHS EEL) is an American island in Wayne County in the U.S. state of Michigan. Located just west of the Canada–United States border in the Detroit River, it is the largest island in the river and the most populous island in the state of Michigan. The island is administered by Grosse Ile Township.

== History ==
The island was first explored and named by French explorers who called it Grosse Île, meaning "large island" in the French language. Originally occupied by Native Americans, the island was given to the early French explorers by the Potawatomi in 1776. The Potawatomi referred to the island as Kitcheminishen. Brothers William and Alexander Macomb, merchants and fur traders from Albany, New York and Detroit, took the island from the Potawatomi, becoming the first European-American owners.

The brothers had the island surveyed in 1819, and it was included into Monguagon Township in 1829. The island remained sparsely populated and an independent community, but it did not gain autonomy until the formation of Grosse Ile Township on October 27, 1914. The island of Grosse Ile is considered an affluent part of the Downriver community just south of the city of Detroit.

== Geography ==
The island is bordered on the west by the Trenton Channel and on the east by the Livingston Channel. The island itself is divided by two canals. The area on the north, known as Hennepin Point, is undeveloped and the site of a historic lighthouse. The Grosse Ile Municipal Airport occupies the southernmost area of the island. Grosse Ile is at the center of the Detroit River International Wildlife Refuge. A variety of river islands are located near Grosse Ile. To the southwest are Calf Island, Swan Island, Celeron Island and Round Island. To the southeast are Meso Island, Hickory Island, and Sugar Island; to the east are Elba Island, Fox Island, Powder House Island and Stony Island, as well as Bois Blanc Island (which is part of Canada).

While the majority of the township's residents live on Grosse Ile, the township itself contains over a dozen smaller islands—some of which are populated. Local residents sometimes refer to Grosse Ile as the Big Island, Main Island, or simply The Island to distinguish it from the township as a whole. The island is connected to the mainland by the Grosse Ile Toll Bridge and the Wayne County Bridge, both of which connect to West Jefferson Avenue.

== See also ==
- Grosse Ile Township, Michigan
- List of islands in the Detroit River
