= Darrin Camilleri =

American politician (born 1992)

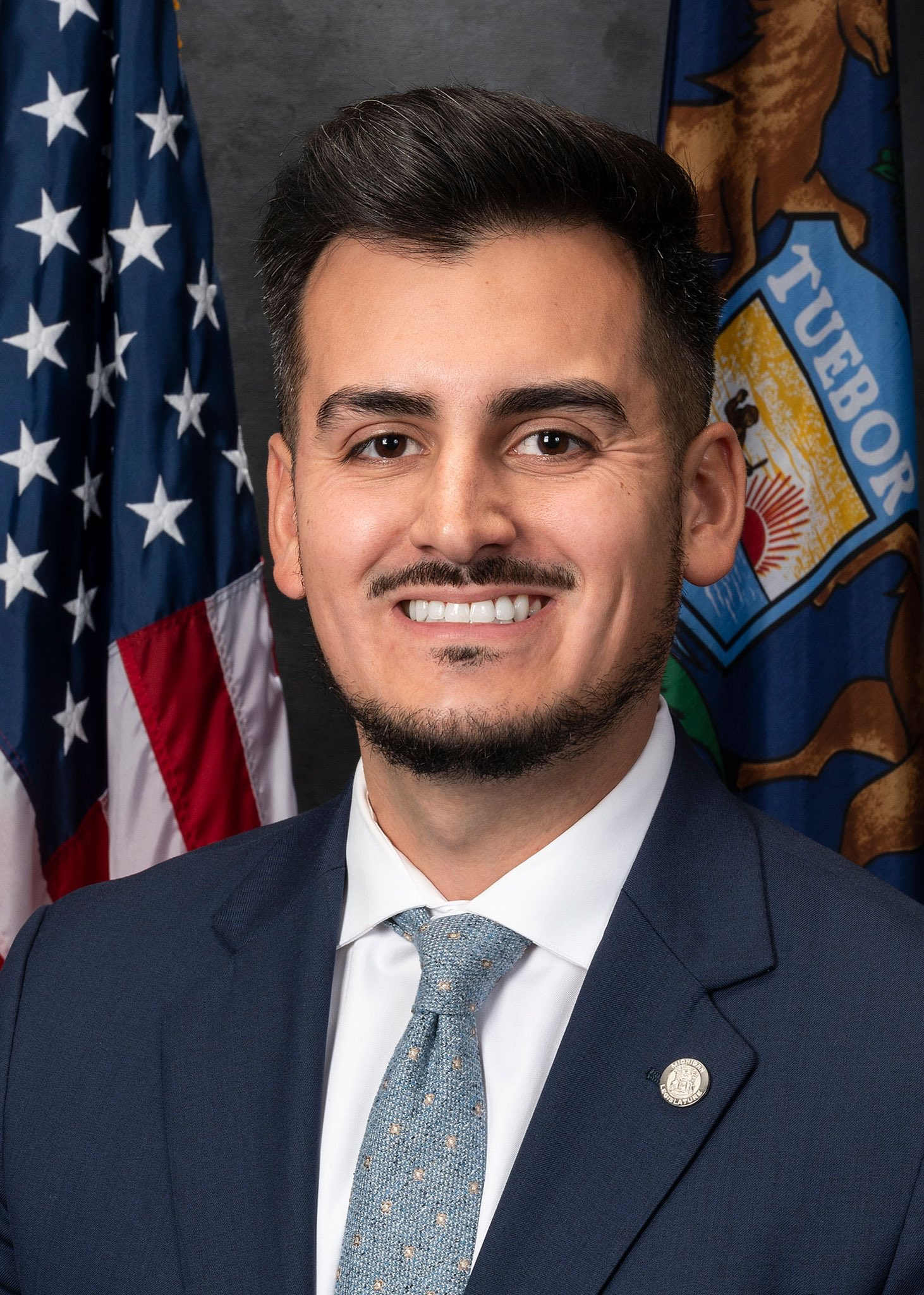

Majority Leader-elect of the Michigan Senate
- Assuming office January 2027
- Succeeding: Winnie Brinks

Member of the Michigan Senate from the 4th district
- Incumbent
- Assumed office January 1, 2023
- Preceded by: Marshall Bullock

Member of the Michigan House of Representatives from the 23rd district
- In office January 1, 2017 – January 1, 2023
- Preceded by: Pat Somerville
- Succeeded by: Jason Morgan

Personal details
- Born: Darrin Quiroz Camilleri; January 28, 1992 (age 34) Dearborn, Michigan, U.S.
- Party: Democratic
- Education: Kalamazoo College (BA)
- Website: State Senate website; Campaign website

Darrin Quiroz Camilleri (born January 28, 1992) is an American politician from Michigan who represents the 4th district in the Michigan Senate since 2023. He previously represented the 23rd District in the Michigan House of Representatives. A member of the Democratic Party, his constituency includes several Downriver communities, including Brownstown, Gibraltar, Grosse Ile, Huron, Trenton and Woodhaven.

== Early life and education ==
Camilleri was born in Dearborn, Michigan, to a Maltese-American immigrant father and a second-generation Mexican-American mother. He is the oldest of three children. After graduating from Gabriel Richard Catholic High School in Riverview, Michigan, he pursued a Bachelor of Arts degree in political science and government from Kalamazoo College, which he received in 2014.

== Professional life ==
During his undergraduate studies, Camilleri served as student body president and worked as an intern for Congressman John Dingell; he credits this experience as "inspir[ing] him to think it was possible to run for an elected office to serve others." For two years after finishing his bachelor's, Camilleri taught social studies at Consortium College Preparatory High School in southwest Detroit through Teach for America.

Camilleri's first political experience came as a member of the Brownstown Parks and Recreation Commission.

=== 2016 election and first State House term ===
He then decided to run for the 23rd District of the Michigan House of Representatives seat being vacated by Republican State Representative Pat Somerville in the 2016 United States Election. Camilleri defeated three other Democratic candidates in the August 2016 primary.

In the 2016 general election, Camilleri faced Republican Bob Howey. Earning the endorsement of – among others – the Detroit Free Press Editorial Board, Camilleri defeated Howey by 323 votes. In defeating Howey, Camilleri became the only Democrat in the state of Michigan to take a seat held by a Republican during that election cycle.

Upon taking his seat in the Michigan State House, Camilleri was chosen by then-Minority Leader Sam Singh to serve as one of two assistant House Democratic Caucus leaders.

=== 2018 election and second State House term ===
In the 2018 election, Camilleri faced Republican Michael Frazier. He defeated Frazier 23,416 votes to 17,935 votes.

In his second term, Camilleri was appointed as House Democratic Whip.

=== 2020 election and third State House term ===
In the 2020 election, Camilleri faced Republican John Poe. He defeated Poe 30,231 votes to 27,300 votes

In his third term, Camilleri served on the Education Committee, the Families, Children, and Seniors Committee, and the Financial Services Committee.

=== 2022 election and first State Senate term ===
On January 10, 2022, Camilleri announced his campaign for Michigan's 4th State Senate District.

On August 4, 2022, he won the Democratic Party nomination unopposed.

In the 2022 general election, Camilleri faced Republican Houston James. He defeated James 64,393 votes to 51,963 votes.

Camilleri was chosen to be assistant majority leader, the first Democrat to hold this position since 1983. He also became Chairman of the PreK-12 School Aid Budget, and was chosen to serve on committees that encompass Elections, Energy, Transportation, and Labor.

He was sworn in on January 1, 2023.

Following the 2026 Michigan Senate election, Camilleri was chosen by the caucus to become the majority leader.
