= Pat Somerville =

American politician

Member of the Michigan House of Representatives from the 23rd district
- In office January 1, 2011 – December 2016
- Preceded by: Deb Kennedy
- Succeeded by: Darrin Camilleri

Personal details
- Born: April 11, 1980 (age 46) Dearborn, Michigan
- Party: Republican
- Education: University of Michigan
- Occupation: Politician

Pat Somerville (born April 11, 1980) is an American politician from Michigan. Somerville was a member of the Michigan House of Representatives from District 23.

== Early life ==
On April 11, 1980, Somerville was born in Dearborn, Michigan. Somerville's grandmother was Patricia Anne Somerville, former mayor of Rochester Hills, Michigan.

== Education ==
In 2003, Somerville earned a Bachelor of Science degree in Aerospace Engineering from the University of Michigan.

== Career ==
Somerville was a manager at Walgreens.

In 2009, Somerville served as the chairman of the Wayne County Young Republicans.

On November 2, 2010, Somerville won the election and became a Republican member of Michigan House of Representatives for District 23. Somerville defeated Deb Kennedy with 53.44% of the votes. On November 6, 2012, as an incumbent, Somerville won the election and continued serving District 23. Somerville defeated Tom Boritzski with 50.49% of the votes. On November 4, 2014, as an incumbent, Somerville won the election and continued serving District 23. Somerville defeated David Haener with 52.12% of the votes.

Somerville represented part of the Down River area of Wayne County. His district includes Grosse Isle, Brownstown Township, Gibraltar, Trenton, Woodhaven and Huron Township.
