= Deb Kennedy =

American politician from Michigan

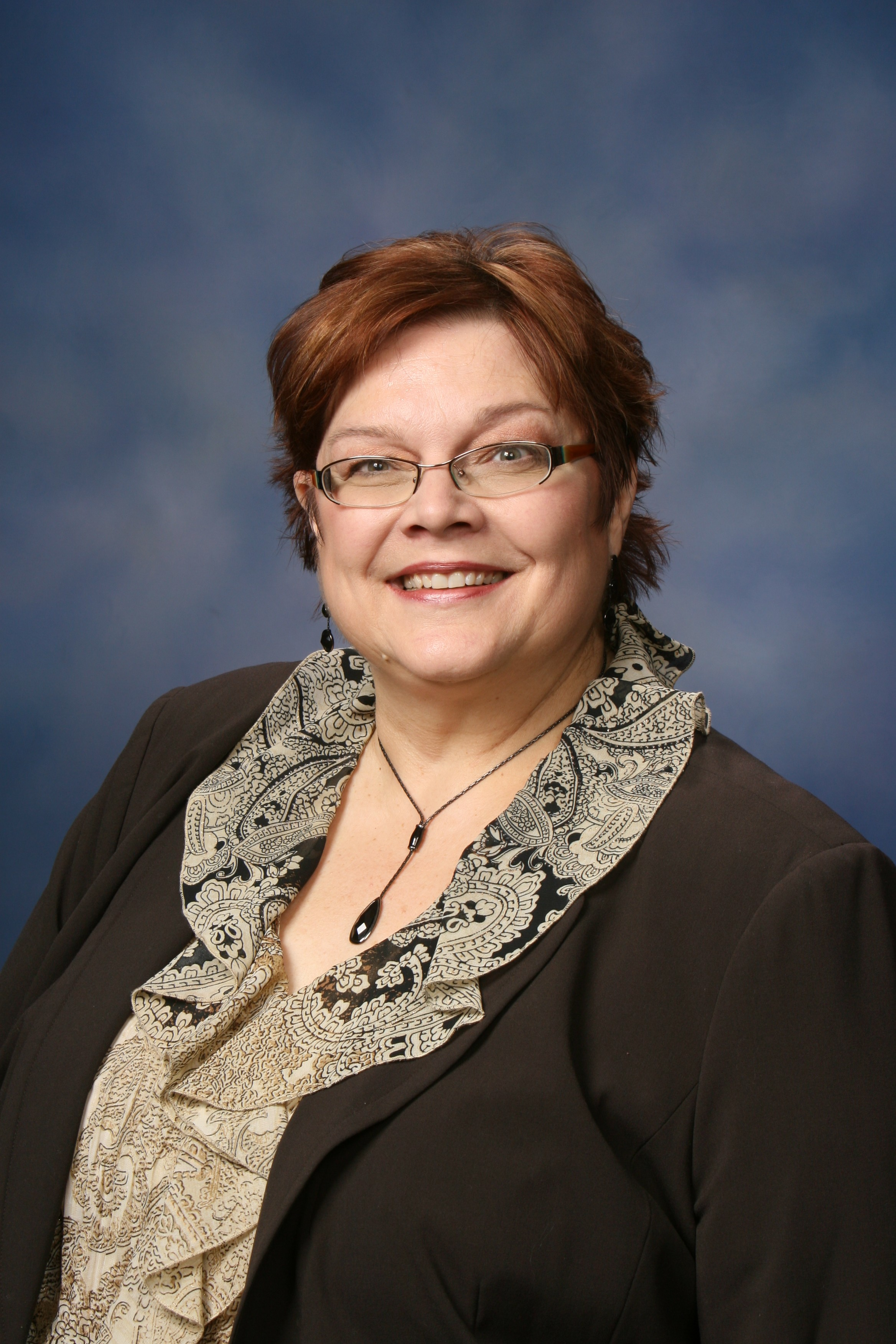

Member of the Michigan House of Representatives from the 23rd district
- In office January 1, 2009 – December 2010
- Preceded by: Kathleen Law
- Succeeded by: Pat Somerville

Personal details
- Born: August 12, 1954 (age 72) Virginia
- Party: Democratic
- Spouse: Alex
- Children: 2
- Occupation: Politician

Deb Kennedy (born August 12, 1954) is the former Democratic State Representative in the Michigan House of Representatives, representing the 23rd District, which covers parts of Wayne County. The 23rd District includes Brownstown, Flat Rock, Gibraltar, Grosse Ile, Huron Township, Rockwood, Sumpter Township, and Woodhaven. She served as the Vice-Chair of the House Committee on Labor, and as a member of the House Committees on Great Lakes and Environment, Intergovernmental & Regional Affairs, and Education.

== Early life and education ==
She earned a bachelor's degree in psychology and sociology from Central Michigan University.

== Career ==
Kennedy, who sold for Mary Kay Cosmetics, began her career for the company as an independent consultant 30 years ago. She also formerly served as an Executive Director for an agency that offered direct human services including a 24-hour crisis telephone hotline, senior transportation, parent aides, and Toys for Tots. Kennedy served as Trustee on the Woodhaven-Brownstown Board of Education and continues to serve on their education foundation board of directors.

Kennedy was a member of the Wyandotte First Presbyterian Church, having served on the church's governing body, and as chair of its strategic planning task force. The church permanently closed in September 2017 after 161 years of service to the community. Kennedy is active in many local charitable organizations and social groups including: Downriver Council for the Arts, Flat Rock Soroptomists, Friends of the Detroit River, Woodhaven Relay for Life, American Association of University Women, and Brownstown Moose. She assisted in the creation of a program that offered free mammogram screenings at a local hospital and worked to relocate Hurricane Katrina victims in Michigan. She also helped prevent a medical waste incinerator from being built in Brownstown.

As State Representative, one of Kennedy's priorities is education so Michigan's children can compete in the 21st century global economy. She also sponsors legislation to encourage the state and businesses to buy American-made products and a bill to ban the use of a hazardous, toxic chemical used as a flame retardant in certain electronics and upholstery.

== 2008 election ==
The general election for Representative in State Legislature of the 23rd District took place on November 4, 2008.

Candidates	Votes	Percent
Neil C. DeBlois (REP)	18,376	40.42
Deb Kennedy (DEM)	26,987	59.35

== Legislation introduced ==
Representative Kennedy has introduced 20 bills.

- House Bill 6070 (Increase mandated state power production declines) to revise the 2008 law mandating that natural gas utilities reduce the amount of energy they provide by .75 percent each year beginning in 2013. The bill would require that beginning in 2015 utilities reduce the amount of gas they provide by 1.75 percent, and by 2.0 percent beginning in 2016.
- House Resolution 251 recognizing April 20, 2010, as Equal Pay Day in the state of Michigan. Passed in the House by voice vote on April 20, 2010.
- House Bill 5812 (Expand “service dog” definition to include other animals) to expand the exception for "service dogs” in the law against bringing animals into a restaurant, and allowing them to be banned from other places of public accommodation. The bill would instead make the exception for “service animals,” defined as any animal trained to perform tasks for a person with disabilities.
- House Bill 5800 (Establish new "unfunded mandate" prevention procedures) to require any lawsuit alleging violation by the state of the 1978 Headlee amendment provision prohibiting the state from imposing unfunded mandates on local governments to be filed in the state Appeals Court, rather than in circuit court. Under current law either is allowed. The bill prohibits the court from requiring the allegations in a suit to be any more specific than is generally required in a civil action, and establishes court procedures for adjudicating the case “as rapidly as possible consistent with achieving justice”.
- House Bill 5699 (Extend statute of limitations for sex crimes against minors ) to extend the statute of limitations for certain criminal sexual conduct offenses committed against minors.
- House Bill 5639 (Revise physical force in schools rules) to prohibit the reasonable use of physical force on a public school student for purposes of maintaining order and control and providing an environment conducive to safety and learning. Instead, force would only be allowed in an emergency situation when a student's unpredictable, spontaneous behavior causes a threat of imminent, serious physical harm, and can't be immediately prevented by any less restrictive measure. Reasonable physical force would be allowed to break up a fight, take away a weapon, or to remove or hold for a brief time a student in order to prevent impulsive behavior that threatens his or her safety. The bill would explicitly allow the “brief holding by an adult in order to calm or comfort”.
- House Joint Resolution MM (Earmark new garbage tax revenue) to place before voters in the next general election a Constitutional amendment to place in the constitution the distribution formula for the money collected under the $7.50 per ton landfill tipping fee (tax) proposed by House Bill 5558, or by similar bills. Most of the money would be distributed to local governments for recycling programs.
- House Bill 5510 (Revise kindergarten age requirement) to allow – but not require – a child who reaches age 5 before September 1 to enroll in a public school kindergarten. Under current law the cut-off is December 1. This bill amends that law that allows a public school to collect state funding for students from age 5 through age 19.
- House Resolution 120 to memorialize the Congress of the United States to enact the Prevention First Act to increase access to birth control to prevent unintended pregnancies and reduce the need for abortions.
- House Bill 5049 (Revise solid waste transfer facility licensure detail) to clarify that solid waste transfer facilities that come under an exemption from state construction permit and operating license requirements because they are limited to certain quantities of waste must only accept waste that is “uncompacted”.
- House Concurrent Resolution 20 calling on Governor Granholm to divest all state money from certain hedge funds refusing to accept a settlement on the Chrysler bonds they hold and urging other states to divest their holdings in these hedge funds, should these hedge funds fail to agree on a bond settlement before today's deadline on concluding an agreement. Passed in the House (75 to 34) on April 30, 2009.
- House Resolution 84 (Assert that "women are paid only 78 cents for every dollar a man is paid") to profess an assertion that "women are paid only 78 cents for every dollar a man is paid," and an assertion that "according to the AFL-CIO, Michigan is ranked 45th in the United States for wage parity with Michigan women paid only 72 cents for every dollar a man is paid," and "proclaim April 28, 2009, as Equal Pay Day in the state of Michigan". Passed in the House (108 to 1) on April 28, 2009.
- House Bill 4818 (Authorize “green chemistry” business tax breaks and subsidies) to authorize Michigan Economic Growth Act business tax breaks for “green chemistry” projects, defined as ones that “design chemical products or processes that reduce or eliminate the use or generation of hazardous substances, and develop safer bio-based chemicals and materials”. Passed in the House (100 to 9) on May 19, 2009.
- House Bill 4772 (Exempt Employment Relations Commission from Open Meetings Act) to exempt meetings of the Michigan Employment Relations Commission from the Open Meetings Act, which requires all meetings of a public body to be open to the public. The MERC is empowered to issue authoritative rulings and orders that deem the actions of one side or the other in a labor dispute to be unfair labor practices prohibited by the state's labor law.
- House Bill 4795 (Prohibit personal identifying information in certain court orders) to prohibit “orders of filiation” and related paternity suit court documents from containing personal identifying information other than a person's name and address, with some exceptions. “Personal identifying information” includes a person's telephone number, driver license or state personal identification card number, social security number, workplace and more.
- House Bill 4718 (Authorize subsidies for selected auto industry suppliers) to revise the Michigan Economic Growth Authority Act (MEGA) to allow the auto industry supplier subsidies authorized by House Bill 4126.
- House Bill 4699 (Ban deca-BDEs) to prohibit the manufacture or distribution of products containing decabromodiphenyl ethers (deca-BDEs), which are a commonly used flame retardant for electronics, furniture, mattresses, etc. Passed in the House (94 to 6) on January 27, 2010.
- House Resolution 41 to urge the state of Michigan to ensure that the economic stimulus funding in Michigan be spent on American-made materials to the greatest extent possible. Passed in the House by voice vote on March 26, 2009.
- House Bill 4544 (“Corporate Responsibility” standards for state tax breaks & contracts) to require a firm eligible for obsolete property rehabilitation tax breaks to be in compliance with the corporate responsibility standards proposed by House Bill 4553. Passed in the House (108 to 0) on March 25, 2010.
- House Bill 4317 (Allow retroactive lawsuits against FDA approved drugs) to allow retroactive lawsuits back to 1996 to be filed for three years against drug makers for drugs approved by the U.S. Food And Drug Administration (FDA) that were sold in Michigan since 1996. The bill is tie-barred to House Bill 4044, which would repeal a 1996 tort reform law under which such lawsuits were prohibited over FDA approved drugs. Passed in the House (56 to 53) on March 26, 2009.

Representative Kennedy has introduced 2 amendments.

- A substitute to 2009 House Bill 4699 (Ban deca-BDEs) to replace the previous version of the bill with one that revises details but does not change the substance of the bill as previously described. The substitute failed in the House by voice vote on January 27, 2010.
- An amendment to 2009 House Bill 4699 (Ban deca-BDEs) to require sellers or manufacturers of the banned products in Michigan to submit annual reports prior to when the total ban goes into effect detailing the amount they have made or sold nationwide during the year. The amendment passed in the House by voice vote on January 27, 2010.

== Personal life ==
A long-time resident of Brownstown Township, Kennedy and her husband, Alex, have been married for 32 years and have raised two sons together.
