= Michigan's 23rd House of Representatives district =

American legislative district

Michigan's 23rd State House of Representatives district
Representative
Jason Morgan; D–Ann Arbor
- Demographics: 70.7% White; 3.8% Black; 4.7% Hispanic; 15.7% Asian; 0.1% Native American; 0.3% Other; 4.8% Multiracial
- Population (2024): 89,255

Michigan's 23rd House of Representatives district is a legislative district within the Michigan House of Representatives located in the counties of Oakland, Washtenaw, and Wayne. The district was created in 1965, when the Michigan Supreme Court ordered the reapportionment of state legislative districts from a county-based system to a proportional one following the Supreme Court case Reynolds v. Sims. It is currently represented by Democrat Jason Morgan of Ann Arbor.

== List of representatives ==
Representative	Party	Years	Residence	Notes
Maxcine Young	Democratic	1965–1966	Detroit	Reapportioned from the former Wayne County, 2nd district.
Jackie Vaughn III	Democratic	1967–1972	Detroit	Redistricted to the 18th district.
Hal Walter Ziegler	Republican	1973–1974	Jackson	Redistricted from the 50th district.
Michael H. Conlin	Republican	1975–1978	Jackson	
Mary Keith Ballantine	Republican	1979–1982	Jackson	
Philip E. Hoffman	Republican	1983–1992	Horton (Note: Horton is an unincorporated community within the boundaries of Hanover Township.)	Redistricted to the 65th district.
Vincent "Joe" Porreca	Democratic	1993–1996	Trenton	Redistricted from the 27th district.
George W. Mans	Democratic	1997–2002	Trenton	Term limited.
Kathleen Law	Democratic	2003–2008	Gibraltar	Term limited.
Deb Kennedy	Democratic	2009–2010	Brownstown Township	
Pat Somerville	Republican	2011–2016	New Boston	Term limited.
Darrin Camilleri	Democratic	2017–2022	Brownstown Township	Term limited.
Jason Morgan	Democratic	2023–present	Ann Arbor	

== Historical district boundaries ==
Map	Description	Apportionment Plan	Notes
	Wayne County (part): Detroit (part)	1964 Apportionment Plan	
	Ingham County (part): Stockbridge Township; Jackson County (part): Excluding; Blackman Township; Concord Township; Hanover Township; Jackson (part); Leoni Township; Napoleon Township; Parma Township; Pulaski Township; Sandstone Township; Spring Arbor Township (part); Springport Township; Summit Township (part); Tompkins Township; Washtenaw County (part): Ann Arbor (part); Bridgewater Township; Dexter Township; Freedom Township; Lima Township; Lodi Township; Lyndon Township; Manchester Township; Northfield Township; Saline Township; Scio Township; Sharon Township; Sylvan Township; Webster Township	1972 Apportionment Plan	
	Ingham County (part): Leslie; Leslie Township; Jackson County (part): Blackman Township; Columbia Township; Grass Lake Township; Hanover Township; Henrietta Township; Leoni Township; Liberty Township; Napoleon Township; Norvell Township; Rives Township; Sandstone Township; Tompkins Township; Waterloo Township	1982 Apportionment Plan	
	Wayne County (part): Brownstown Township; Flat Rock; Gibraltar; Grosse Ile Township; Huron Township; Rockwood; Taylor (part); Trenton; Woodhaven	1992 Apportionment Plan	
	Wayne County (part): Brownstown Township; Flat Rock; Gibraltar; Grosse Ile Township; Huron Township; Rockwood; Sumpter Township; Woodhaven	2001 Apportionment Plan	
	Wayne County (part): Brownstown Township; Gibraltar; Grosse Ile Township; Huron Township; Trenton; Woodhaven	2011 Apportionment Plan	
	Oakland County (part): Lyon Township (part); South Lyon; Washtenaw County (part): Ann Arbor (part); Ann Arbor Township (part); Salem Township; Superior Township (part); Wayne County (part): Northville Township (part); Plymouth Township (part)	2021 Apportionment Plan	

== Recent elections ==
=== 2020s ===
2026 Michigan House of Representatives election
Party	Candidate	Votes	%
Democratic	Jason Morgan (incumbent)	28,336	66.64
Republican	Miriam Corvino	13,672	32.15
Green	Christina Marudas	516	1.21
Total votes		42,524	100
Democratic hold			

2024 Michigan House of Representatives election
Party	Candidate	Votes	%
Democratic	Jason Morgan (incumbent)	29,913	61.51
Republican	David Stamp	17,486	35.96
Green	Christina Marudas	1,234	2.54
Total votes		48,633	100
Democratic hold			

2022 Michigan House of Representatives election
Party	Candidate	Votes	%
Democratic	Jason Morgan	24,257	65.1
Republican	Richard L. Sharland	13,004	34.9
Total votes		37,261	100
Democratic hold			

2020 Michigan House of Representatives election
Party	Candidate	Votes	%
Democratic	Darrin Camilleri (incumbent)	30,231	52.55
Republican	John Poe	27,300	47.45
Total votes		57,531	100
Democratic hold			

=== 2010s ===
2018 Michigan House of Representatives election
Party	Candidate	Votes	%
Democratic	Darrin Camilleri (incumbent)	23,925	56.26
Republican	Michael Frazier	18,603	43.74
Total votes		42,528	100
Democratic hold			

2016 Michigan House of Representatives election
Party	Candidate	Votes	%
Democratic	Darrin Camilleri	24,100	50.34
Republican	Bob Howey	23,777	49.66
Total votes		47,877	100
Democratic gain from Republican			

2014 Michigan House of Representatives election
Party	Candidate	Votes	%
Republican	Pat Somerville (incumbent)	16,060	52.12
Democratic	David Haener	14,754	47.88
Total votes		30,814	100
Republican hold			

2012 Michigan House of Representatives election
Party	Candidate	Votes	%
Republican	Pat Somerville (incumbent)	22,810	50.49
Democratic	Tom Boritzki	22,371	49.51
Total votes		45,181	100
Republican hold			

2010 Michigan House of Representatives election
Party	Candidate	Votes	%
Republican	Pat Somerville	15,927	53.44
Democratic	Deb Kennedy (incumbent)	13,877	46.56
Total votes		29,804	100
Republican gain from Democratic			

=== 2000s ===
2008 Michigan House of Representatives election
Party	Candidate	Votes	%
Democratic	Deb Kennedy	26,987	59.49
Republican	Neil C. DeBlois	18,376	40.51
Total votes		45,363	100
Democratic hold			

2006 Michigan House of Representatives election
Party	Candidate	Votes	%
Democratic	Kathleen Law (incumbent)	21,636	63.05
Republican	Linda Bostic	12,677	36.95
Total votes		34,313	100
Democratic hold			

2004 Michigan House of Representatives election
Party	Candidate	Votes	%
Democratic	Kathleen Law (incumbent)	24,004	54.64
Republican	Bill Vollenweider	19,202	43.71
Libertarian	Richard J. Secula	727	1.65
Total votes		43,933	100
Democratic hold			

2002 Michigan House of Representatives election
Party	Candidate	Votes	%
Democratic	Kathleen Law	13,430	49.46
Republican	Douglas W. Jones	13,171	48.51
Libertarian	Richard J. Secula	552	2.03
Total votes		27,153	100
Democratic hold			

2000 Michigan House of Representatives election
Party	Candidate	Votes	%
Democratic	George W. Mans (incumbent)	21,914	51.13
Republican	Burl C. Adkins	19,631	45.8
Reform	Kenneth Johnson	726	1.69
Libertarian	Richard J. Secula	588	1.37
Total votes		42,859	100
Democratic hold			

=== 1990s ===
1998 Michigan House of Representatives election
Party	Candidate	Votes	%
Democratic	George W. Mans (incumbent)	17,799	61.04
Republican	Elizabeth Kalabus	10,779	36.97
Libertarian	Gary R. Lloyd	582	2
Total votes		29,160	100
Democratic hold			
