= South Detroit =

South Detroit may refer to:

- South Detroit township, Brown County, South Dakota
- South Detroit, a hypothetical place mentioned in the song "Don't Stop Believin'"
  - Downriver, a suburban region southwest of Detroit, Michigan, sometimes suggested as the location mentioned in the song
- South Detroit, Ontario, a proposed name for the city of Windsor

== See also ==
- Neighborhoods in Detroit, Michigan
