= John Schreiber (baseball) =

American baseball player (born 1994)

Free agent
- Pitcher
- Born: March 5, 1994 (age 32); Wyandotte, Michigan, U.S.
- Bats: Right Throws: Right

MLB debut
- August 9, 2019, for the Detroit Tigers

MLB statistics (through 2026 season)
- Win–loss record: 17–16
- Earned run average: 3.58
- Strikeouts: 313
- Stats at Baseball Reference

Teams
- Detroit Tigers (2019–2020); Boston Red Sox (2021–2023); Kansas City Royals (2024–2026); New York Yankees (2026)

John Robert Schreiber (born March 5, 1994) is an American professional baseball pitcher who is a free agent. He has played in Major League Baseball (MLB) for the Detroit Tigers, Boston Red Sox, Kansas City Royals, and New York Yankees. Listed at 6 feet 2 inches (1.88 m) and 210 pounds (95 kg), he throws and bats right-handed.

== Career ==
=== Amateur career ===
Schreiber was born in Wyandotte, Michigan, raised in nearby Rockwood, and attended Carlson High School in Gibraltar. He played college baseball at Henry Ford Community College in Dearborn for two seasons, and then transferred to the University of Northwestern Ohio for two seasons.

Schreiber played collegiate summer baseball for the Kalamazoo Growlers of the Northwoods League in 2014, soon becoming the first Growler alumnus to play in the majors.

=== Detroit Tigers ===
The Detroit Tigers selected Schreiber in the 15th round of the 2016 MLB draft, where he signed for a $6,000 bonus. After signing with Detroit, he was assigned to the Connecticut Tigers, where he went 2–3 in 18 games with a 2.76 ERA and 1.09 WHIP. In 2017, he played for the West Michigan Whitecaps where he improved to a 5–1 record and 0.54 ERA in 27 relief appearances. Opponents only batted .147 off Schreiber and he held opposing batters to a 0.66 WHIP. Schreiber then advanced to the Double-A Erie SeaWolves in 2018, where he finished with a 2.48 ERA and 18 saves in 23 opportunities, while pitching in 49 games total over the course of the year. He began 2019 in Erie, but after allowing just two runs in seven innings, and with opponents hitting .154 off him, he was called up to the Triple-A Toledo Mud Hens.

On August 8, 2019, the Tigers selected Schreiber's contract and promoted him to the major leagues. He made his debut on August 9, allowing one run over 2/3 of an inning. Schreiber earned his first major league win on September 7, pitching the final 2/3 of an inning in the Tigers' 5–4 extra innings victory over the Oakland Athletics. He pitched 13 innings for the 2019 Tigers, compiling a 6.23 ERA with 19 strikeouts.

With the 2020 Tigers, Schreiber appeared in 15 games, compiling a 0–1 record with a 6.32 ERA and 14 strikeouts in 15 2/3 innings pitched. On February 12, 2021, Schreiber was designated for assignment following the signing of Nomar Mazara.

=== Boston Red Sox ===
On February 18, 2021, Schreiber was claimed off waivers by the Boston Red Sox. On March 30, the Red Sox designated Schreiber for assignment. On April 2, he was sent outright to the team's alternate training site. After pitching in Triple-A with the Worcester Red Sox, Schreiber was added to Boston's active roster on September 1, then appeared in a single game, allowing one run in three innings. He was returned to Worcester on September 6 and removed from the 40-man roster. In 33 appearances (eight starts) with Worcester, Schreiber compiled a 2.71 ERA and 3–3 record while striking out 65 batters in 66 1/3 innings.

Schreiber began the 2022 season with Worcester, and was added to Boston's active roster on April 25. He was returned to Worcester on April 29 and removed from the team's 40-man roster. Schreiber was recalled to Boston on May 6 when Rich Hill was placed on the COVID-19 injured list. On May 10, Schreiber earned his first major-league save, throwing two shutout innings against the Atlanta Braves. In 64 relief appearances with Boston during 2022, Schreiber posted a 4–4 record with eight saves and 2.22 ERA while striking out 74 batters in 65 innings, breaking out and becoming an important member of the Red Sox bullpen.

Schreiber began the 2023 season as a member of Boston's bullpen. On May 16, he was placed on the injured list with a right teres major strain. He was transferred to the 60-day injured list on June 22. On July 25, Schreiber was activated from the injured list and served as the opener in the team's game against the Atlanta Braves later that day. He pitched one inning, letting up a run. In 46 outings for Boston, Schreiber recorded a 3.86 ERA with 53 strikeouts across 46 2/3 innings pitched.

=== Kansas City Royals ===
On February 17, 2024, the Red Sox traded Schreiber to the Kansas City Royals in exchange for minor-league pitcher David Sandlin. While on the Royals in 2026, he had a 1–3 win–loss record to go along with a 3.65 ERA with 36 strikeouts, one save, and 14 holds over 55 games and 49 1/3 innings.

On August 29, 2026, Schreiber was placed on waivers by the Royals.

=== New York Yankees ===
On August 31, 2026, the New York Yankees claimed Schreiber off waivers along with the rest of his remaining $3.75 million contract.
