= Gibraltar School District =

School district in Michigan

Address
- 19370 Vreeland Road Woodhaven, Wayne, Michigan, 48183; United States

District information
- Grades: Pre-Kindergarten-12
- Superintendent: Amy Conway
- Schools: 7
- Budget: $58,425,000 2022-2023 expenditures
- NCES District ID: 2615870

Students and staff
- Students: 3,651 (2024-2025)
- Teachers: 196.43 (on an FTE basis) (2024-2025)
- Staff: 400.48 FTE (2024-2025)
- Student–teacher ratio: 18.59 (2024-2025)

Other information
- Website: www.gibdist.net

Gibraltar School District is a public school district in the Downriver area of Metro Detroit. It serves Gibraltar, Michigan and parts of Brownstown Township, Flat Rock, Rockwood, and Woodhaven.

== History ==
The first school in Gibraltar was built in 1836. Parsons Elementary was the next school built, in 1953.

Carlson High School was named for Oscar A. Carlson. Its first yearbook was published in 1965.

== Schools ==
Schools in Gibraltar School District
School	Address	Notes
Chapman Elementary	31500 Olmstead Rd., Rockwood	Grades PreK-5
Early Childhood Center	21762 Harding, Gibraltar	Preschool
Downriver STEM at Weiss	26631 Reaume St., Woodhaven	Grades PreK-5
Hunter Elementary	21320 Roche St., Brownstown	Grades PreK-5
Parsons Elementary	14473 Middle Gibraltar Rd., Gibraltar	Grades PreK-5
Shumate Middle School	30448 West Jefferson, Gibraltar	Grades 6–8
Carlson High School	30550 West Jefferson Ave., Gibraltar	Grades 9–12
