= George Mans =

American football player, coach and politician from Michigan

Member of the Michigan House of Representatives from the 23rd district
- In office January 1997 – December 2002
- Succeeded by: Kathleen Law

Personal details
- Born: January 31, 1940 Detroit, Michigan, U.S
- Died: December 20, 2017 (aged 77) Trenton, Michigan, U.S
- Coaching career

Playing career
- 1959–1961: Michigan
- Position: End

Coaching career (HC unless noted)
- 1963: Eastern Michigan (assistant)
- 1964: Michigan Tech (assistant)
- 1966–1973: Michigan (assistant)
- 1974–1975: Eastern Michigan

Head coaching record
- Overall: 8–12–1

George W. Mans Jr. (January 31, 1940 – December 20, 2017) was an American college football player and coach and politician. He was the captain of the 1961 Michigan Wolverines football team, an assistant football coach at the University of Michigan from 1966 to 1973, and the head coach of the Eastern Michigan Eagles football (then called the Hurons) team from 1974 to 1975. Mans later went into politics, serving as the mayor of Trenton, Michigan and a member of the Michigan House of Representatives.

== Biography ==
=== Athlete ===
Mans was born in Detroit and raised in Trenton, Michigan. He attended Trenton High School where he won All-State honors in football. While in high school, Mans also won letters in basketball, tennis, track, and wrestling.

In 1958, Mans enrolled at the University of Michigan, where he played at the right end position for the Michigan Wolverines football program from 1959 to 1961. He was captain of the 1961 team that compiled a 6–3 record. Mans was 6 feet 4 inches (1.93 m), and weighed 212 pounds (96 kg) in his senior year at Michigan. After the 1961 season, Mans played for the North All-Star team in the North-South Shrine Game.

Mans graduated from Michigan in 1962 with a bachelor's degree in history. In June 1962, Mans signed with the St. Louis Cardinals of the NFL, but he did not play professionally.

=== Coach ===
In 1963, Mans began a career as a college football coach, accepting a position as the ends coach for the Eastern Michigan University football team. In July 1964, Mans was hired by the athletic director at Michigan Technological University in Houghton, Michigan to serve as the school's head wrestling coach, assistant director of intramural athletics, and assistant football coach. In 1966, he accepted an assistant coaching position at the University of Michigan where he remained for eight years from 1966 to 1973. Mans was one of two members of Bump Elliott's coaching staff to continue to serve under Bo Schembechler when he became coach in 1969. Mans later recalled that Schembechler brought a sharply different attitude to the program when he took over the reins: "He definitely brought a different philosophy to Michigan. He had that Ohio State background and said that in order to compete in the Big 10, we had to get tougher (with) practices, off-season conditioning and coaching."

In February 1974, Mans was hired as the head football coach at Eastern Michigan University, where he remained for the 1974 and 1975 seasons. In his first season as head coach, Mans' team started the season with only one win in the first six games, but the team finished strong, going 3–1–1 in the final five games. In May 1976, Mans announced his resignation as Eastern Michigan's coach in what the Associated Press described as a "surprise move." According to one newspaper report, Mans resigned "when it became apparent that EMU would place a greater emphasis on basketball, hiring former Detroit Pistons Coach Ray Scott." Mans compiled an 8–12–1 record in two seasons as the head football coach at Eastern Michigan.

=== Politics ===
After retiring from coaching, Mans entered politics in his home town of Trenton, Michigan. He was a member of the Trenton School Board of Education from 1976 to 1983 and the mayor of Trenton from 1983 to 1989. In 1996, Mans was elected to the Michigan House of Representatives as a Democrat representing the 23rd District. In 1999, Mans drew negative publicity when The Detroit News reported on its front page that Mans had the worst attendance record of any state lawmaker, having missed six of every 10 votes in the Michigan House over the past year. Mans told the News that he had been "torn" on some issues and could not decide how to cast his vote. Mans continued to serve in the Michigan House until 2002 when term limits prevented him from running for another term. He ran an unsuccessful race for a seat in the Michigan State Senate in 2002, losing to Republican Bruce Patterson by a margin of 52,444 votes to 39,338.

As of 2005, Mans was the City Administrator of Southgate, Michigan. Since at least 2006, Mans has worked in various positions in the municipal government of Flat Rock, Michigan, including positions as City Administrator, acting City Clerk and most recently economic development director.

Mans also served as the chairman of the board of directors for the Detroit River International Wildlife Refuge and has been active in efforts to develop the 400-acre (1.6 km^{2}) Humbug Marsh in Gibraltar, Michigan into a tourist destination.

== Head coaching record ==
Year	Team	Overall	Conference	Standing	Bowl/playoffs
Eastern Michigan Hurons (NCAA Division II independent) (1974–1975)
1974	Eastern Michigan	4–6–1			
1975	Eastern Michigan	4–6			
Eastern Michigan:		8–12–1			
Total:		8–12–1			
