= Riverview Community School District =

School district

Address
- 13425 Colvin Street Riverview, Wayne, Michigan, 48193; United States

District information
- Grades: Pre-Kindergarten-12
- Superintendent: Joseph "JJ" Hatzl
- Schools: 8
- Budget: $38,375,000 2022-2023 expenditures
- NCES District ID: 2629910

Students and staff
- Students: 2,752 (2024-2025)
- Teachers: 138.3 (on an FTE basis) (2024-2025)
- Staff: 248.3 FTE (2024-2025)
- Student–teacher ratio: 19.9 (2024-2025)

Other information
- Website: www.riverviewschools.com

Riverview Community School District is a public school district in the Downriver area of Metro Detroit. It serves Riverview and part of Trenton in Wayne County.

== History ==
The current Riverview Community High School was built in 1955. The architecture firm Bennett and Straight designed the building.

Albert E. Smith High School, at 12531 Longsdorf, was Riverview High School's predecessor.

Former schools in the district include Hale Elementary, at the corner of Longsdorf and Krause Streets, and Jack Downing Elementary. The Hale Elementary site is occupied by a baseball diamond next to the High School. Downing Elementary is the current location of the police department.

== Schools ==
Schools in Riverview Community Schools district
School	Address	Notes
Riverview Community High School	12431 Longsdorf, Riverview	Grades 9-12. Built 1955.
Seitz Middle School	17800 Kennebec, Riverview	Grades 6-8.
Forest Elementary	19400 Hampton, Riverview	Grades K-5.
Huntington Elementary	17752 Kennebec, Riverview	Grades K-5.
Memorial Elementary	13425 Colvin, Riverview	Grades K-5.
Riverview Virtual Academy	13249 Pennsylvania Rd., Riverview	Online school option for grades K-12.
Riverview Early Childhood Learning Center	13249 Pennsylvania, Riverview	Preschool
