= Gabriel Richard Catholic High School =

High school in Riverview, Michigan

Location
- 15325 Pennsylvania Road; Riverview, (Wayne County), Michigan 48193; United States; 42°10′59″N 83°12′34″W

Information
- Type: Private, Coeducational
- Religious affiliation: Roman Catholic
- Established: 1965
- Principal: Mr. David lopez
- Faculty: 25
- Grades: 9–12
- Enrollment: Approximately 275 (2020)
- Student to teacher ratio: 15:1
- Campus: Suburban
- Colors: Burgundy and White
- Athletics conference: Catholic High School League
- Team name: Pioneers
- Accreditation: North Central Association of Colleges and Schools
- Yearbook: Burgundy
- Athletic Director: Mrs. Jennifer Smith
- Website: https://www.gabrielrichard.org

Gabriel Richard Catholic High School, usually referred to as Gabriel Richard or simply GR, is a Catholic, coed high school in Riverview, Michigan, United States, south of Detroit. Named after Father Gabriel Richard, the school was established in 1965, with the first class graduating in 1969. It currently has approximately 300 students and approximately 25 full-time teachers, giving a student-to-teacher ratio of approximately 12:1. Located in the Roman Catholic Archdiocese of Detroit, Gabriel Richard Catholic High School has also been fully accredited by the North Central Association of Colleges and Schools since the 1993–94 school year.

== History ==
Unlike many other Catholic schools (for example Cabrini High School in nearby Allen Park, Michigan) Gabriel Richard is not tied to a specific parish. In the early 1960s, a group of parish priests from the Downriver area decided that a new Catholic high school needed to be built. The school was to be built in Wyandotte but no suitable site could be found and the school was built at its current location in Riverview. The building was completed in 1965 and the school began accepting students for the 9th grade.

=== Coed status ===
The school was designed to be a coed school. However, the original architectural plans called for the separation of the male and female students. The males would use one wing of the building (the east) and the females would use the other (the west). The cafeteria, gymnasium, band room, library, and chapel were to be shared, but used at different times by the boys and girls. However, due to scheduling problems, the school was never operated in the way it was originally planned. Evidence of the original design can still be seen in the layout of the building though. The men's restrooms are all in the east wing, while the women's restrooms are all in the west.

== Notable alumni ==
- Brooke Elliott – Television/film/stage actress and singer
- Rep. Darrin Camilleri – American politician, currently serving in the Michigan House of Representatives
- Trevor Rosen - Songwriter, Member of Old Dominion (band)

== Extracurricular activities ==
=== Clubs and groups ===
The following is a partial list of student clubs at Gabriel Richard:

- Art Club
- Band
- Drama/Theater Group
- National Honor Society
- Student Ambassadors
- Student Government
- Yearbook

=== Sports ===
Boys	Girls
Baseball	Softball
Basketball	Basketball
Bowling	Bowling
Cross Country
Football	Cheerleading
Golf	Volleyball
Hockey	Figure skating
Soccer	Soccer
Tennis	Tennis
Track & Field	Track & Field
