= Jason Morgan (politician) =

American politician (born 1989)

- Morgan in 2019

Member of the Michigan House of Representatives from the 23rd district
- Incumbent
- Assumed office January 1, 2023
- Preceded by: Darrin Camilleri

Washtenaw County Commissioner
- In office January 2017 – January 2023
- Preceded by: Yousef Rabhi
- Succeeded by: Yousef Rabhi

Personal details
- Born: Jason Thomas Morgan; July 14, 1989 (age 37) Pinconning, Michigan
- Party: Democratic
- Spouse: Jon Mallek (m. 2023)
- Education: Northern Michigan University (BA); University of Michigan (MPA)
- Website: housedems.com page

Military service
- Allegiance: United States
- Service: USCG Auxiliary

Jason Morgan is an American politician serving as a member of the Michigan House of Representatives since 2023, representing the 23rd district. A member of the Democratic Party, Morgan previously served as a Washtenaw County Commissioner representing the board's 8th district.

== Early life and education ==
Morgan was born and raised in Pinconning, Michigan. He grew up in a blue collar family, where his father worked as a commercial fisherman and his mother was a school lunch aide. He graduated from Northern Michigan University in 2011 with a bachelor's degree in Political Science. He moved to Ann Arbor in 2011. He later received a Master of Public Administration from the Ford School of Public Policy at the University of Michigan.

== Career ==
During his career in politics, Morgan has served as an advisor to Congresswoman Haley Stevens, Constituent Services Director for Michigan Secretary of State Jocelyn Benson, Transition Director for Congresswoman Elissa Slotkin, and as the District Director for Congresswoman Debbie Dingell.

In March 2021, Morgan was appointed to the Northern Michigan University Board of Trustees by Michigan Governor Gretchen Whitmer as a recess appointment for an eight-year term. Previously, Morgan's nomination was rejected by then Michigan's Republican-controlled Senate. In 2023, Morgan resigned from the Board of Trustees after he was elected to the state legislature.

Morgan is a part-time instructor at Washtenaw Community College.

Morgan is a member of the U.S. Coast Guard Auxiliary.

In February 2023, Morgan was selected to serve as the first vice chair of the Michigan Democratic Party.

=== Washtenaw County Commissioner ===
Morgan was elected to the Washtenaw County Board of Commissioners' 8th district seat in 2016. He chaired the board from 2019 to 2021 and was re-elected to the board in 2018 and 2020. Morgan served as the first openly LGBTQ chair of the commission.

=== 2022 election and first State House term ===
In June 2021, Morgan announced his candidacy for representative for Michigan's 53rd district. He received endorsements from a large number of local elected officials, including Ann Arbor Mayor Christopher Taylor and state Representative Felicia Brabec. On August 2, 2022, Morgan advanced from the Democratic primary. On November 8, 2022, Morgan was elected to serve represent the 23rd District in the Michigan House of Representatives, defeating his Republican opponent with over 65% of the vote.

In January 2023, Morgan was appointed to serve as the chair of the Appropriations Subcommittee on Military, Veterans and State Police, and as the vice chair of Appropriations Subcommittees on Education and Transportation.

In June 2023, Morgan introduced House Joint Resolution F to codify marriage equality in Michigan. Later that year, Morgan secured funding for the Ann Arbor Landfill Solar Project and a grant to support community-based public safety in his district.

In 2024, Morgan and Representative Mike McFall formed a bipartisan Public Transit Caucus in the Michigan Legislature to improve Michigan's transit infrastructure.

Morgan was reelected in 2024.

== Personal life ==
At age 13, Morgan was diagnosed with Becker's Muscular Dystrophy.

Morgan is openly gay, and in 2023 married future Ann Arbor city councilmember Jon Mallek, making both the first married same-sex couple in elected public office in Michigan.

== Electoral history ==
Michigan House of Representatives District 23, 2022
| Party | Candidate | Votes | % |
|---|---|---|---|
| Democratic | Jason Morgan | 24,256 | 65.1% |
| Republican | Richard Sharland | 13,004 | 34.9% |
| Total votes | | 37,260 | |

2024 Michigan's 23rd House of Representatives district election
| Party | Candidate | Votes | % |
|---|---|---|---|
| Democratic | Jason Morgan (incumbent) | 29,913 | 61.51% |
| Republican | David Stamp | 17,486 | 35.96% |
| Green | Christina Marudas | 1,234 | 2.54% |
| Total votes | | 48,633 | 100.0 |
