= Carlson High School =

High school in Gibraltar, Michigan, US

Location
- 30550 West Jefferson Avenue; Gibraltar, Michigan 48173; United States

Information
- Type: High school
- School district: Gibraltar School District
- Principal: Jessica Schultz
- Teaching staff: 49.98 (FTE)
- Grades: 9-12
- Enrollment: 1,104 (2023-2024)
- Student to teacher ratio: 22.09
- Colors: Royal blue and white
- Nickname: Marauders
- Website: www.gibdist.net/o/carlsonhigh

Student assessments
- 2021–22 school year Change vs. prior year

M-STEP 11th grade proficiency rates (Science / Social Studies)
- Advanced %: 8.4 / 8.0
- Proficient %: 15.9 / 21.7
- PR. Proficient %: 13.1 / 45.8
- Not Proficient %: 62.5 / 24.5

Average test scores
- SAT Total: 950.8 (▼ −15)

Oscar A. Carlson High School in Gibraltar, Michigan, United States, is located near mouth of the Detroit River at Lake Erie. It is a member of the Gibraltar School District, serving the five municipalities of Gibraltar, Flat Rock, Woodhaven, Rockwood, and Brownstown Township. It is a member of the Downriver Consortium along with nine other competitive high schools and local community colleges.

== Sports ==
The school’s athletic teams compete in the Downriver League.

The competitive cheerleading team has won MHSAA state championships in 1995, 2008, 2009, 2011, 2012, 2013, 2014, 2015, 2016, 2018, and 2019.

The Marauder football program has won seven Downriver League championships, including six consecutive titles (2018, 2021, 2022, 2023, 2024, 2025, and 2026) and three MHSAA Division 2 district championships (2023, 2024, and 2025).

The Carlson High School girls flag football program has won two league championships (2025 and 2026) and finished as the state runner-up in the 2026 Michigan Girls High School Flag Football State Championship at Ford Field. In 2026, senior captain Addy Wallace became the first female athlete in school history to commit to play collegiate flag football, signing with Eastern Michigan University's inaugural women's flag football program.

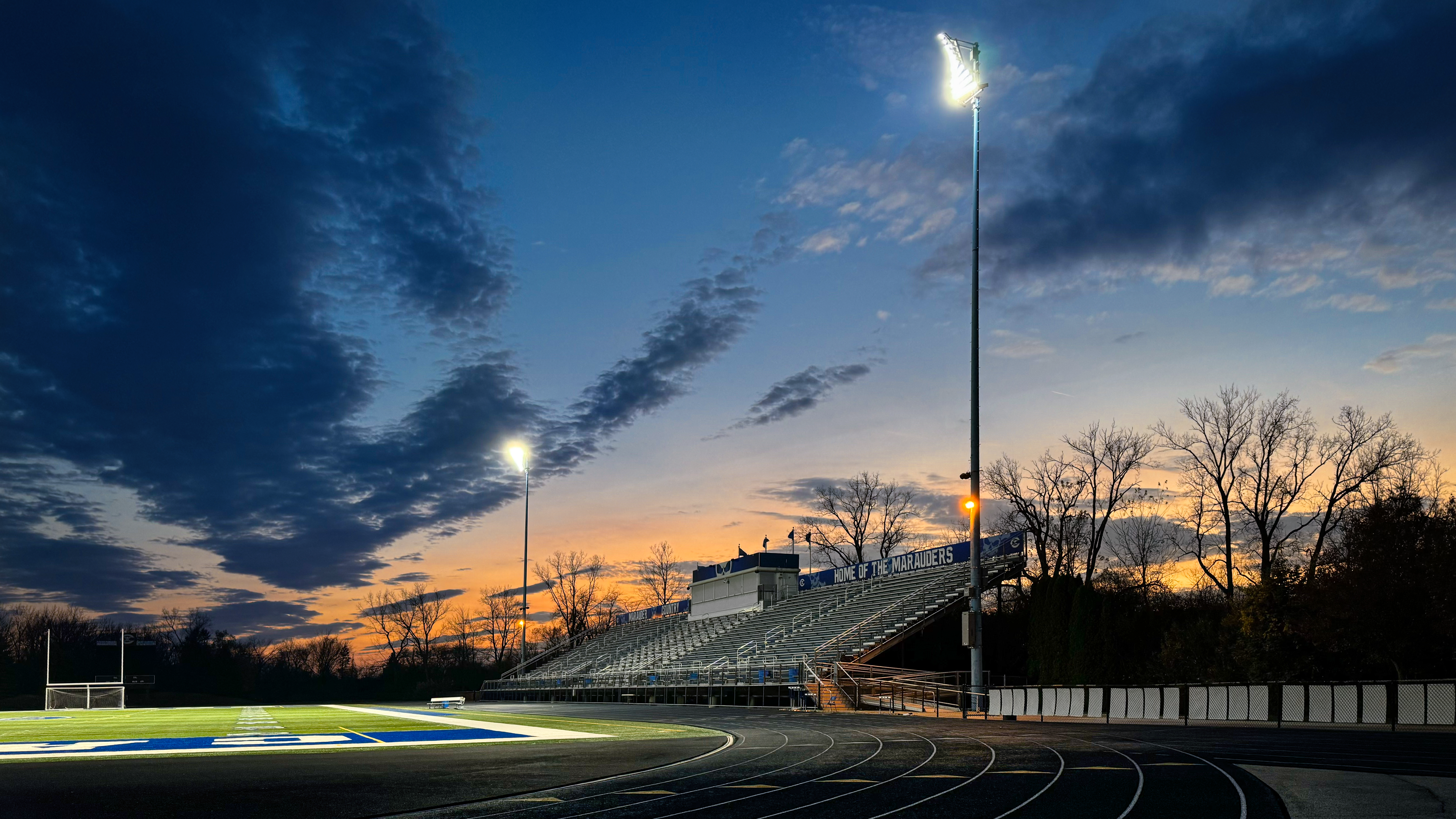
Marauder Stadium at Gibraltar Carlson High School

== Notable alumni ==
- Shelley Looney (1990) - 1998 Olympic gold medalist in ice hockey
- John Schreiber (2012) - MLB pitcher
- Kristen Woutersz (2003), Founder of American Rock Band Conquer Divide
