= Maxcine Young =

American politician (1907–2000)

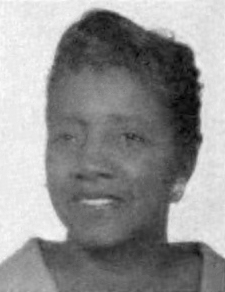
- Young c. 1965

Member of the Michigan House of Representatives
- In office 1960–1966

Personal details
- Born: June 1, 1907 Laurens, South Carolina, U.S.
- Died: March 12, 2000 (aged 92)
- Education: South Carolina State College
- Occupation: Disc jockey, real estate agent

Maxcine Young (June 1, 1907 – March 12, 2000) was an American politician.

== Biography ==
Maxcine Young was born on June 1, 1907, in Laurens, South Carolina. She attended South Carolina State College.

She entered the political arena in New York City by helping in a drive to allow Black people to drive city buses. It succeeded. In New York City, she sang in the Abyssinian Baptist Church choir, which was pastored by Adam Clayton Powell.

After moving to Michigan, she worked as a disc jockey with her own show on Detroit radio station WJLB in 1954, and also as a real estate agent, and business manager. She worked for G. Mennen Williams's first gubernatorial campaign in 1948 and helped organize Democratic groups in 13th and 16th Congressional districts.

On November 8, 1960, she was elected to the Michigan House of Representatives in a special election to fill the open seat left by the resignation of Frank D. Williams, D-Detroit. She was elected as a Representative to the 23rd District and served for 4 sessions. In 1966 she was succeeded by Jackie Vaughn III.

"Her tenure as a lawmaker included the implementation of Michigan's 1963 Constitution, and she contributed to the work of reorganizing the structure of Michigan's government. In the 1965-66 legislature, Maxcine Young became one of the first three African-American women appointed to chair standing committees of the Michigan Legislature when she headed the Public Safety Committee." She served as Chairman of the Traffic Safety Commission and helped pass the bill to add photos to driver's licenses.

Young was included in the April 1965 publication of Ebony Magazine's article "States Boast Record Number of Negro Law Makers" The article listed Maxcine Young among 18 Senators and 76 Representatives elected to serve in 24 different states.

After leaving the Michigan Legislature, Young was elected and served 8 years as a Wayne County Commissioner in Detroit. As a Commissioner, she served as a member and moderator for the Task Force on Aging/Convening Committee.

In 1975, she was among 39 founders of the National Association of Black County Officials (NABCO).

Young died on March 12, 2000.
