= Riverview Community High School =

High school in Riverview, Wayne County, Michigan

Location
- 12431 Longsdorf Street; Riverview, Michigan; United States
- 42°10′36″N 83°10′39″W

Information
- Type: Public
- School district: Riverview Community School District
- Teaching staff: 40.95 (on an FTE basis)
- Grades: 9–12
- Enrollment: 893 (2023-2024)
- Student to teacher ratio: 21.81
- Campus: Suburban
- Colors: Maroon and gold
- Nickname: Pirates
- Website: rchs.riverviewschools.com

Student assessments
- 2021–22 school year Change vs. prior year

M-STEP 11th grade proficiency rates (Science / Social Studies)
- Advanced %: 16.5 / 12.4
- Proficient %: 23.4 / 25.3
- PR. Proficient %: 16.5 / 45.7
- Not Proficient %: 43.6 / 16.7

Average test scores
- SAT Total: 1000.2 (▲ +11.9)

Riverview Community High School (RCHS) is a public high school in Riverview, Michigan, United States. It is a current member of the Huron League. The school is a part of the Riverview Community School District. Contrary to popular belief, the school's mascot is the a Buccaneer, not a Pirate.

== Notable alumni ==
- Lloyd Carr - former University of Michigan head football coach
- Bob Guiney - known for his role on The Bachelor
- Bill McCartney - former University of Colorado head football coach
- Robert Teet - Wrestler, member of the U.S. Wrestling team
- Woody Widenhofer - former Pittsburgh Steelers assistant football coach and former collegiate head coach
