= Michael H. Conlin =

American politician (1943–2020)

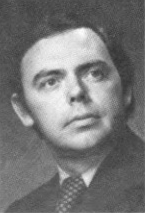

Member of the Michigan House of Representatives from the 23rd district
- In office January 1, 1975 – 1978
- Preceded by: Hal Ziegler
- Succeeded by: Mary Keith Ballantine

Personal details
- Born: July 11, 1943 Detroit, Michigan
- Died: October 7, 2020 (aged 77)
- Party: Republican

Michael Henry Thomas Conlin (July 11, 1943 – November 2020) was a former member of the Michigan House of Representatives.

== Early life ==
Conlin was born in Detroit on July 11, 1943.

== Career ==
On November 5, 1974, Conlin was elected to the Michigan House of Representatives where he represented the 23rd district from January 8, 1975 to 1978. Conlin unsuccessfully ran for the United States House of Representatives seat representing Michigan's 6th district in 1978.

== Personal life ==
Conlin was a member of the Disabled American Veterans. Conlin was Catholic.

== Death ==
Conlin died in November 2020.
