= Jackie Vaughn III =

American politician (1917–2006)

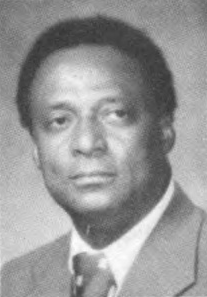

Member of the Michigan Senate
- In office September 20, 1978 – December 31, 2002
- Preceded by: Arthur Cartwright
- Succeeded by: Samuel "Buzz" Thomas
- Constituency: 5th district (1978–1982); 3rd district (1983–1994); 4th district (1995–2002)

Member of the Michigan House of Representatives
- In office January 1, 1967 – 1978
- Preceded by: Maxcine Young
- Succeeded by: Carolyn Cheeks Kilpatrick
- Constituency: 23rd district (1967–1972); 18th district (1973–1978)

Personal details
- Born: November 17, 1917 Birmingham, Alabama, U.S.
- Died: September 13, 2006 (aged 88) Detroit, Michigan, U.S.
- Resting place: Woodlawn Cemetery, Detroit
- Party: Democratic
- Education: Oxford University (Litt. B.); Oberlin College (MA); Hillsdale College (BA)

Military service
- Allegiance: United States
- Branch/service: United States Navy
- Rank: Yeoman

Jackie Vaughn III (November 17, 1917 – September 13, 2006) was a Democratic member of both houses of the Michigan Legislature for over three decades.

Born in Birmingham, Alabama, in 1917, Vaughn moved to Detroit in 1944. He studied at Oberlin and Hillsdale colleges before being a Fulbright Scholar and fellow at Oxford University. Vaughn was elected to the Michigan House of Representatives in 1966 and served six terms before his election to the Michigan Senate. He was elected to the state Senate in a special election after the resignation of Senator Arthur Cartwright. He was sworn in September 20, 1978.

One hallmark of his tenure was the establishment of a holiday in Michigan to honor Martin Luther King Jr. He was also known for his devotion to the Hartford Memorial Baptist Church. He was also elected president pro tempore of the Senate in 1983, becoming the first African-American to hold the position, and was later named associate president pro tempore.

Vaughn suffered a stroke in 2000 after checking himself into the hospital in Lansing and was excused from Senate session for the remaining two years of his term. When he left the Senate in 2002, the Senate recognized him as having "'fought the good fight' on behalf of the people of Detroit," and that his "consistent efforts on behalf of young people, his tireless leadership in promoting the work of Dr. Martin Luther King, and his advocacy of programs to help the needy have earned him widespread respect."

Vaughn was a member of Omicron Delta Kappa, the Elks, and a Freemason. He died on September 13, 2006, aged 88.
