= Riverview, Michigan =

- City
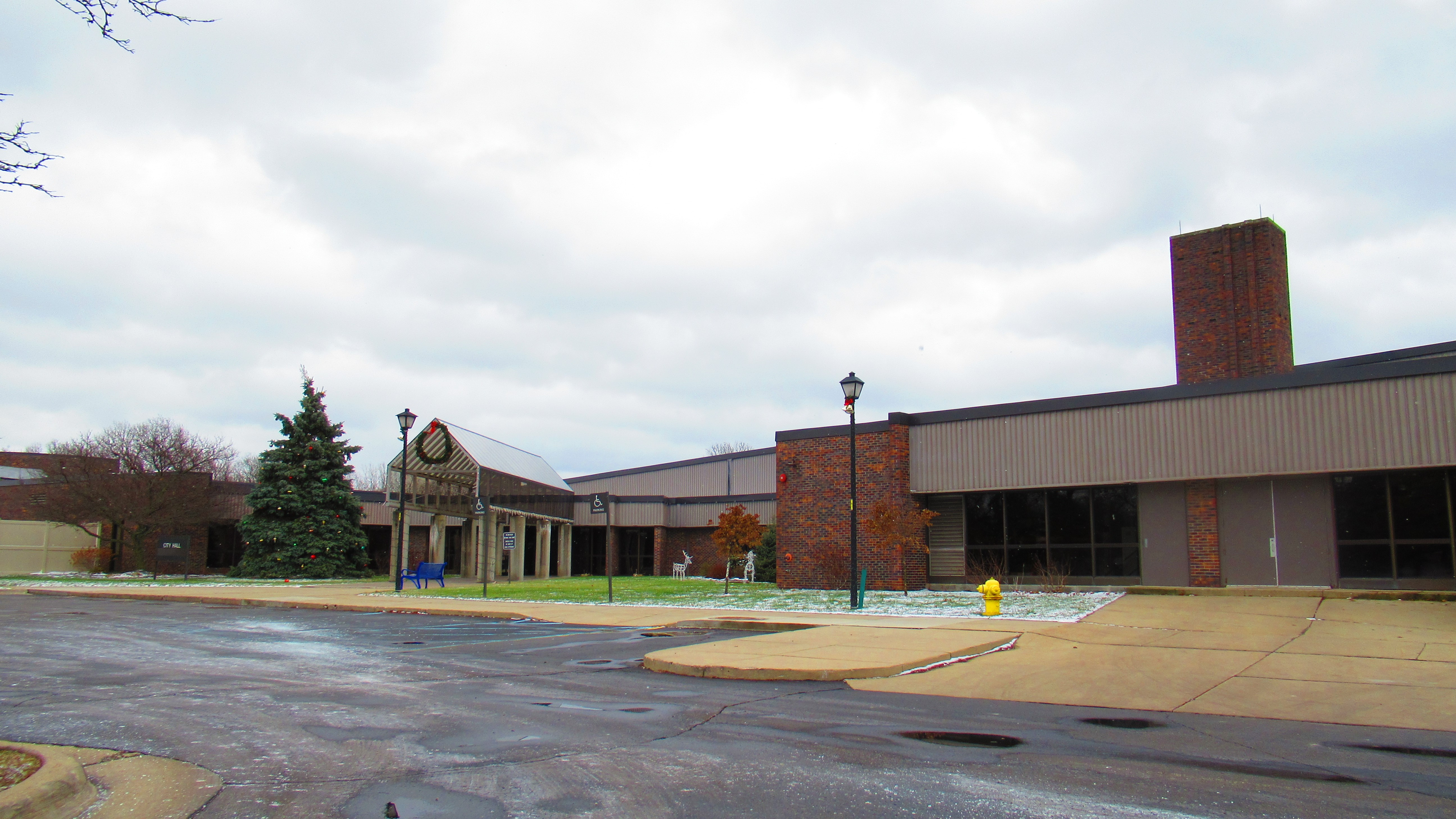
- Riverview City Hall

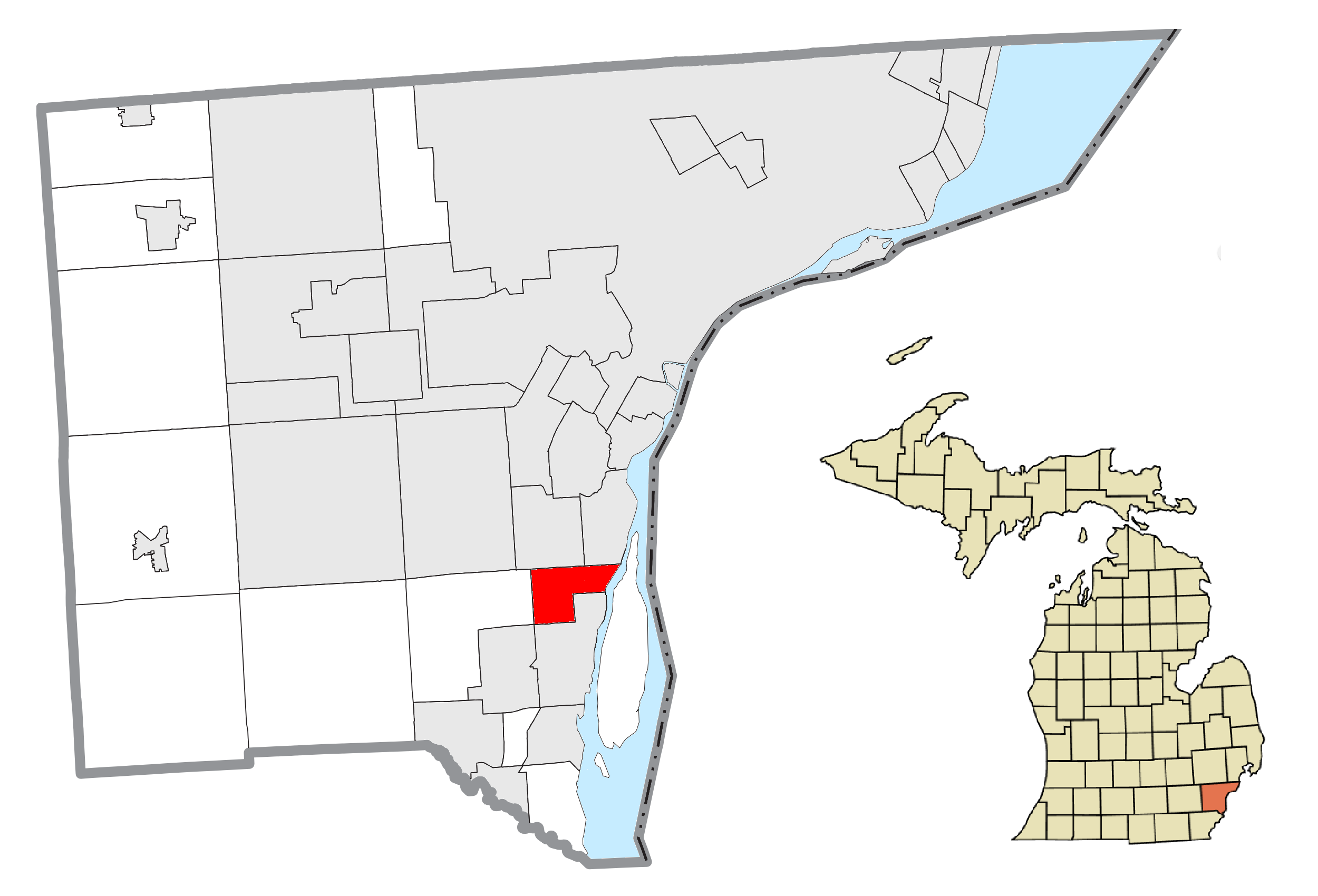
- Location within Wayne County

- Location within the state of Michigan Location within the United States
- Coordinates: 42°10′30″N 83°11′18″W
- Country: United States
- State: Michigan
- County: Wayne
- Incorporated: 1923 (village); 1959 (city)

Government
  - Type: Mayor–council
  - Mayor: Andrew Swift
  - Mayor pro tem: Lynn Blanchette

Area
  - City: 4.67 sq mi (12.09 km^{2})
  - Land: 4.58 sq mi (11.85 km^{2})
  - Water: 0.093 sq mi (0.24 km^{2})
- Elevation: 600 ft (183 m)

Population (2020)
  - City: 12,490
  - Density: 2,730.8/sq mi (1,054.35/km^{2})
  - Metro: 4,285,832 (Metro Detroit)
- Time zone: UTC-5 (EST)
  - Summer (DST): UTC-4 (EDT)
- ZIP code(s): 48192 (Wyandotte); 48193
- Area code: 734
- FIPS code: 26-68880
- GNIS feature ID: 0636018
- Website: cityofriverview.com

Riverview is a city in Wayne County in the U.S. state of Michigan. A Downriver suburb of Detroit, Riverview is located roughly 14 miles (22.5 km) southwest of downtown Detroit. As of the 2020 census, Riverview had a population of 12,490.

Riverview was incorporated as a village within Monguagon Township in 1923 and later incorporated as a city in 1959.

== History ==
The August 9, 1812 Battle of Monguagon between Americans and a British-Indian coalition took place in today's Riverview. Native Americans were led by the famous Shawnee warrior Tecumseh, who was wounded in the engagement. The Americans gained a tactical victory at Monguagon but suffered a strategic defeat when US forces returned to Detroit after the fight without reopening their supply line to Ohio. Much of the location remains undeveloped in a green area bounded by Pennsylvania Road to the north, Colvin Street to the south, Electric Avenue to the east, and Vreeland Park to the west, which is also part of the battlefield.

In 1950, Riverview only stretched as far west as the western end of Trenton's two northern boundaries. The rest of what is today Riverview was still part of the unincorporated Monguagon Township at that point. In the 1950s and 1960s, during the Cold War, the Department of Defense (through the United States Army) operated Nike missile launch site D-54 on the site of what is now Young Patriot's Park. The IFC (integrated fire control) site was on the site of what is now Rivergate Nursing Home and Terrace.

== Geography ==
According to the United States Census Bureau, the city has a total area of 4.48 square miles (11.60 km^{2}), of which 4.39 square miles (11.37 km^{2}) is land and 0.09 square miles (0.23 km^{2}) is water.

== Demographics ==
Historical population
| Census | Pop. | Note | %± |
|---|---|---|---|
| 1930 | 743 | | — |
| 1940 | 804 | | 8.2% |
| 1950 | 1,432 | | 78.1% |
| 1960 | 7,237 | | 405.4% |
| 1970 | 11,342 | | 56.7% |
| 1980 | 14,569 | | 28.5% |
| 1990 | 13,894 | | −4.6% |
| 2000 | 13,272 | | −4.5% |
| 2010 | 12,486 | | −5.9% |
| 2020 | 12,490 | | 0.0% |
U.S. Decennial Census

=== Racial and ethnic composition ===
Riverview city, Michigan – Racial and ethnic composition Note: the US Census treats Hispanic/Latino as an ethnic category. This table excludes Latinos from the racial categories and assigns them to a separate category. Hispanics/Latinos may be of any race.
| Race / Ethnicity (NH = Non-Hispanic) | Pop 2000 | Pop 2010 | Pop 2020 | % 2000 | % 2010 | % 2020 |
|---|---|---|---|---|---|---|
| White alone (NH) | 12,227 | 11,233 | 10,333 | 92.13% | 89.96% | 82.73% |
| Black or African American alone (NH) | 275 | 380 | 649 | 2.07% | 3.04% | 5.20% |
| Native American or Alaska Native alone (NH) | 53 | 48 | 44 | 0.40% | 0.38% | 0.35% |
| Asian alone (NH) | 248 | 192 | 193 | 1.87% | 1.54% | 1.55% |
| Native Hawaiian or Pacific Islander alone (NH) | 2 | 5 | 1 | 0.02% | 0.04% | 0.01% |
| Other race alone (NH) | 13 | 4 | 43 | 0.10% | 0.03% | 0.34% |
| Mixed race or Multiracial (NH) | 127 | 112 | 548 | 0.96% | 0.90% | 4.39% |
| Hispanic or Latino (any race) | 327 | 512 | 679 | 2.46% | 4.10% | 5.44% |
| Total | 13,272 | 12,486 | 12,490 | 100.00% | 100.00% | 100.00% |

=== 2020 census ===
As of the 2020 census, Riverview had a population of 12,490. The median age was 46.2 years. 18.5% of residents were under the age of 18 and 25.5% of residents were 65 years of age or older. For every 100 females there were 85.1 males, and for every 100 females age 18 and over there were 83.2 males age 18 and over.

100.0% of residents lived in urban areas, while 0.0% lived in rural areas.

There were 5,313 households in Riverview, of which 25.4% had children under the age of 18 living in them. Of all households, 42.6% were married-couple households, 17.4% were households with a male householder and no spouse or partner present, and 34.3% were households with a female householder and no spouse or partner present. About 34.4% of all households were made up of individuals and 19.6% had someone living alone who was 65 years of age or older.

There were 5,589 housing units, of which 4.9% were vacant. The homeowner vacancy rate was 1.0% and the rental vacancy rate was 7.2%.

Racial composition as of the 2020 census
| Race | Number | Percent |
|---|---|---|
| White | 10,584 | 84.7% |
| Black or African American | 662 | 5.3% |
| American Indian and Alaska Native | 54 | 0.4% |
| Asian | 194 | 1.6% |
| Native Hawaiian and Other Pacific Islander | 1 | 0.0% |
| Some other race | 156 | 1.2% |
| Two or more races | 839 | 6.7% |

=== 2010 census ===
As of the census of 2010, there were 12,486 people, 5,163 households, and 3,307 families living in the city. The population density was 2,844.2 inhabitants per square mile (1,098.2/km^{2}). There were 5,520 housing units at an average density of 1,257.4 per square mile (485.5/km^{2}). The racial makeup of the city was 93.0% White, 3.1% African American, 0.4% Native American, 1.6% Asian, 0.5% from other races, and 1.3% from two or more races. Hispanic or Latino of any race were 4.1% of the population.

There were 5,163 households, of which 27.3% had children under the age of 18 living with them, 46.4% were married couples living together, 13.1% had a female householder with no husband present, 4.5% had a male householder with no wife present, and 35.9% were non-families. 31.6% of all households were made up of individuals, and 17.2% had someone living alone who was 65 years of age or older. The average household size was 2.31 and the average family size was 2.90.

The median age in the city was 45.4 years. 19.6% of residents were under the age of 18; 8.6% were between the ages of 18 and 24; 21.3% were from 25 to 44; 27.9% were from 45 to 64; and 22.6% were 65 years of age or older. The gender makeup of the city was 46.4% male and 53.6% female.

=== 2000 census ===
As of the census of 2000, there were 13,272 people, 5,352 households, and 3,569 families living in the city. The population density was 3,012.6 inhabitants per square mile (1,163.2/km^{2}). There were 5,532 housing units at an average density of 1,255.7 per square mile (484.8/km^{2}). The racial makeup of the city was 94.13% White, 2.11% African American, 0.43% Native American, 1.88% Asian, 0.02% Pacific Islander, 0.32% from other races, and 1.12% from two or more races. Hispanic or Latino of any race were 2.46% of the population.

Of the 5,352 households, 27.9% had children under the age of 18 living with them, 53.1% were married couples living together, 10.8% had a female householder with no husband present, and 33.3% were non-families. 29.1% of all households were made up of individuals, and 15.0% had someone living alone who was 65 years of age or older. The average household size was 2.38 and the average family size was 2.95.

The city's population was spread out, with 21.3% under the age of 18, 8.2% aged 18 to 24, 25.7% aged 25 to 44, 25.0% aged 45 to 64, and 19.7% who were 65 years of age or older. The median age was 42 years. For every 100 females, there were 87.3 males. For every 100 females age 18 and over, there were 82.5 males.

The median income for a household in the city was $47,623, and the median income for a family was $61,007. Males had a median income of $51,944 versus $31,295 for females. The per capita income for the city was $25,460. About 3.0% of families and 4.7% of the population were below the poverty line, including 3.4% of those under age 18 and 5.2% of those age 65 or over.

== Education ==
=== Public schools ===
The Riverview Community School District operates five public schools. There are six schools located in Riverview:

- Riverview Community High School
- Seitz Middle School
- Forest Elementary School
- Huntington Elementary School
- Memorial Elementary School

=== Catholic schools ===
There is also a private Catholic high school named Gabriel Richard Catholic High School, located at Pennsylvania and McCann Street.

== Transportation ==
=== Major roadways ===
- I-75 runs south–north about one mile (1.6 km) west of the city limits of Riverview and is accessible via exits 34A Dix–Toledo Road and 34B Sibley Road.
- M-85, known locally as Fort Street, runs south–north through the center of Riverview.
- West Jefferson Avenue runs south–north along the easternmost edge of Riverview along the Detroit River.

=== Bridges ===
- The Wayne County Bridge is a toll bridge that connects West Jefferson Avenue via Bridge Road to the island of Grosse Ile.

== Notable people ==
- Lloyd Carr, former University of Michigan head football coach
- Bob Guiney, The Bachelor contestant
- Bill McCartney, former University of Colorado head football coach, founder of Promise Keepers
- Derek St. Holmes, vocalist for Ted Nugent
- Woody Widenhofer (1943–2020), former Pittsburgh Steelers assistant football coach and former collegiate head coach

== Images ==
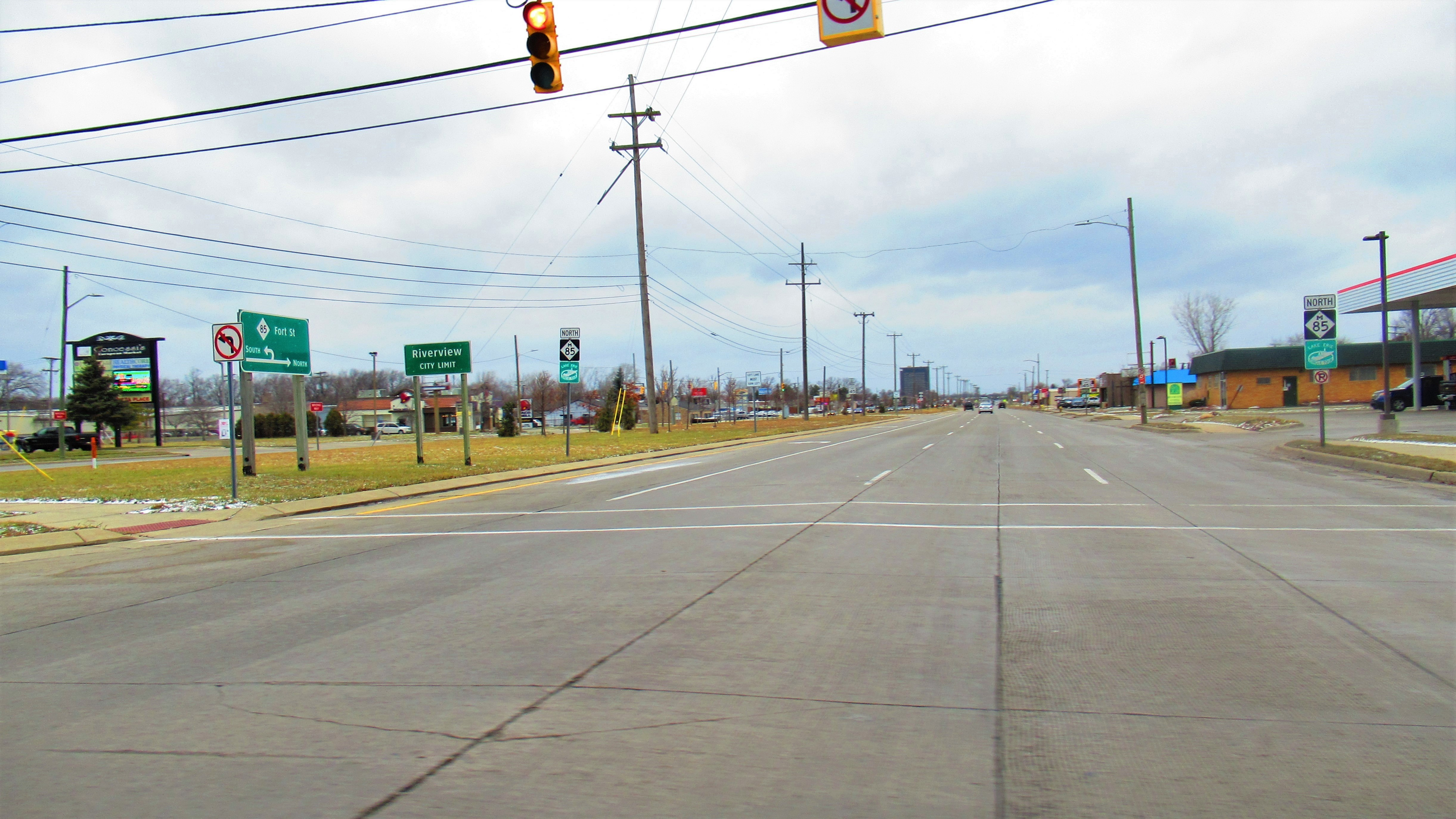
Looking north along Fort Street

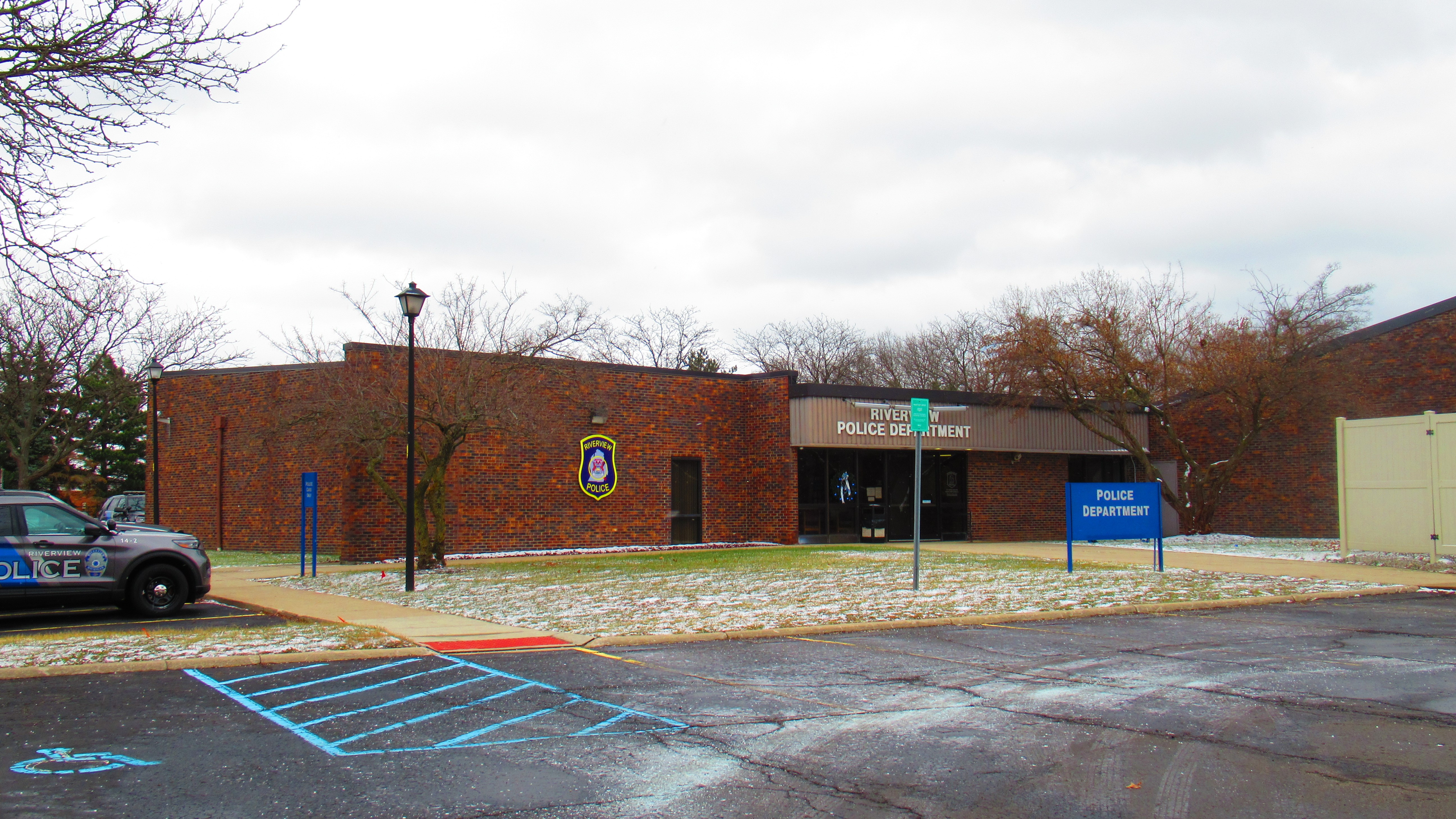
Riverview Police Department

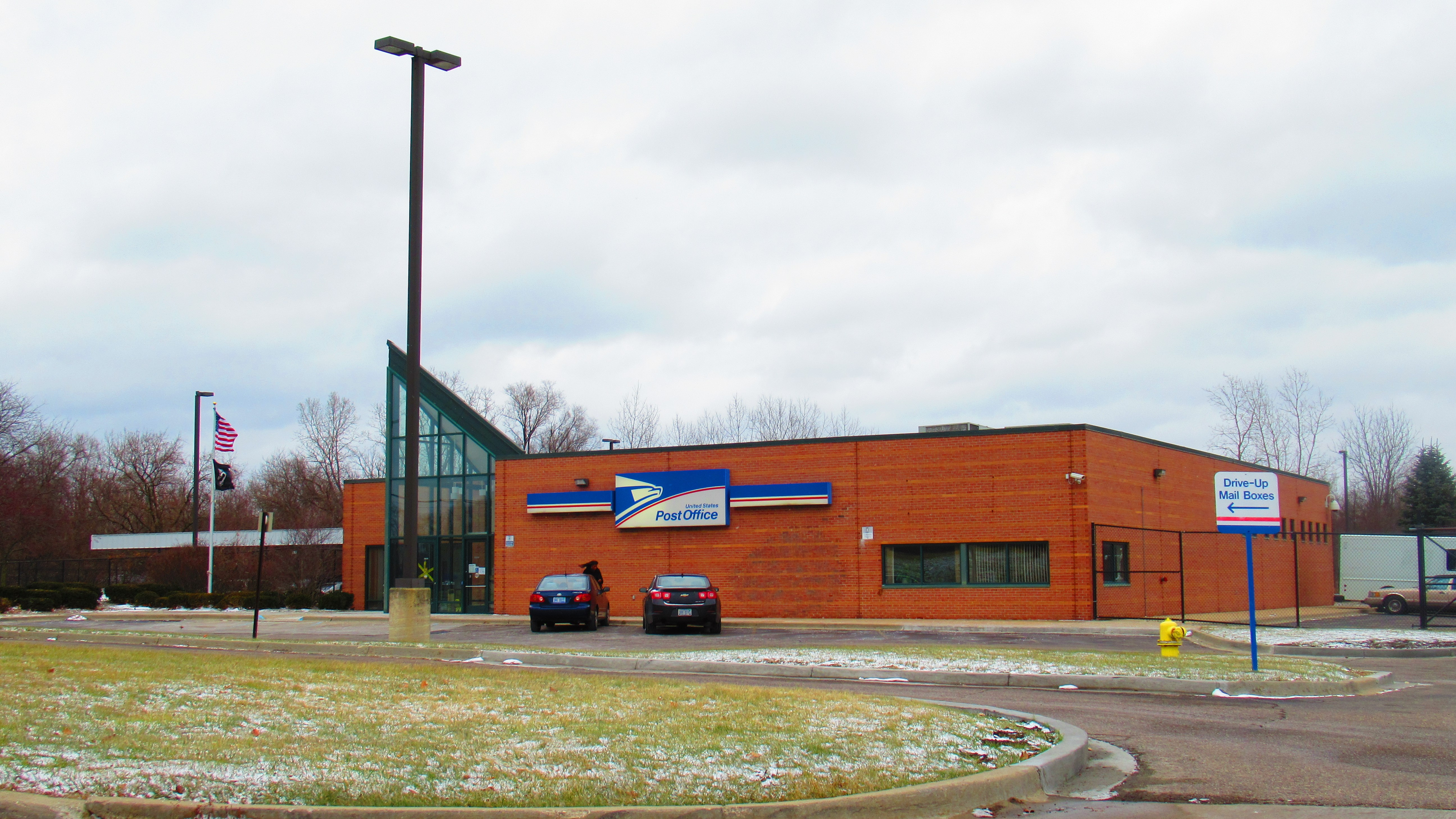
U.S. post office in Riverview

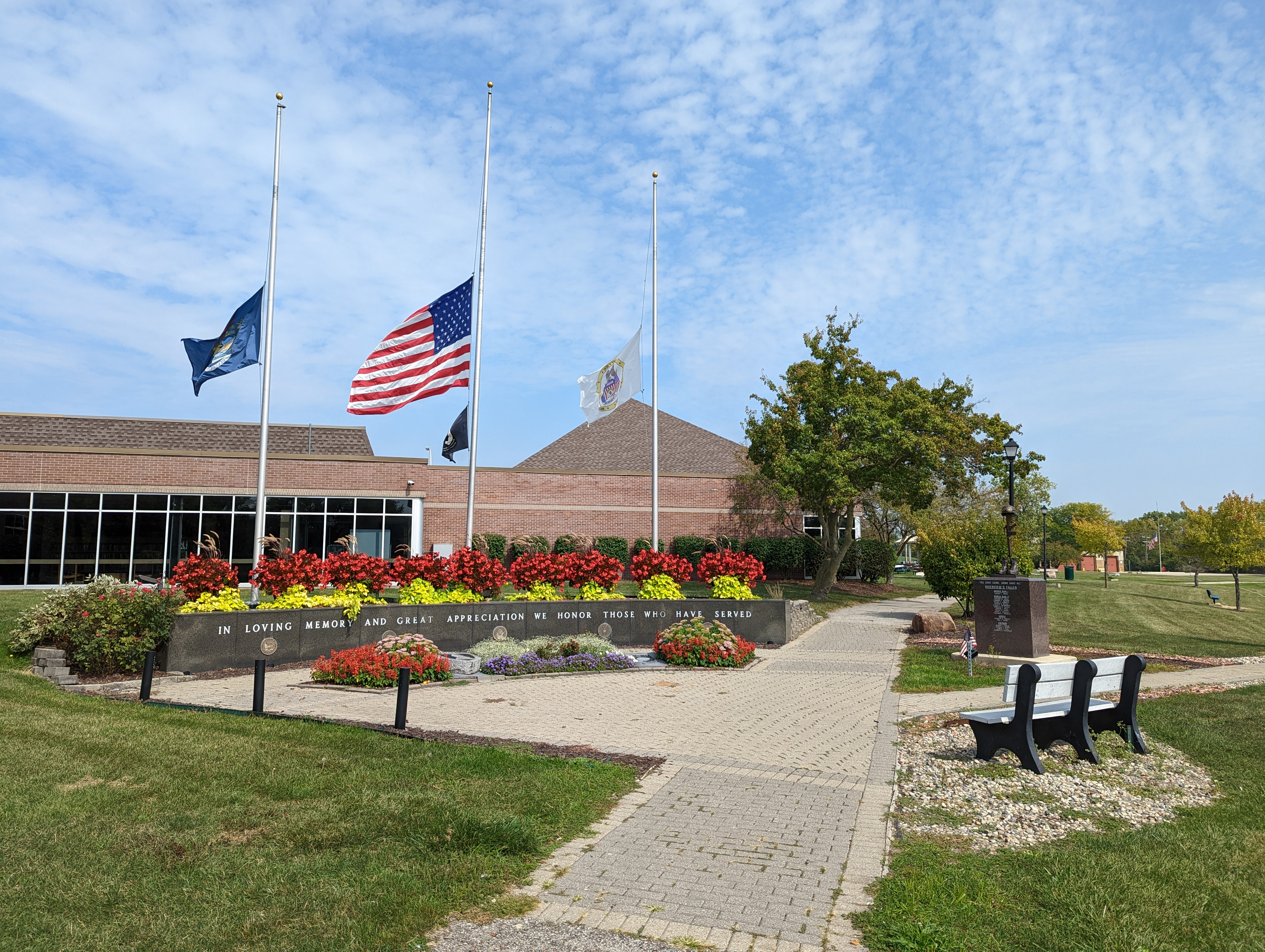
Riverview Veterans Memorial Library
