= Robert Teet =

American professional wrestler

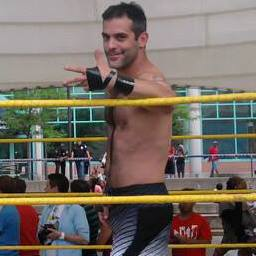
- Teet in June 2013

Personal information
- Born: March 27, 1979 (age 47)

Professional wrestling career
- Ring name(s): Rob Clooney; Rob Teet; Rick Solid
- Billed height: 5 ft 10 in (178 cm)
- Billed weight: 202 lb (92 kg)
- Billed from: Detroit, Michigan
- Trained by: NWA Great Lakes
- Debut: 2001

Robert Teet (born March 27, 1979) is an American professional wrestler, amateur wrestler, and author. He currently competes on the independent wrestling circuit in the Great Lakes region as Rob Clooney. Teet is best known for his accomplishments in beach wrestling, where he has earned All American honors four times, an alternate for the United States wrestling team twice, and earned All World honors as a member of the U.S. wrestling team at the 2011 World Beach Wrestling Championships. Teet is also an All American in belt wrestling.

== Early life ==
Teet was a fan of professional wrestling in the late 1980s, and expressed interest in participating in amateur wrestling. Growing up in River Rouge, Michigan, there weren't amateur wrestling clubs available. He finally had the chance to compete after his family moved to Brown City, Michigan during his first year in high school. Teet won the team's "Rookie of the Year" award, was a part of the school's first team district championship during his sophomore season, and qualified for the Michigan High School Athletic Association (MHSAA) individual state championships his junior year. By the end of his junior season, Teet became the first wrestler from Brown City to have more than thirty wins in a season and held the school record for pins in a season. Before the start of his senior year, Teet enrolled in Riverview Community High School. MHSAA rules prohibited Teet from competition during the first semester, which resulted in Teet not getting enough matches to qualify for the post-season. He did not wrestle in college.

== Professional wrestling ==
Teet began his pro wrestling training with the National Wrestling Alliance-Great Lakes in 2000, making his debut in 2001 as Rick Solid. He often teamed up with real-life best friend, Raymond Gold, as the team Solid Gold. The duo won a pair of tag-team championships before Teet embarked a singles career. During his tenure as Rick Solid, Teet won the Underground Wrestling Alliance's Heavyweight and I–C Championship, the Livonia Entertainment Wrestling Championship, the Xtreme Boarder Wrestling Championship, and the Blue Water Championship Wrestling Cruiserweight Championship. He won the BWCW Tag-Team Championship with Buddy Hanlon, and won the 2002 King of the North tournament. He also wrestled for Thunderzone Wrestling, Superior Wrestling Alliance, Independent Wrestling Revolution, Urban Wrestling Alliance, and Universal Wrestling Alliance. Other career highlights include a successful BWCW Cruiserweight title defense against Shark Boy and an unsuccessful attempt at winning the X Division Championship in a match featuring then-X Division Champion Chris Sabin, Truth Martini and Buddy Hanlon.

Teet took time away from professional wrestling in late 2003, to mourn the death of Raymond Gold. He returned to the ring in the spring of 2005, eventually changing his name to Rob Clooney and teaming up with Deuce Diamond as the Motor City High Rollers.

== Return to amateur wrestling ==
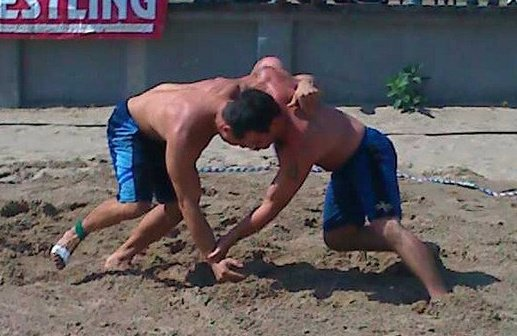
Anthony Gallton (left) vs Teet (right) at the 2010 USA World Team Trials

Teet left professional wrestling early in 2007 to compete in amateur wrestling. He competed weekly in local Amateur Athletic Union tournaments, winning the AAU-Michigan State Championship in folkstyle wrestling. He competed at the 2007 USA Wrestling Beach Wrestling National Championships in Rochester, New York, where he became an All American after placing third in the 150-pound weight class. The top three finish qualified him for the World Team Trials in the Lightweight division (187 pounds and lower), where he placed fourth to become an alternate for the 2007 U.S. Wrestling Team. During the Trials, he pinned 187-pound National Champion, Neil Cook, to earn a spot in the bronze medal match.

Teet again won the AAU-Michigan State Championship in folkstyle in 2008, along with the Florida Ironman Championships. He finished in second place at the Beach Wrestling National Championships, but failed to win a match during the World Team Trials. In 2009, Teet suffered an injury that kept him out for the year.

He made a comeback in 2010 and placed second at the Beach Wrestling National Championships, and finished in 4th place at the World Team Trials to be named an alternate for the U.S. Team for the second time in his career. United World Wrestling (then known as FILA) expanded the number of weight classes for Men from two to four in 2011. The United States selected their members for the 2011 Beach Wrestling U.S. Team, in which Teet was selected to represent the 154-pound (70 kg) weight class. During the World Championships, held in Batumi, Georgia, Teet wrestled American teammate Donovan DePatto for the silver medal. Teet lost the match, finishing 4th place in the competition to earn All World honors. The match between Teet and DePatto marked them as the first two athletes from the western hemisphere to compete for a medal other than bronze at the Beach Wrestling World Championships.

Teet has been involved in beach wrestling as an athlete, referee, coach, and tournament director. Teet retired from amateur wrestling in 2013, but has on occasion entered beach wrestling competitions. He won the Michigan USA Wrestling State Championship in 2015 and 2017, and earned All American honors in beach wrestling and belt wrestling in 2018.

== Return to professional wrestling ==
Teet returned to the ring in 2013, and reformed the Motor City High Roller team with Deuce Diamond, until Deuce retired in early 2016. He has competed for Blue Water Championship Wrestling, Pro Wrestling All Stars, Pure Pro Wrestling, Midwest Professional Wrestling Alliance, Juggalo Championship Wrestling, and Takedown Wrestling Alliance. He reached the finals of the Raymond Gold 10 Year Memorial Tournament, losing to Breyer Wellington. He has teamed up with "The Maize Rage" Rampage in 2016, and the team known as All American Aggression won the TWA Tag-Team Championship near the end of the year and held the titles for a 910-day reign. He also started teaming with "Mr. Fitness" Slim Trimmons as Twinkie Power during the autumn of 2017., winning the BWCW Tag-Team of the Year award in 2018. Teet has also served as "Commissioner" in MPWA. He currently has a reoccurring role on MPWA's Collision X television show, which is broadcast on MISE TV.

== Author ==
Teet has written four editions of Hosting Beach Wrestling Events and was a main contributor to the now defunct website, SandWrestling.com. Teet (as Rob Clooney) published a memoir titled Corporate Lunacy; Behind the Scenes of America's Worst Gas Station (and a follow-up Revised Edition). Teet (as Rob Clooney) made his fictional debut with Fast Cash in the summer of 2019.

== Championships and accomplishments ==
=== Amateur wrestling ===
- Michigan High School Athletic Association
  - 1995 Team District Champion (with the Brown City Green Devils)
  - 1996 Individual State Championships qualifier
- Amateur Athletic Union
  - 2x AAU-Michigan Folkstyle State Champion (2007, 2008)
- USA Wrestling
  - 5x All American
    - 2007 Beach Wrestling National Championships, 3rd place (150 pounds)
    - 2008 Beach Wrestling National Championships, 2nd place (158 pounds)
    - 2010 Beach Wrestling National Championships, 2nd place (170 pounds)
    - 2018 Beach Wrestling National Championships, 3rd place (Veteran B, open weight)
    - 2018 Belt Wrestling National Championships, 3rd place (85 kg)
  - 2x U.S. Team alternate
    - 2007 Beach Wrestling World Team Trials, 4th place (Lightweight, 187-pound division)
    - 2010 Beach Wrestling World Team Trials, 4th place (Lightweight, 187-pound division)
  - U.S. Team member (2011)
  - Florida Ironman Champion (2008)
  - 2x Michigan Beach Wrestling State Champion (2015, 2017)
- United World Wrestling
  - 2011 World Beach Wrestling Championships, 4th place (154 pounds, 70 kg)

=== Professional wrestling ===
- Blue Water Championship Wrestling
  - BWCW Cruiserweight Champion
  - BWCW Tag-Team Champion (with Buddy Hanlon)
  - 2003 Raymond Gold Memorial tournament winner
  - 2018 Tag-Team of the Year (as Twinkie Power, with "Mr. Fitness" Slim Trimmons)
- Hardcore World of Wrestling
  - HWOW Tag-Team Champion (with Raymond Gold)
- Livonia Entertainment Wrestling
  - LEW Champion
- Smart Mark Radio
  - SMR 2010 Interview of the Year
- Superior Wrestling Alliance
  - 2x SWA Tag-Team Champion (1x with Raymond Gold; 1x with Devin Devine)
  - 2002 King of the North tournament champion
- Takedown Wrestling Alliance
  - TWA Tag-Team Champion (with Rampage)
- Underground Wrestling Alliance
  - UWA Heavyweight Champion
  - UWA I–C Champion
- Xtreme Border Wrestling
  - XBW Champion

=== Literary works ===
- Corporate Lunacy; Behind the Scenes of America's Worst Gas Station ISBN 9780359125227; Revised Edition ISBN 9780359686247
- Fast Cash ISBN 9780359879311
- Hosting Beach Wrestling Events ISBN 9781300436928 (1st edition); ISBN 9781304023100 (2nd edition); ISBN 9781329548480 (3rd edition); ISBN 978-1387969975 (3.5 edition)
- A Solid Performance (working project)
