= Woodhaven, Michigan =

- City
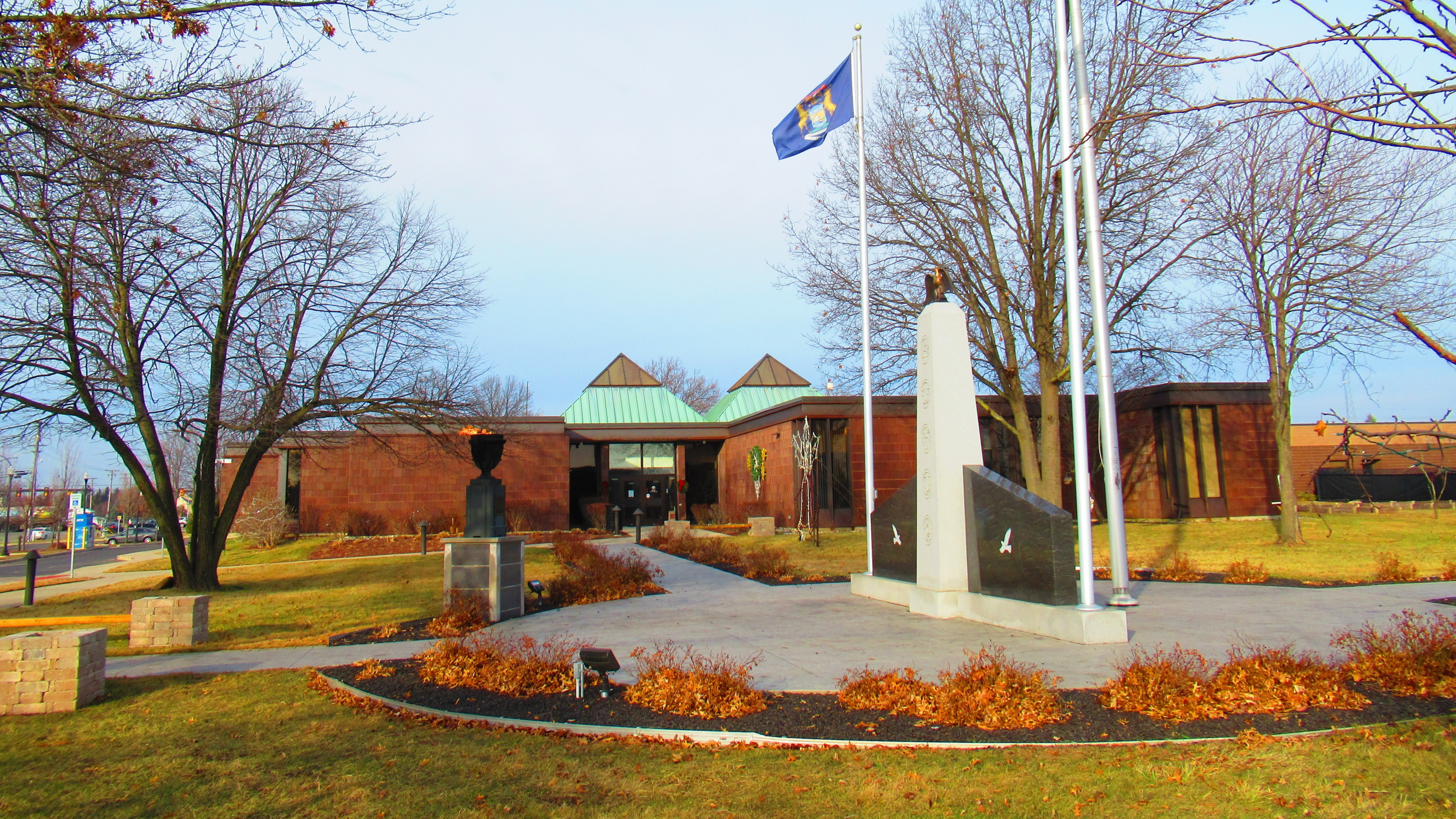
- Woodhaven City Hall on Hall Road

- Location within Wayne County

- Location within the state of Michigan Location within the United States
- Coordinates: 42°07′57″N 83°14′12″W
- Country: United States
- State: Michigan
- County: Wayne
- Incorporated: 1965

Government
  - Type: Mayor–council
  - Mayor: Patricia Odette
  - Administrator: Jeff Harris
  - Clerk: Angie Shurkus

Area
  - City: 6.44 sq mi (16.69 km^{2})
  - Land: 6.39 sq mi (16.55 km^{2})
  - Water: 0.058 sq mi (0.15 km^{2})
- Elevation: 604 ft (184 m)

Population (2020)
  - City: 12,941
  - Density: 2,025.7/sq mi (782.12/km^{2})
  - Metro: 4,285,832 (Metro Detroit)
- Time zone: UTC-5 (EST)
  - Summer (DST): UTC-4 (EDT)
- ZIP code(s): 48134 (Flat Rock); 48183 (Trenton)
- Area code: 734
- FIPS code: 26-88380
- GNIS feature ID: 1616746
- Website: Official website

Woodhaven is a city in Wayne County in the U.S. state of Michigan. A Downriver suburb of Detroit, Woodhaven is located roughly 18 miles (29.0 km) southwest of downtown Detroit. As of the 2020 census, the city had a population of 12,941.

== Geography ==
According to the United States Census Bureau, the city has a total area of 6.45 square miles (16.71 km^{2}), of which 6.39 square miles (16.55 km^{2}) is land and 0.06 square miles (0.16 km^{2}) is water.

Woodhaven has two ZIP Codes. One (48183) covers the majority of the city, as well as Trenton and portions of Brownstown Township. The other ZIP Code (48134) includes a small portion of the southwest corner of Woodhaven and is shared with Flat Rock.

== Demographics ==
Historical population
Census	Pop.	Note	%±
1970	3,566		—
1980	10,902		205.7%
1990	11,631		6.7%
2000	12,530		7.7%
2010	12,875		2.8%
2020	12,941		0.5%
U.S. Decennial Census

=== Racial and ethnic composition ===
Woodhaven city, Michigan – Racial and ethnic composition Note: the US Census treats Hispanic/Latino as an ethnic category. This table excludes Latinos from the racial categories and assigns them to a separate category. Hispanics/Latinos may be of any race.
Race / Ethnicity (NH = Non-Hispanic)	Pop 2000	Pop 2010	Pop 2020	% 2000	% 2010	% 2020
White alone (NH)	11,381	10,967	10,013	90.83%	85.18%	77.37%
Black or African American alone (NH)	292	673	991	2.33%	5.23%	7.66%
Native American or Alaska Native alone (NH)	57	31	33	0.45%	0.24%	0.26%
Asian alone (NH)	201	297	314	1.60%	2.31%	2.43%
Native Hawaiian or Pacific Islander alone (NH)	2	0	0	0.02%	0.00%	0.00%
Other race alone (NH)	24	8	31	0.19%	0.06%	0.24%
Mixed race or Multiracial (NH)	140	193	626	1.12%	1.50%	4.84%
Hispanic or Latino (any race)	433	706	933	3.46%	5.48%	7.21%
Total	12,530	12,875	12,941	100.00%	100.00%	100.00%

=== 2020 census ===
As of the 2020 census, Woodhaven had a population of 12,941. The median age was 42.1 years. 20.1% of residents were under the age of 18 and 19.6% of residents were 65 years of age or older. For every 100 females there were 93.9 males, and for every 100 females age 18 and over there were 90.8 males age 18 and over.

100.0% of residents lived in urban areas, while 0.0% lived in rural areas.

There were 5,373 households in Woodhaven, of which 27.0% had children under the age of 18 living in them. Of all households, 47.1% were married-couple households, 19.1% were households with a male householder and no spouse or partner present, and 27.4% were households with a female householder and no spouse or partner present. About 30.4% of all households were made up of individuals and 11.8% had someone living alone who was 65 years of age or older.

There were 5,570 housing units, of which 3.5% were vacant. The homeowner vacancy rate was 0.9% and the rental vacancy rate was 6.0%.

Racial composition as of the 2020 census
Race	Number	Percent
White	10,316	79.7%
Black or African American	999	7.7%
American Indian and Alaska Native	40	0.3%
Asian	314	2.4%
Native Hawaiian and Other Pacific Islander	0	0.0%
Some other race	183	1.4%
Two or more races	1,089	8.4%

=== 2010 census ===
As of the census of 2010, there were 12,875 people, 5,159 households, and 3,535 families residing in the city. The population density was 2,014.9 inhabitants per square mile (778.0/km^{2}). There were 5,508 housing units at an average density of 862.0 per square mile (332.8/km^{2}). The racial makeup of the city was 88.9% White, 5.3% African American, 0.3% Native American, 2.3% Asian, 1.3% from other races, and 1.9% from two or more races. Hispanic or Latino of any race were 5.5% of the population.

There were 5,159 households, of which 30.8% had children under the age of 18 living with them, 52.8% were married couples living together, 11.0% had a female householder with no husband present, 4.7% had a male householder with no wife present, and 31.5% were non-families. 26.4% of all households were made up of individuals, and 6.5% had someone living alone who was 65 years of age or older. The average household size was 2.46 and the average family size was 3.00.

The median age in the city was 40.3 years. 22.3% of residents were under the age of 18; 8.7% were between the ages of 18 and 24; 25.7% were from 25 to 44; 31.4% were from 45 to 64; and 11.9% were 65 years of age or older. The gender makeup of the city was 49.5% male and 50.5% female.

=== 2000 census ===
As of the census of 2000, there were 12,530 people, 4,708 households, and 3,436 families residing in the city. The population density was 1,936.6 inhabitants per square mile (747.7/km^{2}). There were 4,850 housing units at an average density of 749.6 per square mile (289.4/km^{2}). The racial makeup of the city was 93.22% White, 2.33% African American, 0.49% Native American, 1.64% Asian, 0.02% Pacific Islander, 0.84% from other races, and 1.48% from two or more races. Hispanic or Latino of any race were 3.46% of the population.

There were 4,708 households, out of which 35.0% had children under the age of 18 living with them, 60.3% were married couples living together, 9.4% had a female householder with no husband present, and 27.0% were non-families. 22.5% of all households were made up of individuals, and 3.9% had someone living alone who was 65 years of age or older. The average household size was 2.63 and the average family size was 3.11.

In the city, the population was spread out, with 24.6% under the age of 18, 10.0% from 18 to 24, 30.0% from 25 to 44, 28.5% from 45 to 64, and 7.0% who were 65 years of age or older. The median age was 36 years. For every 100 females, there were 97.0 males. For every 100 females age 18 and over, there were 94.2 males.

The median income for a household in the city was $64,954, and the median income for a family was $75,813. Males had a median income of $52,584 versus $32,742 for females. The per capita income for the city was $27,759. About 1.5% of families and 3.3% of the population were below the poverty line, including 2.8% of those under age 18 and 3.2% of those age 65 or over.

== Education ==
Woodhaven-Brownstown School District serves most of Woodhaven, while the southernmost portion of the city is served by Gibraltar School District.

== Highways ==
- I-75 runs north–south through the center of Woodhaven
- US 25 was a U.S. highway that was decommissioned in 1973. It ran along the current Dix–Toledo Road, which runs through a small portion of the city's northwest corner.
- M-85 touches along the far southeastern corner but does not actually run through the city

== Notable Locations ==
=== Woodhaven Stamping Plant ===
Woodhaven is home to Ford Motor Company's Woodhaven Stamping Plant. The facility opened in Woodhaven in 1964. It is located on the north side of West Road, near I-75. The plant produces metal stampings for Ford assembly plants, including body panels and chassis components. The plant site sits on 360 acres of land and has 2,673,000 square feet (248,300 m^{2}) of shop floor space. As of 2025, the facility employs approximately 487 employees. Approximately 418 of these employees are hourly.

=== Woodhaven Commons ===
The development of what is now the city's main retail area, centered on the intersection of Allen and West Roads, began with the 1971 opening of Kmart. At the time, two gas stations had already existed. Other stores followed.

=== Woodhaven Village Square ===
In the late 1990s, the Mobil Oil Refinery and canning site at the west side of Allen Road was demolished, and the site was replaced with the Woodhaven Village Square between 2001 and 2005.
