= Gibraltar, Michigan =

- City
- City of Gibraltar
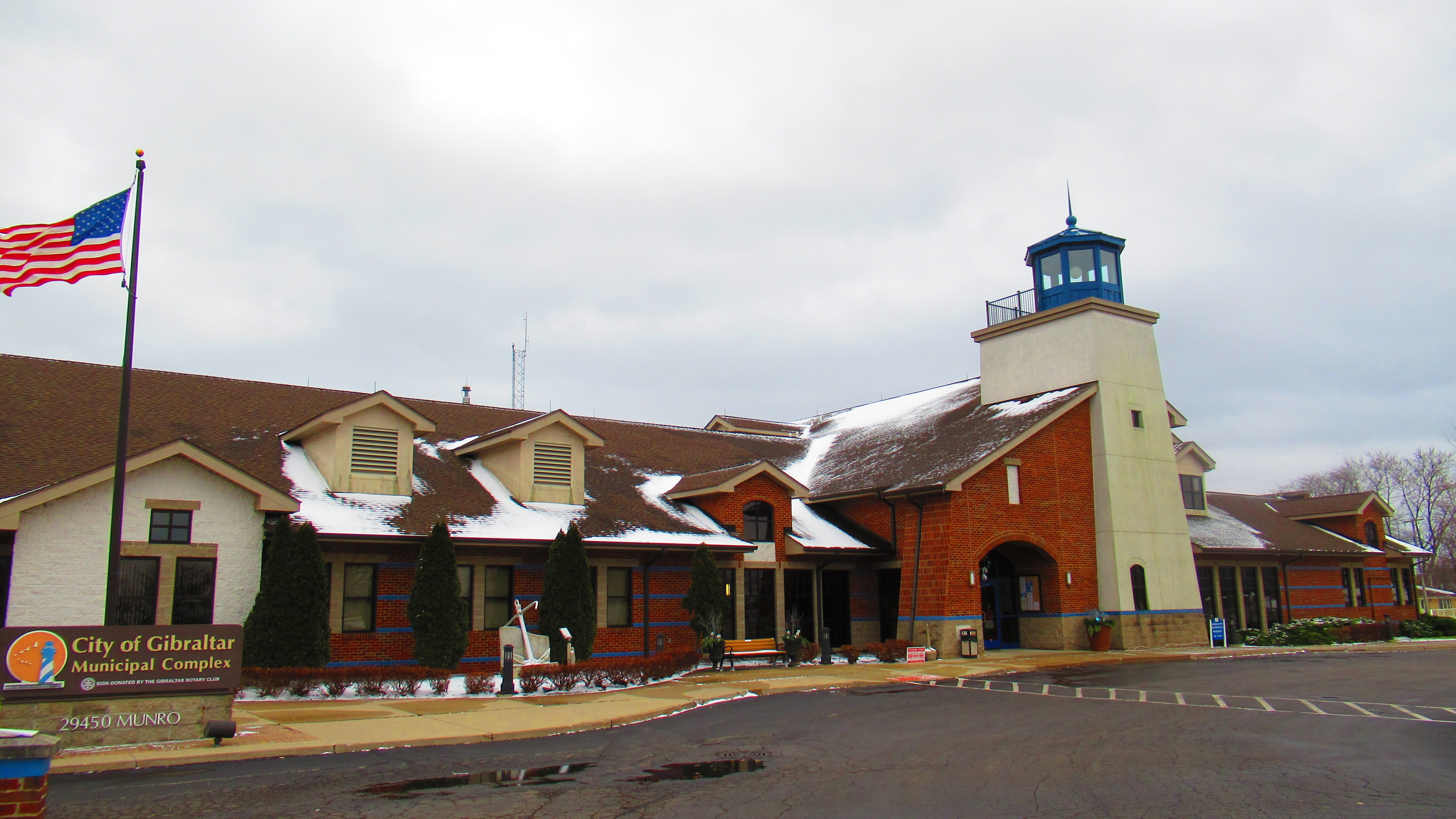
- City of Gibraltar Municipal Complex

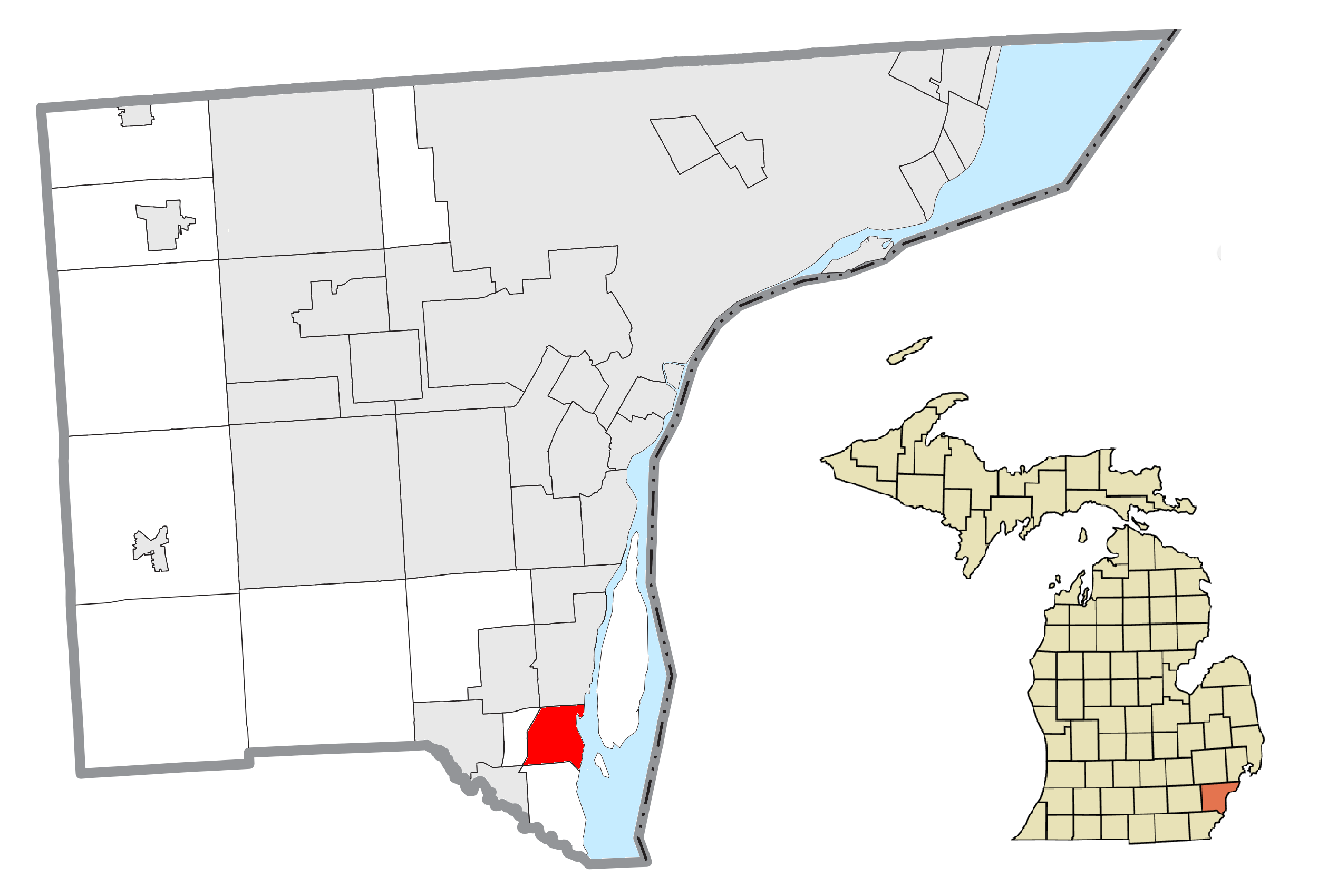
- Location within Wayne County

- Location within the State of Michigan Location within the United States
- Coordinates: 42°05′29″N 83°11′50″W
- Country: United States
- State: Michigan
- County: Wayne
- Settled: 1811
- Incorporated: 1954 (village); 1961 (city)

Government
  - Type: Council-manager
  - Mayor: Garrett Shumate
  - Administrator: Vincent Pastue

Area
  - City: 4.41 sq mi (11.42 km^{2})
  - Land: 3.69 sq mi (9.55 km^{2})
  - Water: 0.72 sq mi (1.87 km^{2})
- Elevation: 581 ft (177 m)

Population (2020)
  - City: 4,997
  - Density: 1,355.4/sq mi (523.31/km^{2})
  - Metro: 4,285,832 (Metro Detroit)
- Time zone: UTC-5 (EST)
  - Summer (DST): UTC-4 (EDT)
- ZIP code(s): 48173 (Rockwood); 48183 (Trenton)
- Area code: 734
- FIPS code: 26-32020
- GNIS feature ID: 0626782
- Website: cityofgibraltarmi.gov

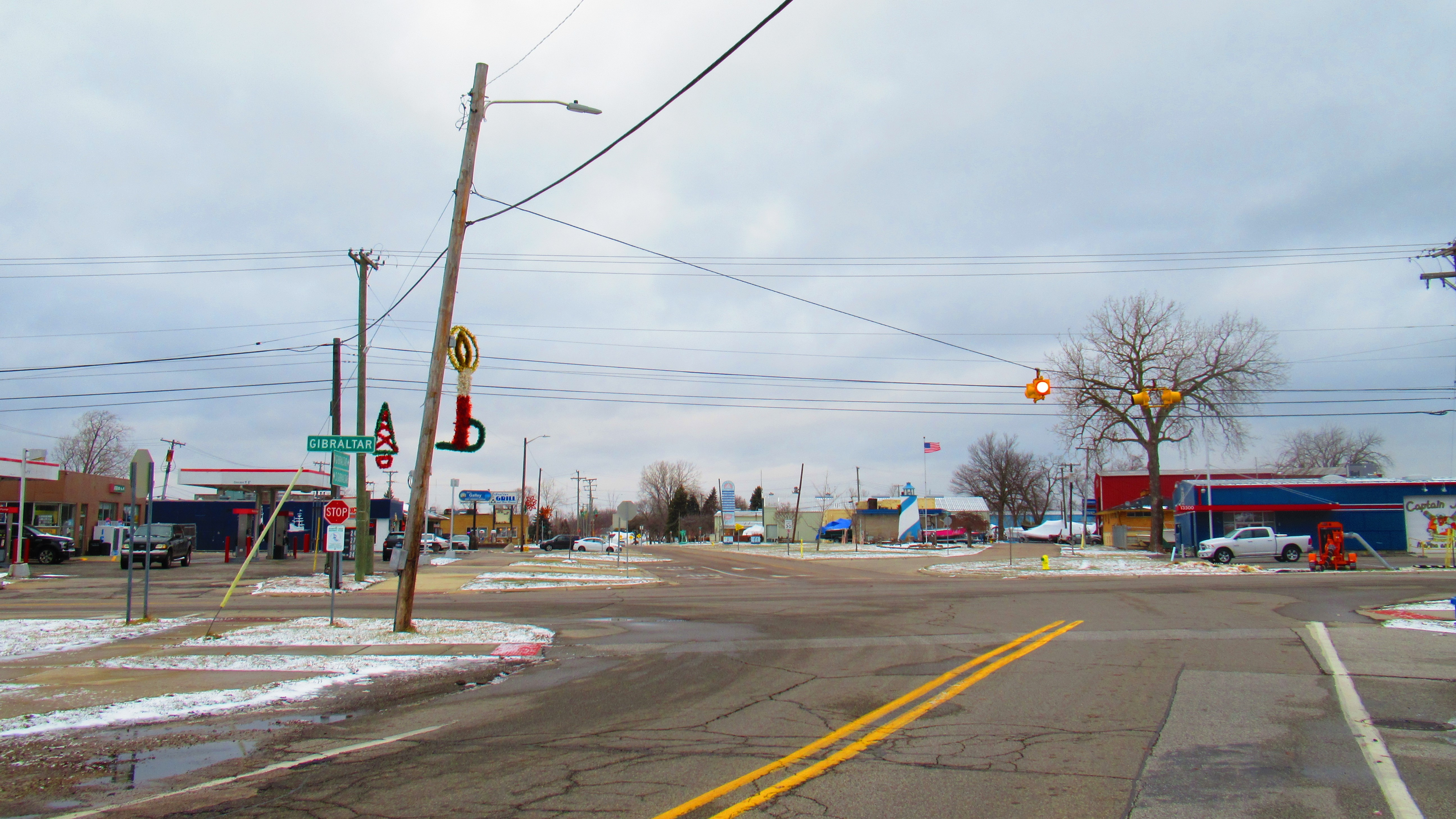
Gibraltar Street intersection

Gibraltar is a city in Wayne County in the U.S. state of Michigan. A Downriver suburb of Detroit, Gibraltar is located roughly 22 miles (35.4 km) southwest of downtown Detroit. As of the 2020 census, the city had a population of 4,997.

== History ==
Gibraltar was first settled as early as 1811 and later platted on March 14, 1837, by trustees of the Gibralter & Flat Rock Company. The community received its first post office under the name "Gibralter" on October 2, 1837. The post office was renamed to Woodbury on December 8, 1838, but renamed back to Gibralter on May 13, 1839. The spelling was changed to "Gibraltar" on December 19, 1900, until it was discontinued entirely on January 31, 1910. The community of Gibraltar was originally part of Brownstown Township. It incorporated as a village in 1954 and gained autonomy when it became a city in 1961.

== Geography ==
According to the United States Census Bureau, the city has a total area of 4.41 square miles (11.42 km^{2}), of which 3.78 square miles (9.79 km^{2}) is land and 0.63 square miles (1.63 km^{2}) (14.29%) is water.

== Demographics ==
Historical population
Census	Pop.	Note	%±
1960	2,196		—
1970	3,842		75.0%
1980	4,458		16.0%
1990	4,297		−3.6%
2000	4,264		−0.8%
2010	4,656		9.2%
2020	4,997		7.3%
U.S. Decennial Census

=== Racial and ethnic composition ===
Gibraltar city, Michigan – Racial and ethnic composition Note: the US Census treats Hispanic/Latino as an ethnic category. This table excludes Latinos from the racial categories and assigns them to a separate category. Hispanics/Latinos may be of any race.
Race / Ethnicity (NH = Non-Hispanic)	Pop 2000	Pop 2010	Pop 2020	% 2000	% 2010	% 2020
White alone (NH)	4,078	4,314	4,251	95.64%	92.65%	85.07%
Black or African American alone (NH)	22	92	198	0.52%	1.98%	3.96%
Native American or Alaska Native alone (NH)	13	16	17	0.30%	0.34%	0.34%
Asian alone (NH)	17	34	50	0.40%	0.73%	1.00%
Native Hawaiian or Pacific Islander alone (NH)	0	5	0	0.00%	0.11%	0.00%
Other race alone (NH)	0	0	19	0.00%	0.00%	0.38%
Mixed race or Multiracial (NH)	56	58	240	1.31%	1.25%	4.80%
Hispanic or Latino (any race)	78	137	222	1.83%	2.94%	4.44%
Total	4,264	4,656	4,997	100.00%	100.00%	100.00%

=== 2020 census ===
As of the 2020 census, Gibraltar had a population of 4,997. The median age was 44.3 years. 19.5% of residents were under the age of 18 and 19.2% of residents were 65 years of age or older. For every 100 females there were 96.8 males, and for every 100 females age 18 and over there were 96.1 males age 18 and over.

100.0% of residents lived in urban areas, while 0.0% lived in rural areas.

There were 2,127 households in Gibraltar, of which 26.0% had children under the age of 18 living in them. Of all households, 46.0% were married-couple households, 20.5% were households with a male householder and no spouse or partner present, and 25.0% were households with a female householder and no spouse or partner present. About 28.4% of all households were made up of individuals and 12.2% had someone living alone who was 65 years of age or older.

There were 2,245 housing units, of which 5.3% were vacant. The homeowner vacancy rate was 0.7% and the rental vacancy rate was 5.2%.

Racial composition as of the 2020 census
Race	Number	Percent
White	4,321	86.5%
Black or African American	199	4.0%
American Indian and Alaska Native	19	0.4%
Asian	50	1.0%
Native Hawaiian and Other Pacific Islander	0	0.0%
Some other race	66	1.3%
Two or more races	342	6.8%

=== 2010 census ===
As of the census of 2010, there were 4,656 people, 1,946 households, and 1,283 families living in the city. The population density was 1,231.7 inhabitants per square mile (475.6/km^{2}). There were 2,217 housing units at an average density of 586.5 per square mile (226.4/km^{2}). The racial makeup of the city was 94.7% White, 2.0% African American, 0.4% Native American, 0.7% Asian, 0.1% Pacific Islander, 0.6% from other races, and 1.6% from two or more races. Hispanic or Latino of any race were 2.9% of the population.

There were 1,946 households, of which 29.2% had children under the age of 18 living with them, 48.2% were married couples living together, 12.4% had a female householder with no husband present, 5.3% had a male householder with no wife present, and 34.1% were non-families. 27.8% of all households were made up of individuals, and 10% had someone living alone who was 65 years of age or older. The average household size was 2.39 and the average family size was 2.92.

The median age in the city was 41.4 years. 22% of residents were under the age of 18; 7.8% were between the ages of 18 and 24; 24.9% were from 25 to 44; 31.1% were from 45 to 64; and 14.2% were 65 years of age or older. The gender makeup of the city was 49.9% male and 50.1% female.

=== 2000 census ===
As of the census of 2000, there were 4,264 people, 1,728 households, and 1,225 families living in the city. The population density was 1,109.1 inhabitants per square mile (428.2/km^{2}). There were 1,791 housing units at an average density of 465.9 per square mile (179.9/km^{2}). The racial makeup of the city was 96.74% White, 0.52% African American, 0.33% Native American, 0.40% Asian, 0.59% from other races, and 1.43% from two or more races. Hispanic or Latino of any race were 1.83% of the population.

There were 1,728 households, out of which 31.3% had children under the age of 18 living with them, 56.0% were married couples living together, 10.1% had a female householder with no husband present, and 29.1% were non-families. 23.3% of all households were made up of individuals, and 5.5% had someone living alone who was 65 years of age or older. The average household size was 2.46 and the average family size was 2.89.

In the city, 23.5% of the population was under the age of 18, 7.9% from 18 to 24, 31.5% from 25 to 44, 28.2% from 45 to 64, and 8.9% who were 65 years of age or older. The median age was 38 years. For every 100 females, there were 101.7 males. For every 100 females age 18 and over, there were 100.1 males.

The median income for a household in the city was $58,167, and the median income for a family was $67,457. Males had a median income of $53,750 versus $31,708 for females. The per capita income for the city was $28,528. About 1.9% of families and 2.7% of the population were below the poverty line, including 1.3% of those under age 18 and 3.2% of those age 65 or over.

== Education ==
Public education is provided by the Gibraltar School District, serving all of Gibraltar, all of Rockwood, portions of Woodhaven, and portions of Brownstown Township. The school district operates these schools in Gibraltar:

- Parsons Elementary School
- Shumate Middle School
- Carlson High School
