= Fox Island =

Island in the Detroit River, Michigan

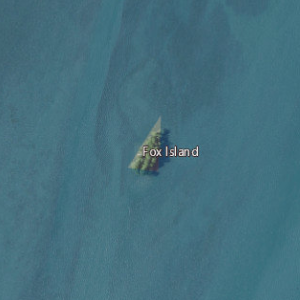
- USGS aerial imagery of Fox Island

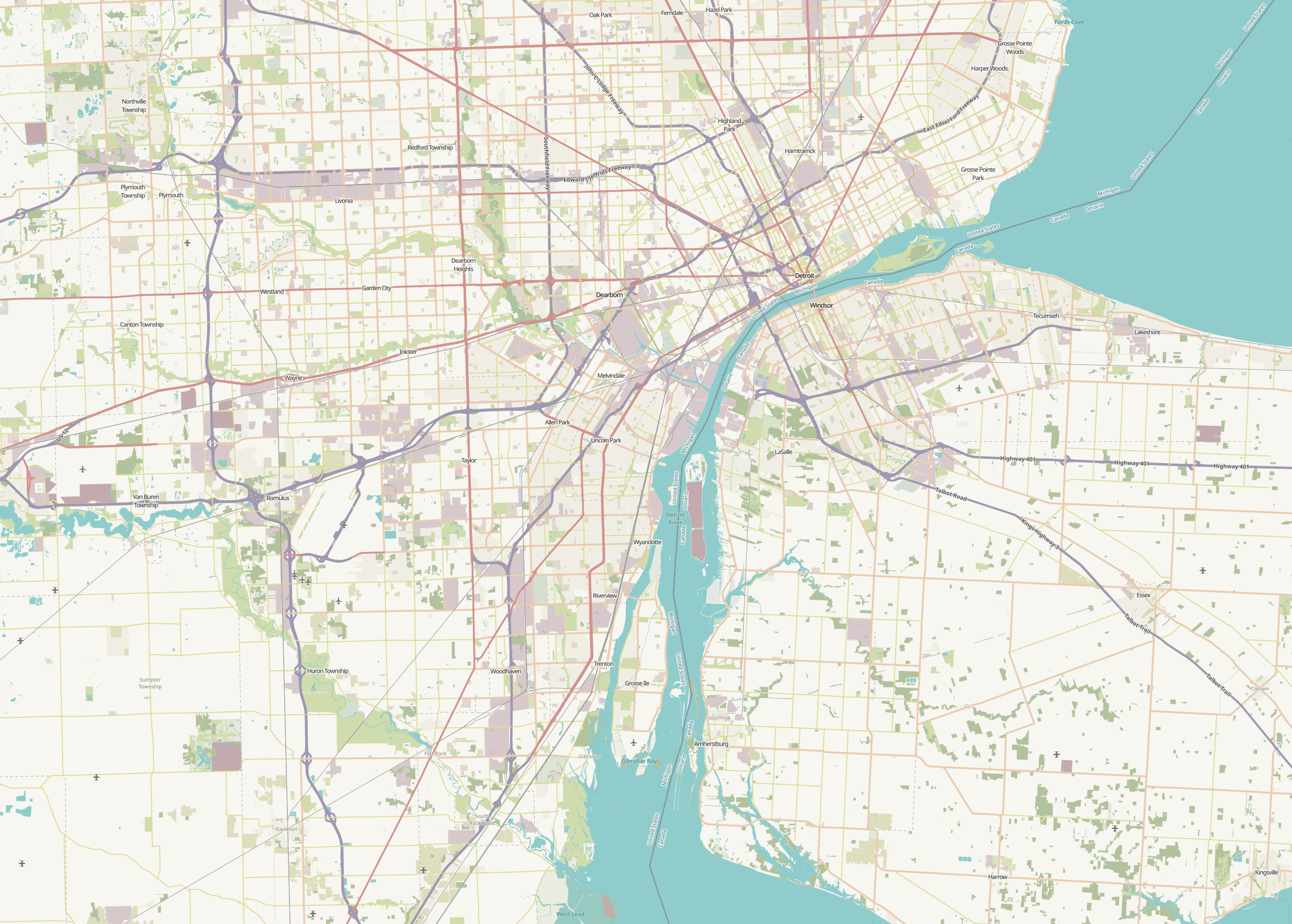
- Location within Wayne County, Michigan Location within Michigan Location within the United States

Geography
- Location: Michigan
- Coordinates: 42°06′21″N 83°08′30″W
- Highest elevation: 587 ft (178.9 m)

Administration
- United States
- State: Michigan
- County: Wayne

Fox Island is a naturally formed island in the Detroit River, in southeast Michigan, United States. In the late 1800s, it was used by the Dunbar & Sullivan Company to store explosives used for engineering projects in the Detroit River's shipping channels. When this was forbidden by a court injunction following an 1879 explosion, the company constructed Powder House Island several hundred yards to the east and relocated their explosive facilities there. Since then, Fox Island has served as a picnic location and campsite; in the early 20th century, it was the site of a vacation home owned by C. F. Parent. The island is now privately owned, but remains a fishing spot (notably for perch).

== Geography ==
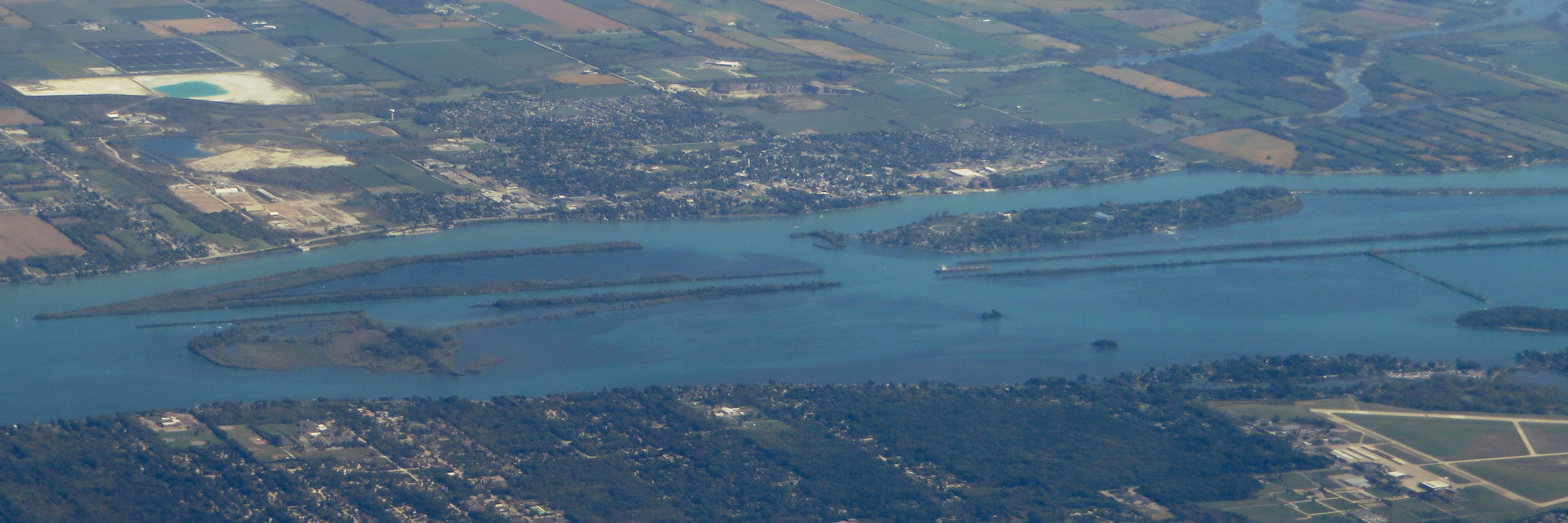

1	Amherstburg, Ontario
2	Crystal Island
3	Bois Blanc Island
4	Stony Island

5	Powder House Island
6	Fox Island
7	Sugar Island
8	Grosse Ile, Michigan

Fox Island's coordinates are 42°06′21″N 83°08′30″W, in Wayne County. Its position in the Detroit River is downstream of Lake St. Clair, Belle Isle and Fighting Island; it is located to the east of Detroit, between Grosse Ile and Bois Blanc Island. It is approximately 1,100 yd (3,300 ft; 1,000 m) from the water border between the United States and Canada. The closest land features to Fox Island are Elba Island, approximately 450 yd (1,350 ft; 410 m) to the west, and Powder House Island, approximately 500 yd (1,500 ft; 460 m) to the east; other features in the vicinity include Stony Island (Michigan) to the north, the Canadian Crystal Island to the northeast, Sugar Island to the south, and Meso and Hickory Islands to the southwest. The United States Geological Survey (USGS) gave its elevation as 587 ft (179 m) in 1980.

Fox Island has existed as long as humans have inhabited the surrounding region. An 1871 article about the section of the Detroit River near Grosse Ile described the area:

The river and lake view is beautiful. The broad expanse of Detroit River lying between Grosse Isle on the one side, Stoney Island, Fox Island, Bois Blanc Island, Sugar Island, Hickory Island, and Elba Island on the other, furnish ample room for sail and row boats and for fishing, not only secure from all danger from the numerous steamers and vessels, which are constantly passing, but from storms.

1851 references to Fox Island give its area as 0.81 acres (0.33 ha); in 1908 it was described as "2 acres solid soil" (0.81 ha). The island is home to many types of fish, and is known as a good spot for perch, which have been there since at least the 1880s. A 1982 report by the U.S. Fish and Wildlife Service described channel catfish spawning on its shores. In 1903, a sturgeon fishing operation based out of the island was "supposed to be the best in the United States".

== History ==
Historical records of Fox Island can be difficult to locate, since there are more than a dozen Fox Islands in the English-speaking world; within the lower peninsula of Michigan alone, there are two others (North Fox Island and South Fox Island, both in Leelanau County). Nonetheless, the Fox Island in the Detroit River is shown on survey maps of the area in the early 19th century; it appears on an 1818 United States government survey by Joseph Fletcher and Edward Tiffin. The Detroit Free Press made references as early as 1846 to a "Fox Island" in the specific context of the Detroit River.

Fox Island was initially deeded on June 22, 1829, on which date the United States granted it to Sarah Macomb along with several other parcels. After a hearing on November 26, 1850, concluded a chancery case regarding the island, an announcement of a chancery sale was issued on December 27 by William Gray, Master in Chancery of Wayne County. The Wayne County Circuit Court was to hold a public auction for Fox Island (in addition to Sugar, Hickory, Celeron and Calf Islands, and three additional parcels of land on Grosse Ile); on February 19, the auction was held, and the islands were sold.

In 1868, a young boy was found drowned in the river near Fox Island; he was identified as Charles Maurice, who had recently gone missing nearby; an inquest found that the drowning was accidental, and he was buried on the island. In 1879, another accident occurred, in which Wilbur R. Tillinghast (the rector of Holy Trinity Church) died during a church camping trip.

=== Dynamite operations ===
In the late 19th century, Fox Island saw use by the Dunbar & Sullivan Company, a government contractor charged with deepening and widening shipping channels in the Detroit River (specifically, deepening the Lime-Kiln Crossing. Dunbar & Sullivan, who would later build facilities on nearby Powder House Island and Stony Island, used Fox Island to store dynamite. The powder house, situated on the west side of the island, was 16 ft (4.9 m) wide and 24 ft (7.3 m) long and had previously been stocked with some three tons of nitroglycerin.

On December 12, 1879, the nitroglycerin detonated without warning. While nobody was injured in the explosion, the shock wave destroyed the windows and chimneys of nearby houses, and was "plainly felt" as far as 36 mi (58 km) away. A telegraph operator at the Canada Southern ferry landing on Stony Island, approximately 1.5 mi (2.4 km) north of Fox Island, said that his cabin "swayed and creaked, the timbers yielded and parted, and the wires were tightened to such an extent that he expected to see the whole structure go by the board". The noise, heard in Wyandotte (9 mi (14 km) away) as "heavier than that of artillery fired close at hand", was audible in the city of St. Clair, some 60 mi (97 km) to the north:

Noises were heard in various houses in this city, principally on the higher parts, thirty-five or forty feet above the St. Clair River, the character of the sound being described as nearly the same, similar to a blow or shaking on a door. My impression was that it was an earthquake, for the vibration was the same that I have experienced in the West India Islands in slight shocks. As this was doubtless caused by an earthwave arising from the Fox Island explosion, the amove information may be interesting from a scientific point of view, showing the distances to which such vibrations extend.

The next morning, Thomas Dunbar and Henry Duff visited the island to assess the damage; they found the island "torn and rent", with large trees uprooted and torn into strange positions. "Not a particle" of the explosives' tin packaging could be found, and no trace of the original building remained; where it stood, there was a crater 60 ft (18 m) wide and 16 ft (4.9 m) deep. While the bottom of the crater was below the water level in the river outside, its inside was dry, as "the sand seemed closely packed as to prevent the entrance of [water]".

It is unclear whether the explosion was accidental, or deliberate; there had been reports of suspicious lights on the island on previous nights, and it was noted by demolition experts that "had the whole amount in the building exploded, the island would have been stripped of every tree and far greater damage done to the houses at Amherstburg and Grosse Ile". As the three tons of nitroglycerin was valued at around $5,000 (equivalent to $173,000 in 2025), it was suspected that a large portion may have been stolen beforehand, and the rest intentionally destroyed to conceal evidence of the theft.

On March 16, 1880, an injunction was granted prohibiting Charles F. Dunbar and Daniel B. Reaume from "storing nitroglycerine or any other explosive material on Fox Island"; on May 2, Dunbar and Reaume requested that the injunction be dissolved, on the basis of the "importance of the work [...] deepening the channel at Lime-Kiln Crossing". Another explosion would occur at Dunbar's worksite at the Lime Kiln Crossing in September 1880; while no deaths occurred as a result of the explosion, it destroyed a scow, shattered windows on nearby vessels, shook houses in Amherstburg "to their foundations", and could be felt in Essex Center 16 mi (26 km) away. Subsequently, the request to dissolve the injunction was denied without cost on November 23.

The explosions became a target for satire. The October 1, 1880, edition of the Detroit Free Press, said:

We have a very important announcement to make. The Czar of Russia is in America. He is, in fact, hiding within twenty miles of Detroit. He left somebody to act Czar and run Russia for him, while he tried to have a little peace and rest. He arrived in this country last fall and took up his residence on Fox Island, a little bit of land in a lonely part of the Detroit River, far from the track of vessels. Everyone will remember the tremendous nitro-glycerine explosion which took place a while ago on Fox Island. It shook the windows 100 miles away. It caught the Czar just as he was splitting wood to prepeare his noonday meal and it landed him in a haystack thirteen miles southwest of Toledo. The Czar was never found. As the Czar left Fox Island so suddenly, he hadn't time to take even a nickel along with him and so had to walk into Toledo. He was put off seven Canada Southern trains before he reached Amherstsburg. With tears in his eyes Alexander told a reporter of The Free Press that he thought it wasn't likely that lightning would strike twice in the same place, so he again took up his residence among the lower islands of the Detroit, and spent the time fishing at Lime-Kiln Crossing. The second day, just as he had hooked on the biggest perch of the season, the water seemed to heave up under him and instead of landing the fish he was himself landed on a tree top near Essex Center, Ontario, some sixteen miles inland. Again he was short of cash and it took ten trains to take him consecutively into Detroit and over then he had to walk from the Junction to The Free Press office, where he arrived at a quarter past 6 last evening. It was supposed to be the drill scow that blew up in the Detroit River last week, but his Majesty knows better. It was the Nihilists.

In 1881, work on the Lime-Kiln Crossing was continuing, and the issue of nitroglycerin storage needed to be resolved. By May, construction was underway on an artificial island several hundred yards to the east of Fox Island, built up from the river floor with rock excavated from the channel. Between eight and ten carpenters, under the direction of John P. Jones, were tasked with building a scow. While the new island was initially referred to as "Dunbar Island", it eventually became known as "Powder House Island"; the dynamite operations of Dunbar's company eventually moved there, and Fox Island was abandoned.

=== After dynamite operations ===
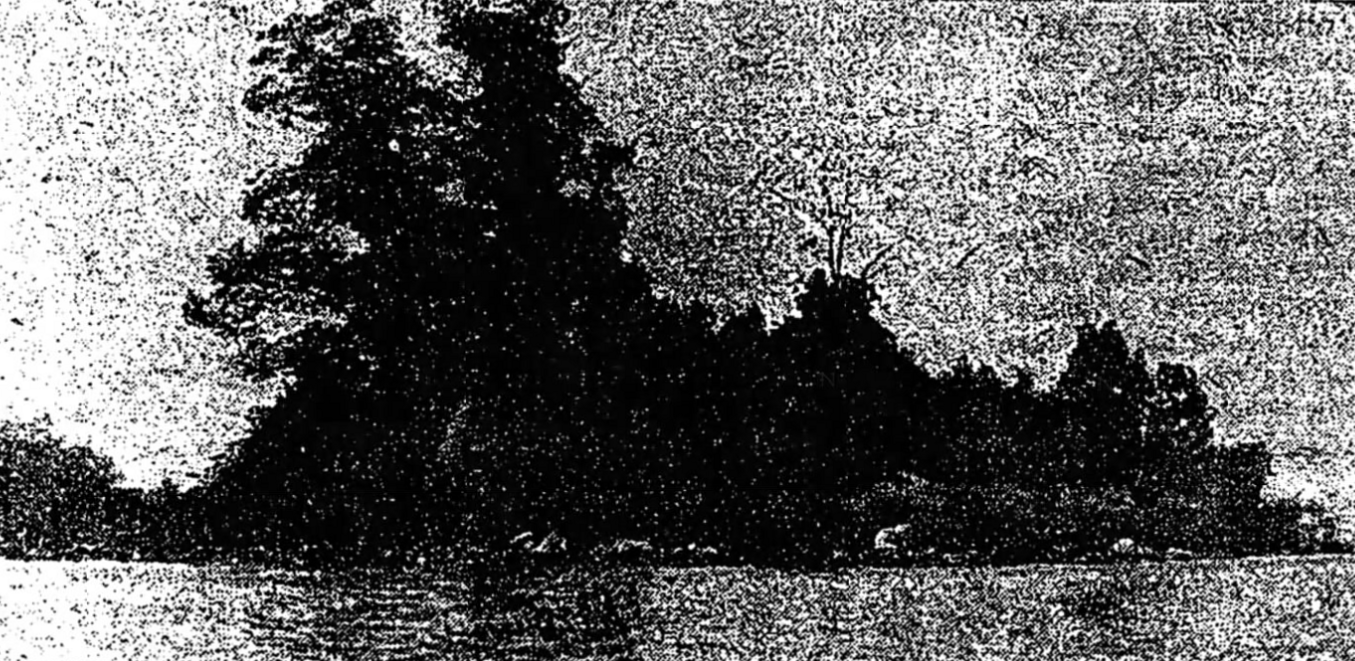
The island in 1903

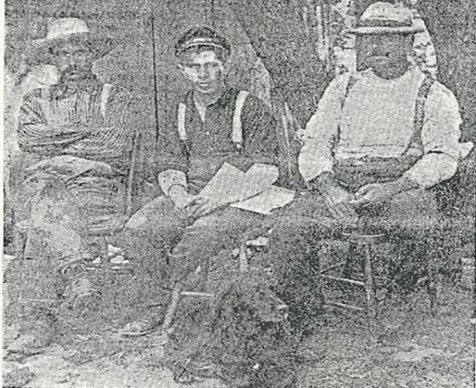
Fishermen on the island in 1903.

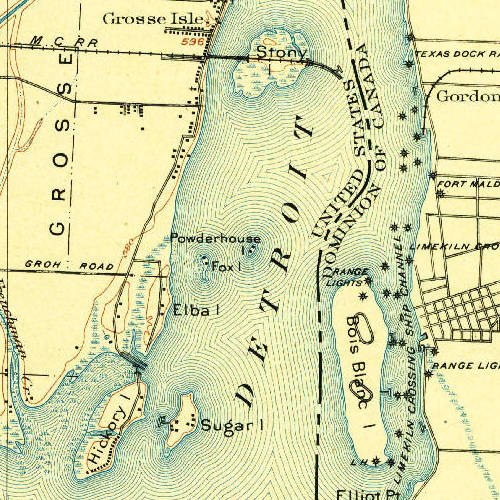
Fox Island, as it appeared on a 1906 USGS map.

Fox Island, while no longer used for commercial or industrial purposes, remained a destination for boaters and fishers; in 1884, recreational boaters found a dog howling on Fox Island and brought it safely to Elba Island. One picnic, on July 30, 1886, was attended by "about 100 hands employed in the carpenter and joiner shop at Mara & Sons".

In May 1902, the Detroit Free Press said: "The sturgeon fishing at Fox Island, at the mouth of the Detroit River, is better this year than it has been before in many years. Where the fishermen usually catch three or four per week, they are catching ten and fifteen per day, the fish averaging from 75 to 125 pounds each." In July of that year, a camping ground and cottage were offered for rent on Fox Island.

On June 27, 1906, Dunbar's dynamite facilities, now located on the recently constructed Powder House Island, would again explode. No deaths occurred, but two men were injured, when 20 short tons (18,000 kg) of dynamite detonated; thousands of windows were shattered on Grosse Ile alone, plate glass was broken 3 miles (4.8 km) away in Trenton, and the shockwave from the explosion was felt as far as Cleveland, Ohio, 85 mi (137 km) away on the other side of Lake Erie. The cause of the explosion was not known with certainty, as it had been a hot day, but it was suspected to be related to Rogers and Perry firing revolvers near the dynamite storage area immediately before it exploded.

In 1908, Fox Island was put up for sale, in an advertisement saying it could "be made the most delightful residence spot on the Detroit River". It was eventually purchased by C.F. Parent, who in 1909 sought to build a large summer home on the island (and to secure electric lighting for Grosse Ile from Trenton). In 1949, a man was brought to safety on Fox Island after a fishing boat capsized in the Detroit River, although his companion could not be saved.

Presently, the area surrounding the island is used for perch fishing; as of 2012, the island was privately owned.
