= Powder House Island =

Island in Michigan, United States

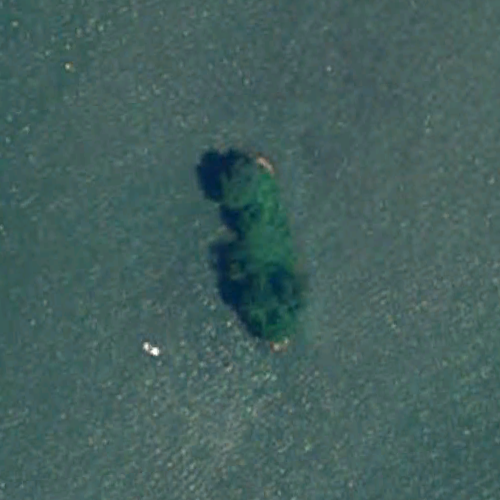
- 2005 USDA aerial imagery of Powder House Island
- Interactive map of Powder House Island

Geography
- Location: Southeast Michigan
- Coordinates: 42°06′26″N 83°08′08″W
- Adjacent to: Detroit River
- Highest elevation: 574 ft (175 m)

Administration
- United States
- State: Michigan
- County: Wayne
- Township: Grosse Ile

Powder House Island (also known as Dynamite Island) is an artificial island on the lower Detroit River in southeast Michigan, directly adjacent to the Canada–United States border. It was constructed in the late 1880s by the Dunbar & Sullivan Company to store explosives during their dredging of the Livingstone Channel, with the purpose of circumventing an 1880 court order forbidding the company to store explosives on nearby Fox Island.

Powder House Island was the location of dynamite storage sheds, as well as a dynamite factory and several ice houses. During this time, it was the site of a series of accidents, including fires in 1895 and 1919 (which both burned the island "to the water's edge"). Twenty short tons (18,000 kg) of the island's dynamite exploded in 1906 after two men "had been shooting with a revolver" near it; while there were no deaths (and only minor injuries to the two men), windows were shattered 3 mi (4.8 km) away and the explosion was clearly audible from 85 mi (137 km) away.

After the completion of the Livingstone Channel in 1912, the island continued to be used for storing explosives, including during later projects to deepen the channel in the 1930s. By the 1980s it was completely unused, and by 2015 the island was owned by the Michigan Department of Natural Resources, managed by its Wildlife Division as part of the Pointe Mouillee State Game Area, and accessible to the public for hunting.

== Geography ==
Powder House Island is contained within Grosse Ile Township, in Wayne County, Michigan. It is near the southern end of the Detroit River, closer to Lake Erie than to Lake St. Clair, and around 200 ft (0.04 mi; 60 m) from the water border with Canada. It is approximately 500 yd (1,500 ft; 460 m) east of Fox Island. Further to its west is Grosse Ile, beyond which is Trenton. To its east, across the Livingstone Channel, is the Canadian Bois Blanc Island (and further, Amherstburg in Ontario). The southern tip of Stony Island is around 700 yd (2,100 ft; 640 m) to the northeast; other islands in the vicinity include Sugar Island to the south and Elba Island to the southwest. The island, which is covered in foliage, is approximately 200 ft (60 m) from north to south, and 50 ft (15 m) from east to west, giving it an approximate area of 10,000 sq ft (930 m^{2}; 0.23 acres). The United States Geological Survey (USGS) gave its elevation as 574 ft (175 m) above sea level in 1980. In Wayne County records, the island is listed as "Dynamite Island", in ZIP code 48138; it is contained within a single parcel (whose total area is given as 0.91 acres (0.37 ha)).

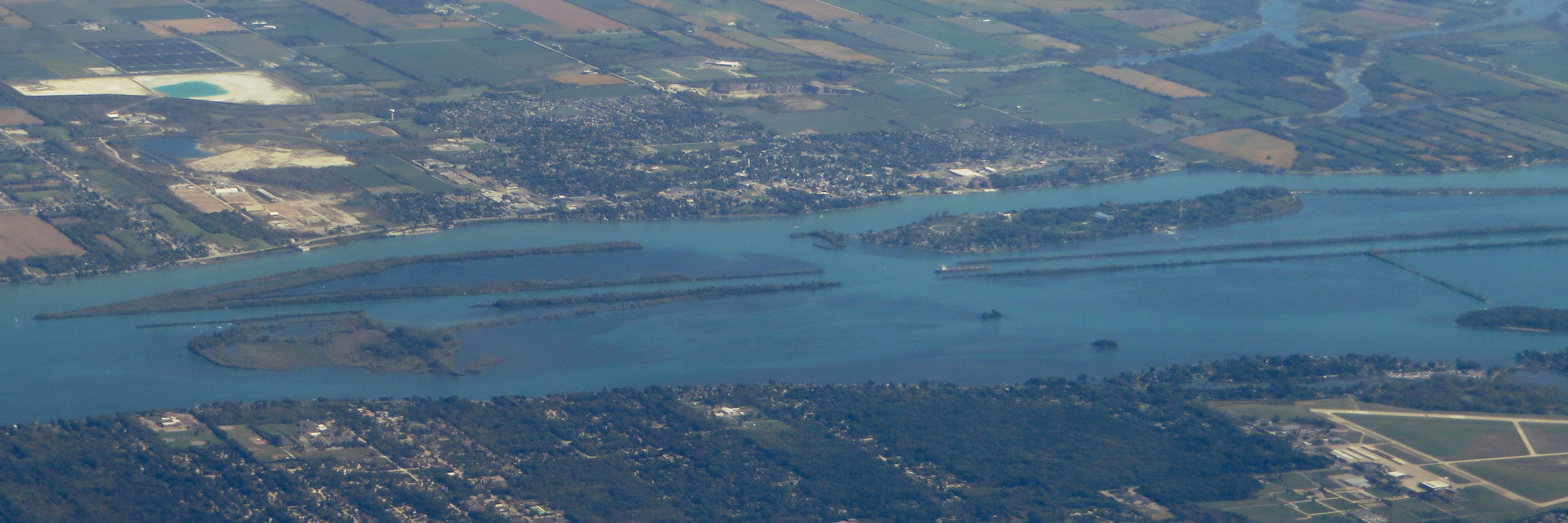

1	Amherstburg, Ontario
2	Crystal Island
3	Bois Blanc Island
4	Stony Island

5	Powder House Island
6	Fox Island
7	Sugar Island
8	Grosse Ile, Michigan

== History ==
=== Background and first explosion ===
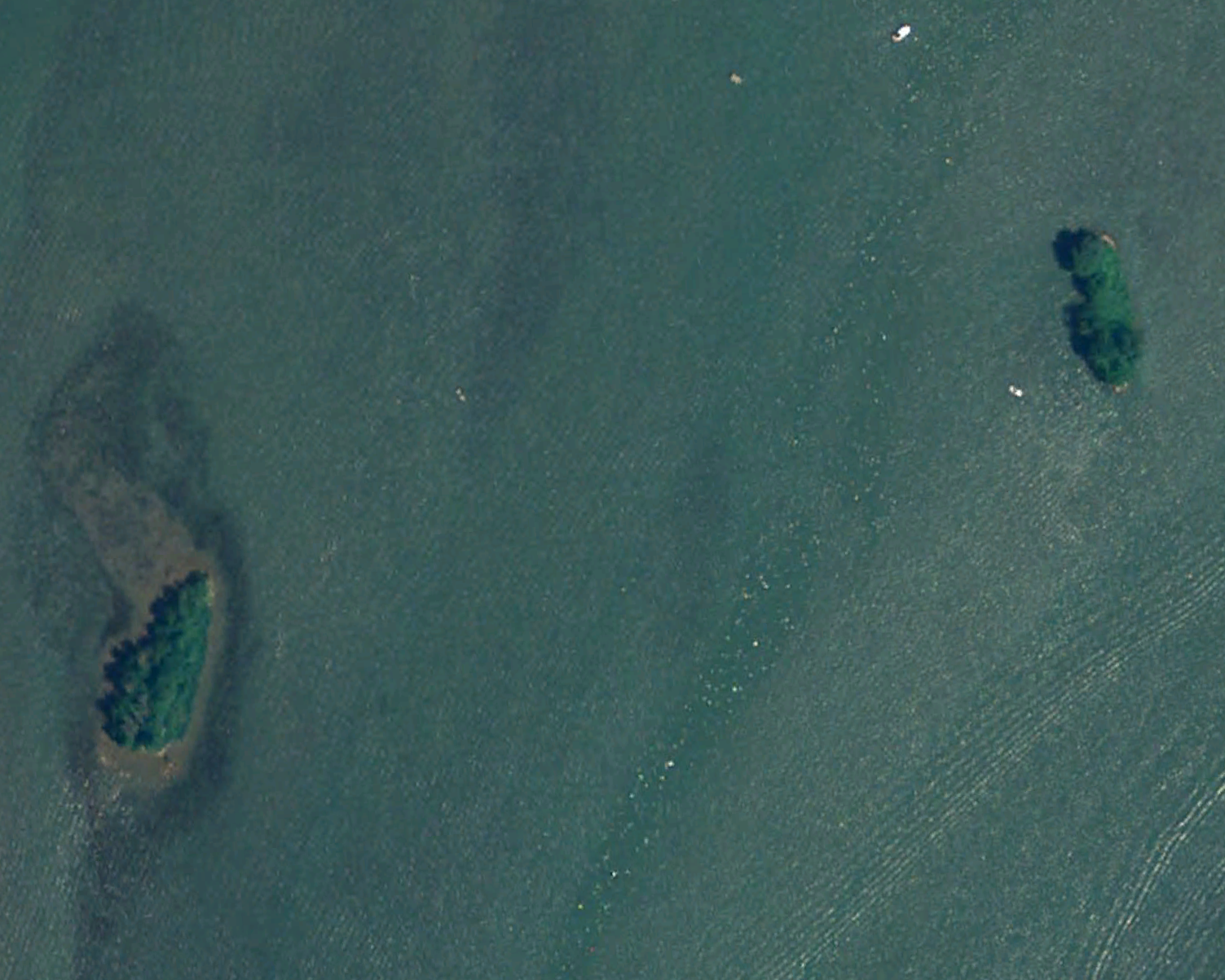
Powder House Island (right) and Fox Island (left) in a 2005 aerial photograph

In the late 19th century, the Dunbar & Sullivan Company won a number of government contracts to widen and deepen shipping channels in the Detroit River, including the Livingstone Channel and Lime-Kiln Crossing. This work involved large amounts of blasting, due to limestone bedrock in the area; the nearby Fox Island was a natural choice for storage of explosive compounds. On December 12, 1879, the three tons (2,700 kg) of nitroglycerin stored on Fox Island detonated unexpectedly, destroying all structures on the island and leaving a crater 60 ft (18 m) wide and 16 ft (4.9 m) deep. The resultant shock wave shattered the windows of nearby houses, and was clearly audible in St. Clair some 60 mi (97 km) to the north.

=== Injunction and second explosion ===
In March 1880, litigation related to the circumstances of the explosion resulted in an injunction being issued by the Wayne County chancery court in the case of Walter Crane v. Charles F. Dunbar et al. The injunction forbade the company's operators, Charles F. Dunbar and Daniel B. Reaume, to engage in "storing nitroglycerine or any other explosive material on Fox Island".

In order to continue work on the channel, it was necessary to store the explosives somewhere; Dunbar and Reaume requested that the injunction be dissolved. Shortly afterwards, however, another explosion occurred at the Lime-Kiln Crossing worksite on September 24, 1880, which shook houses in Amherstburg "to their foundations", and could be felt in the town of Essex 16 mi (26 km) away. Dunbar and Reaume's request was denied in November, and it became evident that a new location would need to be found or created.

=== Construction of new island ===
After the injunction was issued, Dunbar & Sullivan resorted to storing their explosives on a scow anchored several hundred yards to the east of Fox Island. While this allowed work to continue, it was not a permanent solution. The scow had limited capacity; Dunbar & Sullivan had to purchase raw materials and manufacture dynamite, Hercules powder, and other explosive materials themselves at the work site. Storing dynamite would require a much larger facility, which was only practical if situated on solid land.

While Dunbar & Sullivan had been forbidden to store explosives on Fox Island, the location of the worksite meant that there were few other places to do so. The southern extension of Stony Island had not yet been constructed, and all other land within a reasonable distance of the worksite was inhabited. By 1881, houses had been built along the shore of Grosse Ile, and Hickory and Sugar Island were being used as campgrounds; on the Canadian side, Bois Blanc Island was being used for summer vacation homes. It was therefore decided that an artificial island would be constructed next to Fox Island, to which the 1880 injunction (which only stipulated that Dunbar & Sullivan not store explosives on Fox Island specifically) would not apply.

The risks involved in manufacturing and handling explosive devices on the putative artificial island would be largely identical to those incurred by the Fox Island facility—the explosions there had caused damage for miles around, and the new site was only a couple hundred yards away. No additional structures or mechanisms were planned to help contain or redirect the energy of an unintentional detonation; the primary difference between the two sites was that one of them had not existed when the ruling was made, and was therefore (ostensibly) not subject to it. It is unclear why government engineering authorities approved of this reasoning, or indeed that they even did; the Sixth Circuit Court of Appeals later said that "no formal action appears to have been taken by the government or any officer thereof, giving the defendant the right to erect the island [...] all that was shown was at most a verbal permission and an acquiescence on the part of the government officers in charge of the Lime-Kiln Crossing work".

Regardless, by May 1881, construction was underway: between eight and ten carpenters, directed by John P. Jones, were employed in the construction of a scow. This scow was tasked with carrying rock from channel excavation to a site several hundred yards to the east of Fox Island, and dumping it on the river floor. Eventually, the scow was scuttled atop the rock; the resultant mound was high enough to rise above water level.

Once it was large and solid enough to permit the erection of structures, the dynamite operations of Dunbar & Sullivan were moved to the island. While it was initially referred to as "Dunbar Island", it eventually became known as "Powder House Island".

Shanties were erected to contain and shelter the large quantities of dynamite required for channel excavation. They caught fire on April 21, 1895, and the island "burned to the water's edge". In 1904, it was reported that Canadian police had found American poachers, illegally fishing for sturgeon, living in a shack on the island. By 1906, twenty short tons (18,000 kg) of dynamite were stored on the island; a witness was quoted as saying "you could throw a cat through the cracks" in dynamite shanties of questionable quality.

=== Third explosion ===
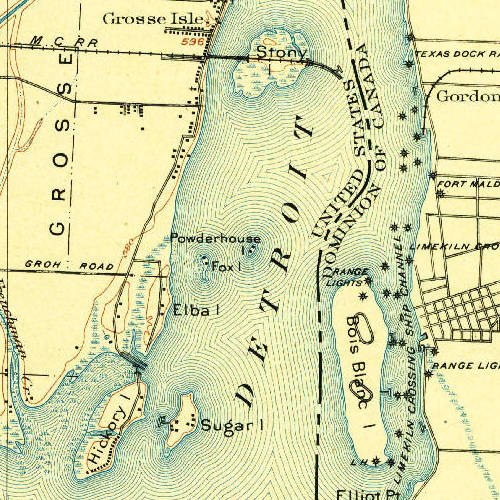
Powder House Island, as it appeared on a 1906 USGS map

On June 27, 1906, the twenty short tons of dynamite in Dunbar & Sullivan's facilities exploded. Powder House Island was shaken by an explosion "so terrific in nature that the residents of the town and pleasure-seekers on adjacent islands thought it was an earthquake visitation". Two men, Henry Rogers and Theodore Perry, were injured; they had just left the island, and were 100 yd (91 m) from the shore, when a sudden explosion launched them from their catboat, tore the clothes from their backs, and caused severe burns and lacerations. The Detroit Free Press described an "immediate cessation of pleasure" which occurred among people in the immediate vicinity. Charles Stedman, a vacationer from Indiana on a trip with his wife and children to Bois Blanc Island, said:

We were sprawled out in the shade of a tree [...] when the shock came. It was the most effective transformation scene I ever witnessed. The river in the vicinity of the dynamite houses was instantly lashed into a seething torrent. Rocks and spray shot hundreds of feet into the air, and the report was followed immediately by a shower of white that I afterward learned was limestone. Big trees were uprooted by the shock, and the one under which we were camped rocked ominously. All was confusion on the picnic grounds. Women shrieked in dismay, and repentant men fell upon their knees and began to offer fervent invocations for divine intercession.

In the aftermath of the explosion, thousands of windows were shattered on Grosse Ile alone, plate glass was broken 3 miles (4.8 km) away in Trenton, and work on the shipping channel was delayed due to the loss of blasting equipment. The shock wave from the explosion was felt as far as Cleveland, Ohio, 85 mi (137 km) away on the other side of Lake Erie. The island itself was described as a "wreck", which needed to be rebuilt with many scowloads of stone and mud. The cause of the explosion was not known with certainty, as it had been a hot day, but it was suspected to be related to Rogers and Perry firing revolvers near the dynamite storage area immediately before it exploded (despite Rogers' claim several days later that the revolvers had been loaded with blanks).

The men said they had been shooting with a revolver, and it is supposed that one of the bullets touched off the fireworks. While admitting that the explosion may have been caused by the heat, experts do not think this theory at all plausible.

The explosion has been the subject of misinformation: a June 28 article in the Detroit Free Press pushed the untrue claim that the explosion had occurred on Fox Island. On July 6, the Yale Expositor, while correctly reporting that the explosion had occurred on Dynamite Island, claimed that there had been 12 short tons (11,000 kg) of explosives across two artificial islands, and that "a keg of one of the explosives was hurled into the central part of Grosse Ile and there exploded in a clump of woods, tearing century old oaks into splinters". A 2016 article in the Trenton Tribune would later falsely state that the explosion happened in 1907.

These baseless claims have been debunked by fact-checkers; court proceedings concerning the lawsuit (Henderson v. Sullivan) related to the explosion state that it took place in June 1906, from twenty tons of dynamite, on a single island (Powder House Island). These details were not disputed by the plaintiff, defendant, or judiciary.

=== Second injunction ===
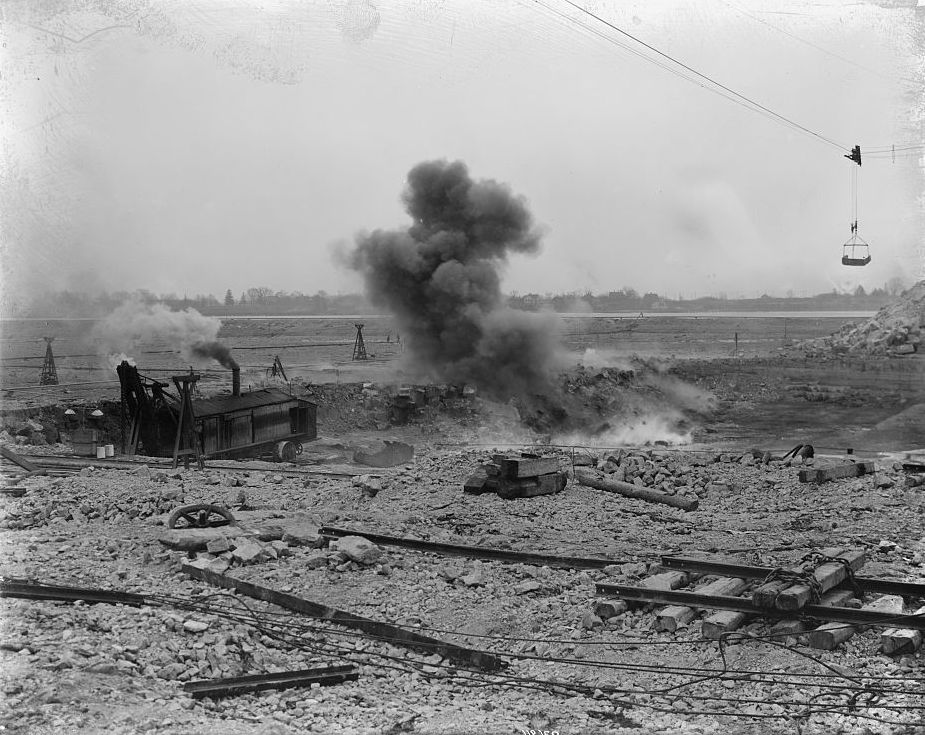
An 800 lb (360 kg) charge of dynamite being used for construction on the Livingstone Channel, in a photo taken between 1905 and 1920

Several days after the explosion, construction began to rebuild the storage sheds. However, attorney Edwin Henderson filed a petition claiming that his house on Grosse Ile had been damaged by the explosion; on July 6, a temporary injunction was issued against the Dunbar & Sullivan Company preventing them from storing explosives on the island. Henderson requested that the court permanently enjoin Dunbar & Sullivan from storing any dynamite in the Detroit River, which was denied by the judge. Henderson appealed the case to the United States Court of Appeals in Cincinnati, which reversed the prior ruling and granted an injunction (albeit with limitations) in February 1908, with Judge John K. Richards giving the opinion:

We think it apparent from the record that a reasonable amount of dynamite, for use in the public work, might be stored on Powder House Island without injuring persons and property in the neighborhood, and to the great interest of the public in the doing of the improvement of the Detroit River now going on, and so we think that, under proper limitations, an injunction ought to be granted; the judgement of the court below is therefore reversed and the case remanded, with instructions to grant an injunction restraining the defendant from storing dynamite on the island or place described in the bill as the place where the defendant had recently been storing it, in such quantity as to create danger to the complainant or his family personally, or danger to the property, real or personal, owned by or possessed by him, at the place described in the bill as his residence on Grosse Ile.

By 1908, reports indicated that the explosives used for channel blasting were being stored in a bulletproof concrete structure. However, public opinion on the issue was divided, with some residents of nearby islands "apprehensive" about the storage of dynamite along the lower Detroit River. On March 5, 1908, C. McD. Townsend, United States district engineer, held a hearing on the issue. At the hearing, the residents of Grosse Ile and Hickory Island were represented by Dr. David Inglis, who expressed concern about the storage of explosives, and proposed that the matter be settled in federal court. Townsend's proposal for a compromise entailed constructing three additional islands, between which a total of 60 short tons (54,000 kg) of dynamite would be divided evenly. However, no such islands were constructed, and none appear on survey maps from 1906 through 2019.

By March 1910, the dynamite factory on Powder House Island had returned to operation, with an output of 2 short tons (1,800 kg) per day. In July of that year, several hundred passengers of the pleasure boat Wauketa were "given nearly a three hours extension of their outing" when it ran aground on the shore of a Dunbar Island:

The passengers, none of whom seemed to take the occurrence very seriously, enjoyed themselves in the cool breezes counting the stars and speculating on what would happen if the dynamite magazine of Dunbar & Sullivan on the island nearby should chance to blow up.

In January 1912, a contract was carried out to fill its ice houses, and in May of that year, a "full force of men" was working at the factory under an O. B. Barnes.

=== Deepening of channel and subsequent use of island ===
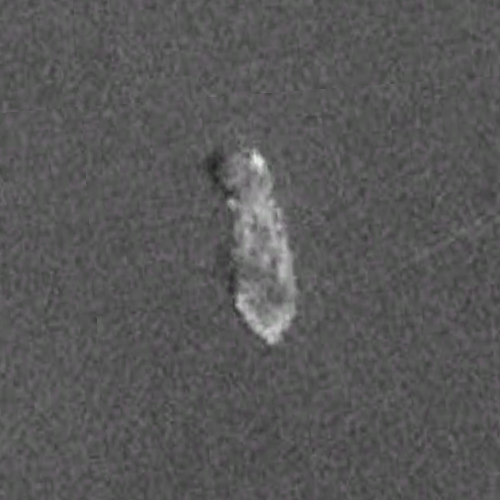
1993 aerial photo, taken by USGS

Dunbar & Sullivan's operations on the Livingstone Channel soon ended. The channel was completed, and opened to the public, in October 1912. While the ice house and dynamite factory would again burn "to the water's edge" in 1919, the company continued to carry out dredging and excavation around the Detroit River for decades afterward. In the 1920s, it was using nearby Stony Island as a central part of its dredging and excavation operations, and by 1931 work was still going on there "24 hours a day".

In December 1932, channel-deepening operations began again, this time being carried out by a George Mills Company of Ontario. The company continued to use Powder House Island as a storage location for explosives; in that year they constructed a new powder house on the island. By that time, dynamite had been replaced with blasting gelatin. The Windsor Star reported in March 1933 that "in spite of the safety of modern blasting gelatine, the Mills Company takes excellent care that not too much of it is on the job at one time", with a reserve stock of approximately 2,000 50 lb (23 kg) cases being kept on the island. By April 1935, the company was preparing to begin draining the third (and final) section of the channel. In December, the company completed the contract, and laid off "all of its 240 employees [...] with the exception of 20 men, who [were] packing the company's equipment for shipment to the next job". Further work on the channel was contracted to an Arundell Corporation, who hoped to complete remaining work by December. Several months later, all work on the project was completed; it was opened for ship traffic on September 5, 1936.

In 1936, the George Mills Company and the Arundel Corporation were the subject of another lawsuit, in which Amherstburg residents sought monetary compensation for "damage and loss to [...] property as a result of the blasting operations on the channel project". The case was settled out of court in September of that year. Another suit with similar complaints was filed against the Arundel Corporation in 1938.

Work on nearby shipping channels would continue through the mid-20th century, including a project to deepen the Amherstburg Channel in the late 1950s that was mostly completed by 1961. Powder House Island is shown largely unchanged on survey maps throughout this time. It was included in a 1961 proposal by the United States Army Corps of Engineers to draw harbor lines around several islands in the lower Detroit River, enlarging the islands up to the boundaries of shipping channels. This proposal, however, prompted a "vigorous protest" by the Michigan Attorney General, who said "the establishment of a harbor line would undoubtedly result in the making of fills which would constitute an obstruction to the navigable waters of the State without the sanction of the Legislature or any public officials of the State". Ultimately, no such filling projects were carried out, and the island stayed the same size.

By the 1980s, industrial activity on Powder House Island had ceased, and in 1984 it was uninhabited. As of 2015, Powder House Island (as well as the nearby Stony Island, also formerly used by Dunbar & Sullivan) was owned by the Michigan Department of Natural Resources, managed by its Wildlife Division as part of the Pointe Mouillee State Game Area, and accessible to the public for hunting and camping. The area surrounding the island is known for good perch fishing; a 1982 report by the U.S. Fish and Wildlife Service said that walleye spawned near the island.
