= Stony Island (Michigan) =

Island in the Detroit River, Michigan

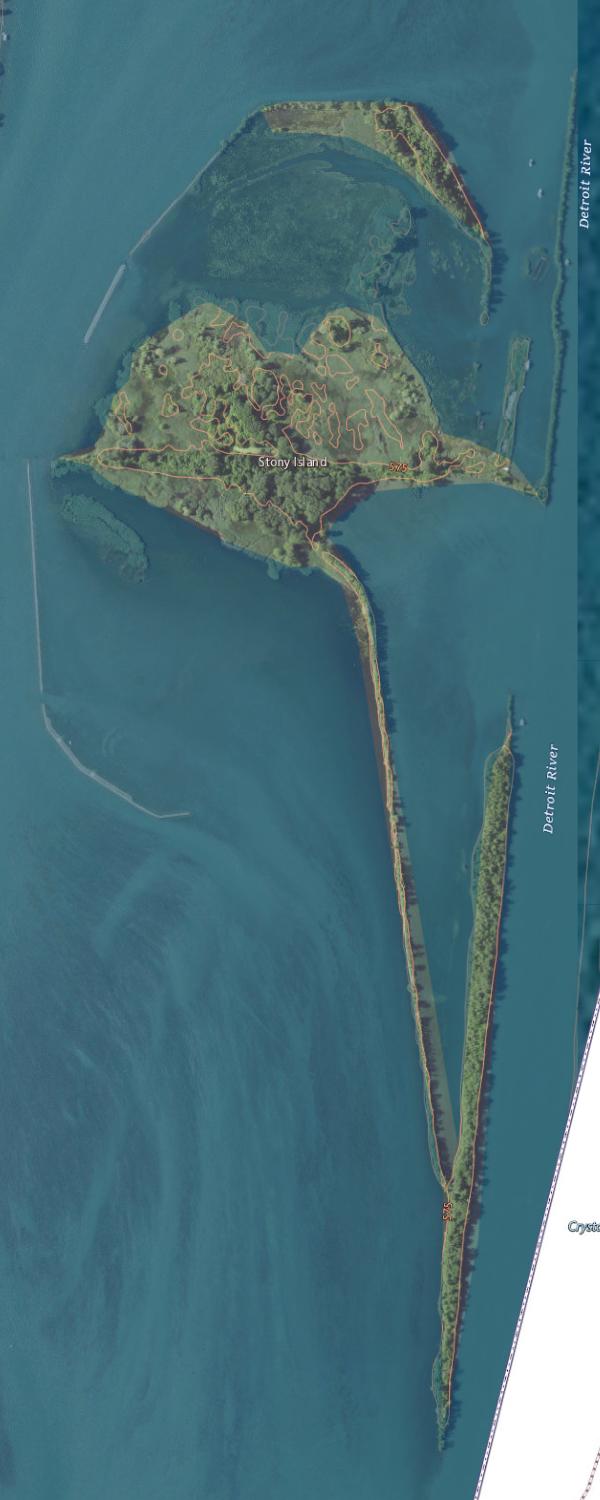
- USGS aerial imagery of Stony Island

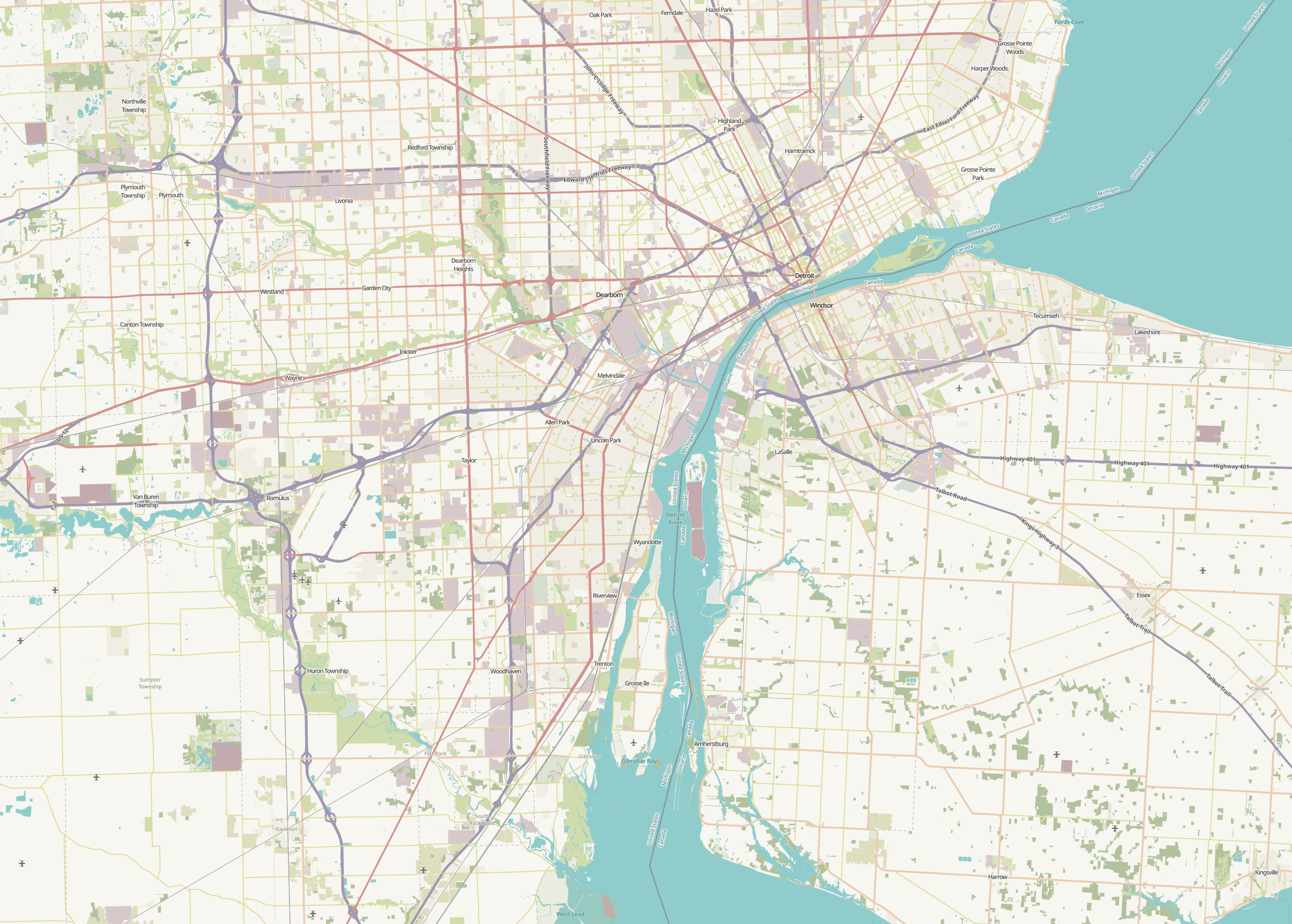
- Location within Wayne County, Michigan Location within Michigan Location within the United States

Geography
- Location: Michigan
- Coordinates: 42°07′33″N 83°07′56″W
- Area: 100 to 240 acres (40 to 97 ha)
- Highest elevation: 577 ft (175.9 m)

Administration
- United States
- State: Michigan
- County: Wayne

Stony Island is an island in the Detroit River, in southeast Michigan. It has been used for hunting and fishing as long as humans have inhabited the region; from the mid-19th century to the mid-20th century, it was the site of a small settlement and served as a central location for the construction of the Livingstone Channel, as well as various civil engineering projects involving the Detroit River. By the 1990s, it had become completely uninhabited; it is now open to the public and administered by the Michigan Department of Natural Resources.

== Geography ==
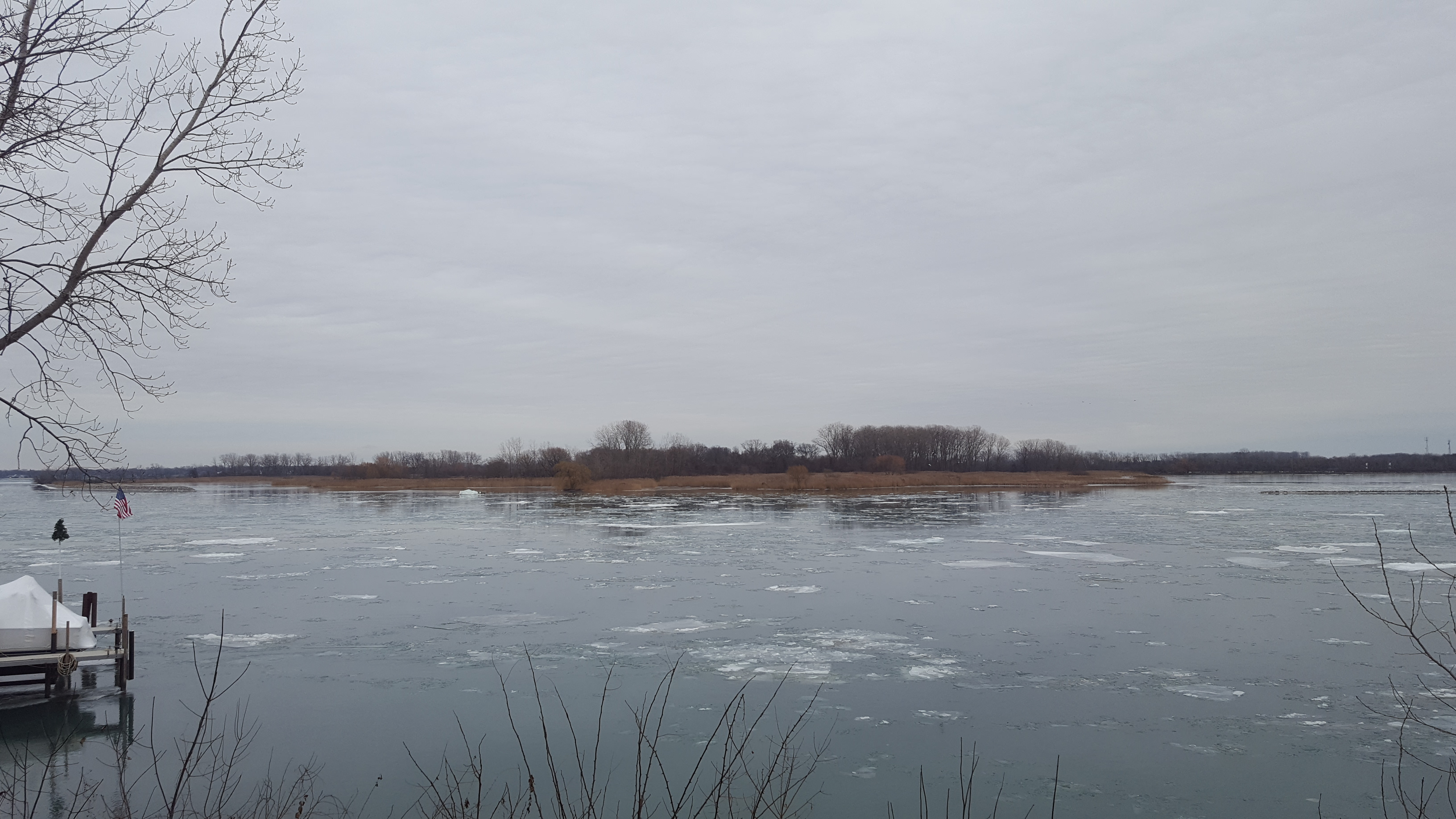
View of Stony Island from Grosse Ile in 2017

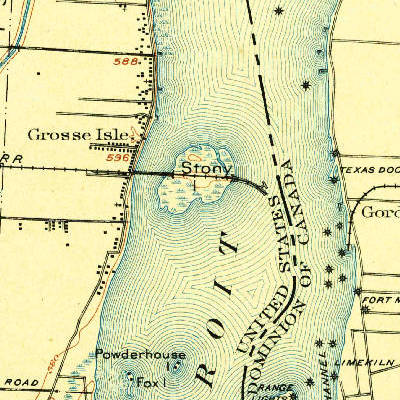
Stony Island in a 1906 USGS map. The railroad is still present, but stone pilings have not yet been constructed.

Stony Island's coordinates are 42°07′33″N 83°07′56″W and it is contained within Grosse Ile Township, in Wayne County. In the Detroit River, it is downstream of Lake St. Clair and upstream of Lake Erie. Immediately to its west is the much-larger Grosse Ile, which is approximately 1,000 ft (300 m) away; it was once connected to Grosse Ile by a railroad bridge, which was demolished by 1912. Past Grosse Ile is Trenton, Michigan. To its east is the Livingstone Channel, approximately 500 ft (150 m) wide, across which lies Crystal Island. To the east of Crystal Island, across the Amherstburg Channel, is Amherstburg, Ontario. Bois Blanc Island is to the southeast; Powder House Island, Fox Island, Elba Island, and Sugar Island are to the southwest.

Stony Island consists of a round, naturally-formed central hub, from which radiate numerous limestone pilings. These pilings were placed to form the edge of the Livingstone Channel, through which ships pass going south.

The United States Geological Survey (USGS) gave Stony Island's elevation as 577 ft (176 m) in 1980, and it has an area of approximately 100 acres (40 ha).

== History ==
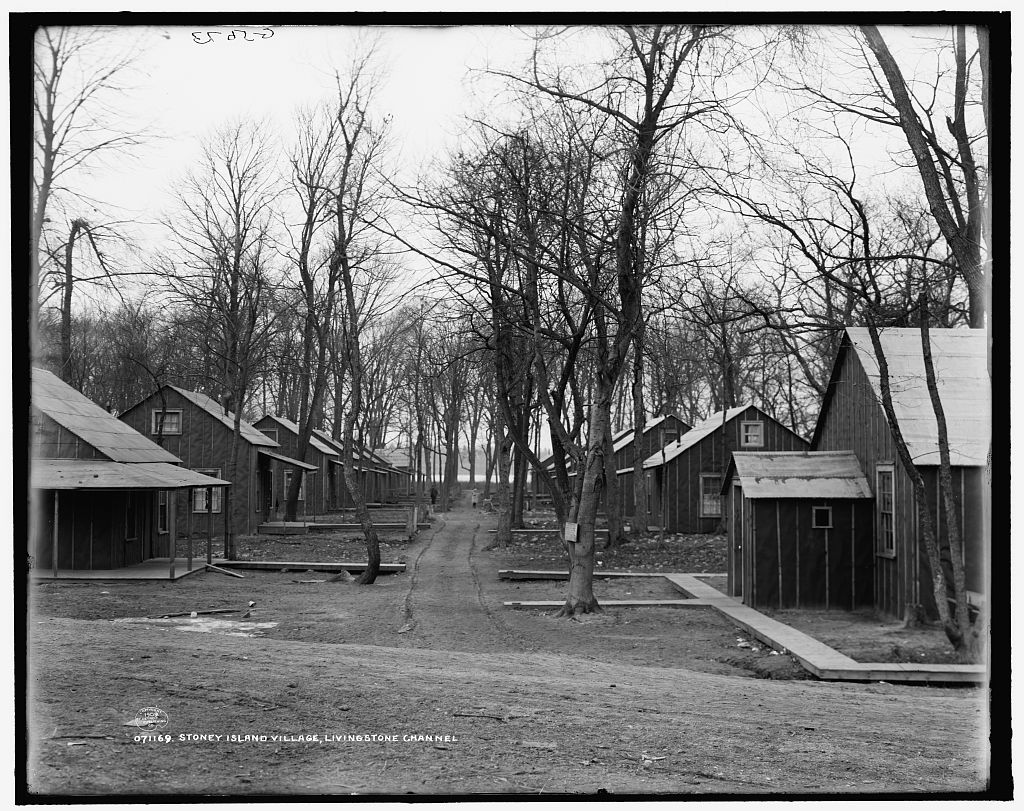
Houses on Stony Island in 1908

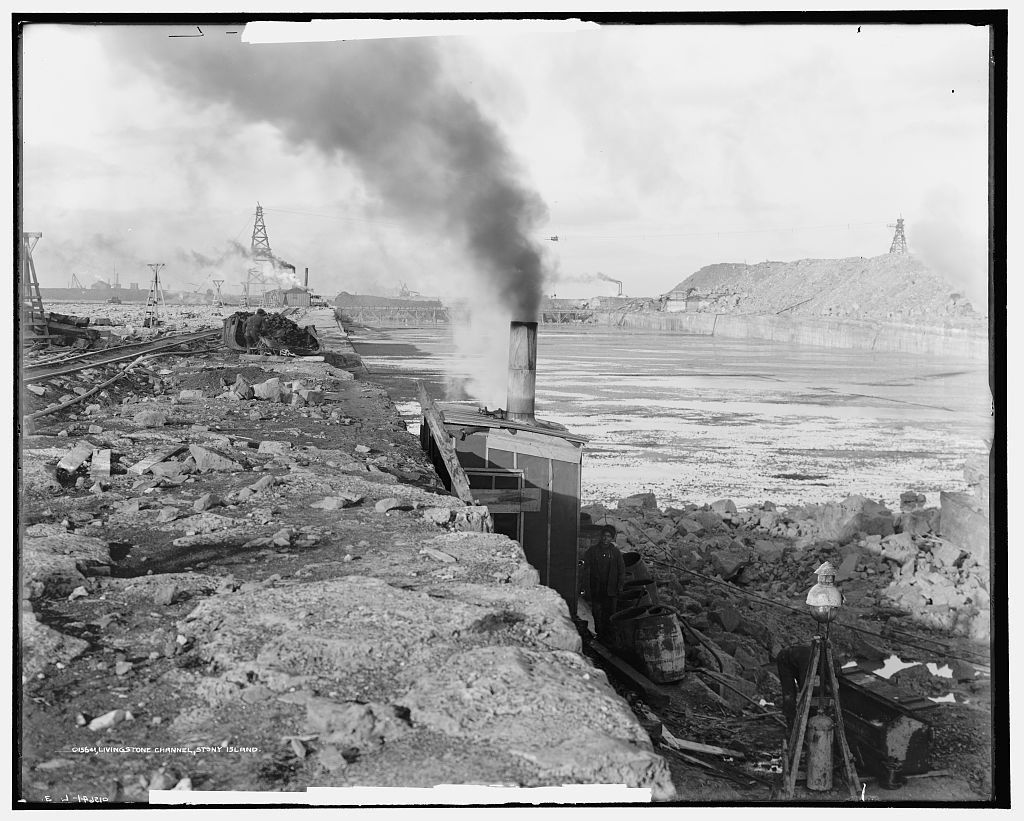
Construction of the Livingstone Channel at Stony Island in the early 20th century

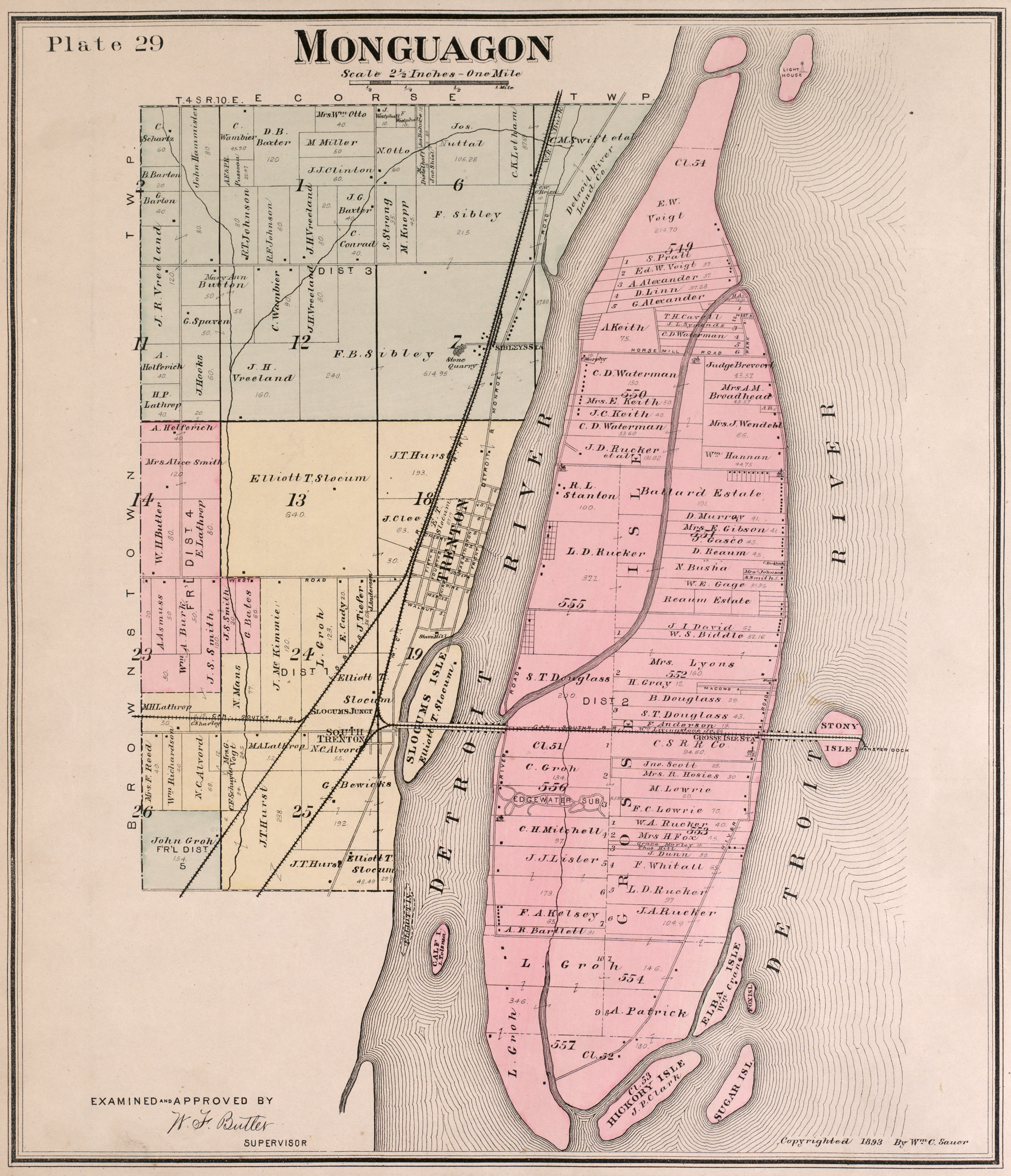
An 1893 map featuring Stony Island

Stony Island was originally inhabited by the Potawatomi, Native Americans who hunted and fished there; in 1781, it was deeded to the Macomb family of Grosse Ile. It is shown, as "Stone Island", in an 1818 United States government survey by Joseph Fletcher and Edward Tiffin. It also appears on an 1855 map of the area, to the east of plots on Grosse Ile owned by John William and David Macomb.

In the late 19th century, railroad tracks were constructed, connecting it to Grosse Ile as part of the Canada Southern Railroad's ferry crossing between the United States and Canada. This was meant to enable rail transport from the East Coast, through Ontario to the Midwest (with a ferry link from Amherstburg to Stony Island). This was completed by 1873. However, Canadian Southern experienced financial issues, and was purchased by Michigan Central in 1880, who ran ferries to Amherstburg directly from Detroit and "saw little need for" the line to Stony Island. Regular service was ended in 1883, and the line was shut down completely by 1888. By 1907, the bridge had been abandoned for "many years"; a public hearing was set for September 7 to address the issue of removing it as an "obstruction to navigation", and it had been removed by 1912.

In the 1900s, the project to dredge and expand the Livingstone Channel for ship traffic began; Stony Island "grew into prominence almost in a night". Stony Island was "the base from which one of the most daring feats in engineering annals – the construction in midriver of a cofferdam a mile long and a sixth of a mile wide – was conducted". At the time, the cofferdam was "the largest ever constructed". By the 1920s, Dunbar & Sullivan was using the island as a central part of its dredging and excavation operations. Work was still going on "24 hours a day" by 1931.

In later years, industrial activity died down, and residents left the island; the houses were demolished, but several abandoned structures were remaining in 1998. By the late 20th century, a single caretaker was its only inhabitant; Jack Mather, a retired sailor employed by Dunbar & Sullivan, lived in a two-room shack on a barge with his two dogs (Sweetheart and Bruiser). He lived on the island from 1977 until the company ceased operations in 1987.

In 1994, the Grosse Ile Nature and Land Conservancy began to pursue the island's acquisition. The island was eventually purchased by the State of Michigan in 1997, through the Michigan Natural Resources Trust Fund, for $750,000 (equivalent to $1.63 million in 2025). While the island is currently a part of Grosse Ile Township, it has no residents, and no utility companies provide service to it. As of 2015, Stony Island (as well as the nearby Celeron Island) was owned by the State of Michigan, and managed by the Michigan Department of Natural Resources' Wildlife Division. Most of Stony Island is part of the Pointe Mouillee State Game Area, and accessible to the public for hunting and camping, except for a small portion of north–south pilings on the northeast corner.

== Ecology ==
The Great Lakes Institute for Environmental Research described the Stony Island area as "a mix of upland, wetland, and swift-moving, shallow water", and said it was "one of the largest remaining wildlife habitat and fish spawning areas in the lower Detroit River". The "upland" area, consisting of approximately 50 acres (20 ha), contains various old-growth vegetation (including chinkapin oak, hackberry and cottonwood). Its waters are partially shielded by a limestone barrier, creating a shallow "bay" that more than 23 species of waterfowl have been found to use as a staging area during migration. Numerous types of fish spawn at the island; a 1982 report by the U.S. Fish and Wildlife Service listed:

- lake sturgeon (Acipenser fulvescens),
- lake whitefish (Coregonus clupeaformis),
- rainbow smelt (Osmerus mordax),
- northern pike (Esox lucius),
- muskellunge (Esox masquinongy),
- carp (Cyprinus carpio),
- minnow (Minnow spp.),
- channel catfish (Ictalurus punctatus),
- bullhead (Ameiurus spp.),
- white bass (Morone chrysops),
- smallmouth bass (Micropterus dolomieui),
- yellow perch (Perca flavescens),
- walleye (Stizostedion vitreum vitreum),
- freshwater drum (Aplodinotus grunniens).

Fishing at Stony Island "tends to focus on white bass, northern pike, and other species".
