= Cofferdam =

Barrier allowing liquid to be pumped out of an enclosed area

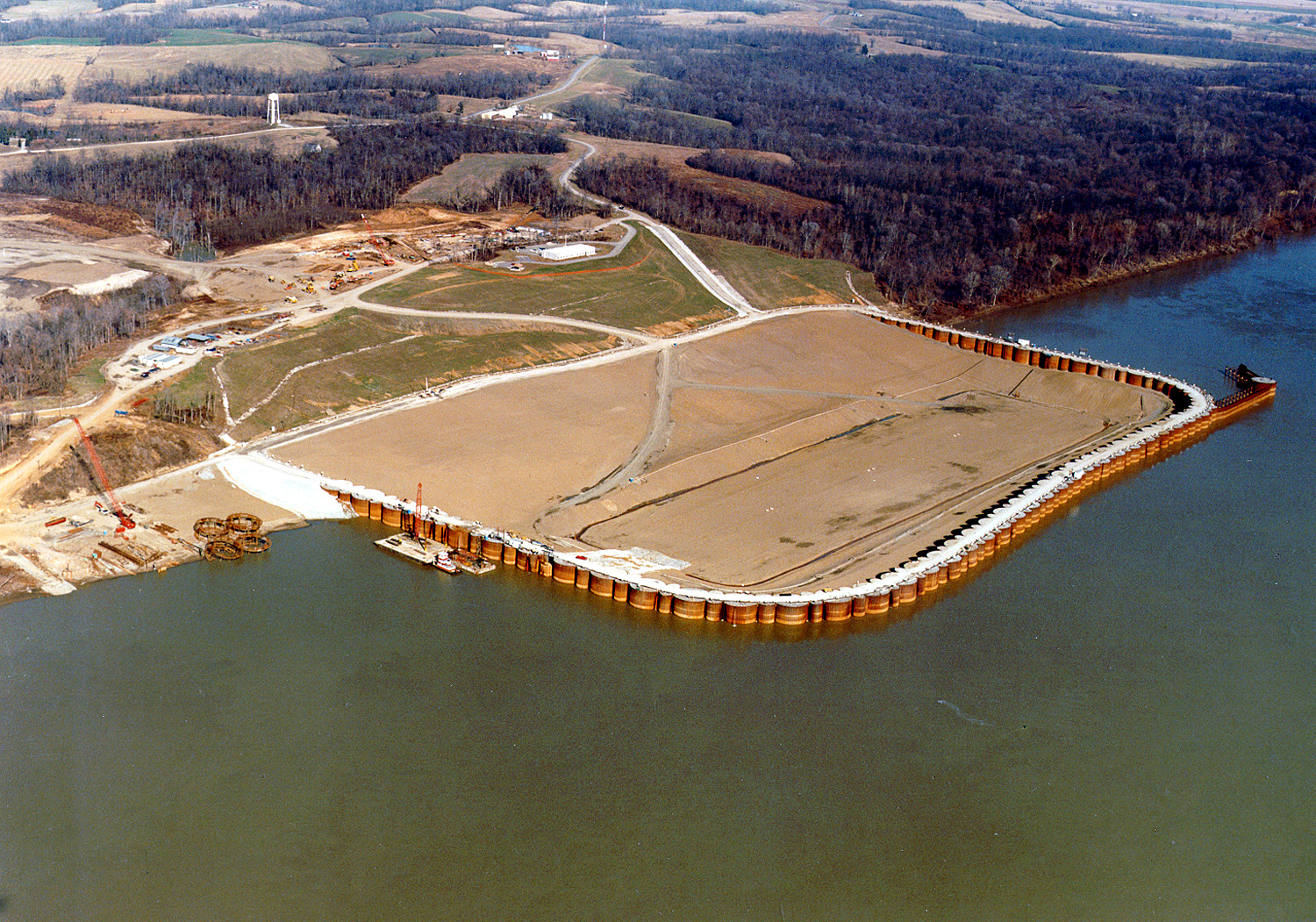
A cofferdam on the Ohio River near Olmsted, Illinois, built for the purpose of constructing the Olmsted Lock and Dam

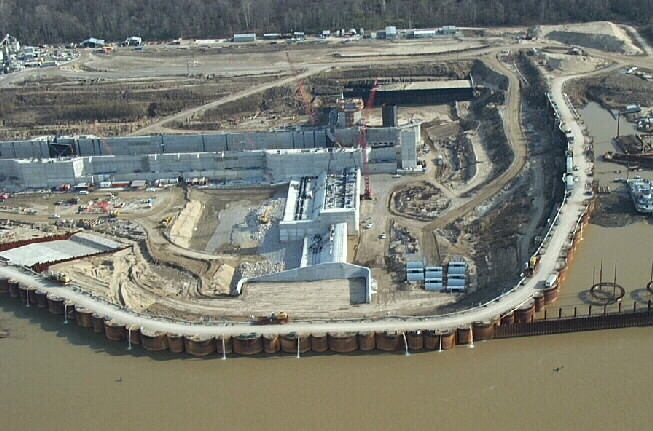
A cofferdam during the construction of locks at the Montgomery Point Lock and Dam

A cofferdam is an enclosure built within a body of water to allow the enclosed area to be pumped out or drained. This pumping creates a dry working environment so that the work can be carried out safely. Cofferdams are commonly used for construction or repair of permanent dams, oil platforms, bridge piers, etc., built within water.

These cofferdams are usually welded steel structures, with components consisting of sheet piles, wales, and cross braces. Such structures are usually dismantled after the construction work is completed.

The origin of the word comes from coffer (originally from Latin cophinus meaning 'basket') and dam from Proto-Germanic *dammaz meaning 'barrier across a stream of water to obstruct its flow and raise its level').

The term is also used in naval architecture, to refer to a space between two watertight bulkheads or decks within a ship.

== Uses ==
For dam construction, two cofferdams are usually built, one upstream and one downstream of the proposed dam, after an alternative diversion tunnel or channel has been provided for the river flow to bypass the foundation area of the dam. These cofferdams are typically a conventional embankment dam of both earth- and rock-fill, but concrete or some sheet piling also may be used. Usually, upon completion of the dam and associated structures, the downstream coffer is removed, and the upstream coffer is flooded as the diversion is closed and the reservoir begins to fill. Depending on the geography of a dam site, in some applications, a U-shaped cofferdam is used in the construction of one half of a dam. When complete, the cofferdam is removed and a similar one is created on the opposite side of the river for the construction of the dam's other half.

Cofferdams are used in ship husbandry to allow dry access to underwater equipment and to close underwater openings while work is done on the fittings inside the ship. This is more common in naval vessels where a cofferdam may fit several vessels of a class.

The cofferdam is also used on occasion in the shipbuilding and ship repair industry, when it is not practical to put a ship in drydock for repair work or modernization. An example of such an application is the lengthening of ships. In some cases, a ship is actually cut in two while still in the water, and a new section of ship is floated in to lengthen the ship. The cutting of the hull is done inside a cofferdam attached directly to the hull of the ship; the cofferdam is then detached before the hull sections are floated apart. The cofferdam is later replaced while the hull sections are welded together again. As expensive as this may be to accomplish, the use of a drydock might be even more expensive.

Cofferdams are also used in some marine salvage operations, it functions as a watertight enclosure bolted to a submerged vessel's hull or hatches, extending the sides above the waterline to allow for dewatering and the restoration of buoyancy. Cofferdams have been used to recover aircraft from water as well, as in the case of Avro Lancaster ED603, which was recovered from the IJsselmeer in 2023 using a cofferdam, allowing for close examination of the wreckage, as well as to locate and repatriate the remains of its crew.

=== Examples ===
A 100-ton open caisson that was lowered more than a mile to the sea floor in attempts to stop the flow of oil in the Deepwater Horizon oil spill has been called a cofferdam.

A cofferdam over 1 mile long was built to permit the construction of the Livingstone Channel in the Detroit River. See main article at Stony Island.

The museum battleships USS Alabama (BB-60) and USS North Carolina (BB-55) have had cofferdams since 2003 and 2018, respectively. This saves much money compared to towing and dry docking them after the tow and this also provides additional security so there is a low chance of the ships sinking and becoming impossible to repair.

== Types ==
Several types of structure performing this function can be distinguished, depending on how they are constructed and how they are used.

=== Civil and coastal engineering ===
In civil and coastal engineering applications, cofferdams are usually made from interlocking steel sheet piles. These piles are driven deep into the bed of the water source, creating a temporary dam behind which the engineering contractors can carry out their works. After the construction project is complete, the sheet piles can then be removed and the area behind them rewetted.

=== Naval architecture ===
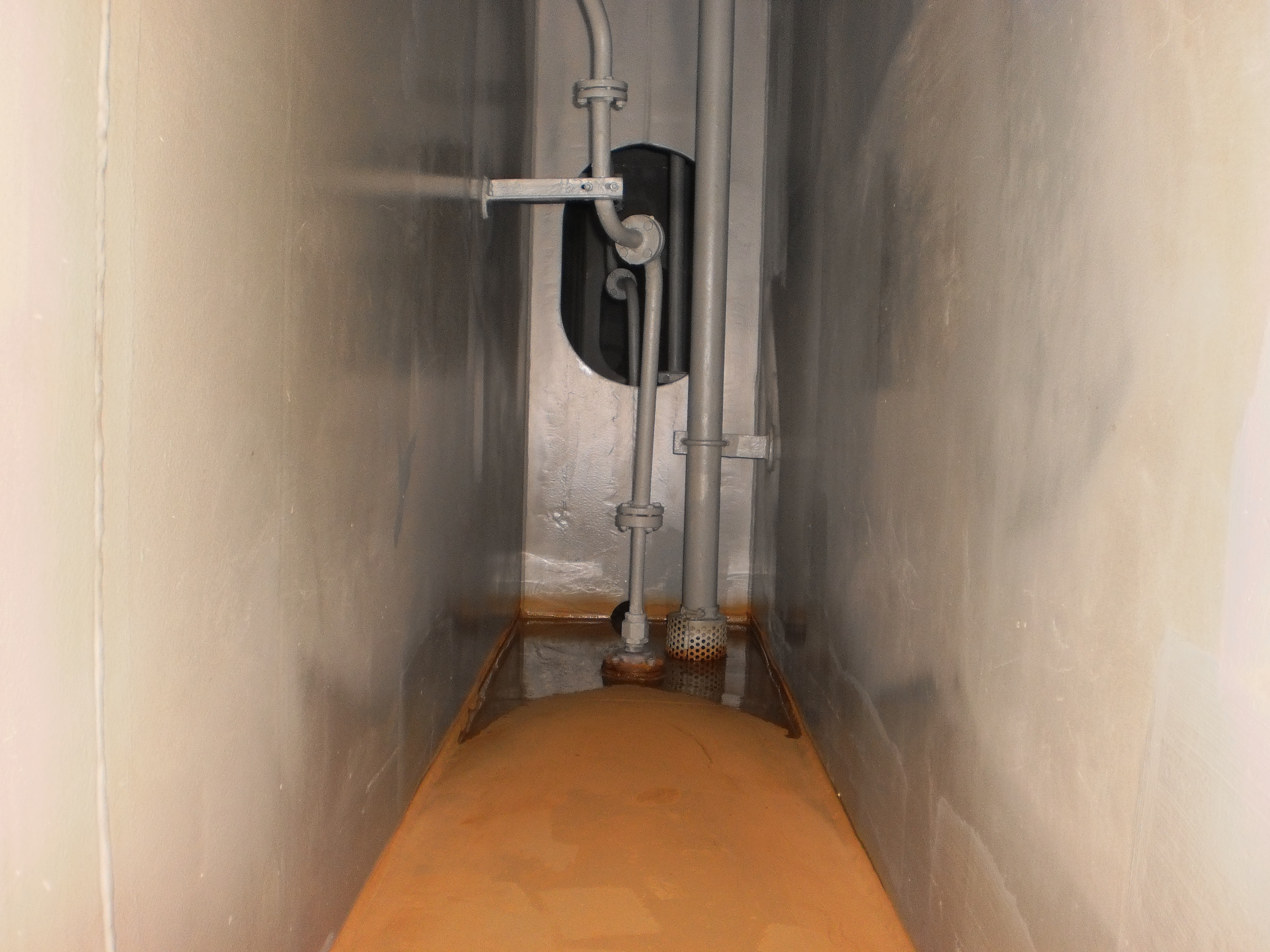
Inside of a cofferdam on a vessel

A cofferdam is a space between two watertight bulkheads or decks within a ship. It is usually a void (empty) space intended to ensure that the contents of nearly adjacent tanks cannot leak directly from one to the other which would result in contamination of the contents of one or both of the compartments. The cofferdam would be kept empty at all times and the ship may have sensors within it to warn if it has begun to fill with liquid. If two different cargoes that react dangerously with each other are carried on the same vessel, one or more cofferdams are usually required between the cargo spaces.

=== Marine salvage ===
When all or part of the main deck of a sunken ship is submerged, flooded spaces cannot be dewatered until all openings are sealed or the effective freeboard is extended above the high-water level. One method of doing this is to build a temporary watertight extension of the entire hull of the ship, or the space to be dewatered, to the surface. This watertight extension is a cofferdam. Although they are temporary structures, cofferdams for this purpose have to be strongly built, adequately stiffened, and reinforced to withstand the hydrostatic and other loads that they will have to withstand. Large cofferdams are normally restricted to harbor operations.

Complete cofferdams cover most or all of the sunken vessel and are equivalent to extensions of the ship's sides to above the water surface.

Partial cofferdams are constructed around moderate-sized openings or areas such as a cargo hatch or small deckhouse. They can often be prefabricated and installed as a unit, or prefabricated panels can be joined during erection. When partial cofferdams are used, it may be necessary to compensate for hydrostatic pressure on the deck by shoring the decks. With both complete and partial cofferdams, there is usually a large free surface in the spaces being pumped. Sometimes this can be limited by dewatering one compartment at a time, or in groups, taking into account the beam strength loads on the ship induced by the load distribution.

Small cofferdams are used for pumping or to allow salvors access to spaces that are covered by water at some stage of the tide. They are usually prefabricated and fitted around minor openings.

Diving work on cofferdams often involves clearing obstructions, fitting, and fastening, including underwater welding, and where necessary, caulking, bracing and shoring the adjacent structure.

=== Ship husbandry ===
There are two common types of dry chambers used in underwater ship husbandry. Open bottom cofferdams allow divers direct access to the enclosed hull area, system, or opening. The flange sides of the chamber secure and seal against the hull, acting as an airtight boundary. Open bottom cofferdams are typically used as diver workspace for rigging or welding and ventilation for welding or epoxy cure, where there is no opening to the interior of the vessel, or the interior is pressurized in this area. The air space is at the pressure of the water surface at the bottom of the chamber. Open top cofferdams allow surface access to the work area below the waterline, and are at atmospheric pressure. Openings through the hull to the interior of the ship are possible.

=== Portable cofferdams ===
Portable cofferdams can be inflatable or frame and fabric cofferdams that can be reused. Inflatable cofferdams are stretched across the site, then inflated with water from the prospected dry area. Frame and fabric cofferdams are erected in the water and covered with watertight fabric. Once the area is dry, water still remaining from the dry area can be siphoned over to the wet area.

== See also ==
- Caisson (engineering)
- Causeway
