= East River Road–North Hickory Canal Bridge =

- East River Road – North Hickory Canal Bridge
- U.S. National Register of Historic Places
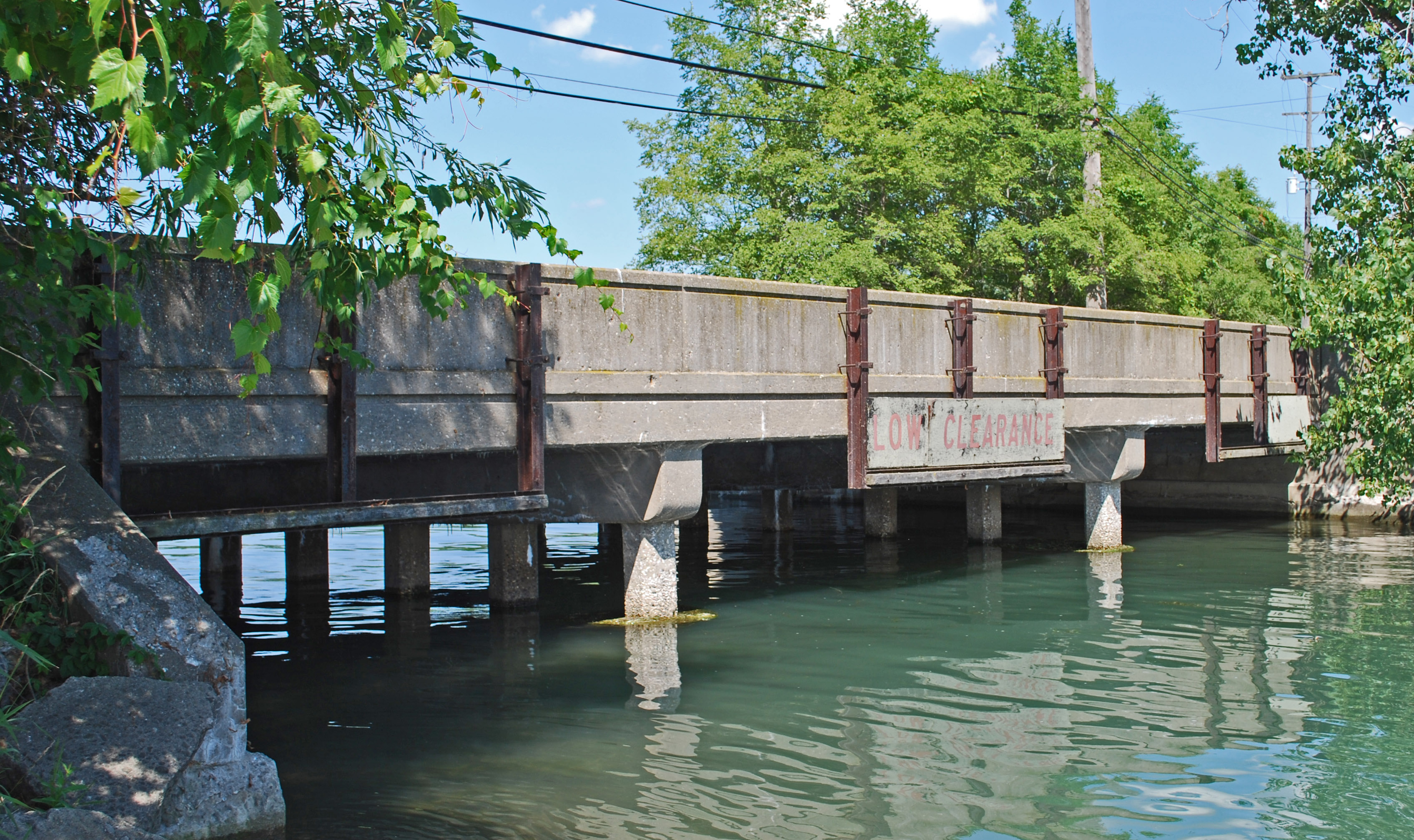
- Arch of bridge

- Location within Michigan Location within the United States
- Interactive map
- Location: E. River Road over N. Hickory Canal, Grosse Ile, Michigan
- Coordinates: 42°5′46″N 83°9′2″W
- Area: 0.9 acres (0.36 ha)
- Built: 1945
- Architect: Wayne County Road Commission
- Architectural style: concrete slab bridge
- MPS: Highway Bridges of Michigan MPS
- NRHP reference No.: 00000042
- Added to NRHP: February 4, 2000

The East River Road–North Hickory Canal Bridge is a bridge located on East River Road over the North Hickory Canal, connecting Grosse Ile, Michigan with Hickory Island to the south. It was listed on the National Register of Historic Places in 2000.

== History ==
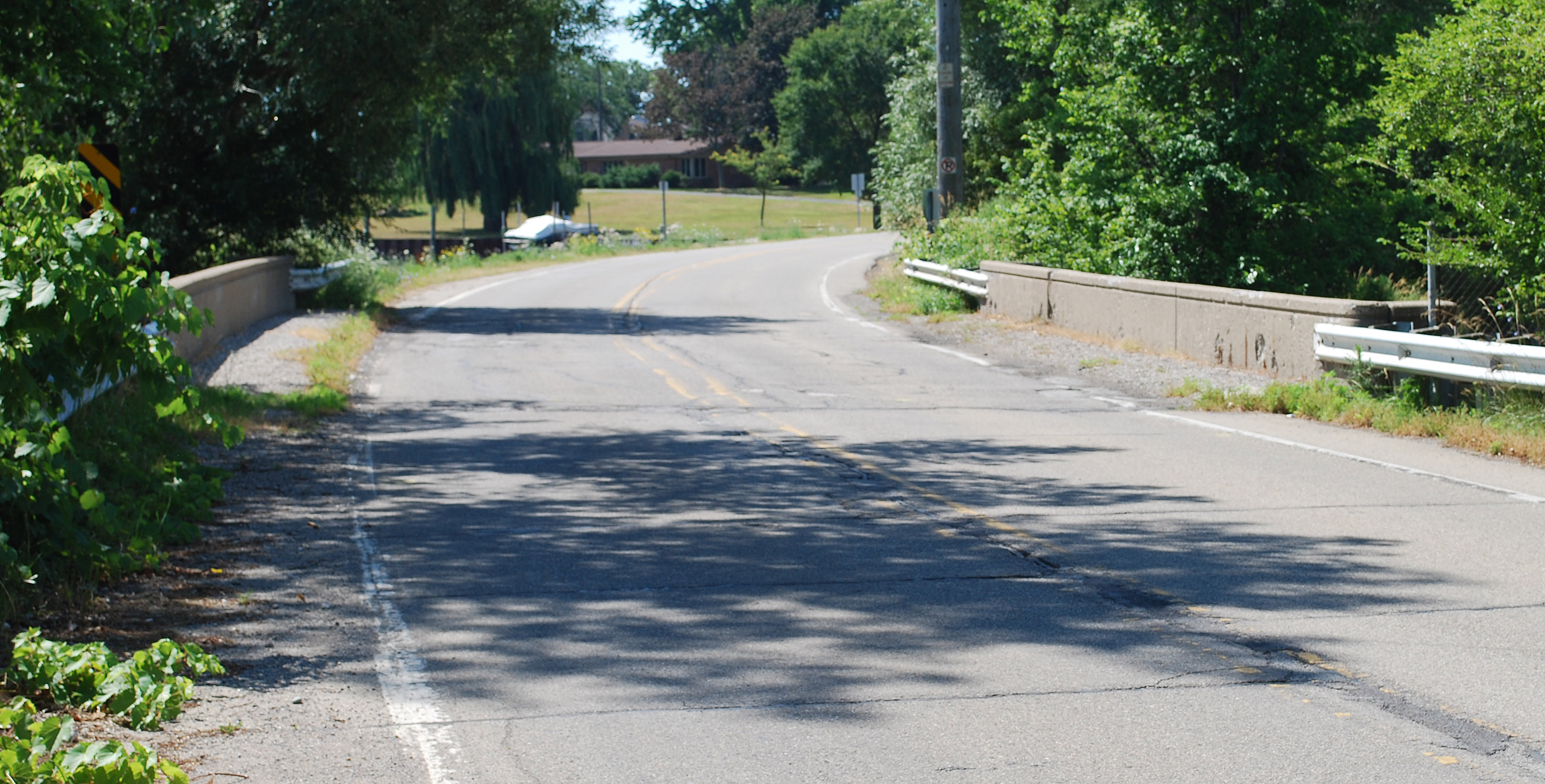
Deck of bridge

In the early part of the 20th century, the East River Road bridge over the North Hickory Canal was a timber structure. In 1944, the Wayne County Road Commission formulated plans to widen and straighten the southern section of road, moving it to the west. The original bridge was replaced with this structure, completed in 1945.

== Description ==
The East River Road–North Hickory Canal Bridge is 64 feet (20 m) long with a main span length of 24 feet (7.3 m). The bridge is continuous concrete slab bridge. Wayne County used this type of bridge in the years during and after World War II, presumably because of the difficulty of obtaining steel during these years. The bridge has solid concrete parapet railings embedded with a pebble aggregate and trimmed with a horizontal line. The ends of the railings curve to follow the perpendicular wing walls. The piles of the bridge are octagonal, part of the road commission's continuous experimentation with bridge design.
