= Hickory Island =

Island in Michigan

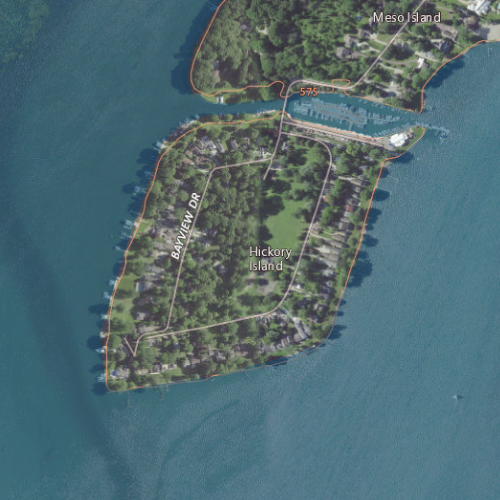
- USGS aerial imagery of Hickory Island

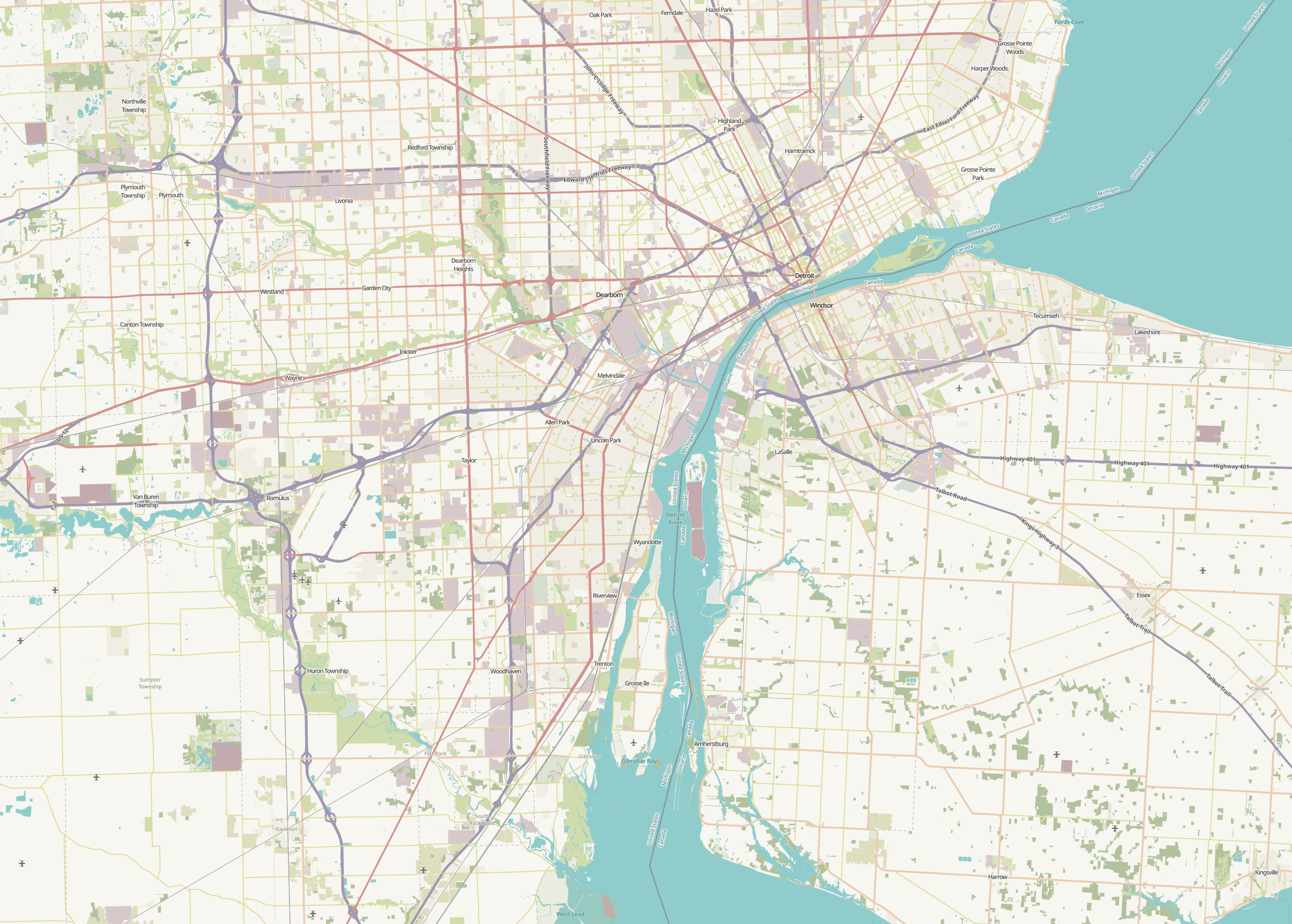
- Location within Wayne County, Michigan Location within Michigan Location within the United States

Geography
- Location: Michigan
- Coordinates: 42°05′15″N 83°09′20″W
- Highest elevation: 581 ft (177.1 m)

Administration
- United States
- State: Michigan
- County: Wayne

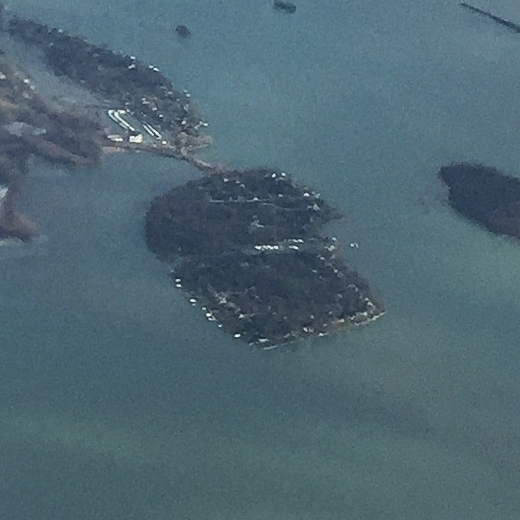
Hickory Island and Meso Island viewed from the south in a 2016 aerial photo

Hickory Island is an inhabited island in the Detroit River. It is in Wayne County, in southeast Michigan. Its coordinates are 42°05′15″N 83°09′20″W, and the United States Geological Survey gave its elevation as 581 ft (177 m) in 1980.

Hickory Island is one of fifteen islands that comprise Grosse Ile. While some are uninhabited, Hickory Island has been developed into residential subdivisions containing "moderately sized homes on smaller lots".

Hickory Island is connected on the north to Meso Island (sometimes called "Upper Hickory"), and from there to Grosse Ile, by the East River Road Bridge. This bridge was described as being "in serious condition" by the Detroit Free Press in January 2020; the Michigan Department of Transportation had posted a speed limit of 5 miles per hour (8.0 km/h) on the bridge in November 2019 due to the structure's deterioration. The Hickory Island Park and Yacht Club, located in the center of the island, offers recreational facilities for its residents.

In January 2021, a large metal monolith, measuring approximately 8 ft (2.4 m) by 11.5 ft (3.5 m), was found to have been placed on Hickory Island anonymously and without explanation. This was one of many such cases around the world which occurred after widespread media coverage of the Utah monolith in November 2020.
