= Pointe Mouillee State Game Area =

Protected area in Michigan, U.S.

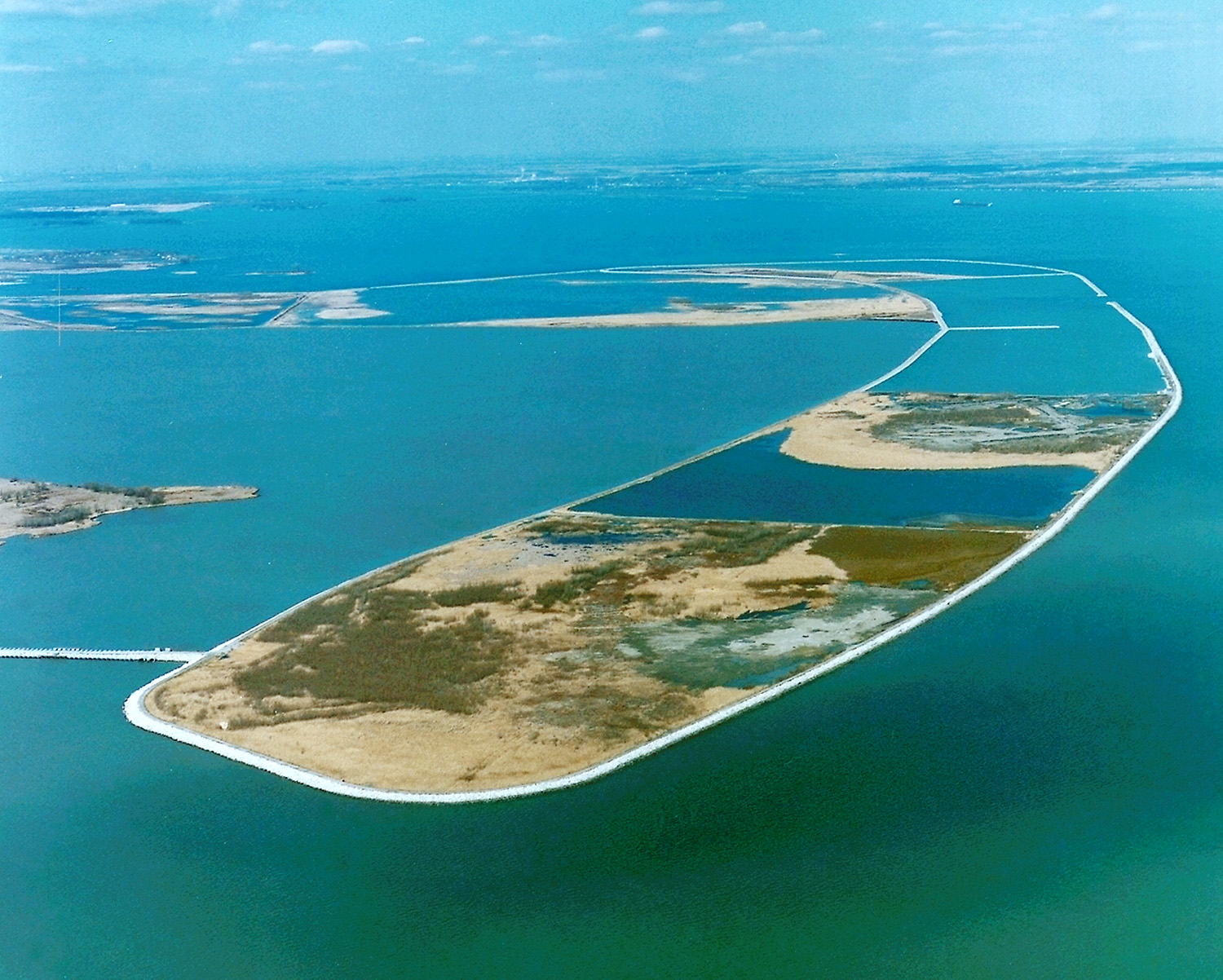
- Aerial view of the artificial barrier island

- Location within Michigan Location within the United States
- Location: Monroe and Wayne counties Michigan
- Nearest city: Rockwood, Michigan
- Coordinates: 42°02′22″N 83°11′59″W
- Area: 7,483 acres (30.3 km^{2})
- Elevation: 571 feet (174 m)
- Established: 1945
- Governing body: Michigan Department of Natural Resources
- Website: Official website

Pointe Mouillee Marsh Informational Designation
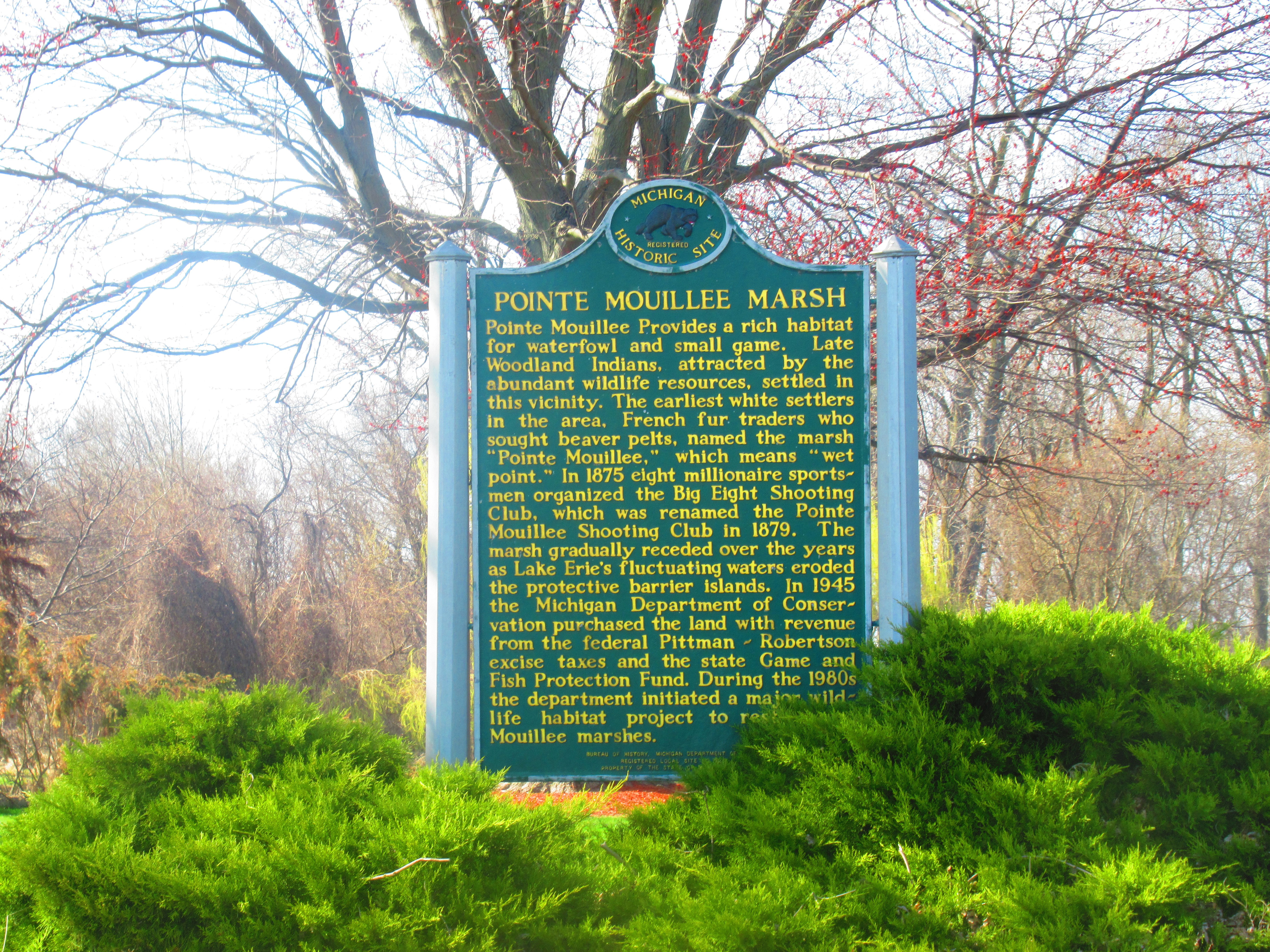
- Interactive map of Pointe Mouillee Marsh; Informational Designation
- 42°02′39″N 83°12′00″W
- Location: 37205 Pointe Mouillee Road; Brownstown Township, Michigan

Michigan State Historic Site
- Designated: February 15, 1990

Pointe Mouillee State Game Area (/ˈpɔɪnt mwiːˈjeɪ/; point mwee-YAY or moo-LAY) is a state game area in the U.S. state of Michigan. It encompasses 7,483 acres (30.3 km^{2}) of hunting, recreational, and protected wildlife and wetland areas at the mouth of the Huron River at Lake Erie, as well as smaller outlying areas within the Detroit River. Pointe Mouillee State Game Area was established in 1945 and is administered by the Michigan Department of Natural Resources.

== Location ==
Pointe Mouillee State Game Area is located in southeast Michigan around the mouth of the Huron River at Lake Erie. It sits at an elevation of 571 feet (174 m) above sea level. The game area is sometimes listed as occupying approximately 4,000 acres (16.2 km^{2}) to 5,195 acres (21.0 km^{2}). With additional expansions and the inclusion of outlying areas, the game area is currently listed at a total area of 7,483 acres (30.3 km^{2}).

It is divided between Monroe County to the south and Wayne County to the north. The Monroe County portion is within Berlin Charter Township, which contains most of the state game area. The northern portion is mostly within Brownstown Charter Township along the Huron River with a small marshy area to the north near Milleville Beach. Outlying areas to the north include two islands of the Detroit River: Celeron Island and Stony Island. Both of these uninhabited islands are within Grosse Ile Township.

Pointe Mouillee State Game Area is one of two state game and wildlife areas located within the mostly urbanized Wayne County, along with the much smaller Brownstown Prairie State Wildlife Area. Pointe Aux Peaux State Wildlife Area is the next nearest unit and is located to the south in Monroe County near the community of Stony Point. Pointe Mouillee State Game Area's headquarters are located within the boundaries at 37205 Mouillee Road. The headquarters also oversee several of the nearby state game and wildlife areas, including Erie State Game Area, Petersburg State Game Area, Pointe Aux Peaux State Wildlife Area, and Brownstown Prairie State Wildlife Area.

West Jefferson Avenue (named locally as the U.S. Turnpike south of the Huron River) forms a small portion of the western boundary of the state game area, while the rural Roberts Road forms most of the western boundary. The nearest cities are Rockwood to the west and Gibraltar to the north. The village of Estral Beach borders at the southwestern point. Lake Erie Metropark is located slightly north along West Jefferson Avenue. The Enrico Fermi Nuclear Generating Station is also visible to the south.

Other nearby notable sites include the Jefferson Avenue–Huron River and Harbin Drive–Silver Creek Canal Bridges and Hull's Trace North Huron River Corduroy Segment along West Jefferson Avenue, as well as the offshore Detroit River Light. All three of these sites are listed on the National Register of Historic Places.

== History ==
The area was first explored by French fur traders in the 17th century. The name Pointe Mouillee dates back to at least 1749 to refer to the area at the mouths of the Huron and Detroit rivers. "Mouillee" was an appropriate name for the area, as the word mouillée is the feminine form of mouillé, which means wet or moist. Pointe Mouillee is translated as "wet point."

In 1875, a group of wealthy local men bought about 2,000 acres (8.1 km^{2}) of land and established the Big 8 Shooting Club, which was considered one of the most prestigious hunting clubs in North America. In 1945, the hunting club and the land were purchased by the state of Michigan and converted into a public state game area.

Pointe Mouillee State Game Area has been expanded numerous times from its original size when it was established in 1945. With an area of approximately 130 acres (52.6 ha), Celeron Island in the Detroit River was added to the state game area in 1976. Stony Island, a natural island built up with large amounts of dredged material, was added at a later date. Portions of the state game area and surrounding waters have been listed as a potential expansion to the Detroit River International Wildlife Refuge.

=== Restoration ===
By the middle of the 20th century, increased damming of the Huron River and higher lake levels eroded away much of the marshlands. Beginning in 1970 with the help from the U.S. Army Corps of Engineers and many other conservation partners, contaminated material was dredged from the Detroit River and River Rouge and dumped at the mouth of the Huron River. The project aimed to create an elongated and narrow barrier island (or dike) to control water levels within the marshlands and provide protection from erosion.

The barrier island was constructed using 18 million cubic yards (13.7 million cubic meters) of material, some of which was identified as contaminated by the Environmental Protection Agency. The barrier island was created on a previous location where a natural beach had eroded away and exposed much of the marshlands. Stone mound seawalls were constructed along the perimeter of the island to protect it from future erosion. The first phase of the project cost $14.5 million and ran from April 1976 to September 1978. The second phase, which ran from October 1978 to the end of 1981, cost $31 million. The total restoration project cost $45.5 million (about $160.6 million in 2025 dollars). When the project was completed in 1981, the barrier island measured 3.5 miles (5.6 km) long, 1,400 feet (426.7 m) wide, and about 700 acres (2.8 km^{2}) in size. Due to its shape, it became known as "the Banana" dike. Streams were also rerouted (Mouillee Creek, Bad Creek, and Lautenschlager Drain) and a pump station installed to monitor the water level of the restored marshland. When the project was completed, it became one of the largest freshwater marsh restoration projects in North America. In 1982, remaining dredged materials were no longer needed at Pointe Mouillee and were dumped at Grassy Island further north in the Detroit River.

=== Historic designation ===
The state game area was designated as a Michigan State Historic Site as the Pointe Mouillee Marsh on February 15, 1990, with a marker being erected near the area headquarters. The historic marker reads:

Pointe Mouillee provides a rich habitat for waterfowl and small game. Late Woodland Indians, attracted by the abundant wildlife resources, settled in this vicinity. The earliest white settlers in the area, French fur traders who sought beaver pelts named the marsh "Pointe Mouillee," which means "wet point." In 1875 eight millionaire sportsmen organized the Big Eight Shooting Club, which was renamed the Pointe Mouillee Shooting Club in 1879. The marsh gradually receded over the years as Lake Erie's fluctuating waters eroded the protective barrier islands. In 1945 the Michigan Department of Conservation purchased the land with revenue from federal Pittman–Robertson excise taxes and the state Game and Fish Protection Fund. During the 1980s the department initiated a major wildlife habitat project to restore the Mouillee marshes.

Pointe Mouillee State Game has been designated as one of seven Michigan Wetland Wonders, along with Fish Point State Wildlife Area, Fennville Farm Unit (Allegan State Game Area), Muskegon Water Treatment, Nayanquing Point State Wildlife Area, the Shiawassee River State Game Area, and Harsens Island (St. Clair Flats State Wildlife Area).

== Activities ==
Pointe Mouillee State Game Area is a popular location for hunting (deer hunting and waterfowl hunting), fishing, and birdwatching. Hiking and biking are common activities along the artificial dike and marshlands, although some places are designated wildlife areas with limited access. Prohibited activities include camping, horseback riding, use of off-road or all-terrain vehicles, and trapping without written permission. There are no beaches or playgrounds, and swimming is not a viable activity. There are 7.0–9.8 miles (11.3–15.8 km) of usable hiking trails, which include causeways to access the barrier island.

While there are numerous shore fishing locations, the Michigan Department of Natural Resources maintains three boat launches within the game area. The only launch with a paved ramp and direct access to Lake Erie is located at the Huron River mouth near the park's headquarters. The other two launches are smaller gravel ramps only suitable for smaller vessels. These two boat launches only provide access to the southern marshland and are primarily used for duck hunting and fishing. One ramp is located on Roberts Road nearer the U.S. Turnpike along Mouillee Creek. The other is located at the end of Roberts Road near the footpath to the artificial dike. Another boat launch is located upstream at the Hull's Trace riverside park just outside of the park's boundaries, although this ramp can be used to access Lake Erie and the surrounding area.

Dating back to 1947, the Pointe Mouillee Waterfowl Festival has been held annually every year in September. The free festival attracts thousands of visitors for duck hunting, competitions, archery, and other events. While the 73rd annual festival in 2020 was cancelled due to the COVID-19 pandemic in Michigan, the annual festival resumed in 2021.

=== Birdwatching ===
Pointe Mouillee State Game Area is a popular birdwatching location and is listed by the National Audubon Society as an Important Bird Area. The most abundant bird species within the area include tundra swans, redheads, wood ducks, canvasbacks, gadwalls, American wigeons, mallards, blue-winged teals, lesser yellowlegs, and short-billed dowitchers. A more exhaustive list counted at least 295 distinct native and non-native birds, some of which only travel through the area during migration or for breeding.

The American white pelican has also been spotted along the Detroit River and especially at Pointe Mouillee State Game Area.

== See also ==
- List of Michigan state game and wildlife areas
