= Meso Island =

Island in Michigan

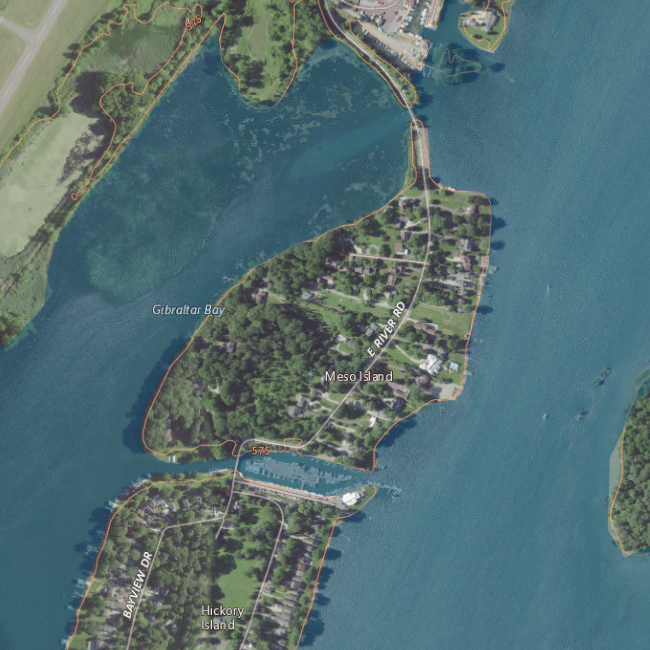
- USGS aerial imagery of Meso Island

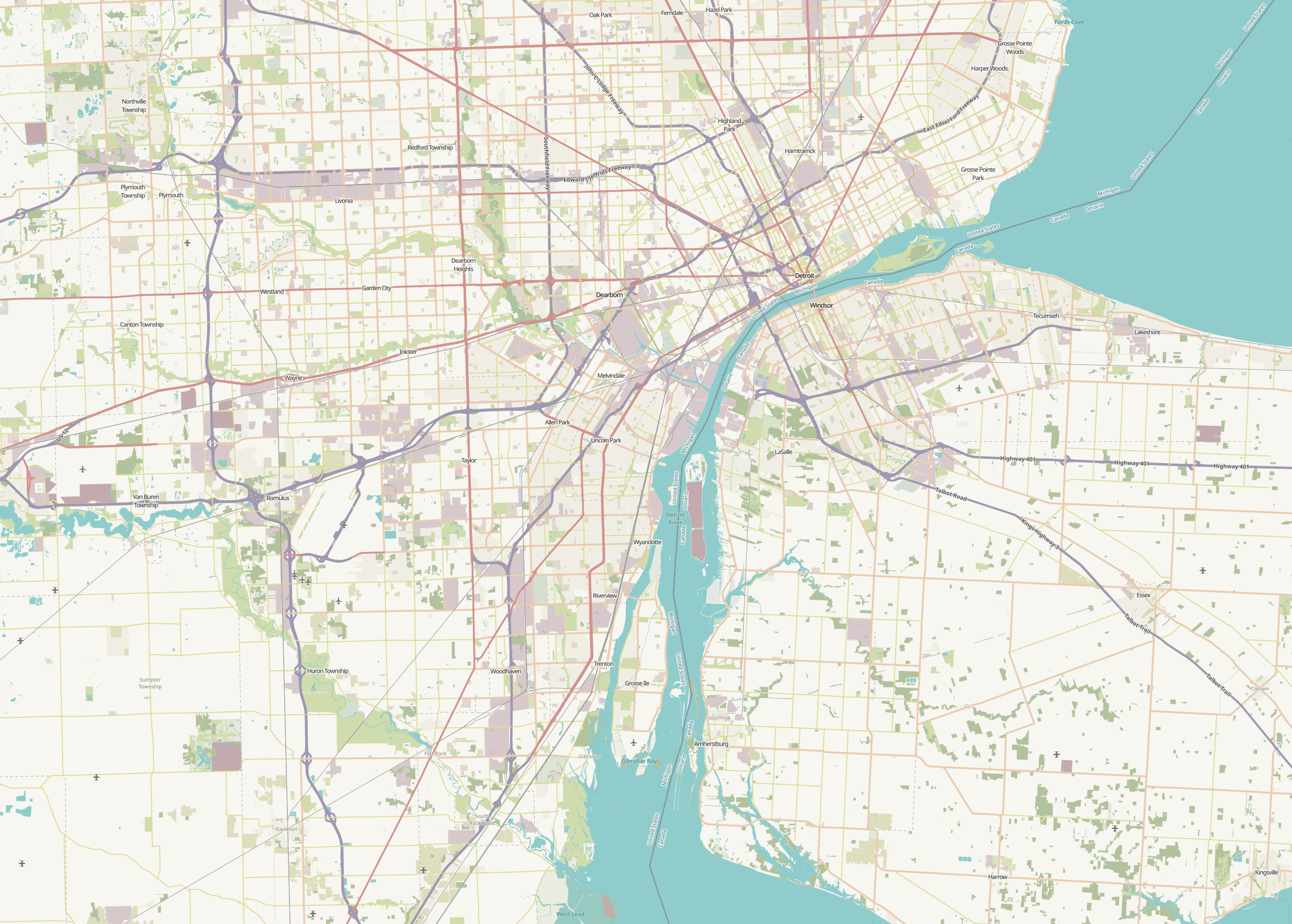
- Location within Wayne County, Michigan Location within Michigan Location within the United States

Geography
- Location: Michigan
- Coordinates: 42°05′30″N 83°09′10″W
- Highest elevation: 584 ft (178 m)

Administration
- United States
- State: Michigan
- County: Wayne

Meso Island is an island in the Detroit River. It is in Wayne County, in southeast Michigan. Its coordinates are 42°05′30″N 83°09′10″W, and the United States Geological Survey gave its elevation as 584 ft (178 m) in 1980. Numerous types of fish spawn at the island; a 1982 report by the U.S. Fish and Wildlife Service listed northern pike, carp, bullhead catfish, rock bass, and bluegill.
