= Celeron Island =

Island in Michigan

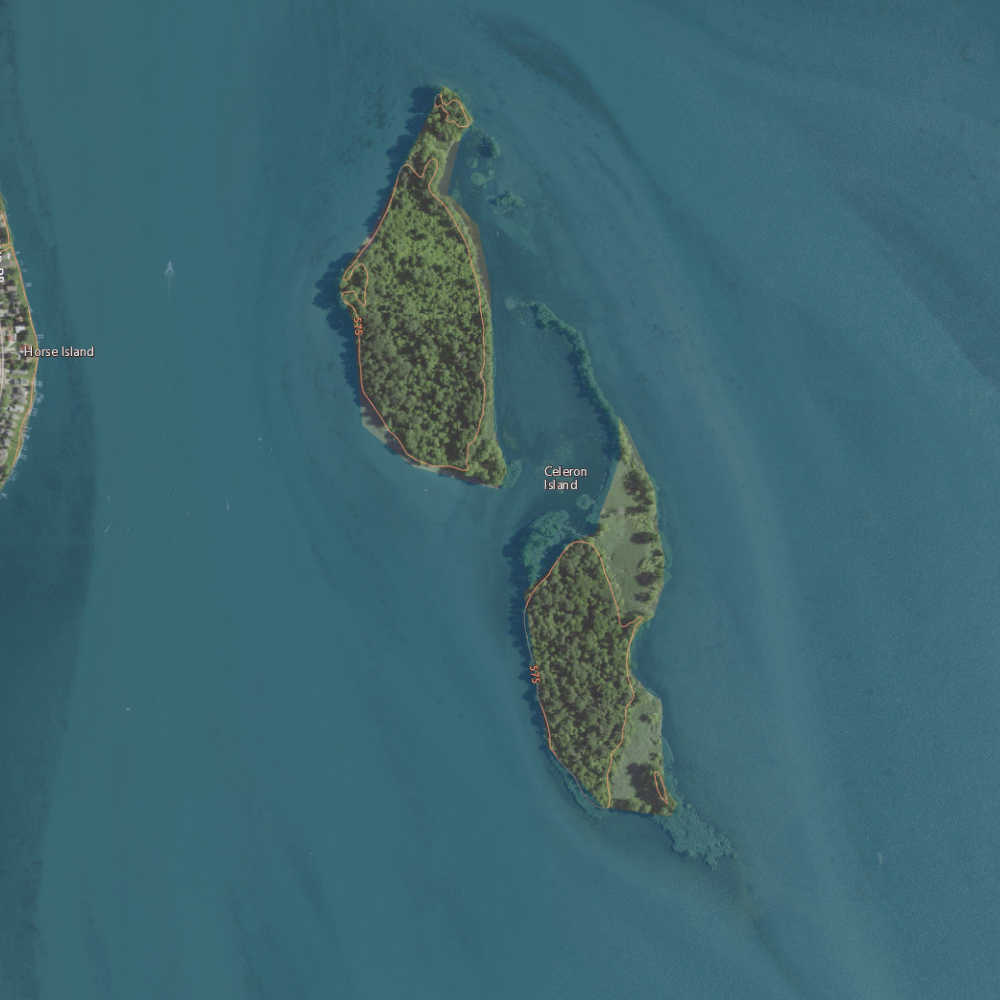
- USGS aerial imagery of Celeron Island

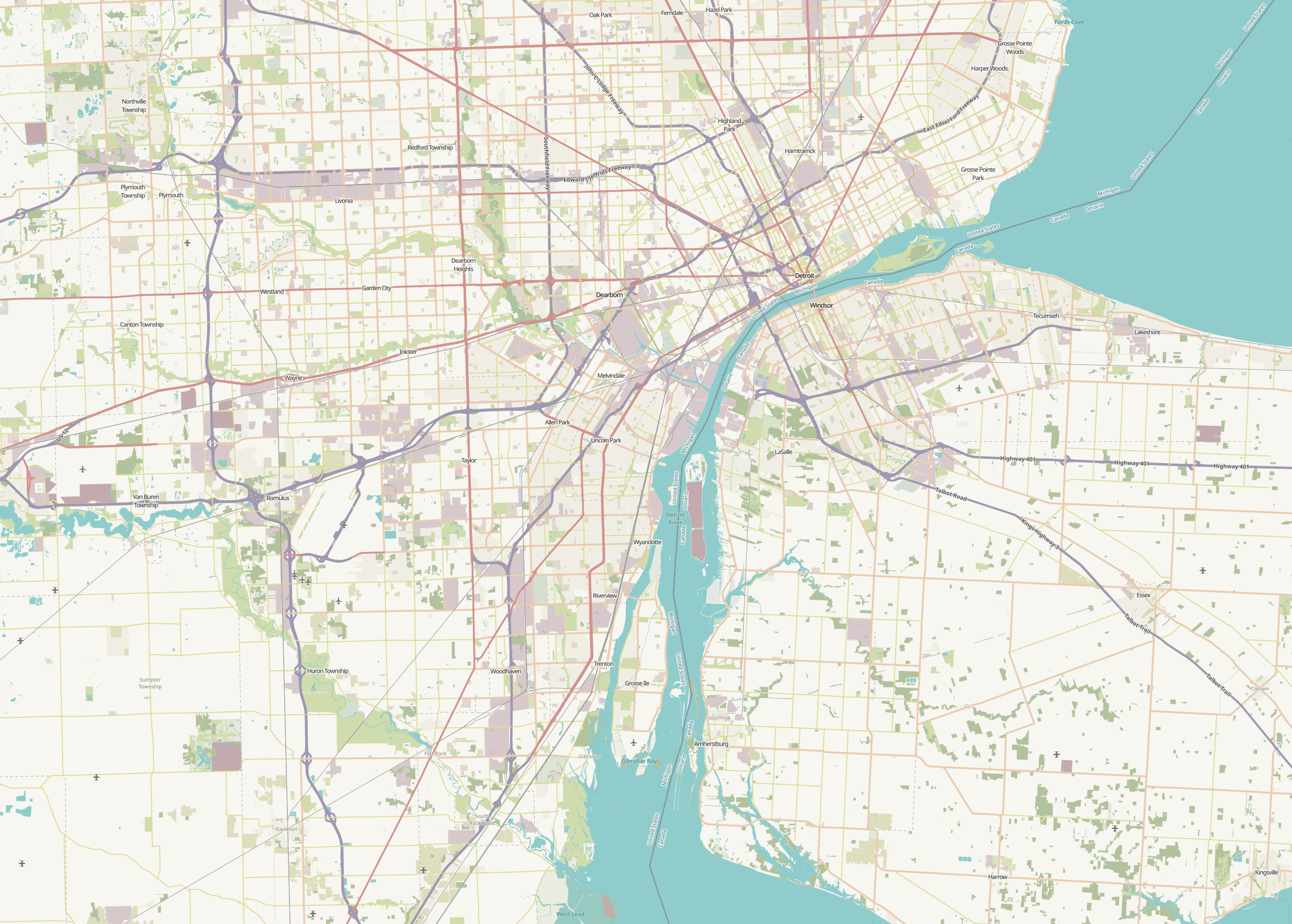
- Location within Wayne County, Michigan Location within Michigan Location within the United States

Geography
- Location: Michigan
- Coordinates: 42°04′47″N 83°10′24″W
- Highest elevation: 571 ft (174 m)

Administration
- United States
- State: Michigan
- County: Wayne

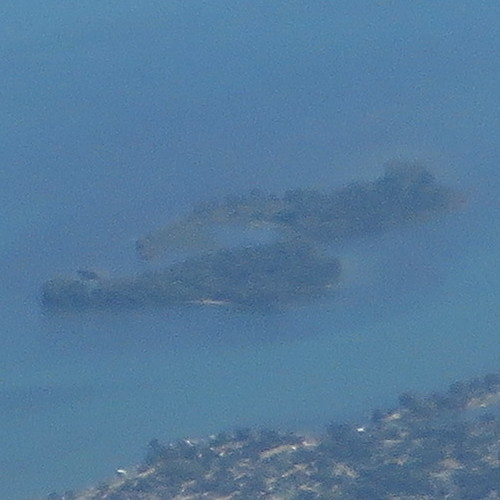
Celeron Island, seen from the northwest in a 2015 aerial photo

Celeron Island is an island in the Detroit River. It is in Wayne County, in southeast Michigan, and the southernmost island within Grosse Ile Township. Its coordinates are 42°04′47″N 83°10′24″W, and the United States Geological Survey gave its elevation as 571 ft (174 m) in 1980.

Due to erosion, it now comprises two separate islands. Celeron Island is uninhabited and administered by the Michigan Department of Natural Resources, as the island was included into Pointe Mouillee State Game Area in 1976. Celeron Island is undergoing a restoration project with funding from the National Oceanic and Atmospheric Administration.

Celeron Island was named for Pierre Joseph Céloron de Blainville.
