= Elba Island (Michigan) =

Island in Michigan

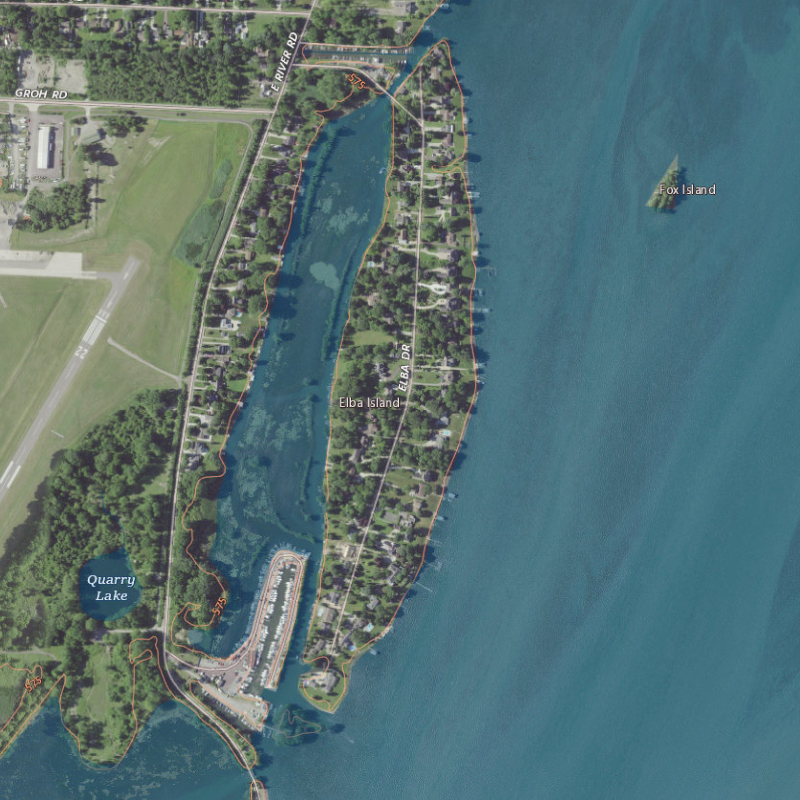
- USGS aerial imagery of Elba Island

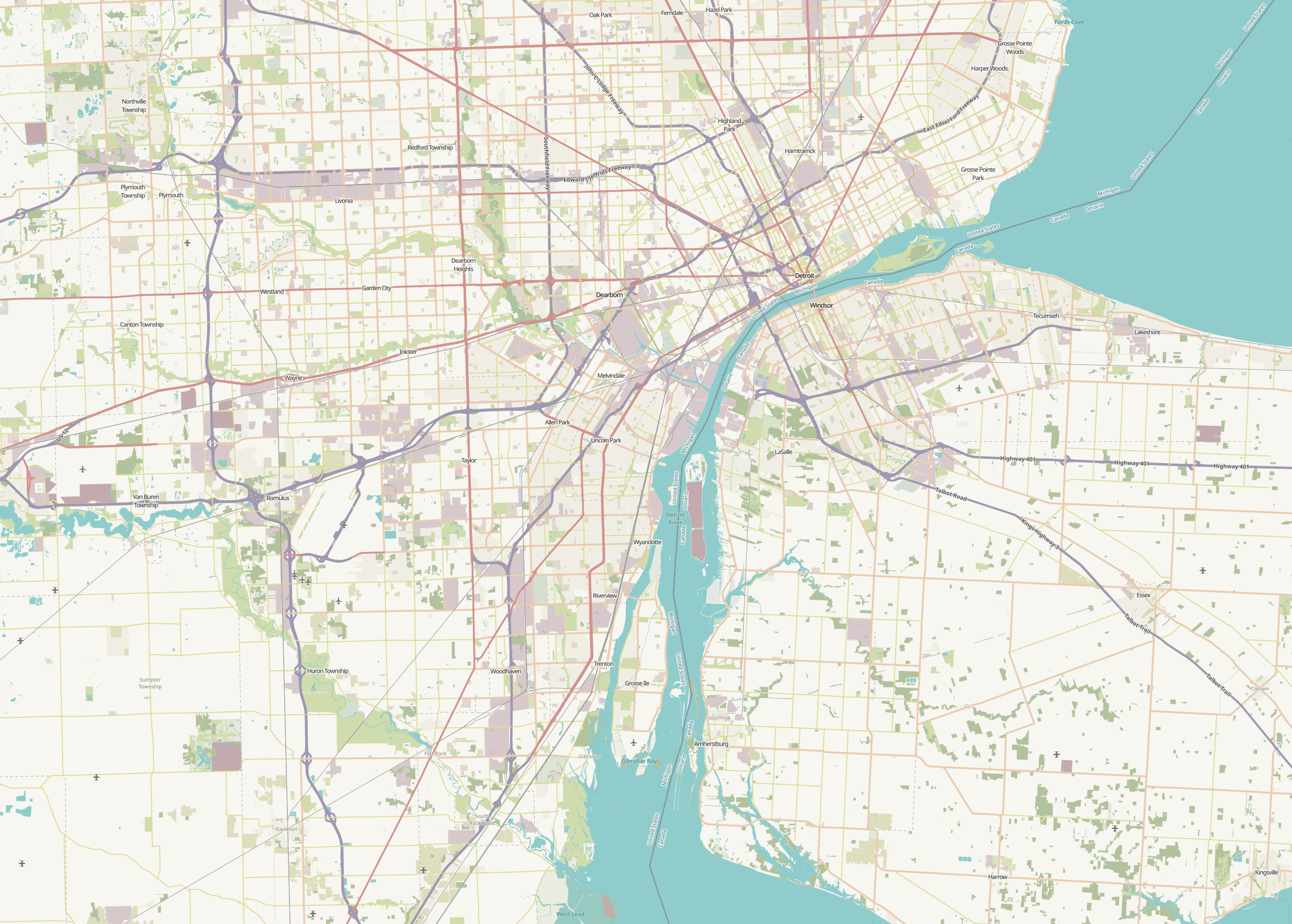
- Location within Wayne County, Michigan Location within Michigan Location within the United States

Geography
- Location: Michigan
- Coordinates: 42°06′09″N 83°08′51″W
- Highest elevation: 591 ft (180.1 m)

Administration
- United States
- State: Michigan
- County: Wayne

Elba Island is an island in the Detroit River. It is in Wayne County, in southeast Michigan. Its coordinates are 42°06′09″N 83°08′51″W, and the United States Geological Survey gave its elevation as 591 ft (180 m) in 1980. Numerous types of fish spawn at the island, including northern pike, goldfish, carp, minnow, channel catfish, bullhead catfish, white bass, and white crappie.
