= Henry Brush =

American judge (1777–1855)

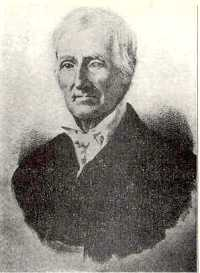

Member of the U.S. House of Representatives from Ohio's 3rd district
- In office March 4, 1819 – March 3, 1821
- Preceded by: Levi Barber
- Succeeded by: Levi Barber

Justice of the Ohio Supreme Court
- In office May 28, 1830 – December 29, 1830
- Appointed by: Allen Trimble
- Preceded by: John Milton Goodenow
- Succeeded by: John Crafts Wright

Personal details
- Born: February 12, 1777 Dutchess County, New York
- Died: January 19, 1855 (aged 77) Madison County, Ohio
- Resting place: Oak Hill Cemetery
- Party: Democratic-Republican

Military service
- Allegiance: United States
- Branch/service: Ohio Militia
- Rank: captain
- Battles/wars: War of 1812

Henry Brush (February 12, 1777 – January 19, 1855) was an American lawyer, soldier, legislator and farmer.

== Early life and legal career ==
Henry Brush was born in Dutchess County, New York in 1777, the youngest son of Lemuel and Mary (Per Lee) Brush. Henry completed preparatory studies and then studied law. He was admitted to the bar in 1803 and commenced practice in Chillicothe, Ohio. For a time, he was in partnership with his brother, Platt Brush. He married Frances and seems to have had several daughters. Another source says he never married. Henry was described by contemporaries as a tall, thin man with a Roman nose and a highly nervous temperament.

In December 1805, Henry Brush testified with other lawyers before the Ohio Senate in the impeachment trial of Judge William W. Irvin, a circuit rider who had missed a number of courts held within his circuit. Irwin was removed from office. In December 1807, Henry Brush represented Nathaniel Massie who was contesting the election of Return J. Meigs, Jr., as governor of Ohio. Brush appeared as counsel before the Ohio House of Representatives and then in joint session with the Ohio Senate. Meigs, who was at the time serving as Chief Justice of the Supreme Court of Ohio, was ruled ineligible to hold the office of governor due to residency requirements.

In August 1807, the Supreme Court of Ohio ruled in Rutherford v. M'Faddon that the law passed by the legislature was unconstitutional. Chief Justice Samuel Huntington and Judge George Tod had written the opinions supporting the ruling, essentially a restatement of the federal holding of Marbury v. Madison. The Ohio house impeached Judge Tod on the grounds that he was usurping the power of the legislature. (Huntington, who had run for governor, was spared impeachment out of respect for his office.) At his Senate trial, Judge Tod was defended by William Creighton, Jr., Henry Brush and two others. The vote for conviction was one shy of the two-thirds required. One of those voting for conviction was impeached Judge William Irwin, now elected a member of the Senate.

Henry Brush served as the Grand Master of the Grand Lodge of Free and Accepted Masons in the State of Ohio from 1813 to 1817, having previously served as Grand Secretary.

== Service in the War of 1812 ==
In August 1812, Governor Meigs received at Marietta, Ohio a letter from Gen. William Hull at Detroit stating that the army was very deficient in provisions and would perish if not resupplied by the militia. Provisions were already at Urbana, Ohio ready to be packed on horses, but awaiting a convoy of troops to protect them and open a new road, as the old one was almost impassable. On the next morning (Sunday) at Chillecothe, between 60 and 70 volunteers stepped into the ranks at the call. On Monday morning the company paraded at the Ross County, Ohio court house and elected Henry Brush, Captain. Being without uniform they agreed upon a suitable one, immediately purchased the stuff, and through the exertions of the ladies they were all completed before evening. Meanwhile, the rest of the citizens made molds and then molded bullets and buckshot; some made cartridges. Before evening, nearly 2000 cartridges had been made, each containing a ball and three buckshot. Other provisions, canteens, knapsacks, blankets and camp equipment were provided, all at the expense of private individuals. Early the next morning they started for Urbana. In less than 24 hours, a large company of volunteers had been raised, completely equipped, and was on the march through a hostile and wilderness country.

Henry Brush's company went to Urbana and were joined by more volunteers. He then made his way north with 280 men, 100 beef cattle, and the other provisions. When Brush and his company of Ohio volunteers were near the River Raisin, he sent word to General Hull that he should be reinforced and protected by an escort, as it was understood that some British soldiers and a confederate band of Shawnee Indians, all under command of Tecumseh, had crossed the Detroit river with the intention of intercepting the provision train under Captain Brush. Hull directed Major Thomas Van Horne with a detachment of two hundred riflemen of the Ohio volunteers to join Captain Brush and escort him safely to the American garrison, but Van Horne's troops were surprised by a small Indian force led by Tecumseh. In the Battle of Brownstown the first skirmish of the War of 1812, the American soldiers were panic-stricken and fled precipitously with a loss of eighteen killed, thirteen wounded and seventy missing. Hull sent another American detachment of six hundred men under Colonel James Miller to open communication with Captain Brush. At the Battle of Maguaga the Americans were met by a force of four hundred British, commanded by Major Muir, and five hundred Indians led by Tecumseh, Marpot and Walk-in-the-Water. Although inferior in numbers the Americans gallantly charged and put the opponents to flight. Both Major Muir and Tecumseh were wounded. Colonel Miller would have pushed to the rescue of Captain Brush, but was peremptorily ordered to return to Detroit by General Hull. By the time he returned, Hull had surrendered Detroit on August 16.

Meanwhile, Capt. Brush was in imminent danger of falling into the hands of the Indians under Tecumseh. When notified on the 17th by a British officer with a flag of truce, of Hull's surrender with his army, including his own command, Brush refused to accept the notice as authoritative, and escaped with most of his stores to Ohio.

Henry Brush was later a colonel in the Ohio Militia. Henry's brother John Brush was a general in the War of 1812.

== Legislative service ==
Henry Brush was elected from Ross County to the Ohio House of Representatives in 1810. Upon the resignation of William Creighton Sr., from the Ohio Senate, Henry Brush was appointed to take his seat in 1814.

In 1818, Henry Brush was elected as a Democratic-Republican from Ohio's 3rd congressional district to the Sixteenth United States Congress. During his term, he served as chairman of the House Committee on Expenditures in the Department of War. He was unsuccessful as candidate for reelection in 1820.

== Judicial service ==
Henry Brush was elected a Judge of the Supreme Court of Ohio in the 1828-1829 term. John Goodenow of Steubenville, Ohio, a Jacksonian, was chosen by the legislature in early 1830 to a position on the State Supreme Court. When Goodenow resigned because of eye trouble, his place was taken by Henry Brush who was appointed by Governor Allen Trimble and served again as Judge of the Supreme Court of Ohio from 1830 to 1831.

== Political activities and retirement ==
In the presidential campaign of 1840, William Henry Harrison traveled around Ohio and was feted wherever he appeared. At a three-day celebration in Chillecothe, it was said that Henry Brush entertained 2,500 people at meals in his home.

After his public career, Henry Brush moved to a farm in Madison County, Ohio near London, Ohio and retired to a quiet life. Henry Brush died at his farm in 1855. He was interred in Oak Hill Cemetery.

Ohio House of Representatives
Preceded by James Dunlap; Joseph Gardner; Nathaniel Massie; David Shelby; Edward Tiffin	Representative from Ross County; 1810–1811; Served alongside: Abraham Claypool, William Creighton, Jr., James Manary, Edward Tiffin	Succeeded by Abraham Claypool; Samuel Monett; Thomas Renick; David Shelby; William Sterrett as Representatives from Ross and Pickaway Counties
Ohio Senate
Preceded by William Creighton, Sr. James Dunlap	Senator from Ross County; 1814–1815; Served alongside: James Dunlap	Succeeded by James Dunlap; Benjamin Hough as Senators from Ross and Pike Counties
U.S. House of Representatives
Preceded by Levi Barber	United States Representative from Ohio's 3rd congressional district 1819–1821	Succeeded by Levi Barber
Legal offices
Preceded by John Milton Goodenow	Ohio Supreme Court Justice; May 28, 1830 – December 29, 1830	Succeeded by John C. Wright
