= Elizabeth Park (Michigan) =

Park in Michigan, United States

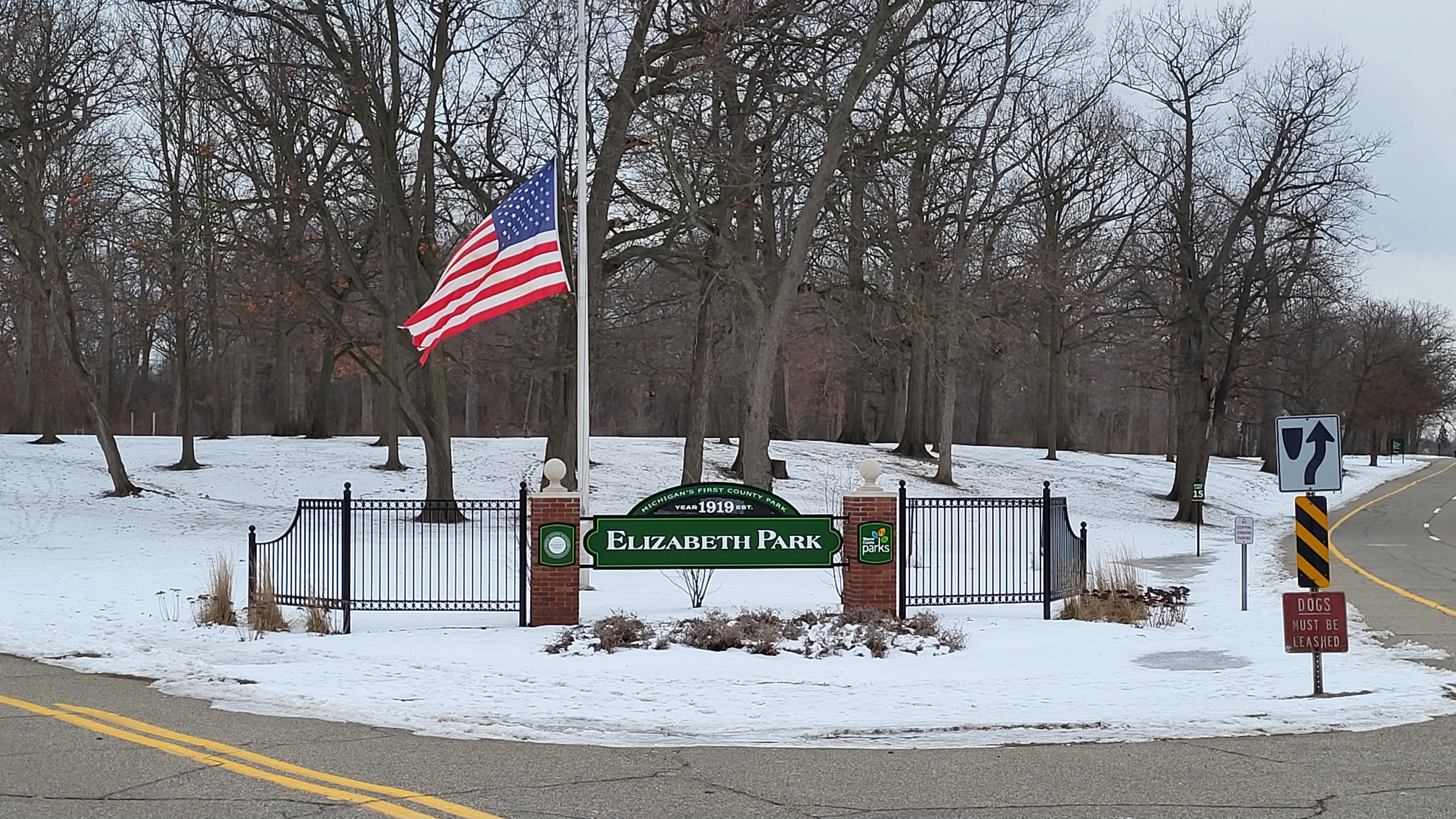
- Entrance to Elizabeth Park

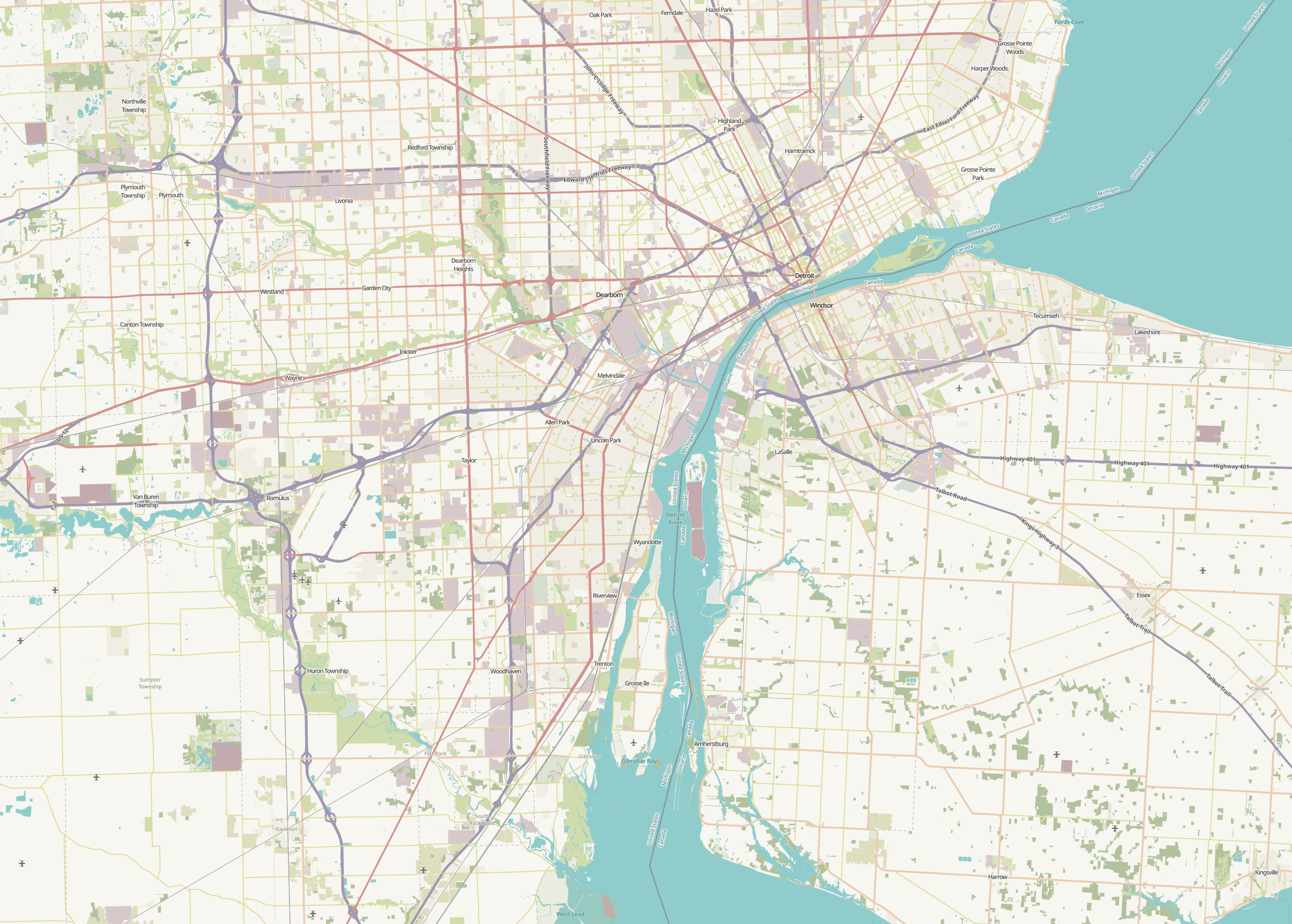
- Location within Wayne County, Michigan Location within Michigan
- Location: 4250 Elizabeth Drive; Trenton, Michigan
- Coordinates: 42°07′56″N 83°10′49″W
- Area: 162 acres (65.6 ha)
- Created: 1919
- Administrator: Wayne County Park System
- Website: Official website

Elizabeth Park is a county-owned public park in southeast Wayne County in the U.S. state of Michigan. The park is located in the city of Trenton along West Jefferson Avenue and the Detroit River just north of the Wayne County Bridge leading to Grosse Ile. Under private ownership until it was given to the county in 1919, Elizabeth Park is recognized as the first county park established in the state of Michigan.

The park is located mostly on an artificial island historically called Slocum's Island. The island is separated from the mainland by a narrow canal. While Elizabeth Park occupies the northern portion of Slocum's Island, the Trenton Channel Power Plant occupies the portion south of the Grosse Ile Parkway.

== History ==
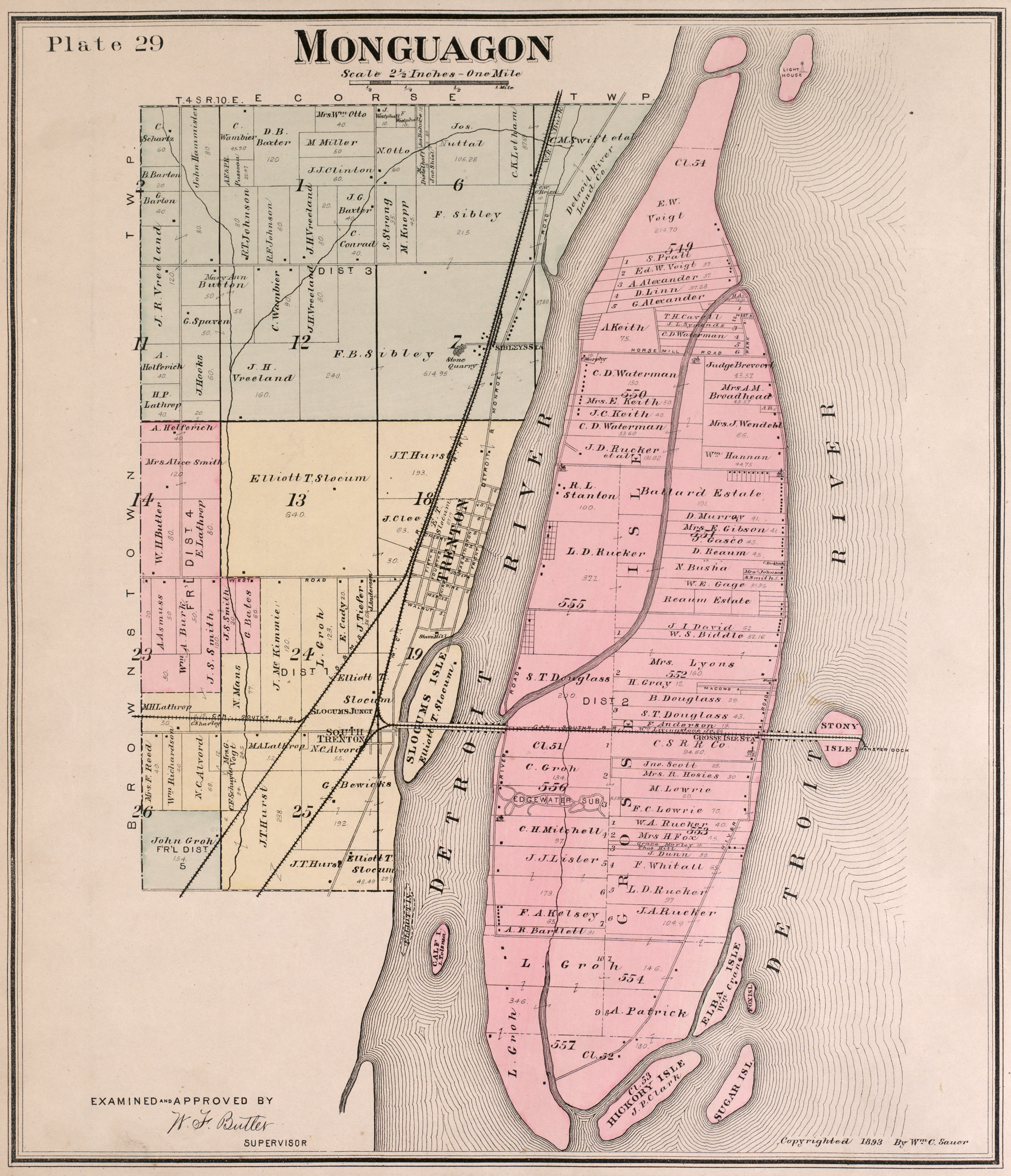
Slocum's Isle listed on an 1893 map of Monguagon Township

The area was occupied by the Native American tribe the Wyandot for several centuries before Europeans arrived to colonize the area. The Wyandot settled the village of Maguagon along the banks of the Detroit River, which was the site of the minor Battle of Maguaga during the War of 1812. The area was soon settled as Truaxton in 1816 by Abram Caleb Truax, who was a French Major who decided to stay in the area after the war. In 1827, Lewis Cass, the governor of the Michigan Territory, organized Monguagon Township with Truax as the first township supervisor. As a part of the township, the area of Truaxton was renamed Trenton in 1847 and incorporated as a village in 1855.

Giles Bryan Slocum (1808–1884), who was an early businessman and landowner, moved to Truaxton in 1834. He built Truaxton's first dock along the Detroit River in that summer. He would later manage docks up and down the Detroit River. He used his wealth to purchase three miles (4.8 km) of Truaxton's riverfront. He built his large estate on what he called Slocum's Island, which was partially separated from the mainland by his own constructed canal. Slocum married Sophia Truax (daughter of Abram Caleb Truax) in 1838, and she inherited his estate when he died in 1884. She continued to live on Slocum's Island with her only daughter, Elizabeth Nichols (née Slocum). Sophia Truax died in 1912, and Nichols then inherited the island.

Nichols died in 1919, and her children inherited the property. They donated the estate to the Wayne County Park Trustees in October 1919 on the condition that it be set aside as "Elizabeth Park" in honor of their mother. The Slocum estate, which consisted of 162 acres (65 ha), was given to the county and organized as Michigan's first county park. The donation was helpful in the creation of the Wayne County Park System, which had been hindered by a lack of funding to acquire their own properties. Though the new park system continued to have no funding afterward, the development of Elizabeth Park was made possible by financial support from the Michigan Department of Transportation, which improved the canal, created bridges connecting the island to the mainland, and built the road that circles the park.

=== Recent status ===
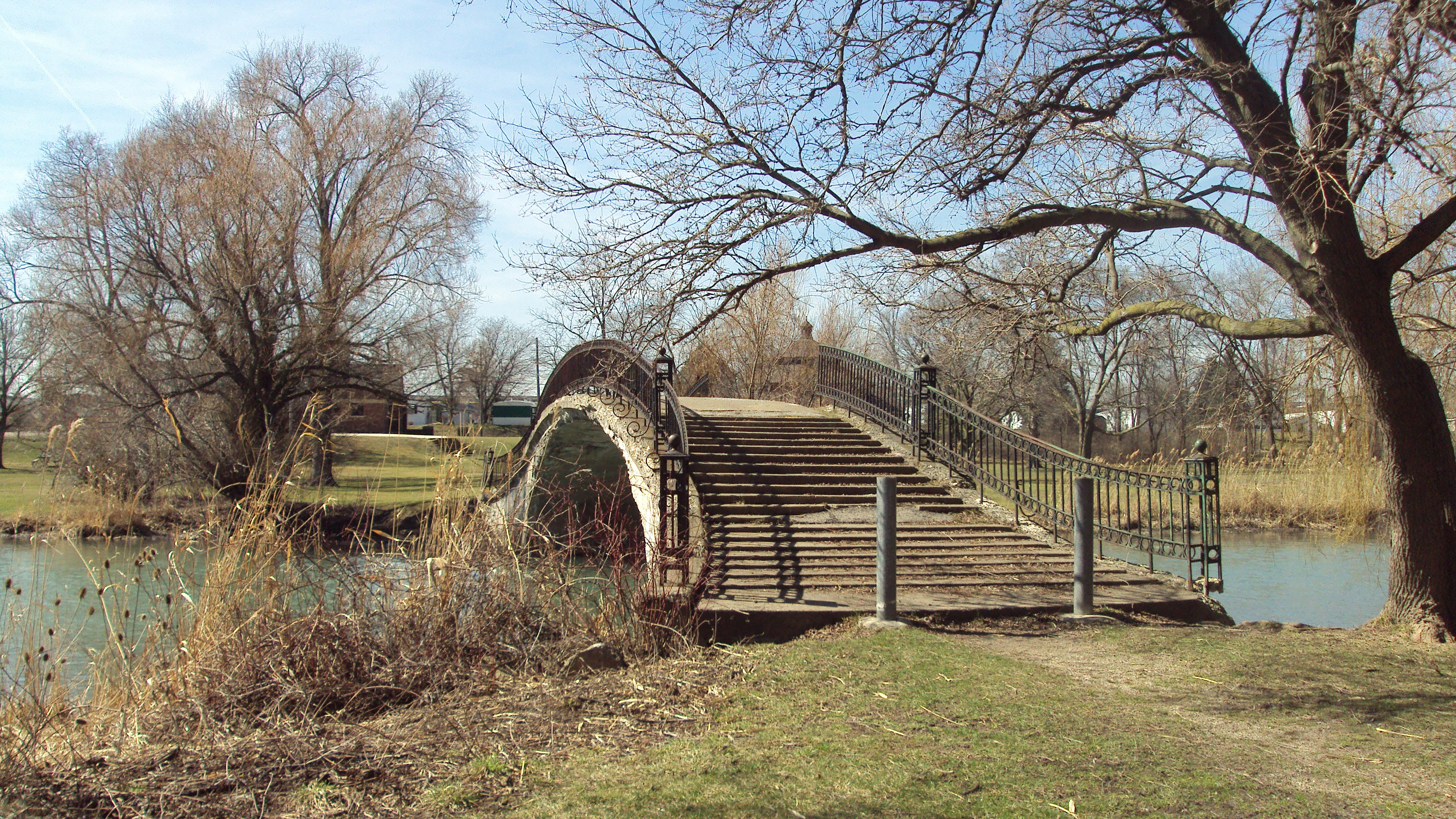
One of the three pedestrian bridges connecting the island to the mainland portion of the park

In 2003, the park underwent an over $1 million renovation of the crumbling Southshore Riverwalk, which was an original element of Elizabeth Park. The Northshore Riverwalk is also being improved at a cost of $1.2 million. This riverwalk is closer to the Trenton populace and is expected to draw in more visitors from the surrounding commercial district. The park includes a marina on the southern end near Grosse Ile Parkway. Fishing and boating remain very popular activities. Walking, skating, or fishing can be done from the 1,300 feet (396 m) of riverwalks, and the interior of the park contains hiking and cycling trails, a baseball field, skatepark, playground, and a large picnic area.

The unique pedestrian bridges that cross the canal and connect Elizabeth Park to the mainland were constructed in the early stages of the park's development. There are three walkway bridges — all named Elizabeth Park Walkway Bridge — at different locations. All three of these bridges are still structurally sound but are in desperate need of restoration. The only automobile bridge that crosses the canal is an arch bridge called the Elizabeth Drive Bridge on the north end of the park. The 59.7 ft (18.2 m) bridge was constructed in 1923 and retains most of its original features. However, like the pedestrian bridges, the Elizabeth Drive Bridge is in poor shape. The Michigan Historic Bridge Inventory lists the bridge as eligible for entry into the National Register of Historic Places.

Elizabeth Park is also mentioned for possible inclusion into the Detroit River International Wildlife Refuge, which is still in its preliminary stages of development. Since Elizabeth Park is owned by Wayne County, it is unsure at this time if the park would be included into the expanding refuge or if it would just include the surrounding waterways.

In 2013 the foot bridges around Elizabeth Park were restored, the wrought iron railings were salvaged, cleaned an replace on the new bridges. They were dedicated in May 2014.

== Trenton Channel Power Plant ==
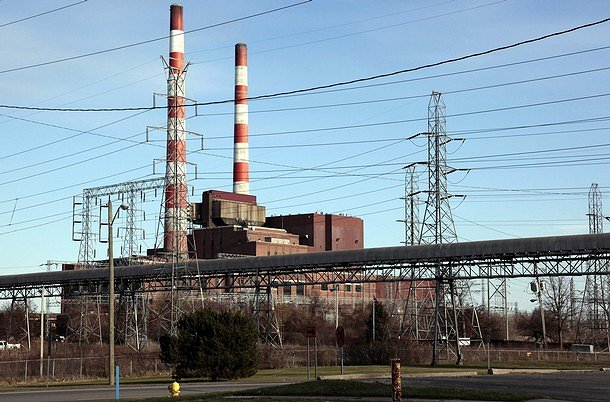
The Trenton Channel Power Plant occupies the portion of Slocum's Island directly south of Elizabeth Park.

Quite the contrast to Elizabeth Park, the portion of Slocum's Island south of Grosse Ile Parkway is occupied by the large, coal-burning Trenton Channel Power Plant, which is owned and operated by DTE Energy. This property was not part of Giles Bryan Slocum's original property that was donated to the county in 1919 but has since been included as part of the island when the original canal around Slocum's property was expanded southward. The Detroit Edison Company, a present-day subsidiary of DTE Energy, purchased the southern portion of the island and constructed the Trenton Channel Power Plant in 1949. Much of their property is on the mainland surrounding West Jefferson Avenue. The main building—the two smokestack power station—is the only portion located on what is now technically the southern portion of Slocum's Island.

Despite its nature, the power plant works closely with environmental organizations to ensure the area is free of pollutants. For their efforts, the Trenton Channel Power Plant was awarded the Wildlife Habitat Council's Corporate Habitat of the Year award in 2004 “ 14 years ago”. DTE Energy regularly spreads crushed limestone along the banks of the Detroit River on Slocum's Island, because such an item provides a popular nesting habitat for native common terns. Common terns were once plentiful in the region before industrialism drove out all but a small number of them. Other birds, such as the bald eagles, peregrine falcons, and great blue herons also use the grounds for habitat.

== See also ==
- Battle of Maguaga
- Detroit River
- Detroit River International Wildlife Refuge
- List of islands in the Detroit River
- Trenton Channel Power Plant
