= McLouth Steel =

Former American integrated steel company

McLouth Steel Corporation
- Industry: Steel
- Founded: 1934
- Defunct: 1996
- Fate: Bankruptcy
- Successor: Detroit Steel Company
- Headquarters: Detroit, Michigan 1934–1981, Trenton, Michigan 1982–1996
- Key people: Donald B. McLouth
- Products: Low carbon and stainless strip steel

McLouth Steel is a former integrated steel company. The company was once the ninth-largest steelmaker in the United States.

The company had three locations: the first was in Detroit, Michigan, the second (and largest) in Trenton, Michigan, and the third in Gibraltar, Michigan. The Detroit and Trenton plants have been demolished, while the Gibraltar plant has been restarted by Ferrolux.

== Detroit complex ==
The Detroit plant was built in 1934 by Donald B. McLouth, a Detroit scrap dealer, as a small conversion mill on Livernois Avenue. General Motors desired additional options for steel, and provided partial financing for the facility. In its later years, the plant was revamped to produce only stainless steel, and was eventually purchased in 1981 by Jones and Laughlin Steel Company.

The Detroit mill initially consisted of a small reversing hot-rolling strip mill with a slab heating furnace. The original hot strip mill was known as the "Coffee Grinder" from the sounds the mill would make. In 1938, the company brought online a single 4-high reversing cold reducing mill with ancillary facilities (annealing and finishing). Over the next few years, modifications were made to the equipment, allowing the company to roll 108,000 net tons of hot-rolled products and 60,000 net tons of cold-rolled products per year.

In 1947, McLouth Steel began rolling stainless steel. Two single-stand reversing cold reducing mills were installed with the related supplementary equipment. In 1954, $6,000,000 of the $100,000,000 expansion plan for the new Trenton plant was used to install two 4-high reversing cold rolling mills in Detroit. With this new addition to the plant, stainless steel production increased to 52,000 net tons per year.

The Detroit plant was a finishing facility for sheet and strip products only. The principal operating units were two 50-inch (1,300 mm), 4-high cold reduction mills, a cold anneal and pickle line, a temper mill, two slitting lines (36 and 24 in), and a coil polisher. The two 50-in reduction mills were essentially identical. Both were installed in 1953 by United and had a combined annual capacity of 120,000 tons. The cold anneal and pickle line were installed in 1975 by Production Machinery. The line consisted of an entry end washing section to remove rolling oils, an open air annealing furnace (where the strip was heated above 1,900 °F (1,040 °C)), and three acid pickling tanks followed by rinsing and drying units. Paper was interleaved between the coil wraps at the exit take up reel to avoid surface abrasion.

Coil product was usually shipped from the Detroit plant via truck. The Detroit plant was demolished in 2018.

== Trenton complex ==
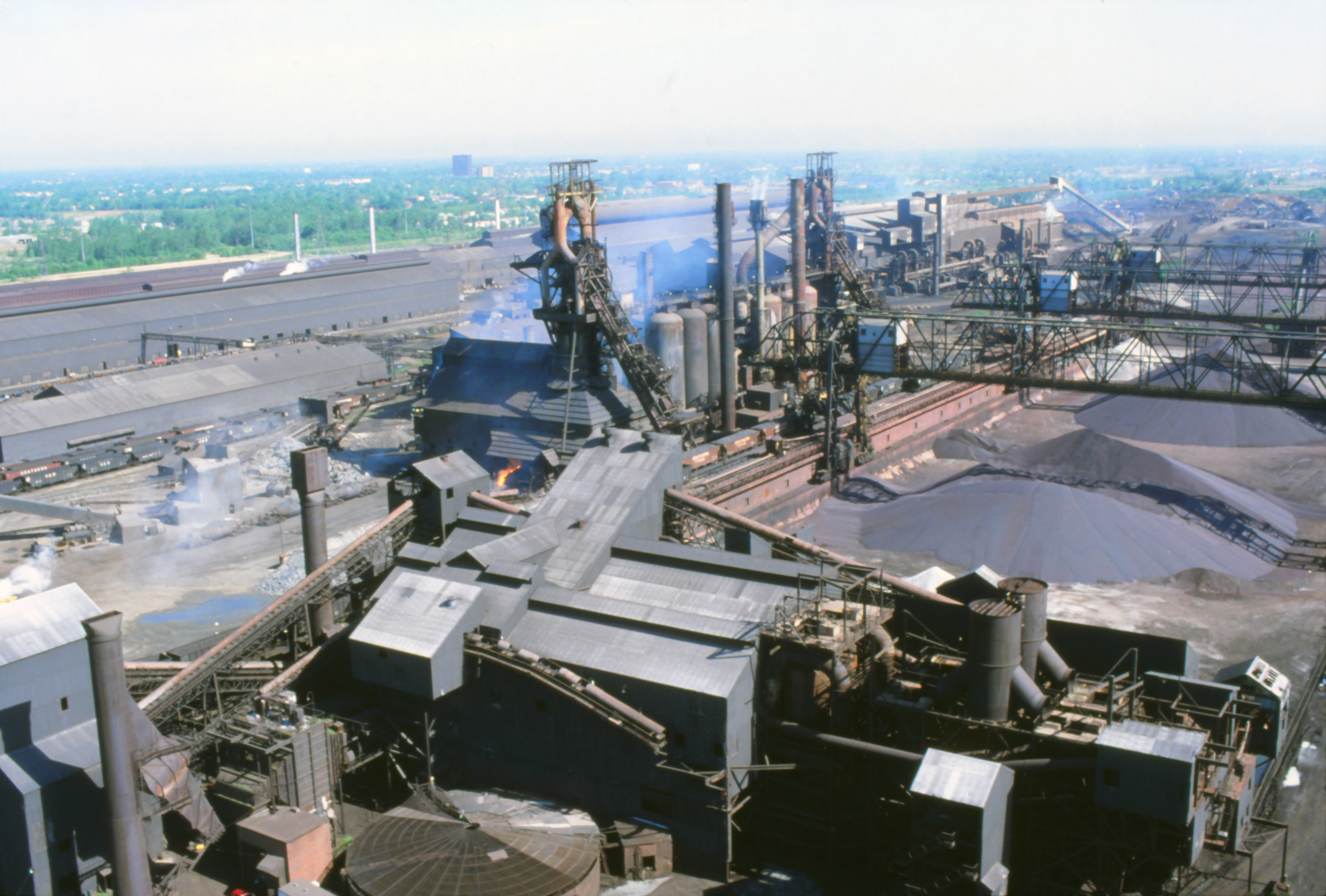
A photograph showing the majority of the Trenton, MI plant

In 1948, McLouth Steel started its $100 million expansion program by purchasing riverfront property in Trenton, Michigan, with General Motors providing a $25 million loan. Purchasing war surplus equipment from a Chicago mill (at bargain prices), the first major construction program started soon afterward. The site was laid out and four 60-ton electric arc furnaces were installed. Soaking pits, a blooming mill, a Steckel mill, a down-coiler and finishing equipment were installed. The first ingots were poured in 1949, and McLouth was soon established as a growing factor in the marketplace.

A few years later, in 1954, the Trenton plant was formally dedicated and McLouth Steel gained the ability to produce iron as an integrated steel mill. Number One blast furnace was constructed with a capacity of 1250 tons a day. The three original 60-ton basic oxygen furnace (BOF) vessels were installed and McLouth became the first plant in the United States to make steel via the basic oxygen process. Adding to the melt shop were two 200-ton electric arc furnaces. The reversing Steckel mill was replaced by a six stand continuous 60-inch (1,500 mm) hot strip rolling mill and a roughing stand was added to complement the blooming mill. More soaking pits were installed as well as a plant to supply the BOP with oxygen. Two pickle lines were added along with the slitters.

1958 saw another major expansion of the plant. A new blast furnace was constructed (Number 2), two 110-ton BOP vessels, and the related support equipment for the BOP and blast furnaces also had their capacity increased. Gas cleaning systems were installed for the melt shop. Two Rust slab reheat furnaces were installed to handle stainless steel, as well as the massive grinder and slab unpilers. The grinders, unpilers, and the pusher/bumper units for the two furnaces were supplied by Composite Forgings, Inc.

Between 1960 and 1964, one more 110-ton BOP vessel was added, bringing the 110-ton vessel count to three. McLouth became the first company to use computer controls on a hot strip mill on November 1, 1962. Significantly, the first "straight stick" slab caster was installed during this period. It was the first in the United States.

Profitable operations as well as market demand prompted a major commitment to build a continuous casting department in 1967 with the announcement of four curved mold continuous casting strands and six lines of three induction slab reheaters. Two additional 110-ton BOP vessels were also added to replace old and obsolete equipment (the 60-ton vessels). With these improvements to McLouth's steel making process, McLouth became the first steel mill to eventually produce 100% of its products by the continuous casting process, which added significantly to the efficiency of the operations and improved the quality of the finished product.

The plant was sold in 1996 to Detroit Steel Company. Up to the early 2000s, Detroit Steel primarily brought in outside steel, pickled it, and sold it. In the summer of 2009, after several failed start-up attempts, the Trenton plant had its electrical distribution infrastructure removed. In 2017, the facility entered foreclosure after owners failed to pay $3.7 million in back taxes. In 2018, MSC Land Co. purchased the land, entering into an agreement to demolish all buildings and to perform some remediation. In May 2019, the site was put on EPA's Superfund National Priorities List. Site demolition and remediation have since taken place, but the property's future remains unknown.

=== Trenton plant assets ===
==== Iron making ====
- Two blast furnaces: the number 1 and number 2 furnaces were built in 1954 and 1958 respectively, by the Arthur McKee Company. The hearth diameter was 28' 6" with a working volume of 56,676 cubic ft.
- Sinter plant: it was phased out in 1969, and was very inefficient; it produced low-grade ore from wastes from the blast furnaces.
- Three ore bridges: Built by Dravo Corp. Two cranes in 1954, with the last in 1958. 12 net tons each.
- One conventional ore yard opposite of the blast furnace, and two conveyor fed auxiliary yards.

==== Steelmaking ====
===== Oxygen process shops =====
- OP 1: Three 60-ton vessels were added in 1954. It was the first successful basic oxygen shop in the United States. The shop was dismantled in 1968 due to high operating costs compared to OP 2.
- OP 2: Five oxygen process vessels, with two 110-ton vessels added in 1958, one in 1960, and two more in 1968. All five were built by the Pennsylvania Engineering Company (PECOR). The reason that the relatively small vessels were used was due to the low ceilings in the existing building.

===== Melt shop =====
Four 60-ton electric arc furnaces were installed in 1948 as the first expansion project. Two 200-ton electric arc furnaces were installed in 1954 to replace the four original furnaces.

===== AOD shop =====
Three 100-net-ton-sized argon oxygen decarburization (AOD) vessels were installed in 1977 by PECOR. Only a total of 39 heats were produced by this process. The average time per heat was 2 hours and 15 minutes. The shop was later dismantled and turned into the ladle metallurgy station.

The entire steelmaking building, with the exception of the lime storage building, was demolished in 2005. The lime storage building was brought down with explosives on April 18, 2010.

==== Continuous casting ====
Pilot plant: the first straight stick slab casting machine in America was installed in 1963. The machine was located south of OP 1. Schloemann was the main equipment vendor, and it was dismantled in 1968.

Concast department: there were four low-profile curved molds with progressive straightening. Three molds cast 12-in thick slabs while the other cast 9.5-in ones. All molds could adjust the slab width from 36 to 57 in. Typical casting speed was 34–46 inches per minute for a 12-in slab, and 48-55 in/min for a 9.5-in slab, with a maximum of 120 in/min.

The main building was demolished in 2006.

==== Hot strip mill ====
===== Furnaces =====
Soaking pits

5 two-hole batteries. Natural gas fired. Built by Amsler Morton and the Rust Furnace Company in 1948.

Reheat Furnaces

Two conventional three zone, natural gas furnaces that were primarily used to reheat stainless and carbon slabs prior to the caster installation. 125 Net tons per hour each.

First furnace was installed in 1954. Second in 1958. Both were built by the Rust Furnace Company of Pittsburgh, PA.

Eighteen induction slab heating furnaces

Three lines of three heaters were installed in 1968, the last three lines were installed in 1969. Heaters were provided by Ajax Magnethermic and the slab handling equipment by United Engineering and Foundry.
Maximum rated capacity was 645 tons per hour.

Walking beam furnace

Built in 1985. Natural gas fired. 350 tons per hour. 1 hour heating time per slab.

===== Rolling =====
Blooming Mill

Two high 41" diameter x 92" rolls. Built by Continental in 1948. Accepted ingots up to 24" x 44" and slabs up to 57" by 12" thick. Twin 3000 horsepower motors.

Roughing Mill

Two high 43" dia. x 59.75" rolls. Built by Mesta in 1954. Twin 2500 horsepower motors.

Six Stand 60-inch (1,500 mm) Rolling mill

Four high mill stand, 25.75" x 64" work rolls and 53.75" x 60" back up rolls. Built by Mesta in 1954. Five 5000 HP motors and one 3500 HP motor. Maximum entering plate was 1.25" thick. Minimum exiting strip was .071"

Two down-coilers

Installed in 1965 by Mesta. Produced a 78" maximum opening coil.

==== Finish departments ====
Pickle Line

Built by Mesta in 1954. Used sulfuric acid. The line accepted coils up to 60" at a rate of 90 net tons an hour. The line was 553 feet long.

Slitters

Number 1 slitter

This line had a maximum coil width of 44" and 70" in diameter. Slitting width was 2.001" minimum, 42.5" maximum. Built by Wean in 1948.

Number 2 slitter

60" maximum coil width, 72" diameter. 5" minimum, 55" maximum slitting width. Built in 1948 by Wean.

Number 3 slitter

60" maximum coil width, 72" diameter. 2.001" minimum, 56" maximum slitting width. Built by Wean in 1948.

Number 4 slitter

60" maximum width. 5" minimum, 56" maximum slitting width. 45,000 PSI shear. Built by Wean in 1954.

Number 5 slitter

20" minimum, 60" maximum entry coil. 50,000 PSI shear. 9" minimum slit width. Built by Production Machinery in 1964.

Pickle line and #5 slitter remained until final demolition of the plant.

== Gibraltar complex ==
In 1954, McLouth announced the construction of a cold rolling facility in Gibraltar, Michigan, close to the Trenton Plant. This facility has a four-stand continuous cold rolling strip mill, annealing furnaces, two skin pass finishing mills and other ancillary equipment for further processing of cold-rolled steel coils.

The property the company acquired was once owned by the Gibraltar Steel Corporation. The total area was around 900 acres (3.6 km^{2}) of land along the Detroit river, bordering Trenton. Original plans called for five additional blast furnaces dependent upon the completion of the All-American Channel, a proposed channel through parts of Gibraltar. Without the channel, ore and coal haulers could not bring in the required raw materials. McLouth failed to get the proper financing to construct another integrated mill, so plans were drawn up for a stand-alone cold rolling mill.

There was a major fire that destroyed most of the pickling tower in 1970.

The plant was operated under Detroit Cold Rolling (a subsidiary of Detroit Steel Company) from 1996 (after the McLouth sale) until it was later sold to Steel Rolling Holdings in 2006. The plant was restarted by SRH, and was later purchased by Ferrolux. Ferrolux has since invested heavily into the facility.

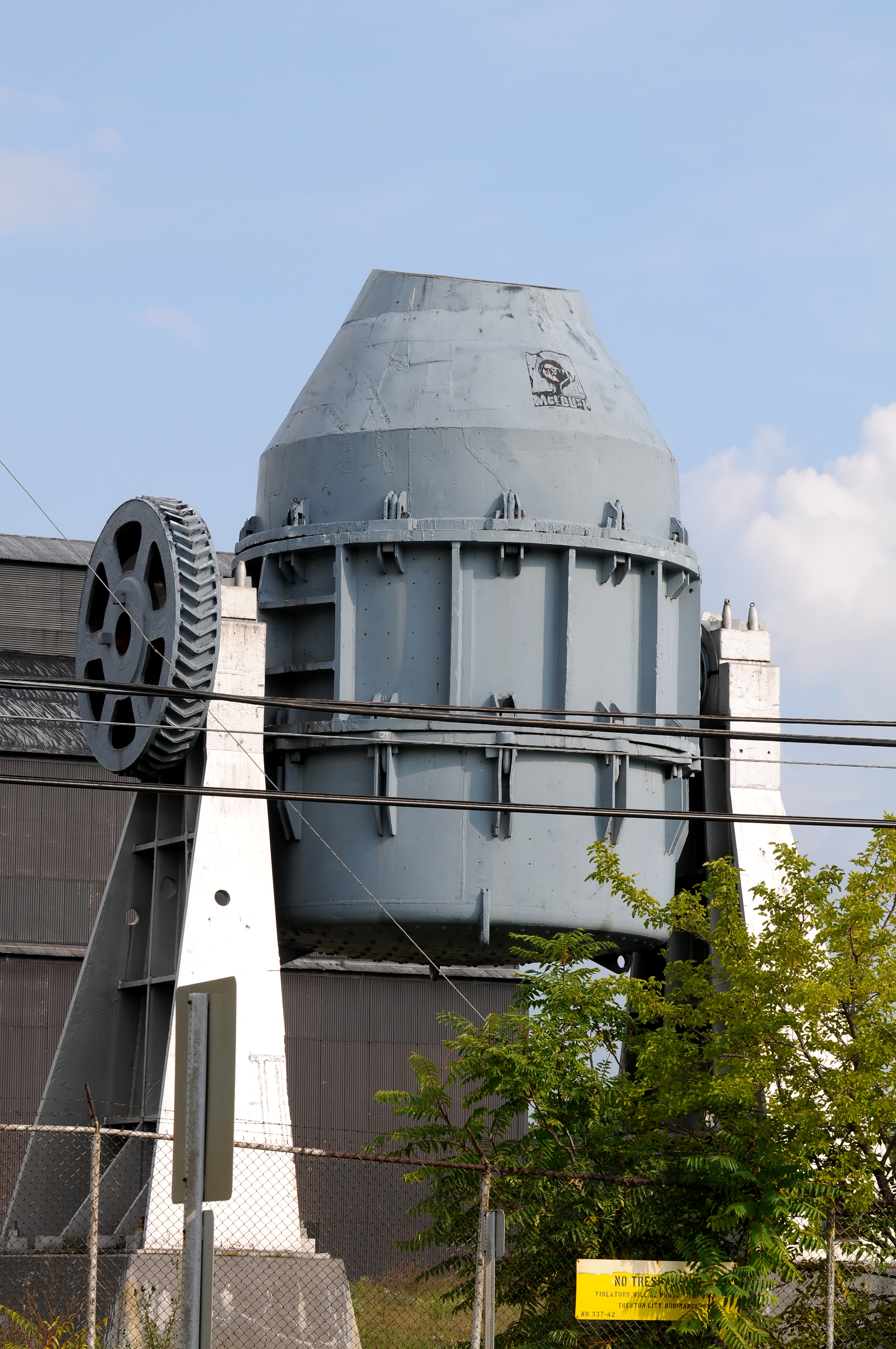
One of three original BOP furnaces from the plant

=== Gibraltar Plant assets ===
==== Pickle line ====
Pickle liquor

Hydrochloric Acid, 10,000 gallon capacity.

175°F, 10-12% HCL, 12-15% FeCL

Tower

Vertical two pass line. First of its kind in North America. 90 tons per hour maximum capacity. Built by Dravo and Mesta in 1963.

==== Tandem mill ====
Mill Stands

60" 4-high, 4-stand continuous.
Maximum 3300 feet per minute. Average speed at 2100 FPM.

Rolls

Back-up roll 53 x 60"
Work roll 22 x 60"
Width range was 26" to 52" wide.

Reduction Capability

1 stand-30%, 2 stand-25%, 3 stand-20%, 4 stand-10%

==== Annealing ====
60" Lee Wilson Bases

122 (60 in 1954; 15 in 1955; 47 in 1961)
48 Furnaces of the radiant tube type.
Charge size was 60" x 162" high.

80" Swindell Bases

90 (36 in 1968; 27 in 1971; 27 in 1974)
38 Furnaces of the direct fire type.
Charge size was 80" x 162" high.

Both furnaces used natural gas fuel.

==== Skin mill ====
Two 2-high skin pass mills.

Built by Continental in 1954. 1500 Horsepower motors. Maximum speed of 3200 FPM, average of 2800.

Roll sizes

32" x 60"

==== Finishing departments ====
Customer Service Line

Built by Wean in 1967. Line speed is 150' to 1000 feet per minute.
60 inch maximum width, 20 inch minimum.

Flying Shear Line

Two lines installed by Mesta in 1954. 800 FPM line speed.
Cut lengths are 48 inches to 144 inches.

Coil Slitting Line

Two lines built by Seco in 1954. 400 FPM line speed.

== Legacy and achievements ==
=== First basic oxygen furnace in North America ===
McLouth Steel was the first company in North America to use the basic oxygen process, a process now common in the steel industry.

The original vision for the Trenton Plant included Bessemer furnaces to supplement its electric furnaces. Trenton's city ordinances against pollution would not allow use of a Bessemer furnace, forcing McLouth to take a different approach. McLouth turned to the rest of the world to search for a solution, finding in Austria the basic oxygen furnace.

The technology not yet operating on a scale large enough for American steelmakers, McLouth gambled on an attempt to scale the unproven basic oxygen process to its needs. By 1954, McLouth's original 60-ton furnaces were in action. As the process was refined and perfected (and larger furnaces were added), this technology enabled McLouth to average 30% higher profits than its competitors between 1960 and 1966. The process was adopted by many large steelmakers in the years following McLouth's venture.

=== First online computer control ===
Online computer control of steel making processes became a reality with the first use of computers on a hot strip mill in 1962. McLouth Steel used a General Electric 312 computer for gauge control on the finishing train of a semi-continuous mill. The aim was to set up the initial roll gap and then establish correct gauge as soon as the head end of the strip emerged onto the runout table. The finishing train started running under continuous computer control on November 1, 1962.

"Probably the most exciting application of the GE 312 was to the hot strip mill of McLouth Steel Co. in Michigan. It was a difficult design in as much as each step in the process had to be varied on the basis of the measured values of the previous step. This required continuous high speed feedback to set the six different hot stands with absolute accuracy and reliability being essential; an error at one point could be magnified at the next, causing an entire process to go out of control. Fortunately, the GE 312 met the challenge." H. Oldfield, General Manager of the GE Computer Department.

The solid state circuitry of a GE 312 computer was composed of 2500 diodes, 2500 transistors, and 12,000 resistors, but no magnetic core memory. There were 20 binary digits per word or per instruction. All arithmetic was fixed point. Numbers were 19 bits plus the associated positive or negative sign, not a very big number range when expressed in decimal form, just -524,287 to +524,287. The GE 312 was designed by Arnold Spielberg of the GE Computer Department, newly formed in 1957.

=== First continuous caster ===
McLouth Steel was the first plant in North America to cast 100% of its steel by the continuous caster method, a method now commonly used in the steel industry.

In May 1962, McLouth personnel visited the Dillingen Steel Works in Germany, where continuously cast slabs larger than 100 square inches were first cast. Some sixteen months later, McLouth was operating a "straight stick" casting machine, the first in the United States.

==== Pilot plant ====
In 1963, a full-size single-strand, vertical casting machine was added to the original Oxygen Process Shop. The machine was operated for five years, helping to pioneer techniques that would be useful when the larger four strand shop was constructed in 1968. The pilot shop was operated mostly during the day, while the afternoon and midnight shifts would repair, modify, or tune the machine.

Initial slab sizes were 8" x 36". They then began to cast bigger slabs by about 10" increments up to 10" x 52". There was a noted improvement in quality, as with the ability to cast using larger molds. The pilot plant was limited to about 50 "heats" (ladles of molten steel) from the original OP shop. Over the course of operation, the pilot plant cast a little over 300,000 tons of steel.

The five-year run of the plant produced the opportunity to help develop both the equipment and casting techniques. Extensive work was performed on the design of the molds and the casting speed relative to the slab quality.

==== Casting plant description ====
Four single-strand curved mold casting machines cast around 3000 tons per day. Only two casting machines would normally cast at one time, and many people questioned the need for four units. McLouth felt that the third caster was there for coordination reasons, while the fourth was a reserve for maintenance shutdowns. Ladles were moved by overhead bridge cranes to the casting machines, which could handle two at a time.

The record slab length for the plant was between May 9–11, 1972. The slab was 44" wide and 9,972 feet (3,039 m) long, total weight was around 8,500 tons from 75 ladles. Strand two was used.

=== First use of slab induction heating ===
McLouth Steel's decision to cast unusually thick slabs (12 in) led them to reheat the slabs inductively. The whole setup was difficult to undertake, as well as uneconomical to use. The giant heaters resembled upside-down toasters, and made a loud buzzing sound when in operation.

The nature of the induction heating process is such that heat input to the slab is not restricted to the surface, but actually penetrates into the slab. The depth of penetration is determined by the frequency of the electrical power supply and the metallurgical makeup of the steel.

Although induction heating was well established as an effective and economical process, fulfilling many types of heating requirements, it had never been seriously considered for heating anything like the 12" thick by 60" wide by 26' long, 30-ton slabs McLouth wanted to produce. The fact that they wanted over 600 tons of steel heated per hour was also a complication.

Several induction heating companies were contacted to determine if they would be interested in a project of this magnitude. Just one company expressed interest: Ajax Magnethermic from Warren, Ohio. Ajax informed McLouth that they had a new coil design which would be capable of doing the job. After discussions, McLouth entered into a shared cost, joint development venture with the company to design, build, and test a prototype coil system.

Early in 1965, several small 12" thick slabs of rimmed steel were repetitively heated in a prototype 1,000 kW rectangular coil. The tests proved that cold 12" thick slabs could be heated to rolling temperature in less than one hour.

The next year, McLouth ordered 21 heaters (including three spares) as part of a $105 million program expected to be completed by the summer of 1968. The program expanded the hot metal facilities with a four strand caster and the new induction heaters. Production capacity at the plant was raised from 1,800,000 tons a year to 2,400,000.

A full-size computer system was installed to automatically switch heaters on or off as required to rebalance the phase loading and to remove the threat of a 120 kV line outage. Detroit Edison permitted McLouth a maximum phase imbalance of 43 MW. The computer shut off heaters if a limit was reached and provided printouts of hourly demands, alarms, engineering logs, as well as maintenance logs.

Overall, the system was a novel idea, but really only worked on paper. Auto transformer failures were frequent, as were bus connection failures. When all 18 heaters were running at full capacity, McLouth Steel was Michigan's second largest consumer of electricity, after the city of Detroit. The environmental impact was very low due to a closed water cooling system and heaters being shut off during non-operating hours.

== Closing ==
McLouth Steel's 1996 demise can be attributed to a mixture of causes.

McLouth only produced flat-rolled steel, with 75% of its customers being automotive. Its attempts to diversify, including purchase of trucking, coke, and ore companies, did not generate the revenue or savings projected. Multiple recessions, cheap overseas steel, and lessened steel use in cars and trucks also harmed the company.

McLouth was top-heavy, with a ratio of 1 supervisor to every 4 workers, while the union desired 1 supervisor to every 15 workers. McLouth had an extremely generous wage package, something the union was cooperative about reducing in later years as the need to cut costs increased.

In the spirit of its old slogan, "Pioneers in Steel Technology", McLouth often led the way in implementation of new processes while other steelmakers capitalized on McLouth absorbing those costs. Competitors then optimized the process, outdoing McLouth's production and efficiency. Aging and incorrectly sized equipment paired with low employee morale and productivity in the 1980s and 1990s subsequently lowered the quality of steel, creating reputation problems.

These factors, in addition to the economic conditions of the era, helped bring about the closure of a small, innovative, integrated steel company.
