= Trenton, Michigan =

- City
- City of Trenton
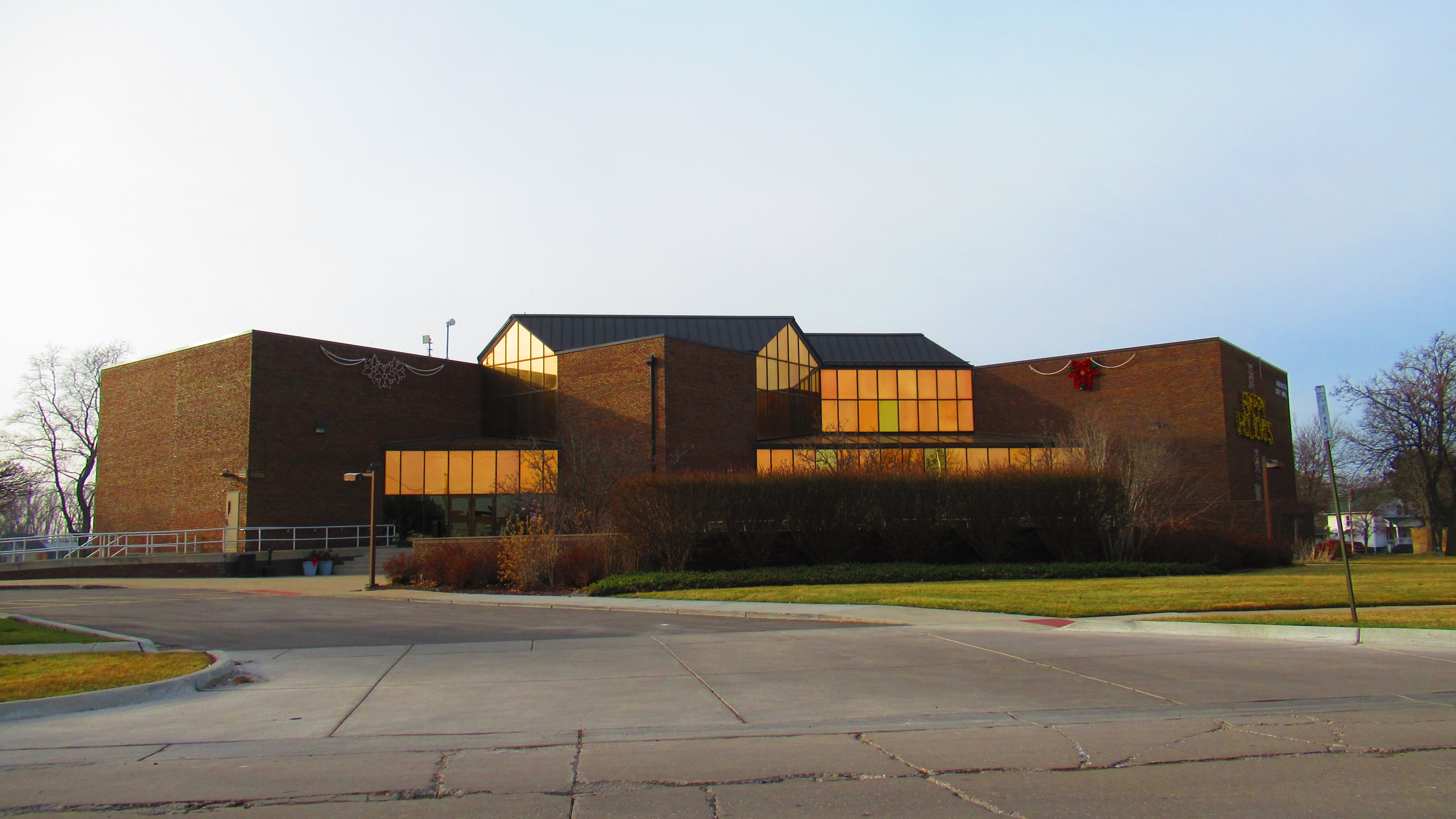
- Trenton City Hall on Third Street

- Seal

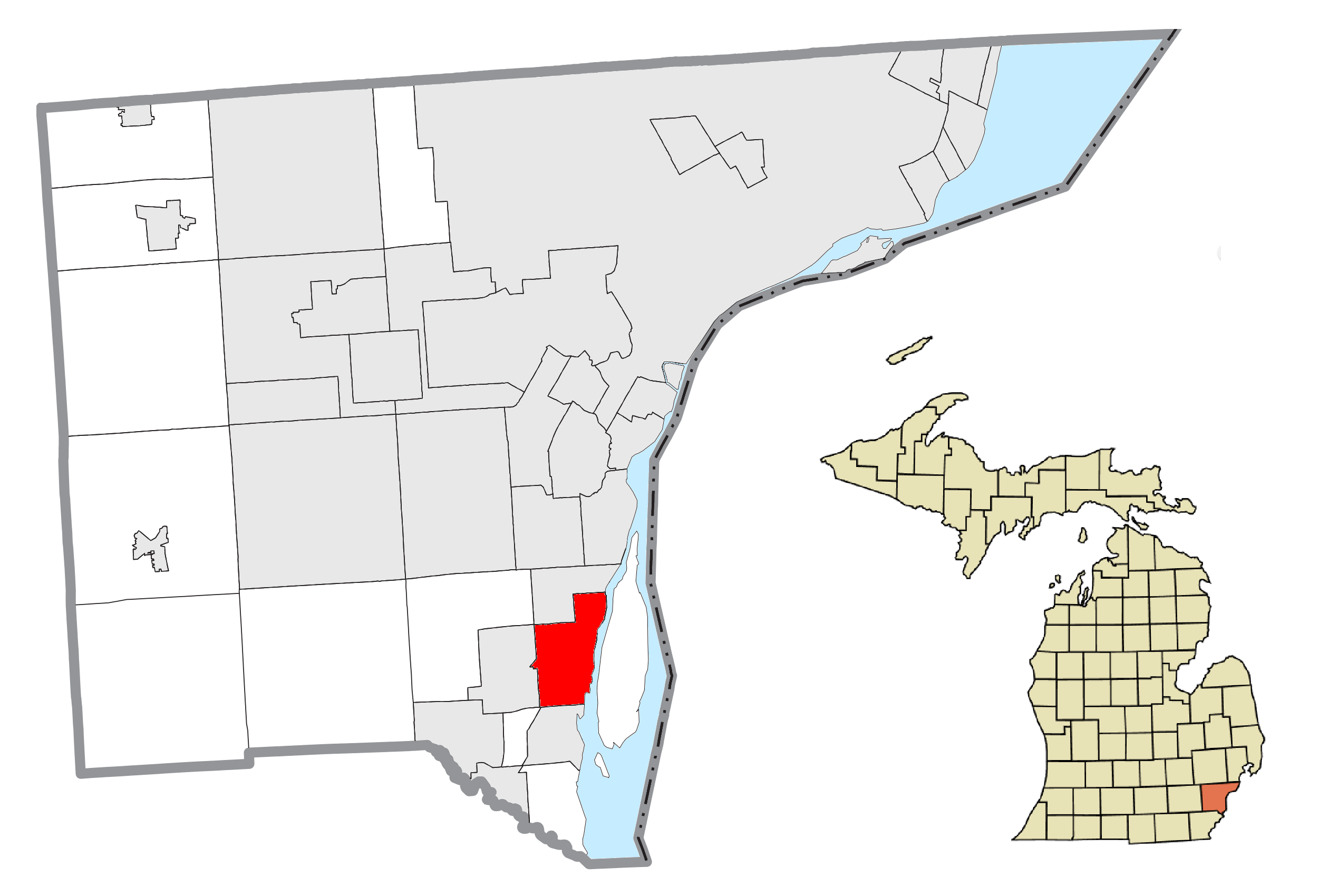
- Location within Wayne County

- Location within the State of Michigan Location within the United States
- Coordinates: 42°08′22″N 83°10′42″W
- Country: United States
- State: Michigan
- County: Wayne
- Settled: 1816
- Incorporated: 1855 (village); 1957 (city)

Government
  - Type: Council–manager
  - Mayor: Steven Rzeppa
  - Administrator: Dean Creech (Acting)
  - Clerk: Debra Devitt

Area
  - City: 7.55 sq mi (19.55 km^{2})
  - Land: 7.24 sq mi (18.76 km^{2})
  - Water: 0.31 sq mi (0.79 km^{2})
- Elevation: 597 ft (182 m)

Population (2020)
  - City: 18,544
  - Density: 2,559.9/sq mi (988.38/km^{2})
  - Metro: 4,285,832 (Metro Detroit)
- Time zone: UTC-5 (EST)
  - Summer (DST): UTC-4 (EDT)
- ZIP code(s): 48183
- Area code: 734
- FIPS code: 26-80420
- GNIS feature ID: 1615062
- Website: www.trentonmi.org

Trenton is a city in Wayne County in the U.S. state of Michigan. A Downriver suburb of Detroit, Trenton is located roughly 18 miles (29.0 km) southwest of downtown Detroit. As of the 2020 census, the city had a population of 18,544.

A Shawnee village was built in the area by legendary war chief Blue Jacket after the 1795 Treaty of Greenville. The area later became the site of the Battle of Monguagon between Americans and a British-Indian coalition during the War of 1812. The battle is commemorated with a Michigan State Historical Site marker in present-day Elizabeth Park, which was the first county park in Michigan when it was established in 1919. Portions of the Detroit River International Wildlife Refuge are within the southern portion of Trenton.

The area was once part of the now-defunct Monguagon Township. Trenton was incorporated as a village in 1855 and again as a city in 1957. Trenton is known for its waterfront and growing boating community. Major industries include Stellantis-Chrysler's Trenton Engine Plant, Solutia, and the DTE Energy Trenton Channel Power Plant. Corewell Health Trenton Hospital is located within city limits and has 203 beds. The former McLouth Steel plant is also located in the city. The city operates the 21,000-square-foot (2,000 m^{2}) Trenton Veterans Memorial Library and a historical museum.

== History ==
The founder of Trenton is considered to be Abram Caleb Truax, a member of the territorial militia in attendance when General William Hull surrendered Detroit to the British General Isaac Brock early in the War of 1812. After the war, in 1816, Truax acquired a large tract of land in the Michigan Territory along the Detroit River from the U.S. government and constructed a sawmill, church and store in what is today downtown Trenton. When Territorial Governor Lewis Cass organized Monguagon Township in 1827, Truax became the first township supervisor. He laid out the village of Truaxton in 1834. A post office had been established there named "Monguago" in 1828 with Truax as the first postmaster. The post office name was changed to "Truago" in 1837, and to "Trenton" in 1847, after a type of limestone mined from a local quarry. The village was platted and recorded under the name Trenton in 1850 by Abram Truax's son and daughter George Brigham Truax and Sophia Slocum, the wife of industrialist Giles Slocum. The Slocum family estate was given to the county, becoming what is known as Elizabeth Park, named after Elizabeth Slocum.

In 1834 an industrialist, Giles Bryan Slocum, constructed a dock, making Trenton a major hub of steamboat traffic. In 1846, Captain Arthur Edwards founded the Detroit & Cleveland Steamboat Company in Trenton. Through the late 1880s Trenton, like several Downriver communities, was known for its extensive shipyards. Sibley, Michigan would not be incorporated into Trenton until 1929.

Trenton was incorporated as a village in 1855.

A Detroit businessman and later Michigan's first U.S. attorney, Solomon Sibley, started a limestone quarry near Trenton, near what is today Fort Street and Sibley Road. Materials from the quarry were used to construct structures in Detroit, most notably Fort Detroit along the Detroit River. The quarry was later sold to Austin Church, who used limestone to make baking soda, which he sold under his family's nameplate, Arm & Hammer. In 1900 the quarry was the site of the Sibley Quarry explosion.

Through the late 1880s and even early 1900s, Trenton prospered because it was roughly a day's journey between Detroit and Monroe, Michigan, which meant people traveling between the two cities would have to stop overnight in Trenton. Painted center lines, an innovation vital to the traffic control of modern road transport, were first implemented in 1911 by the innovator Edward N. Hines on River Road (modern West Jefferson Avenue).

Trenton annexed the village of Sibley (along the modern Riverview border) in 1929, extending the city's northern boundary to modern-day Sibley Road. Trenton was incorporated as a city in 1957. In 1920 a small light railroad ran along West Jefferson to Wyandotte. The rail services ended in 1934. The tracks were removed in 1942 for the war effort.

== Geography ==
According to the United States Census Bureau, the city has a total area of 7.51 square miles (19.45 km^{2}), of which 7.28 square miles (18.86 km^{2}) is land and 0.23 square miles (0.60 km^{2}) is water. The city is located between Detroit and Monroe, Michigan, in the southeastern part of the state. The city is located on the western bank of the Detroit River and is bounded by Grosse Ile to the east, Gibraltar to the south, Riverview to the north, Brownstown Township to the west and south and Woodhaven to the west.

== Demographics ==
Historical population
Census	Pop.	Note	%±
1880	1,103		—
1890	789		−28.5%
1920	1,682		—
1930	4,022		139.1%
1940	5,284		31.4%
1950	6,222		17.8%
1960	18,439		196.4%
1970	24,127		30.8%
1980	22,762		−5.7%
1990	20,586		−9.6%
2000	19,584		−4.9%
2010	18,853		−3.7%
2020	18,544		−1.6%
U.S. Decennial Census

=== Racial and ethnic composition ===
Trenton city, Michigan – Racial and ethnic composition Note: the US Census treats Hispanic/Latino as an ethnic category. This table excludes Latinos from the racial categories and assigns them to a separate category. Hispanics/Latinos may be of any race.
Race / Ethnicity (NH = Non-Hispanic)	Pop 2000	Pop 2010	Pop 2020	% 2000	% 2010	% 2020
White alone (NH)	18,688	17,549	16,157	95.42%	93.08%	87.13%
Black or African American alone (NH)	73	251	377	0.37%	1.33%	2.03%
Native American or Alaska Native alone (NH)	78	89	69	0.40%	0.47%	0.37%
Asian alone (NH)	150	133	136	0.77%	0.71%	0.73%
Native Hawaiian or Pacific Islander alone (NH)	4	2	1	0.02%	0.01%	0.01%
Other race alone (NH)	1	8	61	0.01%	0.04%	0.33%
Mixed race or Multiracial (NH)	200	223	765	1.02%	1.18%	4.13%
Hispanic or Latino (any race)	390	598	978	1.99%	3.17%	5.27%
Total	19,584	18,853	18,544	100.00%	100.00%	100.00%

=== 2020 census ===
As of the 2020 census, Trenton had a population of 18,544. The median age was 46.8 years. 18.4% of residents were under the age of 18 and 22.4% of residents were 65 years of age or older. For every 100 females there were 93.2 males, and for every 100 females age 18 and over there were 89.4 males age 18 and over.

100.0% of residents lived in urban areas, while 0.0% lived in rural areas.

There were 8,246 households in Trenton, of which 24.2% had children under the age of 18 living in them. Of all households, 45.5% were married-couple households, 18.7% were households with a male householder and no spouse or partner present, and 30.7% were households with a female householder and no spouse or partner present. About 33.7% of all households were made up of individuals and 17.3% had someone living alone who was 65 years of age or older.

There were 8,600 housing units, of which 4.1% were vacant. The homeowner vacancy rate was 0.6% and the rental vacancy rate was 3.6%.

Racial composition as of the 2020 census
Race	Number	Percent
White	16,487	88.9%
Black or African American	387	2.1%
American Indian and Alaska Native	91	0.5%
Asian	139	0.7%
Native Hawaiian and Other Pacific Islander	2	0.0%
Some other race	197	1.1%
Two or more races	1,241	6.7%

=== 2010 census ===
As of the census of 2010, there were 18,853 people, 7,988 households, and 5,159 families residing in the city. The population density was 2,589.7 inhabitants per square mile (999.9/km^{2}). There were 8,539 housing units at an average density of 1,172.9 per square mile (452.9/km^{2}). The racial makeup of the city was 95.5% White, 1.3% African American, 0.5% Native American, 0.7% Asian, 0.5% from other races, and 1.4% from two or more races. Hispanic or Latino of any race were 3.2% of the population.

There were 7,988 households, of which 27.9% had children under the age of 18 living with them, 49.1% were married couples living together, 11.3% had a female householder with no husband present, 4.2% had a male householder with no wife present, and 35.4% were non-families. 32.3% of all households were made up of individuals, and 16.4% had someone living alone who was 65 years of age or older. The average household size was 2.33 and the average family size was 2.95.

The median age in the city was 45 years. 21.3% of residents were under the age of 18; 7.7% were between the ages of 18 and 24; 21% were from 25 to 44; 30.3% were from 45 to 64; and 19.8% were 65 years of age or older. The gender makeup of the city was 48.1% male and 51.9% female.

=== 2000 census ===
As of the census of 2000, there were 19,584 people, 8,137 households, and 5,590 families residing in the city. The population density was 2,682.8 inhabitants per square mile (1,035.8/km^{2}). There were 8,345 housing units at an average density of 1,143.2 per square mile (441.4/km^{2}). The racial makeup of the city was 96.92% White, 0.37% African American, 0.41% Native American, 0.78% Asian, 0.03% Pacific Islander, 0.23% from other races, and 1.26% from two or more races. Hispanic or Latino of any race were 1.99% of the population.

There were 8,137 households, out of which 29.8% had children under the age of 18 living with them, 55.6% were married couples living together, 10.0% had a female householder with no husband present, and 31.3% were non-families. 28.6% of all households were made up of individuals, and 14.1% had someone living alone who was 65 years of age or older. The average household size was 2.38 and the average family size was 2.93.

In the city, the population was spread out, with 23.3% under the age of 18, 6.0% from 18 to 24, 26.8% from 25 to 44, 24.3% from 45 to 64, and 19.6% who were 65 years of age or older. The median age was 42 years. For every 100 females, there were 90.9 males. For every 100 females age 18 and over, there were 86.3 males.

The median income for a household in the city was $49,566, and the median income for a family was $61,891. Males had a median income of $52,123 versus $31,892 for females. The per capita income for the city was $25,288. About 4.0% of families and 5.1% of the population were below the poverty line, including 6.1% of those under age 18 and 4.1% of those age 65 or over.

== Transportation ==
- M-85: Known locally as Fort Street, it runs north–south through the center of Trenton and connects with Interstate 75 about 3 miles (4.8 km) south of Trenton.
- West Jefferson Avenue runs north–south along the eastern portion of Trenton near the Detroit River.
- Wayne County Bridge connects the city of Trenton to Grosse Ile Township across the Trenton Channel of the Detroit River.

== Economy ==
Trenton has an unemployment rate of 6.5%, higher than the US average of 3.7%. The sales tax rate is 6.0%, below the US average of 6.2%. The income tax rate is 4.3%, below the US average is 4.6%. The recent job growth rates in Trenton is at 0.7%, below the US average of 1.6%. The future job growth rates are estimated to be 35%, above the US average of 33.5%. Per capita income in Flat Rock is at an average rate of $31,870, above the average of $31,177. The average household income is $59,943, above the US average of $57,652. The family median income is $78,100 above the US average of $70,850.

Trenton is home to many large industrial facilities, including Solutia, Chrysler Trenton Engine Plant, the Trenton Channel Power Plant, Kerkstra Precast, and the former Vulcan Mold and McLouth Steel properties.

=== Trenton Channel Power Plant ===
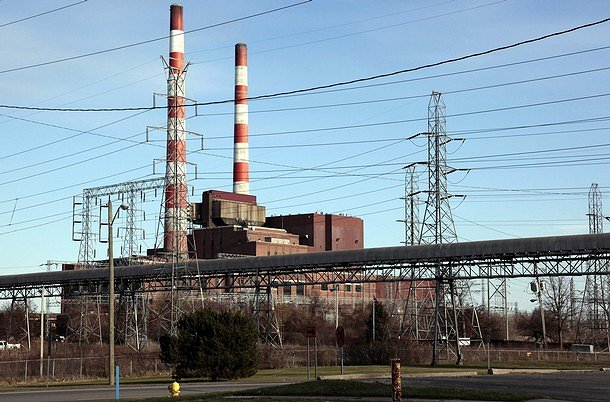
Trenton Channel Power Plant

The Trenton Channel Power Plant, a coal-burning power station in Trenton, opened on the shoreline of Detroit River in 1924, on the south side of Slocum Island. It is owned by Detroit Edison, a subsidiary of DTE Energy. It had 6 turbine generators with 13 coal-fired boilers when first commissioned. Each unit produced a rated 50 megawatts of electricity. Five short smoke stacks exhausted gases from the boilers. These were the first Detroit Edison units to use pulverized coal rather than the older style stoker-fired beds of coal. They were also the first power plants in the US to use electrostatic precipitators to capture fly ash from the stacks. Electrostatic precipitators, however, were in use in other industries at the time. In 1950, a second plant started up at the same site and adjoined the first plant. It had two turbine generators, #7 and #8, with a rating of 120 megawatts each. Two short smoke stacks released gases from the four boilers. Finally in 1968, Unit #9 was placed in service. It is a 550-megawatt turbine generator fed by a single boiler. It adjoins the high side plant and is located on the south side. One 563-foot-tall smoke stack is used for this unit. Soon afterwards, another stack, identical to the #9 stack, was erected to replace the two short stacks on the high side plant. Both tall stacks remain in service as of 2012.

The characteristic striped smokestacks were constructed with an innovative “smokestack within a smokestack” design to reduce the level of pollutants released. The inner smokestacks were lined with asbestos to achieve this, which ended up later being removed at great cost. The plant strives to keep its area pollutant-free. In 2002, the facility was designated a corporate wildlife habitat by the Wildlife Habitat Council. Because of their efforts, the Trenton Channel Power Plant and Sibley Quarry were co-awarded the Wildlife Habitat Council's Corporate Habitat of the Year award in 2004.

By the mid-1970s, the low side plant was decommissioned and the boiler house was eventually demolished. In the 2010s, all generators except #9 were closed. The power plant is scheduled to close by 2023, because DTE Energy is planning to change to natural gas and renewable energy power plants.

=== McLouth Steel Trenton Plant ===
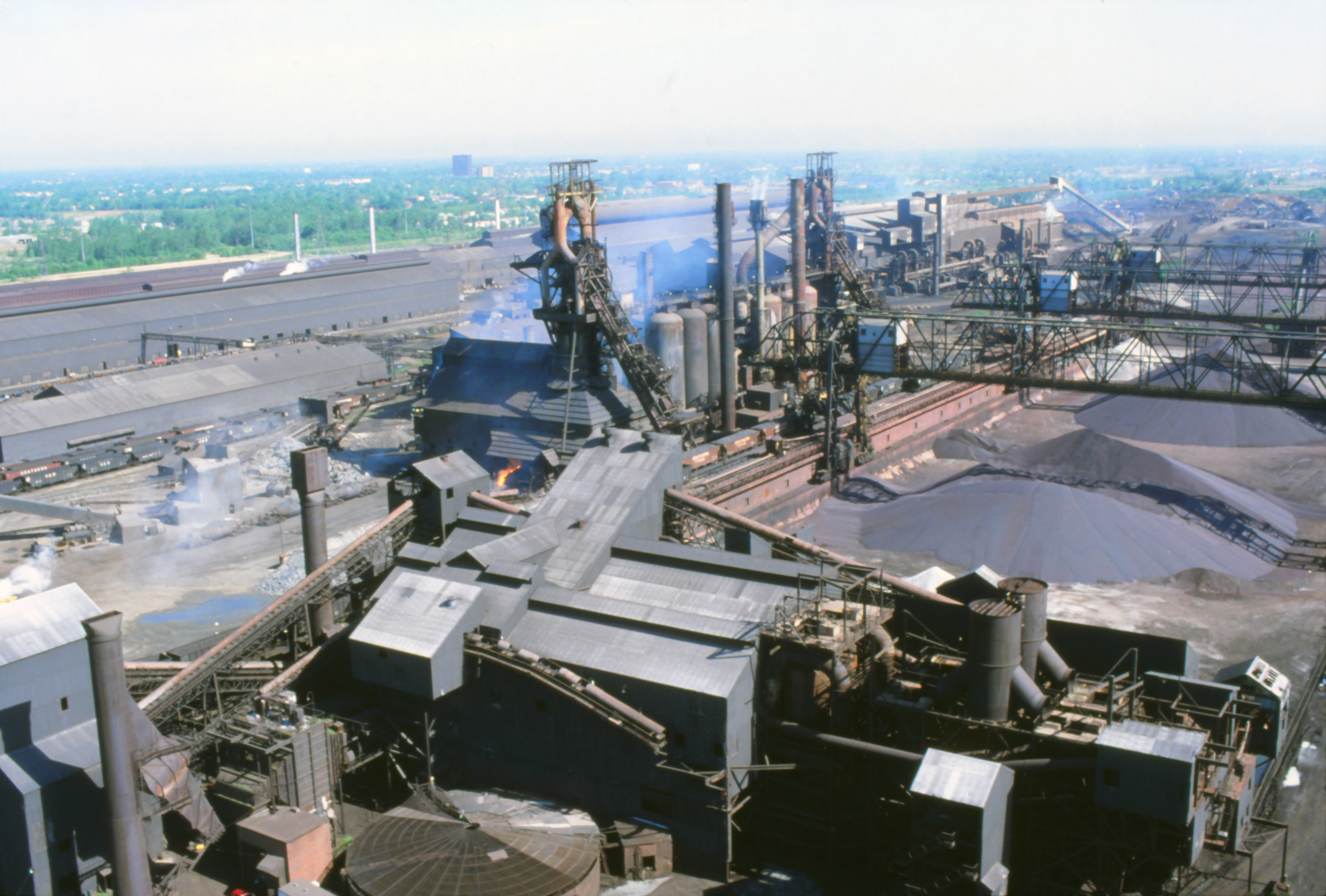
Aerial view of the McLouth Steel Plant in Trenton

In 1948, McLouth Steel purchased riverfront land along Jefferson Avenue to begin building its second complex. Between the land purchase and the buildout, the project cost more than $100 million and by 1949, the first ingots were poured at the site. By 1954, the Trenton Plant was dedicated and McLouth became able to produce iron as an integrated steel mill.

McLouth, the ninth largest steelmaker in the United States, was known both by the industry and its own slogan as a pioneer. It was the first in the United States to use the basic oxygen process, the first to have online computer control of steelmaking processes, the first to use a continuous caster in the United States, the first to cast 100% of its steel by continuous caster, and the first to use inductive slab heating.

Due to a high dependence on automotive customers, outdated and incorrectly sized equipment, union-management struggles, and economic downturns, McLouth underwent multiple bankruptcies and reorganizations in the 1980s and 1990s. McLouth ultimately shuttered for good in 1996, and with it, the Trenton Plant.

The plant was sold later that year to the Detroit Steel Company. Through the early 2000s, Detroit Steel primarily brought in outside steel, pickled it, and sold it. The plant's many failed startup attempts led to Wayne County's 2017 foreclosure on the site, after owners failed to pay $3.7 million in back taxes. MSC Land Co. purchased the land, entering into an agreement to demolish all buildings and perform some remediation. The proposed use for the land is an intermodal operation utilizing its port, rail lines, and proximity to freeways. The site was put on EPA's Superfund National Priorities List in May 2019.

Demolition and cleanup is currently being led by Crown Enterprises and overseen by the EPA and the Michigan Department of Environment, Great Lakes, and Energy (EGLE). All buildings are scheduled to be demolished by December 2020.

=== Beaumont Hospital ===
Seaway Hospital, now called Beaumont Hospital, opened up on Fort Street in 1961 as a community hospital in Trenton. Specialties there include diabetes and endocrinology, gastroenterology and GI surgery, geriatrics, nephrology, neurology and neurosurgery, orthopedics, pulmonology and urology.

=== Trenton Engine Plant ===
The Trenton Engine Plant is a Chrysler factory in Trenton, Michigan. The north factory opened in 1952 and underwent major expansion in 1969. Trenton Engine was the site chosen for production of the 2.2 L four-cylinder engine which debuted in 1980 in the K-cars. In 1985, the north factory underwent another expansion, and later in 2005, Daimler Chrysler reportedly invested $297 million in order to expand the Trenton Engine plant to prepare to build a new 4.0 L version of the SOHC V6 and to also revitalize the 3.8 line. The north factory stopped manufacturing engines in May 2011, and Chrysler announced that it would invest $114 million to repurpose one-fifth or nearly 400,000 square feet of the plant for the production of core components for the Pentastar V-6 engine. In November 2012, the company announced that it would invest an additional $40 million to add a flexible production line that can run both the Pentastar engine and the Tigershark (I-4) engine.

The south factory opened in 2010. Its current product is the 3.6L Pentastar V6 engine, and the 2.0L FCA Global Medium Engine L4 engine.

== Education ==
Trenton is served by Trenton Public Schools.

- Anderson Elementary School
- Hedke Elementary school
- Arthurs Middle School (formerly known as Monguagon Middle School)
- Trenton High School

A portion of Trenton, north of King Road, is in the Riverview Community School District.

St. Joseph Catholic School in Trenton opened in February 1948, with the school renovated in 1999.

=== Defunct school ===
Slocum Truax Junior High School was a former junior high school that resided in the present-day Slocum Truax Park in a neighborhood nearby downtown Trenton, which ended up closing in July 1979. In October 1980, the city of Trenton made an attempt to auction off the building and property, but the auction was canceled after the rear of the building was broken into and vandalized, according to the Trenton Times newspaper. The headstone of the building was nearly destroyed when the building was demolished in October 1980, but an effort by then-councilman William Muddiman rescued the piece from utter destruction, according to the Trenton Times. The headstone with the school's name that once hung above the entrance of the school currently rests at the front of the Slocum Truax Park. It is the last remaining piece of the former school.

Former elementary schools included Strohm School (1937-1980s), Owen School (1950s-2000s), Foley School (1950s-1980s), and Taylor School (1968-2000s).

== Culture ==
- Trenton features an active community revolving around sports. Its downtown area, along West Jefferson Avenue, features an annual craft fair the last weekend of June, called the Trenton Summer Festival.
- The recently remodeled Trenton Village Theatre is located in the downtown area Trenton Village Theatre | DYPAC. The art deco theater was designed by Charles N. Agree, who also created the Grande Ballroom in Detroit, among many others.
- Trenton operates the Bridge Cultural Center at 2427 West Road, a former farmhouse that now houses an array of yearly activities, including an annual Christmas fair and arts and crafts events.
- Trenton is home to the Wyandot Nation of Anderdon, one of four Wyandot communities in North America.

=== Festivals ===
Trenton has several festivals throughout the year:

- Roar on the River
- Taste of Trenton
- Country Christmas
- Somewhere in Time
- Trenton Summer Festival
- Scarecrow Festival
- Country on the River

=== In popular media ===
“The Laundromat” (2019)

== Sport ==
Trenton was the city of the Michigan Stars in the All-American Hockey League. They played their games at the Kennedy Ice Arena. The team folded during 1987-88 AAHL season after 14 games.

== Parks and recreation ==
The city recently spent $8.4 million to renovate the Kennedy Recreation Center, a 150,000-square-foot (14,000 m^{2}) complex along West Road that includes ice rinks, meeting rooms, and sports services, a sporting goods shop. The Teifer rink was originally an outdoor rink, which opened during Christmas week in 1961. The facility is home to the Trenton, Riverview, Grosse Ile, and Gibraltar Carlson High School hockey teams.

Adjacent is the Kennedy Outdoor Aquatic Center, a 13,000-square-foot (1,200 m^{2}) pool and water park that opened in 2005. The facility includes a 25-meter, 8-lane competitive pool with two diving boards, a 15-meter lap pool, a waterslide with separate splash area, and a 7,000-square-foot (650 m^{2}) leisure pool.

The city has 200 acres (0.81 km^{2}) of parks, including 22 operated by the city and 6 at schools. The city and Wayne County each also operate boat launches. The city of Trenton launch is located in Rotary Park, while the Wayne County launch is located at the south end of Elizabeth Park.

Along the Detroit River, Elizabeth Park, operated by Wayne County, is a popular destination for picnic-goers, fishermen, and boaters.

The city runs the Westfield Activities Center, which hosts meetings and houses the city's senior citizen program, the Teifer Building, and the Haas Park Building.

In the south of the city, is the Humbug Marsh Unit of the Detroit River International Wildlife Refuge. This unit of the refuge is shared between Trenton and Gibraltar to the south. The refuge features the last natural shoreline on the Detroit River as well as old growth forest, marshland, swamps and savanna. White-tailed deer, red fox, coyotes, beavers, muskrat, and river otters all live in the Humbug Marsh Unit. The park is an important migratory bird stop and bird watching has become a popular activity there. The park also features an information center, fishing pier, observation decks and picnic areas. Hiking, cross-country skiing, snowshoeing, bird watching, kayaking and fishing are all popular outdoor activities at the park, where there are many viewpoints of the Detroit River opening up to Lake Erie. The park consists of the mainland wetland and forest area as well as the small offshore island, Humbug Island, which contains old growth forest and bald eagle nesting sites.

== Notable people ==
- Steve Avery, former Atlanta Braves pitcher
- Zak Bagans, host and lead investigator of the Travel Channel's paranormal series Ghost Adventures
- Anthony Bass, professional baseball pitcher
- George H. W. Bush, the future U.S. president, who lived in Trenton with his wife Barbara while he was stationed at the Grosse Ile Naval Air Station
- Erik Condra, NHL ice hockey player
- Larry DePalma, former NHL player
- Donald M. Dickinson, U.S. postmaster general under President Grover Cleveland
- Christopher D. Dingell, state senator and judge
- Lady Mary Reford Gooderham (1863-1955), philanthropist
- Andy Greene, NHL player
- Deby LaPlante, retired track and field athlete
- Ann Marie Lipinski, journalist and former editor of the Chicago Tribune
- Gary Lowe, Michigan State and NFL defensive back
- Kevin Nash, professional wrestler and actor
- Lee Norwood, NHL player
- J. J. Putz, relief pitcher for the Arizona Diamondbacks
- Mary Lynn Rajskub, comedian and actress
- Mike Rucinski, ice hockey player
- Matt Shoemaker, starting pitcher for the Los Angeles Angels
- Bradley A. Smith, former Chairman of the Federal Election Commission (2000-2005).
