= Levi Barber =

American politician

Member of the U.S. House of Representatives from Ohio's 3rd district
- In office March 4, 1817 – March 3, 1819
- Preceded by: William Creighton, Jr.
- Succeeded by: Henry Brush
- In office March 4, 1821 – March 3, 1823
- Preceded by: Henry Brush
- Succeeded by: William McLean

Member of the Ohio House of Representatives
- In office 1806

Personal details
- Born: October 16, 1777 Simsbury, Connecticut
- Died: April 23, 1833 (aged 55) Harmar, Ohio
- Resting place: Harmar Cemetery
- Party: Democratic-Republican
- Spouse: Elizabeth Rouse

Levi Barber (October 16, 1777 – April 23, 1833) was a surveyor, court administrator, banker, and legislator who served two non-consecutive terms in the United States House Of Representatives in the early 19th century.

== Early life and career ==
Levi Barber was born in Simsbury, Connecticut, the son of David Barber and Sarah Lawrence. Levi moved to Ohio where he was a surveyor in the employ of the federal government. His name appears on early survey records in what later became Monroe County, Ohio. He also surveyed many other places in Ohio, for example his name is listed as the surveyor in 1802 in Bethel Township in Miami county, Ohio, according to the original source document.

On February 15, 1803, in Washington County, Ohio, Levi Barber married Elizabeth Rouse of Massachusetts. They had at least four children: David, Elizabeth, Austin and Levi, Jr. (Levi Barber, Jr., was a presidential elector from Ohio in 1868, casting his ballot for Ulysses S. Grant.)

He was appointed Washington County surveyor in November 1805 and served until July 1816. He was commissioned receiver of the United States land office in Marietta, Ohio, on April 1, 1807.

Levi Barber was elected from Washington County to the Ohio House of Representatives in 1806. He served as clerk of the Court of Common Pleas and the court of Washington County from 1809 until 1817, when he resigned to take his seat in Congress. He also served as a Justice of the Peace and performed civil marriages.

During the War of 1812, Levi Barber was an aide to Governor Return J. Meigs, Jr.

== Congress ==
Levi Barber was elected in 1816 as a Democratic-Republican from Ohio's 3rd congressional district to the Fifteenth United States Congress. He was unsuccessful in his 1818 bid for reelection. In 1819 Levi Barber was again elected from Washington and Athens counties to the Ohio legislature and held the certificate of election. But the seat was contested by Sardina Stone, who was seated. In 1820, he again ran and was elected to the Seventeenth United States Congress. But after that term, he was unsuccessful in his run for reelection in 1822.

== Later career and death ==
Levi Barber was appointed Trustee of Ohio University in Athens, Ohio in 1822 and served until his death. He was also the fourth president of the Bank of Marietta, the first bank chartered in Ohio.

Levi Barber died in Harmar, Ohio (now a part of Marietta) and was interred in Harmar Cemetery.

Ohio House of Representatives
New district	Representative from Washington, Gallia, Muskingum, and Athens Counties; 1806–1807; Served alongside: Lewis Cass, William H. Puthoff	Succeeded by John P. R. Bureau; John Matthews; James Palmer
U.S. House of Representatives
Preceded by William Creighton, Jr.	U.S. Representative from Ohio's 3rd district 1817–1819	Succeeded by Henry Brush
Preceded by Henry Brush	U.S. Representative from Ohio's 3rd district 1821–1823	Succeeded by William McLean
