= Trenton Channel Power Plant =

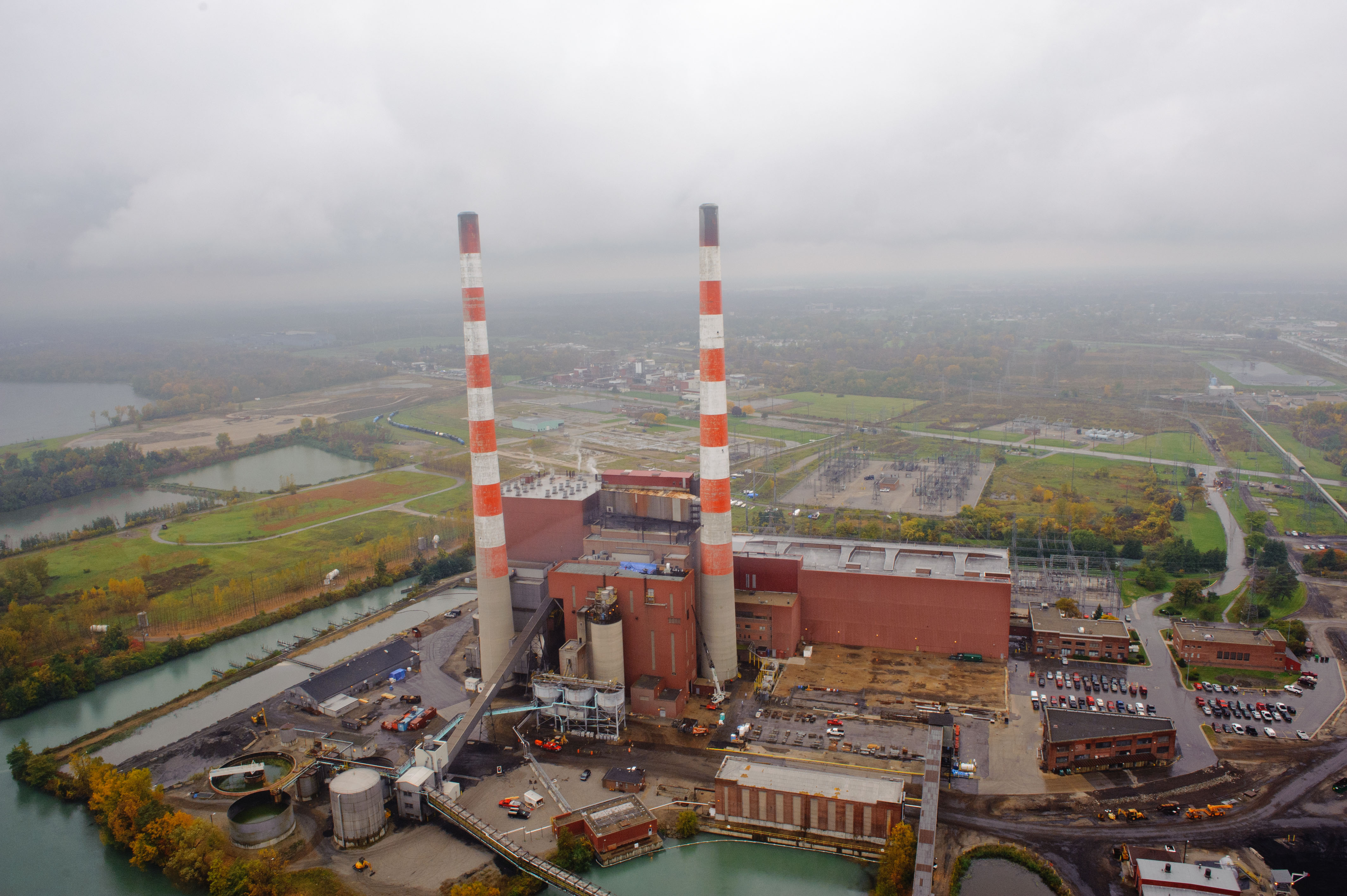
- View of the power plant from the Detroit River
- Country: United States
- Location: 4695 West Jefferson Avenue; Trenton, Michigan 48183
- Coordinates: 42°07′20″N 83°10′53″W
- Status: Retired and demolished
- Commission date: 1924
- Decommission date: December 2022
- Owner: Detroit Edison

Power generation
- Nameplate capacity: 535.5 MW; 775.5 MW

External links
- Commons: Related media on Commons

The Trenton Channel Power Plant, also known as the Trenton Stacks, was a coal-burning power station located in Trenton, Michigan. Completed in 1924, it is owned by Detroit Edison, a subsidiary of DTE Energy.

== Location ==
Part of the facility's property is on the mainland surrounding West Jefferson Avenue in southern Wayne County. The main building – the two-smokestack power station – and the coal yard are located on what is now technically the southern portion of Slocum's Island in the Detroit River. The facility shares this island with Elizabeth Park, which is separated from the facility by Grosse Ile Parkway. The Trenton Channel Power Station and the affiliated Sibley Quarry occupy 458 acres (185 ha) of land along the Detroit River, in which 225 acres (91 ha) of that property is open fields, woods, ponds, and sound berms.

== Environment ==
The characteristic striped smokestacks were constructed with an innovative “smokestack within a smokestack” design to reduce the level of pollutants released. However, to better achieve this, the inner smokestacks were lined with asbestos that had to be later removed at great cost.

The Trenton Channel Power Plant became ISO 14001 certified in 2001. The plant also donated money for a wildlife observation deck in the Humbug Marsh.

== History ==
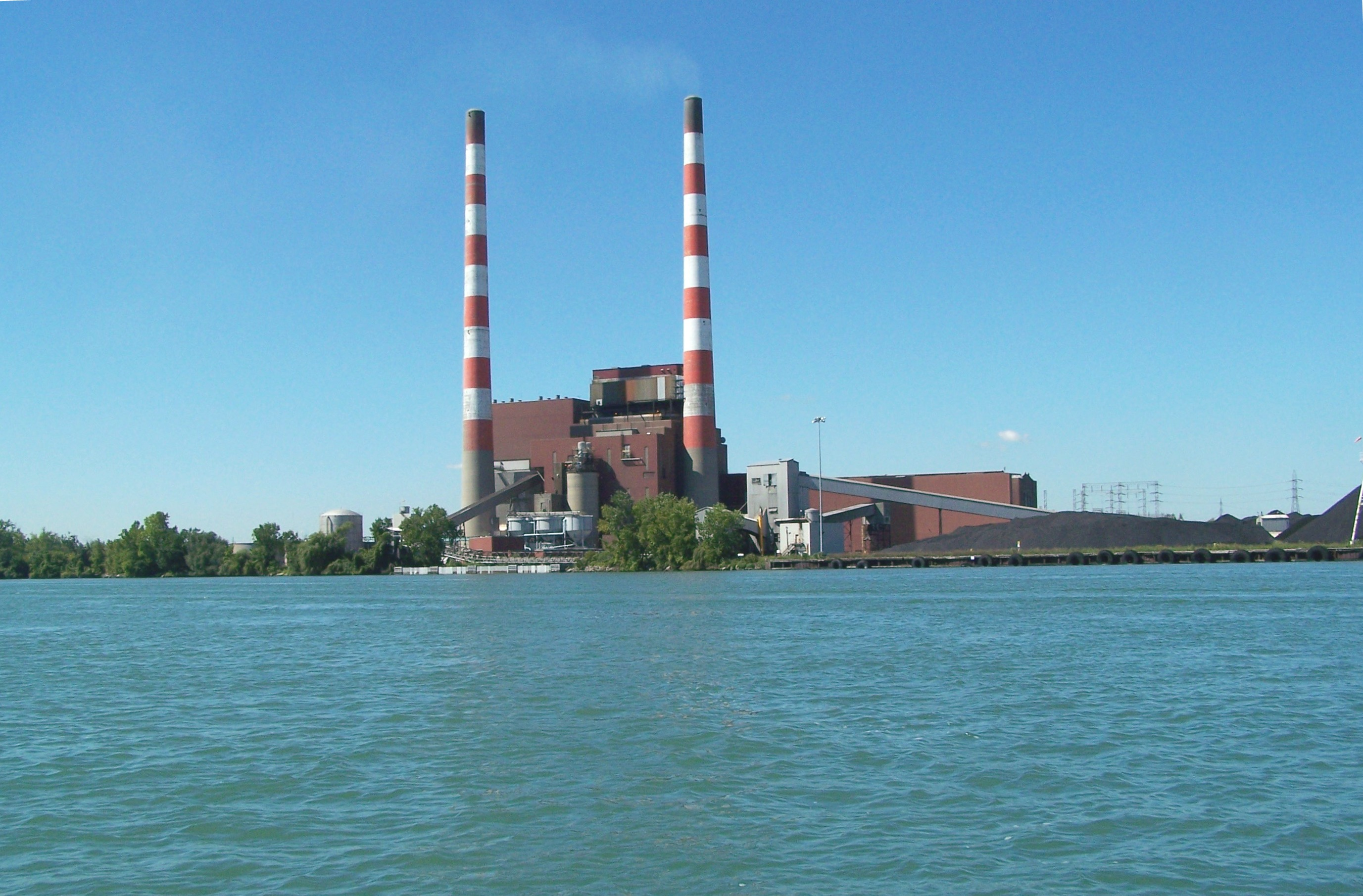
Trenton Channel power plant in 2007

The Trenton Channel Power Plant was first fired up in 1924. It had 6 turbine generators with 13 coal-fired boilers. There was space for 2 additional boilers, but they were never needed. Operating conditions were 750 °F (399 °C) and 420 psi (29,000 hPa). The sixth and last turbine generator arrived by 1929. Each unit produced a rated 50 megawatts of electricity. Five short smoke stacks exhausted gases from the boilers. These were the first Detroit Edison units to use pulverized coal rather than the older style stoker-fired beds of coal. They were also the first power plants in the US to use electrostatic precipitators to capture fly ash from the stacks. Electrostatic precipitators were, however, in use in other industries at the time.

In 1950, a second plant started up at the same site and adjoined the first plant. It had two turbine generators, #7 and #8, with a rating of 120 megawatts each. They were fed by a total of 4 boilers. The boilers ran at higher steam conditions than the first plant, at 950 °F (510 °C) and about 1,250 psi (86,000 hPa). Therefore, the first plant became known as the "low side", while the newer plant was known as the "high side". The high side was located to the south of the low side. Two short smoke stacks released gases from the four boilers.

Finally in 1968, Unit #9 was placed in service. It is a 550-megawatt turbine generator fed by a single boiler. It adjoins the high side plant and is located on the south side. Operating conditions are 1,000 °F (538 °C) and 2,520 psi (174,000 hPa). One 563-foot (172 m) smoke stack is used for this unit. Soon afterwards, another stack, identical to the #9 stack, was erected to replace the two short stacks on the high side plant. Both tall stacks remained in service as of 2012.

== Decommissioning and repurposing ==
By the mid-1970s, the low side plant was decommissioned and the boiler house was eventually demolished. In the 2010s, all generators except #9 were closed. In 2016, DTE announced its intention to close the plant as well as the St. Clair Power Plant by 2022 as it began to change to natural gas and renewable energy plants. The retirement of the Trenton and St. Clair plants began in the summer of 2022 and ended that December. Just before dawn on March 15, 2024, at approximately 7:00am EDT, DTE Energy demolished both smokestacks in a controlled demolition. The northernmost stack was demolished first, shortly before the southernmost stack. The demolition lasted less than a minute.

DTE began constructing a 4-hour 220 MW / 880 MWh battery storage power station at the site in June 2024. On June 21, 2024, the boiler house was demolished.

== See also ==
- List of power stations in Michigan
