= Ohio in the War of 1812 =

During the War of 1812, Ohio was on the front lines in the conflict between the United States, Great Britain, Canadians, and the Native American allies of each side. Fighting raged in the northeastern section of the state and on the adjacent Lake Erie.

== War of 1812 ==
Ohio figured prominently in pre-war discussions about war with Britain and Canada. Should war break out, a three-pronged attack would occur from the west, the center and the east into Canada. William Hull, the governor of the Michigan territory, who had traveled to Washington, D.C. in late 1811 for consultations, was appointed brigadier-general (in addition to his duties as territorial governor) and assigned the responsibilities of leading the North West Army to reinforce Detroit, protect Michigan, and coordinate with other expeditions. Hull's army gathered in April and May 1812, before the United States declared war on Great Britain. It was to consist of the Fourth Regiment, a regular U.S. Army unit based in Vincennes, Indiana, and three regiments of Ohio militia. These were the First Regiment of Ohio Volunteers, under Col. Duncan McArthur; the Second Regiment of Ohio Volunteers, under Col. James Findlay; and the Third Regiment, under Col. Lewis Cass. The Ohio volunteer units gathered around the small community of Dayton, with Col. McArthur's First Regiment south of Dayton (near the confluence of the Great Miami and Hole's Creek) and the other two regiments slightly north of town along the Mad River. On May 25, 1812, the regiments gathered together and Governor Return J. Meigs Jr. handed over command to Brigadier General Hull.

Ohio militia participating in the war were killed at two early battles of the war, the Battle of Brownstown (August 5, 1812), and the Battle of Maguaga (August 9, 1812).

In February, construction on Fort Meigs, next to the Maumee River in Perrysburg, Ohio, began. Gen. William Henry Harrison provided these orders. The fort would undergo two sieges. The first was in May. The British assaulted the fort, however, the Americans held the fort. The second siege was in July. Tecumseh, leading the Native American allies to the British, tried to ambush the Americans. However this did not work, and the British and Natives were forced to leave, letting the Americans win again. In September, the Battle of Lake Erie took place, with the Americans led by Oliver Hazard Perry. The British overpowered the Americans in strength and number of guns, but Perry forced the British to surrender by getting closer, as their guns were more powerful up close.

== Leaders ==
=== United States ===
- Brigadier General William Hull
- Col. Duncan McArthur
- Col. James Findlay
- Col. Lewis Cass

=== Great Britain ===
Major General Henry Procter

== See also ==
- Copus massacre
