= Thomas Van Horne =

American politician

Thomas B. Van Horne, (June 1, 1782 – September 21, 1841) served as a federal land register and Ohio State Senator. He is noted for his leadership during the War of 1812.

== Early life ==
Born in New Jersey June 1, 1782, his ancestors were emigrants from the Netherlands. He was the son of Rev. William Van Horne, a Baptist clergyman, who served as chaplain in the American Revolutionary War. The Reverend Van Horn died in 1807, at Pittsburgh, on his journey to Ohio. Thomas continued westward and settled in Warren County, Ohio, one mile east of Lebanon in December of that same year. he engaged in the arduous labors of opening a farm in the forests of that location, and it remained his home for the rest of his life.

== Military career ==
An early volunteer in the Ohio State Militia, during the War of 1812, he first served as state adjutant.

He was elected a major and placed in command of a battalion of Colonel James Findley's Second Ohio Regiment of Volunteer Militia, with the rank of major. Findley was a career politician, who had been a member of the Ohio Territorial legislature and twice mayor of Cincinnati. He was in command of American forces at the Battle of Brownstown in the Territory of Michigan on August 5, 1812, where his troops retreated in disarray, and was part of the forces at the Battle of Maguaga Creek on August 9, 1812, where American troops were unsuccessful in re-opening their supply lines to Detroit. He was surrendered by General William Hull and was surrendered with General Hull's army at Detroit. He was soon exchanged, and received a commission as lieutenant colonel in the regular army, in which capacity he continued until the close of the war, being for a long time in command of Fort Erie.

== Political career ==
At the close of the war, he returned to agricultural pursuits. He was elected a senator in the Legislature of Ohio in 1812, 1816 and 1817, and was afterward appointed, by President James Monroe, a register of the Land Office in the northwestern part of Ohio, which position he held until 1837. On returning from this position, he again established himself on his farm near Lebanon, where he remained until his death, with a reputation as a quiet, sober, industrious and useful citizen. He died September 21, 1841, in the fifty-ninth year of his age, and was buried at Lebanon, Ohio.
