= John M. Goodenow =

American politician (1782–1838)

John Milton Goodenow

Member of the U.S. House of Representatives from Ohio's 11th district
- In office March 4, 1829 – April 9, 1830
- Preceded by: John C. Wright
- Succeeded by: Humphrey H. Leavitt

Justice of the Supreme Court of Ohio
- In office February 1, 1830 – May 7, 1830
- Preceded by: Gustavus Swan
- Succeeded by: Henry Brush

Member of the Ohio House of Representatives from the Jefferson County district
- In office December 1, 1823 – December 5, 1824 Serving with William Lowery
- Preceded by: Jere H. Halleck, James Wilson, Samuel McNary
- Succeeded by: William Hamilton, William Lowery

Personal details
- Born: 1782 Westmoreland, New Hampshire
- Died: July 20, 1838 (aged 55–56) Cincinnati, Ohio, U.S.
- Resting place: Spring Grove Cemetery, Cincinnati
- Party: Jacksonian
- Spouse(s): Jane Waters, Sarah Lucy Wright Campbell
- Children: Lucy, Angela Jane, Lucia

John Milton Goodenow (1782 – July 20, 1838) was an American lawyer and politician who served one year as a U.S. representative from Ohio from 1829 to 1830.

== Biography ==
Born in Westmoreland, New Hampshire, Goodenow attended the public schools. He engaged in mercantile pursuits. He studied law. He was admitted to the bar and commenced practice in Steubenville, Ohio, in 1813.

=== Early political career ===
He was appointed collector of direct taxes and internal duties for the sixth collection district of Ohio in 1817. He served as member of the State house of representatives in 1823.

He served the Freemasons as Grand Master of the Grand Lodge of Ohio in 1827.

=== Congress ===
Goodenow was elected as a Jacksonian to the Twenty-first Congress and served from March 4, 1829, until April 9, 1830, when he resigned, having been chosen a judge of the Supreme Court of Ohio. He resigned in the summer of 1830 on account of ill health. He moved to Cincinnati in 1832.

An Ohio Presidential elector in 1832 for Andrew Jackson, he was appointed presiding judge of the court of common pleas in 1833.

=== Death and burial ===
He died in Cincinnati, July 20, 1838. He was interred in Spring Grove Cemetery, Cincinnati.

== Publications ==
- Goodenow, John (1819). Historical Sketches of the Principles and Maxims of American Jurisprudence: In Contrast with the Doctrines of the English Common Law on the Subject of Crimes and Punishment. Steubenville, Ohio: James Wilson. OCLC 4343241. - "was the first important commentary on the status of the English common law in America", and "is an important resource for legal historians studying the development of American jurisprudence.", though only 100 copies were printed.

== Notes ==
U.S. House of Representatives
Preceded by John C. Wright	Member of the U.S. House of Representatives from Ohio's 11th congressional district 1829–1830	Succeeded by Humphrey H. Leavitt
