= John C. Wright (Ohio politician) =

American politician

John Crafts Wright
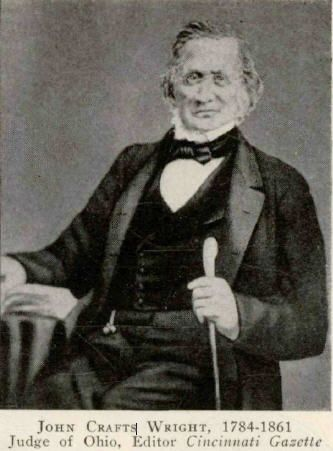

Member of the U.S. House of Representatives from Ohio's 11th district
- In office March 4, 1823 – March 3, 1829
- Preceded by: none (new district)
- Succeeded by: John M. Goodenow

Justice of the Ohio Supreme Court
- In office January 1831 – February 2, 1835
- Preceded by: Henry Brush
- Succeeded by: Peter Hitchcock

Personal details
- Born: August 17, 1783 Wethersfield, Connecticut
- Died: February 13, 1861 (aged 77) Washington, D.C., U.S.
- Resting place: Spring Grove Cemetery
- Party: Democratic-Republican; National Republican
- Spouse: Mary Buell Collier
- Children: four
- Education: Litchfield Law School

John Crafts Wright (August 17, 1783 – February 13, 1861) was a U.S. representative from Ohio and a journalist. He was the brother-in-law of Benjamin Tappan, U.S. senator from Ohio from 1839 to 1845.

Born in Wethersfield, Connecticut, Wright completed preparatory studies and then learned the trade of printer. He moved to Troy, New York, and edited the Troy Gazette for several years. He studied law at Litchfield Law School. He was admitted to the bar and commenced practice in Steubenville, Ohio, in 1809. United States district attorney in 1817.

Wright was elected to the Seventeenth Congress, but resigned on March 3, 1821, before the beginning of the congressional term. Elected again to the Eighteenth Congress, he began his service in that body as a National Republican, and continued to serve in the Nineteenth, and Twentieth Congresses, his three terms running from March 4, 1823, through March 4, 1829. He was an unsuccessful candidate for reelection in 1828 to the Twenty-first Congress.

Wright was elected to the Ohio Supreme Court in 1831 and served until February 2, 1835, when he resigned. In 1833, Wright, along with Edward King and Timothy Walker, founded the Cincinnati Law School, the first law school in the West. He moved to Cincinnati in 1835 and engaged in newspaper work, and for thirteen years published the Cincinnati Gazette. He served as director of the Cincinnati, Hamilton and Dayton Railroad. He served as delegate to and honorary president of the Peace Conference of 1861 held in Washington, D.C., in an effort to devise means to prevent the impending war, and died while serving in that capacity at Washington on February 13, 1861. He was interred in Spring Grove Cemetery, Cincinnati, Ohio.

Wright married Mary Buell Collier on August 22, 1805. They raised four children.

== Notes ==
U.S. House of Representatives
| Preceded by District created | Member of the U.S. House of Representatives from Ohio's 11th congressional district 1823–1829 | Succeeded by John M. Goodenow |
