= Steckel mill =

A Steckel mill is also known as a reversible finishing mill, is similar to a reversing rolling mill except two coilers are used to feed the material through the mill. One coiler is on the entrance side and the other on the exit side. The coilers pull the material through the mill, therefore the process is more similar to drawing than rolling. The material is fed back and forth through the mill until the desired thickness is reached, much like a reversing rolling mill.

It is also used to process steel slabs into hot rolled coil. The Steckel mill allows the rolling of a large slab by providing heated reels on both sides of the mill to store the increased length produced during rolling. These drums allow for additional heat retention and thermal consistency in the rolled piece, which in turn produces improved uniformity throughout the rolled product. A furnace is provided in both sides of the mill, which covers the mandrels each in one side upon which the slab is rolled after every complete pass. Output from Steckel mill varies from 1 to 2 mm. A cutter mechanism is also provided in this mill to cut the irregular head and tail of the incoming slab.

In the Steckel mill, several passes have to be taken to get the desired reduction. The Steckel mill has quality problems due to temperature losses. The rate of production in a Steckel mill is lower than a tandem mill.
