= Battle of Brownstown =

Skirmish in the War of 1812

Coordinates: 42.0944170°N 83.1991678°W

- Part of the War of 1812 and Tecumseh's War
Date	August 5, 1812
Location	Brownstown Township, Michigan
Result	Tecumseh Confederate victory

Belligerents
Tecumseh's Confederacy; Essex Militia	United States

Commanders and leaders
Tecumseh	Major Thomas Van Horne

Strength
25 warriors	200 Ohio militiamen

Casualties and losses
1 killed	18 killed 12 wounded 70 temporarily missing

The Battle of Brownstown was an early skirmish in the War of 1812. Although the United States military outnumbered the forces of Tecumseh's Confederacy 8 to 1, they lost the engagement and suffered substantial losses while Tecumseh's forces were almost completely untouched.

The skirmish occurred near Brownstown, a Wyandot village south of Fort Detroit on Brownstown creek. Brownstown was also known as "Sindathon's Village". Carlson High School in Gibraltar, Michigan, is near the site of the battle.

== Background ==
Assisted by the British, the Mingo, Wyandotte, Miami, Delaware, Shawnee, Kickapoo, Sauk, Ottawa, Ojibwe, Potawatomi, Mohawk and Chickamauga joined an alliance in 1783 against the United States of America. The alliance was originally formed at the Sandusky villages of the Wyandot, but after those villages were destroyed, the council fire was moved to Brownstown. Walk-in-the-Water and seven other Wyandot chiefs petitioned the U.S. on February 5, 1812, and obtained a 50-year possession of Brownstown and Monguagon; he lived at Brownstown and commanded the Wyandot warriors.

On August 5, 1812, Major Thomas Van Horne and the 200 U.S. soldiers were en route south to the River Raisin, where they were to pick up cattle and other needed supplies and escort them back to Fort Detroit for the use of Brigadier General William Hull. Hull was, at the time, in the Canadian village of Sandwich, now known as Windsor, Ontario, although he would abandon his position there and return to Detroit on August 8.

== Battle ==
Location of the battle

As the U.S. Forces forded Brownstown creek, the 200 U.S. soldiers were set upon by two dozen Native Americans led by the Shawnee war chief Tecumseh, Chickamauga war chief Daimee, Wyandot chief Roundhead, as well as a detachment from the Essex Militia. Faced with such opposition, Van Horne ordered a retreat, whereupon the untrained American militia scattered in a panic. Van Horne was able to save only half of his command; 18 men were killed, 12 were wounded, and 70 went missing. Most of those listed as "missing" were dispersed during the battle and returned to Detroit during the ensuing days.

== Aftermath ==
Josiah Snelling, known colloquially as the Prairie Chicken, was cited for gallantry for his actions during the Battle of Brownstown, and promoted to Major. Later, after Hull surrendered Fort Detroit to Tecumseh, Snelling's testimony was used at Hull's court-martial.

One minor chief, Blue Jacket, died in the battle. This was not the famous Shawnee chief Blue Jacket, but most likely was one of his sons.

Two active battalions of the Regular Army (1-5 Inf and 2-5 Inf) perpetuate the lineage of the old 4th Infantry, elements of which were present at the Battle of Brownstown.

The Essex Militia are perpetuated in the Canadian Army by the Essex and Kent Scottish.

By an act of the United States Congress on June 1, 1813, the widows of those men killed in the battle were awarded half pay for five years. In at least one case, that of Jacob Pence, $953.43 was paid in October 1832 and $422.53 in April, 1839, for a total of $1,375.96.
