= Battle of Maguaga =

Battle in the War of 1812

Coordinates: 42.13609°N 83.18285°W

- Part of the War of 1812
Date	9 August 1812
Location	Monguagon, Michigan
Result	Inconclusive

Belligerents
United Kingdom; Upper Canada Native Americans	United States

Commanders and leaders
Adam Muir	James Miller

Strength
75 regulars, 70 natives, 60 militia	300 regulars 200 riflemen (Ohio militiamen); 60 Michigan legion 40 dragoons and mounted spies

Casualties and losses
6 killed, 21 wounded, 2 captured	18 killed, 64 wounded

The Battle of Maguaga (also known as the Battle of Monguagon or the Battle of the Oakwoods) was a small battle between British troops, Canadian militia and Tecumseh's natives and a larger force of American troops near the Wyandot village of Maguaga in what is now the city of Riverview, Michigan.

== Background ==
In the early days of the War of 1812, an American army under Brigadier-General William Hull had moved to Detroit, intending to use it as a base for an attack on Upper Canada. Hull's resolution quickly faded. After deciding not to attack the British at Fort Amherstburg, he learned that Mackinac Island had been captured by the British and feared that many Indians would flock south from there to join the British. On 3 August, he retreated to American territory.

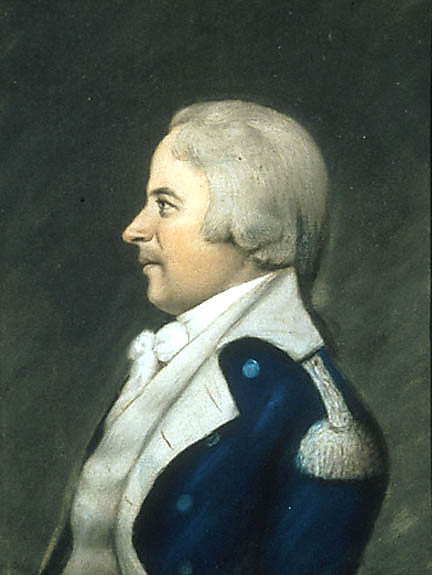
Brig Gen William Hull sent a large detachment to escort a supply train back to Fort Detroit, after the initial detachment which was sent was defeated by British and First Nations troops.

At the Miami Rapids, Captain Henry Brush's company of Ohio Volunteers were waiting with vital supplies for Hull's garrison, including 300 head of cattle and 70 packhorses each laden with 200 pounds of flour. On 4 August, British troops under Captain (local Major) Adam Muir of the 41st Regiment and Indians under Tecumseh and Roundhead defeated a detachment which Hull had sent to collect these supplies at the Battle of Brownstown. Hull sent a larger detachment under Lieutenant-Colonel James Miller to escort the supply train back to Detroit.

== The battle ==
At Monguagon, Miller's command, comprising 280 regulars and more than 330 Ohio Volunteer troops, found their path barred by Adam Muir, with 205 British regulars, Canadian militia and Native American. As the Americans advanced into a heavy fire, things started to go wrong for the British. The Canadian author John Richardson was present as a volunteer and later wrote:

Here it was that we first had an opportunity of perceiving the extreme disadvantage of opposing regular troops to the enemy in the woods. Accustomed to the use of the rifle from his infancy ... and possessing the advantage of a dress which renders him almost undistinguishable to the eye of an European, the American marksman enters with comparative security into a contest with the English soldier whose glaring habiliment and accoutrements are objects too conspicuous to be missed, while his utter ignorance of a mode of warfare, in which courage and discipline are of no avail, renders the struggle for mastery even more unequal.

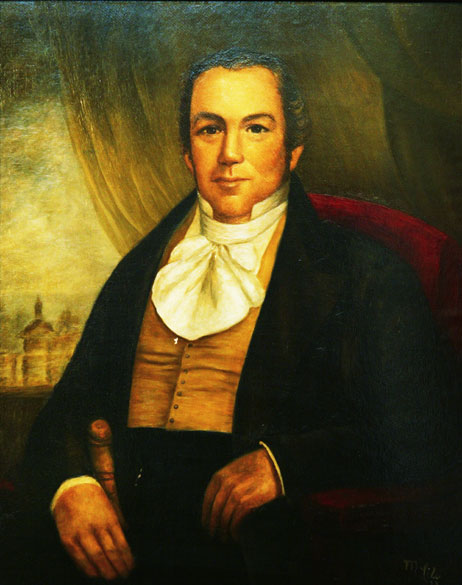
Lt Col James Miller commanded American forces at Maguaga.

Noticing some men creeping through the woods on their right, some of the redcoats thought it was the enemy trying to outflank them and opened fire on them. The "enemy" turned out to be Potawatomi warriors allied to the British under Chief Main Poc, who immediately thought that the people firing at them must be Americans. Briton and Native American blazed away at each other until the Potawatomi realized that they were fighting their own side and withdrew into the woods to the rear.

Meanwhile, seeing the American advance waver, Muir ordered the bugler of the light company of the 41st Regiment to sound the charge. In the British Army, only the light infantry used the bugle; the rest of the infantry communicated using drumbeats. The officer commanding one of the other companies of the 41st Regiment thought that the bugle was sounding the "recall" and ordered his men to fall back. Before Muir knew what was happening, his whole force was streaming off to the rear. The Americans, who thought that the British were running from them, took heart and advanced over Muir's vacated position in pursuit of an enemy they thought they had routed. Miller advanced a good distance only to find that Muir had rallied his men and was standing, awaiting another attack. Miller, satisfied with his "victory", decided not to renew his assault.

Miller's force had suffered 18 killed and 64 wounded. Muir recorded 3 killed, 13 wounded and 2 missing from the 41st Regiment; 1 killed and 2 wounded from the Canadian Militia and 2 killed and 6 wounded from the Native American contingent. The 2 men returned as "missing" were taken prisoner. The Americans later claimed to have taken thirty Indian scalps at the battle.

At this point, Colonel Miller's nerve seems to have gone. His men had discarded their knapsacks at the beginning of the battle so that they could fight more effectively. Now, Miller refused to go back into the woods to retrieve the knapsacks in case the enemy were waiting there to ambush him. He camped in a large clearing and the next morning, he refused to continue the advance to the Rapids. Miller may have been shaken by the comparatively heavy casualties that his command had suffered. He clearly did not fancy another encounter with Muir. He was also very ill, and almost in a state of collapse.

Unknown to Miller, Muir's detachment had long since retired to their boats and sailed back to Fort Malden, Amherstburg. For two days, Miller stayed bivouacked, ignoring repeated orders from Hull to resume his advance to the Rapids. Finally, Hull realized that Miller was not going to obey him, and ordered him to return to Detroit.

== Aftermath ==
The Battle of Monguagon was characterized by a series of errors by both sides.

The British routed themselves thanks to two misunderstandings, at least one of which could have been avoided through better training. The 41st Regiment had been stated to be "very sharp", but this probably indicated that their standards of discipline, administration and parade-ground drill were good. Like most British regiments, they were not trained in light infantry tactics or "bush warfare" (except for the Light company, and possibly the Grenadier company which was not present at Maguaga.)

Colonel Miller first wasted the tactical advantage that was given to him by the confusion within the British force, and then appears to have completely lost his nerve. James Miller's War of 1812 career ended in success and promotion to brigadier-general, thanks mainly to his capture of the British batteries at the Battle of Lundy's Lane. Nevertheless, in the wake of the Battle of Monguagon, he may have been fortunate to escape being court-martialled and cashiered.

Miller's failure might have had dire consequences for the garrison of Detroit in the event of a sustained siege, when the supplies from the Miami Rapids would have been needed. In the event, Detroit surrendered to General Brock after a siege of only a few hours, so the absence of the extra food supplies was irrelevant. The only difference that the failure of Miller's expedition might have made was that Captain Brush's company and their supplies were not in Detroit to be captured. However, the terms of capitulation signed by General Hull included the garrison at the Rapids in the surrender agreement, and the British got the supplies anyway.

Monguagon was the first encounter of the War of 1812 that was big enough to be called a "battle" even by the standards of this small-scale conflict.

Three active battalions of the current 3rd Infantry (1-3 Inf, 2-3 Inf and 4-3 Inf) perpetuate the lineage of the old 1st Infantry Regiment, which had a detachment at the Battle of Maguaga.
