= Berlin Charter Township, Michigan =

Berlin Township, Michigan
- Charter township
- Berlin Charter Township
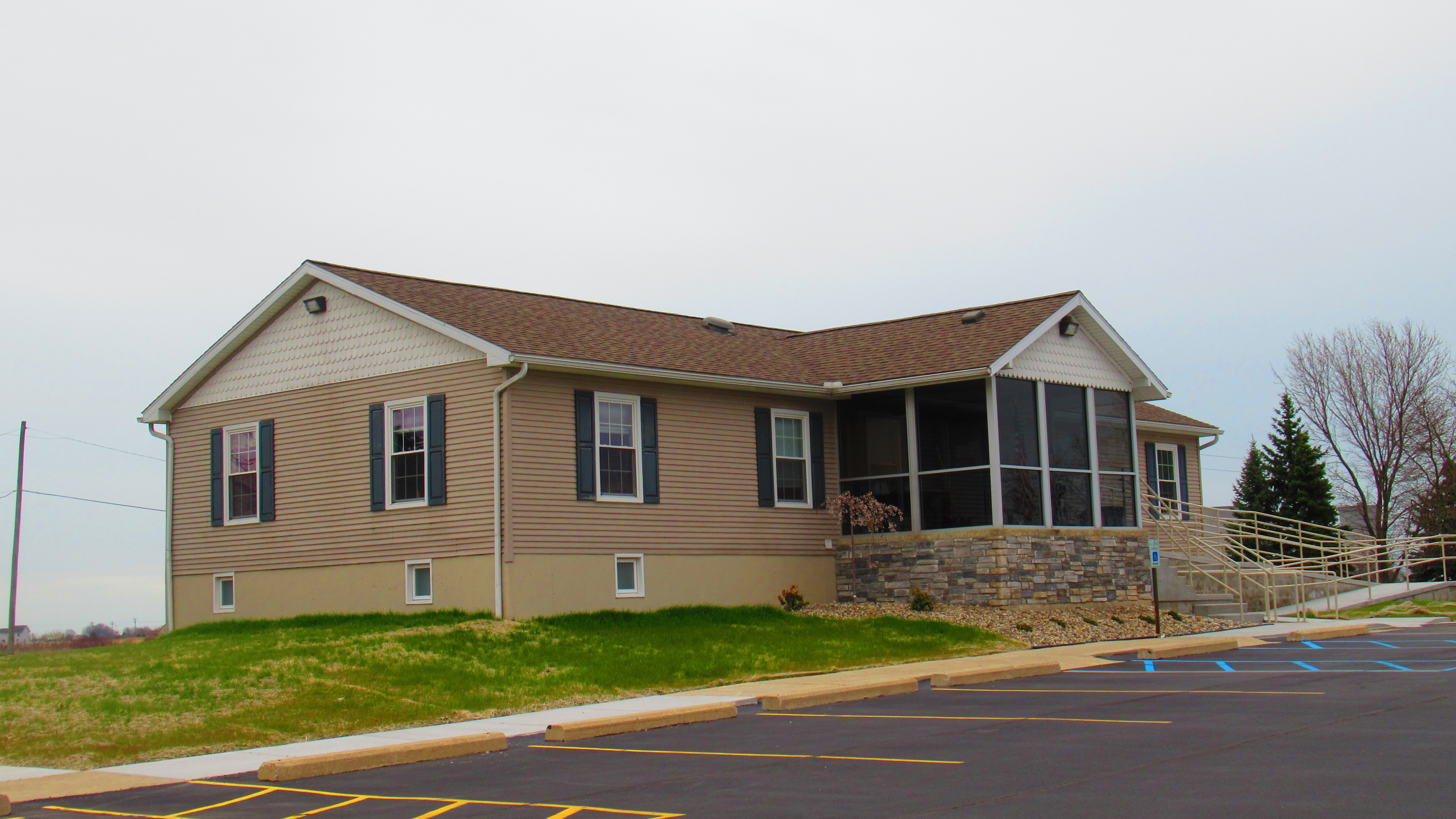
- Berlin Township Office

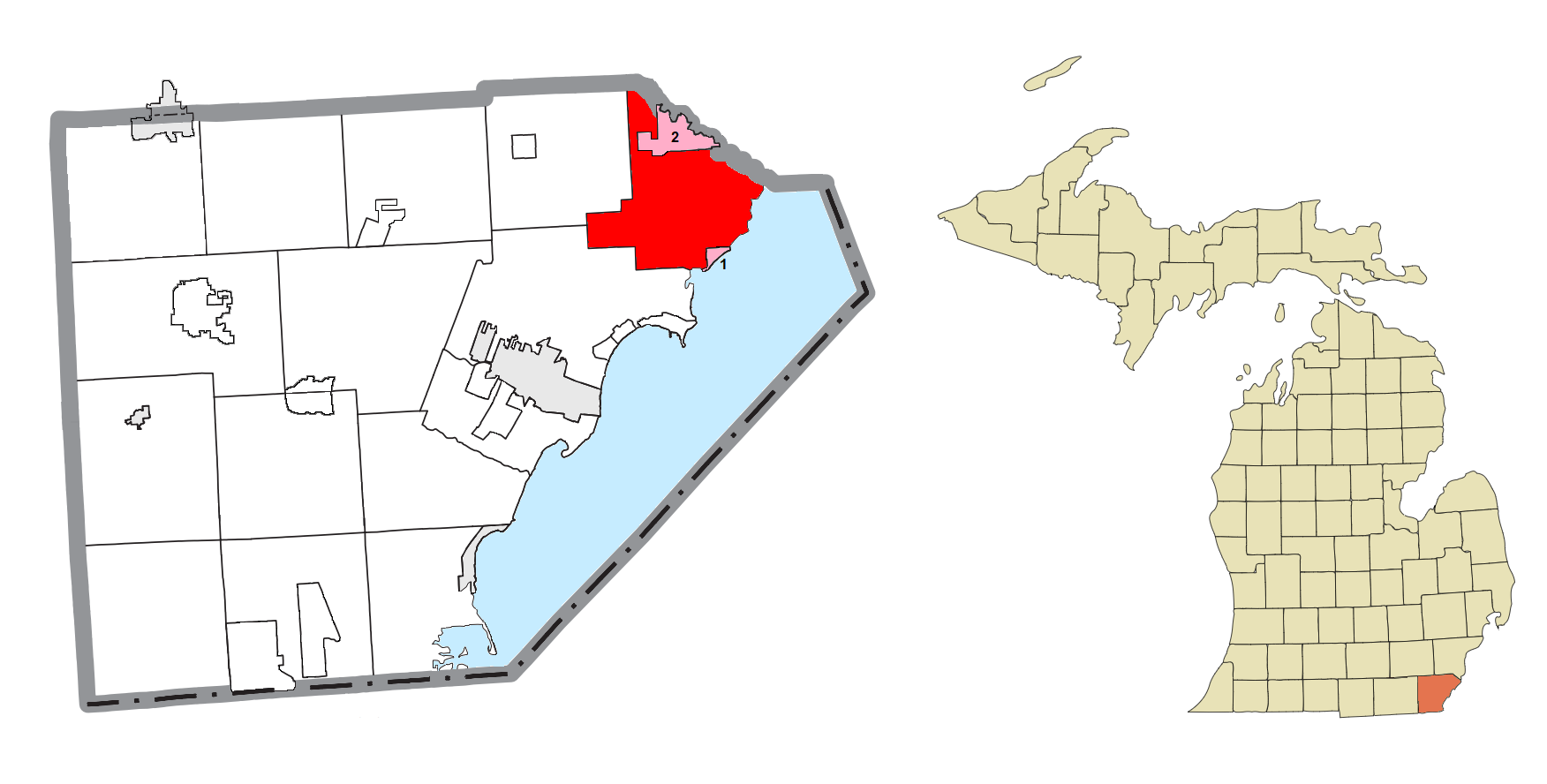
- Left: Location within Monroe County and the administered villages of Estral Beach (1) and South Rockwood (2); Right: Location in the state of Michigan

- Location within Michigan Location within the United States
- Coordinates: 42°01′51″N 83°16′09″W
- Country: United States
- State: Michigan
- County: Monroe
- Organized: 1867

Government
  - Supervisor: Dave Reaume
  - Clerk: Denise Sovey-Meyer

Area
  - Total: 37.03 sq mi (95.9 km^{2})
  - Land: 32.01 sq mi (82.9 km^{2})
  - Water: 5.02 sq mi (13.0 km^{2})
- Elevation: 587 ft (179 m)

Population (2020)
  - Total: 9,890
  - Density: 308.9/sq mi (119.3/km^{2})
- Time zone: UTC-5 (Eastern (EST))
  - Summer (DST): UTC-4 (EDT)
- ZIP Codes: 48166 (Newport); 48179 (South Rockwood); 48134 (Flat Rock)
- Area code: 734
- FIPS code: 26-115-07720
- GNIS feature ID: 1625924
- Website: www.berlinchartertwp.com

Berlin Charter Township is a charter township of Monroe County in the U.S. state of Michigan. At the 2020 census, the township population was 9,890.

The township was organized in 1867 from the eastern portion of Ash Township. As part of the Monroe Metropolitan Area, the township is also included as part of the much larger Metro Detroit region.

== Communities ==
- Estral Beach is a village in the southeasternmost portion of the township along Lake Erie. As a village, Estral Beach has some autonomy but is still under the administration of the township. The population of the village was 403 at the 2020 census.
- Newport is an unincorporated community centered at 42°00′08″N 83°18′31″W in the southwest portion of the township. As an unincorporated area, Newport has no legal boundaries or demographic statistics of its own. Newport contains its own post office with the 48166 ZIP Code, and locations in the southern part of Berlin Charter Township use Newport as a mailing address. The areas included in the Newport ZIP Code extend into Frenchtown Charter Township to the south and also includes the Enrico Fermi Nuclear Generating Station.
- Oldport (or Old Port) is an unincorporated community located at the intersection of North Dixie Highway and Swan Creek Road at 42°04′53″N 83°34′51″W. It was first settled as early as 1830 and was originally called "Newport". When a railway station named Newport opened to the west, this community adopted the name Oldport.
- South Rockwood is a village located in the northern portion of the township along the border of Wayne County, adjacent to the city of Rockwood. South Rockwood contains its own post office with the 48179 ZIP Code. The population of the village was 1,587 at the 2020 census.

== Geography ==
Berlin Charter Township is in the northeast corner of Monroe County and is bordered on the south by Frenchtown Township and by Ash Township on the west. The Huron River forms most of the northern border of the township with Brownstown Township and the cities of Rockwood and Flat Rock in Wayne County.

According to the U.S. Census Bureau, the township has a total area of 37.03 square miles (95.91 km^{2}), of which 32.01 square miles (82.9 km^{2}) are land and 5.02 square miles (13.0 km^{2}), or 13.56%, are water.

Portions of the Pointe Mouillee State Game Area are located within Berlin Township. The township contains two listings on the National Register of Historic Places. The Detroit River Light is within the township's water boundaries just south of the mouth of the Detroit River. The Jefferson Avenue–Huron River Bridge crosses the Huron River, connecting Berlin Township to Brownstown Township along the U.S. Turnpike to Jefferson Avenue. It is one of the few listings on the National Register of Historic Places to span multiple counties.

== Demographics ==
Historical population
Census	Pop.	Note	%±
1870	1,844		—
1880	2,246		21.8%
1890	1,906		−15.1%
1900	1,820		−4.5%
1910	1,687		−7.3%
1920	1,657		−1.8%
1930	2,259		36.3%
1940	2,692		19.2%
1950	3,559		32.2%
1960	4,459		25.3%
1970	5,510		23.6%
1980	6,488		17.7%
1990	6,286		−3.1%
2000	6,924		10.1%
2010	9,299		34.3%
2020	9,890		6.4%
U.S. Decennial Census

As of the census of 2000, there were 6,924 people, 2,511 households, and 1,923 families residing in the township. The population density was 215.8 inhabitants per square mile (83.3/km^{2}). There were 2,654 housing units at an average density of 82.7 per square mile (31.9/km^{2}). The racial makeup of the township was 97.11% White, 0.49% African American, 0.33% Native American, 0.07% Asian, 0.01% Pacific Islander, 0.58% from other races, and 1.40% from two or more races. Hispanic or Latino of any race were 1.43% of the population.

There were 2,511 households, out of which 35.5% had children under the age of 18 living with them, 64.7% were married couples living together, 7.9% had a female householder with no husband present, and 23.4% were non-families. 18.3% of all households were made up of individuals, and 5.1% had someone living alone who was 65 years of age or older. The average household size was 2.76 and the average family size was 3.15.

In the township the population was spread out, with 26.6% under the age of 18, 8.4% from 18 to 24, 30.1% from 25 to 44, 26.4% from 45 to 64, and 8.5% who were 65 years of age or older. The median age was 36 years. For every 100 females, there were 106.9 males. For every 100 females age 18 and over, there were 105.6 males.

The median income for a household in the township was $57,403, and the median income for a family was $64,071. Males had a median income of $48,431 versus $27,568 for females. The per capita income for the township was $23,898. About 2.9% of families and 5.6% of the population were below the poverty line, including 7.6% of those under age 18 and 5.6% of those age 65 or over.

== Education ==
The southeastern portion of the township is served by Jefferson Schools, while the northwest portion of the township is served by Airport Community Schools. A very small northwesternmost portion of the township is served by Flat Rock Community Schools.

== Highways ==
- I-75
- I-275
- US 24
- US 25 (decommissioned) – currently follows the route of present-day U.S. Route 24

== Images ==
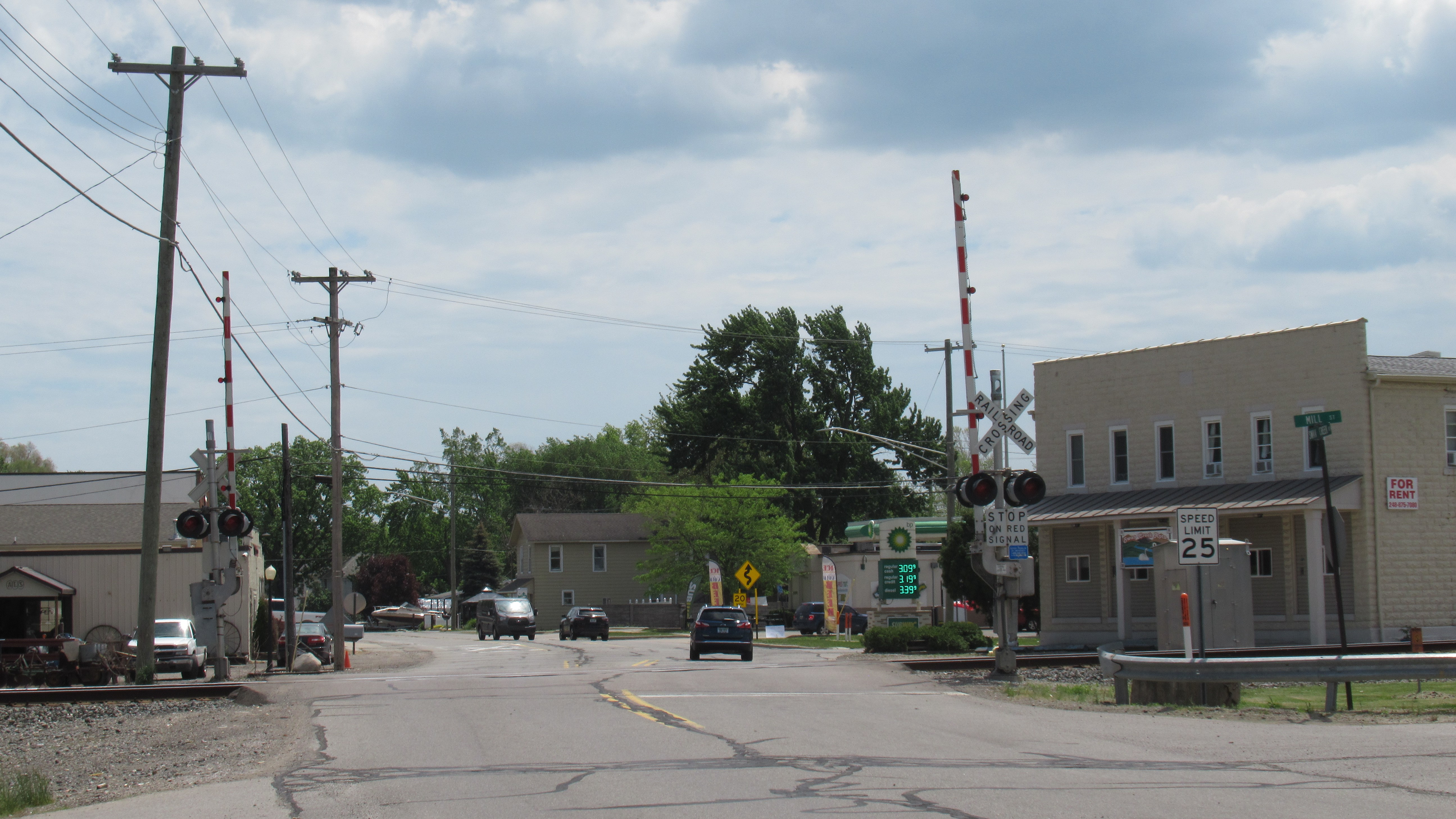
The community of Newport

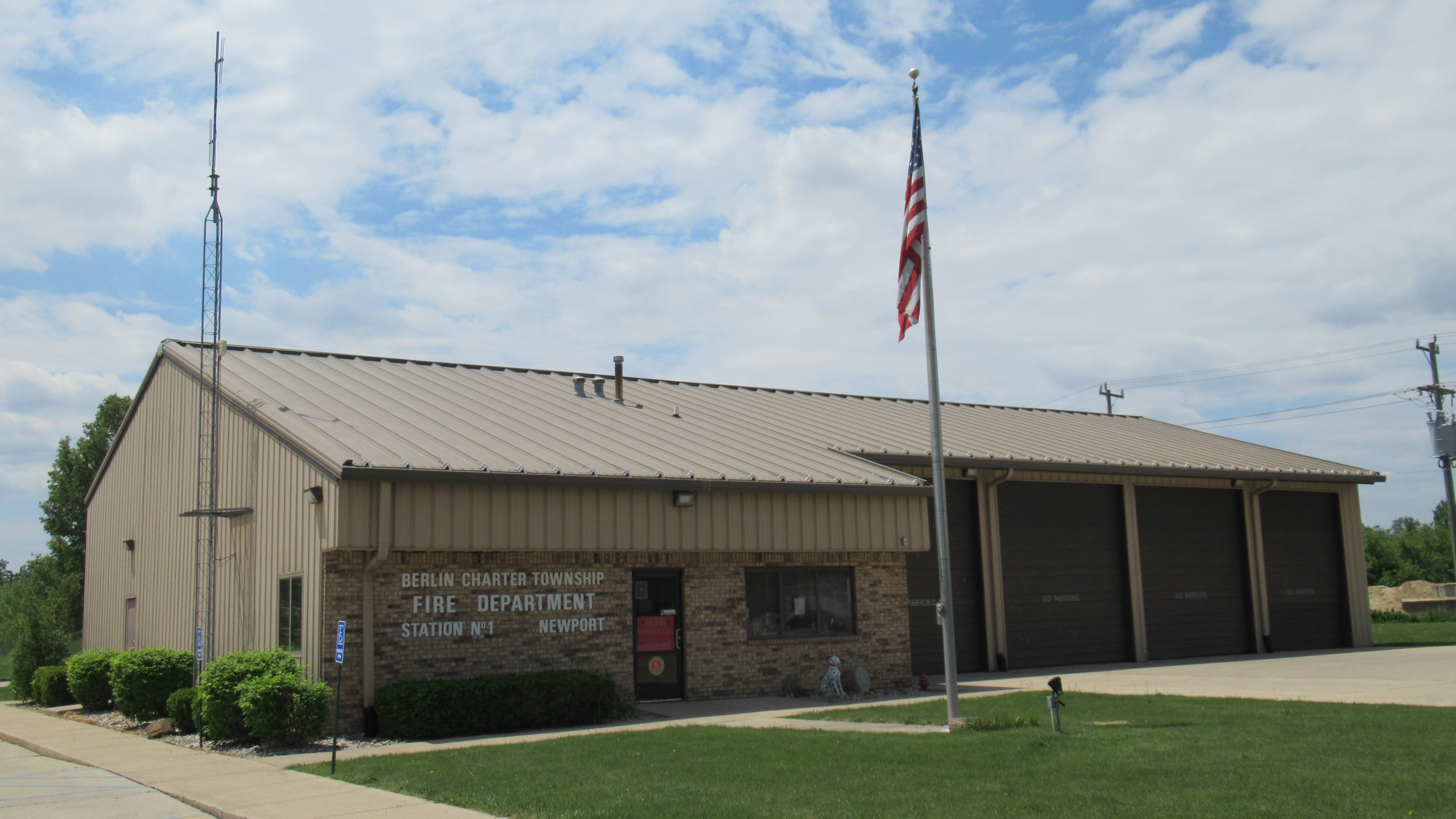
Township fire department in Newport
