= Ford Motor Company Lamp Factory =

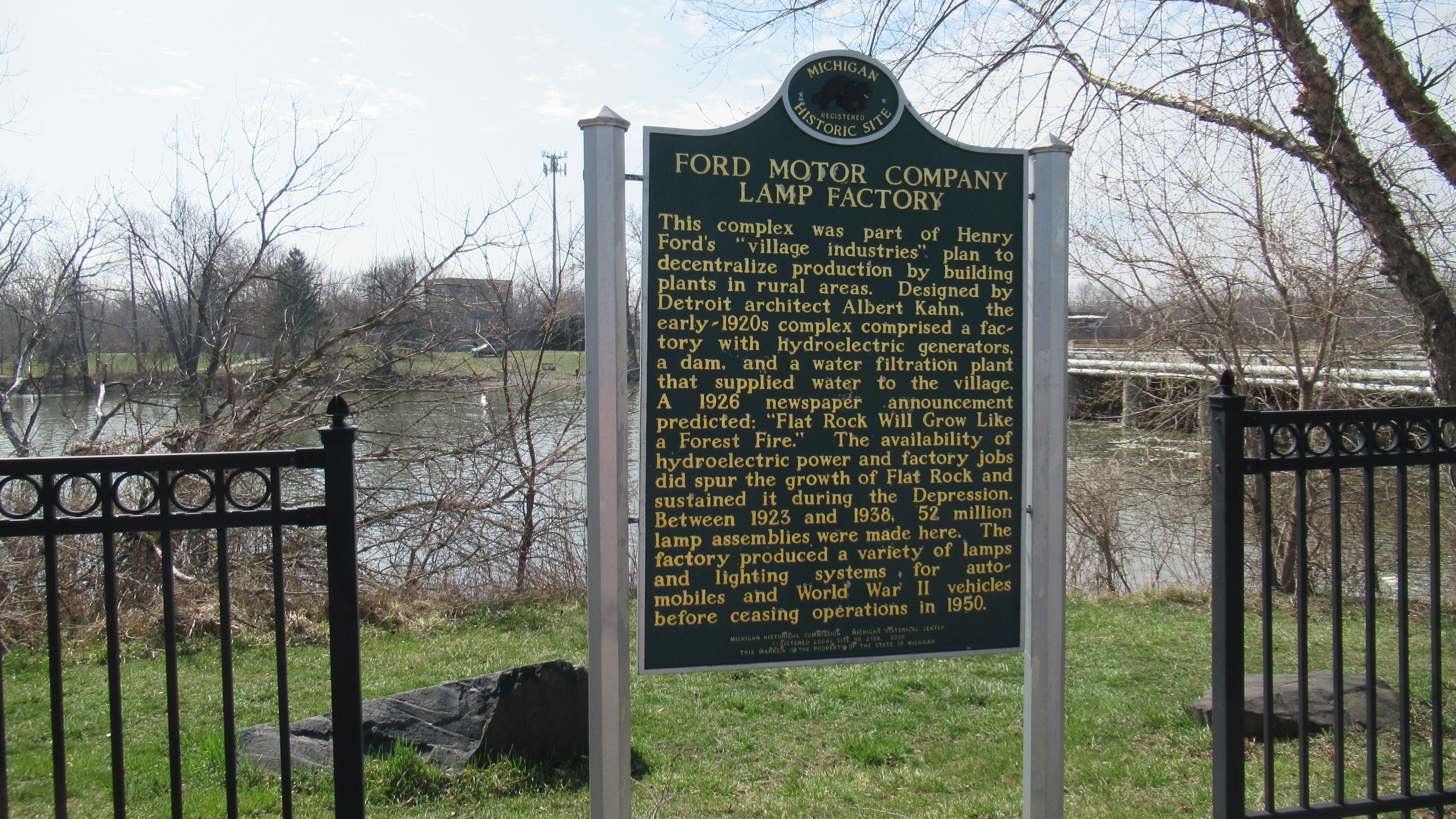
- State historic marker along the Huron River
- Interactive map
- 42°06′00″N 83°17′40″W
- Location: 26601 W. Huron River Drive; Flat Rock, Michigan

History
- Built: 1924

Site notes
- Architect: Albert Kahn

Michigan State Historic Site
- Designated: 2008

The Ford Motor Co. Lamp Factory in Flat Rock, Michigan, was one of Henry Ford's village industries, which were small rural factories. It was the product of a unique collaboration between industrialist Ford and his lead designer, Albert Kahn. Albert Kahn Associates is a large Detroit firm that did extensive early and groundbreaking architectural design work for the Ford Motor Company.

== History ==
Ford systematically acquired land, an existing dam on the Huron River, and water rights in the area where the old Metler and Diekman Mills stood. These rights along with over 200 acres (81 ha) from the George Case farm north and west of the mill race helped to comprise the eventual 568 acres (230 ha) that Ford eventually would own. Construction of a factory and a 385-foot (117 m) dam were carried out during 1921 and 1922. The dam had a fourfold purpose: to serve as a power plant, retain water in connection with the newly built water filtration plant, and to serve as a railroad bridge and a road for the passage of cars. Together the factory, dam/bridge, and water filtration plant represent a comprehensive program for the improvement of Flat Rock.

The factory, built by Stone & Webster, Inc., was one of several similar-appearing factories built for Ford, including others in Saint Paul, Minnesota, Green Island, New York, and Iron Mountain, Michigan.

Large turbines were once situated within the factory building. The eastern end of the plant was suspended from the land over water running through the mill race below. A photo from the 1930s shows this equipment setting in situ. Water power first generated was about 700 kilowatts.

Construction of the Ford complex had a profound and immediate impact on the residents of the area. The Village of Flat Rock was chartered on October 19, 1923. The following month the first headlamp was produced at the plant. So village and industry grew side-by-side.

Products the factory made included headlights, taillights, and interior light shells, reflectors, and lamp sockets. Five hundred men working two shifts at the plant could produce half a million headlights a month. During World War II, all of the 26 or so village industries were converted to participate in the war effort. The Flat Rock plant which produced head- and taillights, continued to produce these during the war, but for army trucks, Jeeps, tanks, the universal carrier, and the armored car. The Flat Rock plant also manufactured junction boxes for the B-24 bomber.

Benefits of having the Ford factory in the village of Flat Rock were numerous. First, there were the jobs created. Employment rose from 50 workers in 1924 to 500 by 1925 and a peak of 1,200 people in 1929. In wages alone, over a half-million dollars in wages were paid in the peak years of 1929 and 1930. Approximately a third of the tax revenue for the village of Flat Rock was also generated by the plant.

Another benefit came from the water filtration plant. This produced water for the factory, but also for the communities of Flat Rock, Rockwood, and South Rockwood. The original filtration plant built in the 1920s was sold to the then City of Flat Rock in 1951 and continued to operate until 1957 when a new plant was built on the island, directly opposite and to the south of the Ford plant. This filtration plant too was eventually abandoned, though has not been demolished due to prohibitive costs associated with demolition.

Commentators attribute the demise of the village industries concept, which the Flat Rock plant was part of, to a variety of factors including company leadership not understanding the value or money-making potential of these enterprises, obsolescence of facilities, and most prominently – unionization (Siegel).

Production at the Flat Rock Head & Tail Light Plant ceased in 1950, and operations were moved to the larger Monroe factory. In 1950 the vacant Flat Rock plant was sold to Moynahan Bronze Company that was then located in Detroit and which subsequently moved. This company produced furniture for Pullman cars, architectural molding, and parts for aircraft. The firm would occupy the plant from 1951 to 1972. Stearns Manufacturing owned and operated the plant from 1972 to 1981, at which time the present owner, Flat Rock Metal Inc., leased the building. The company has since purchased it and has occupied the building to the present time (2018).
