= Estral Beach, Michigan =

- Village
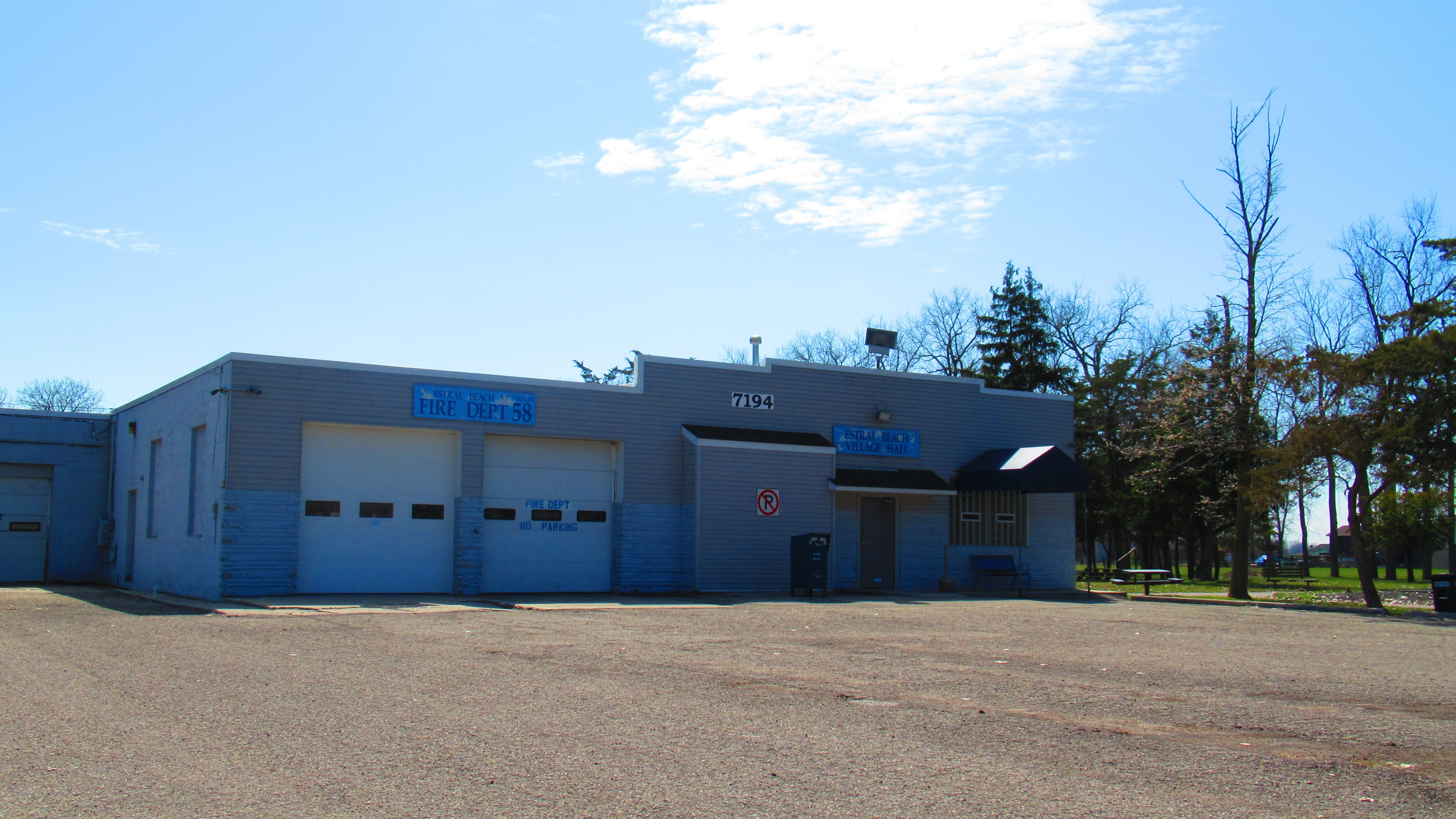
- Fire department and village hall

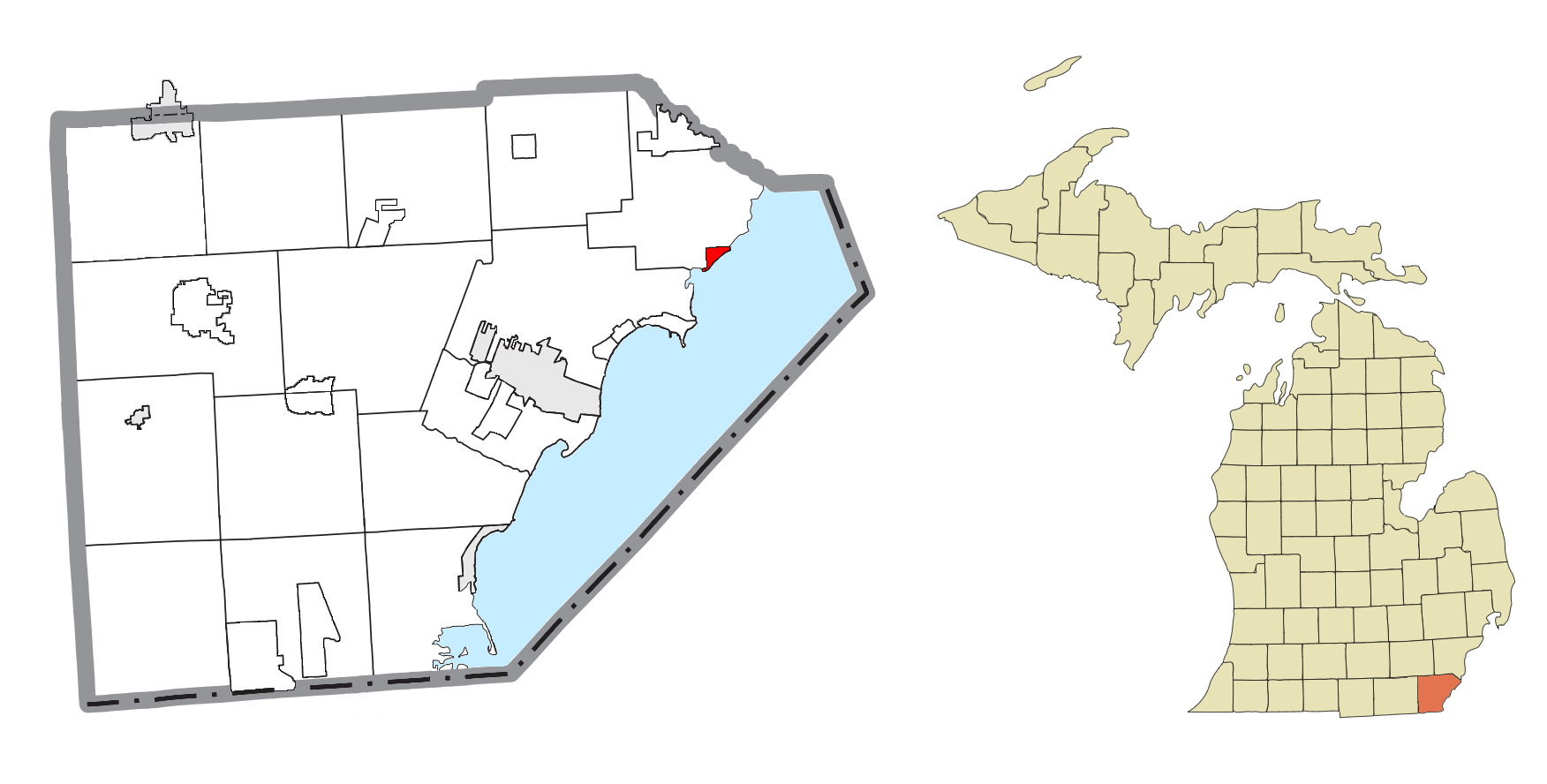
- Location within Monroe County and the state of Michigan

- Location within Michigan Location within the United States
- Coordinates: 41°59′03″N 83°14′09″W
- Country: United States
- State: Michigan
- County: Monroe
- Township: Berlin
- Incorporated: 1925

Government
  - Type: Village council
  - President: Fred Borowski
  - Clerk: Carol Vandercook

Area
  - Total: 0.45 sq mi (1.17 km^{2})
  - Land: 0.44 sq mi (1.14 km^{2})
  - Water: 0.012 sq mi (0.03 km^{2})
- Elevation: 571 ft (174 m)

Population (2020)
  - Total: 403
  - Density: 914.9/sq mi (353.24/km^{2})
- Time zone: UTC-5 (Eastern (EST))
  - Summer (DST): UTC-4 (EDT)
- ZIP Code: 48166 (Newport)
- Area code: 734
- FIPS code: 26-26460
- GNIS feature ID: 0625652
- Website: www.estralbeach.com

Estral Beach is a village in Monroe County in the U.S. state of Michigan. The population was 403 at the 2020 census. The village is located within Berlin Charter Township.

== History ==
Estral Beach was incorporated as a village in 1925. It was named after the Spanish word for "star".

== Geography ==
The village is in northeastern Monroe County, on the southern edge of Berlin Charter Township. It sits on the northwest shore of Lake Erie at the mouth of Swan Creek and about 8 miles (13 km) south of the mouth of the Detroit River. It is 13 miles (21 km) by road northeast of Monroe, the county seat, and 7 miles (11 km) south of Rockwood.

According to the U.S. Census Bureau, Estral Beach has a total area of 0.45 square miles (1.17 km^{2}), of which 0.44 square miles (1.14 km^{2}) are land and 0.005 square miles (0.01 km^{2}), or 1.12%, are water.

Pointe Mouillee State Game Area is located 1 mile (1.6 km) northeast of the village, and the Enrico Fermi Nuclear Generating Station is 2 miles (3 km) to the southwest. The Strong Unit of the Detroit River International Wildlife Refuge is located within the northern portion of the village and extends further north.

The village has never contained its own post office and uses the 48166 ZIP Code of Newport, 5 miles (8 km) to the northwest.

== Education ==
The village is served by Jefferson Schools.

== Demographics ==
Historical population
Census	Pop.	Note	%±
1940	78		—
1950	188		141.0%
1960	254		35.1%
1970	419		65.0%
1980	463		10.5%
1990	430		−7.1%
2000	486		13.0%
2010	418		−14.0%
2020	403		−3.6%
U.S. Decennial Census

=== 2010 census ===
As of the census of 2010, there were 418 people, 183 households, and 114 families residing in the village. The population density was 908.7 inhabitants per square mile (350.9/km^{2}). There were 220 housing units at an average density of 478.3 per square mile (184.7/km^{2}). The racial makeup of the village was 99.3% White and 0.7% Native American. Hispanic or Latino of any race were 1.0% of the population.

There were 183 households, of which 28.4% had children under the age of 18 living with them, 51.9% were married couples living together, 6.6% had a female householder with no husband present, 3.8% had a male householder with no wife present, and 37.7% were non-families. 33.3% of all households were made up of individuals, and 8.8% had someone living alone who was 65 years of age or older. The average household size was 2.28 and the average family size was 2.95.

The median age in the village was 45 years. 19.9% of residents were under the age of 18; 7.1% were between the ages of 18 and 24; 22.9% were from 25 to 44; 36.4% were from 45 to 64; and 13.6% were 65 years of age or older. The gender makeup of the village was 53.3% male and 46.7% female.

=== 2000 census ===
As of the census of 2000, there were 486 people, 179 households, and 131 families residing in the village. The population density was 983.7 inhabitants per square mile (379.8/km^{2}). There were 211 housing units at an average density of 427.1 per square mile (164.9/km^{2}). The racial makeup of the village was 93.00% White, 1.23% African American, 0.21% Native American, 0.41% from other races, and 5.14% from two or more races. Hispanic or Latino of any race were 2.67% of the population.

There were 179 households, out of which 31.8% had children under the age of 18 living with them, 59.8% were married couples living together, 7.8% had a female householder with no husband present, and 26.8% were non-families. 20.7% of all households were made up of individuals, and 7.3% had someone living alone who was 65 years of age or older. The average household size was 2.69 and the average family size was 3.15.

In the village, the population was spread out, with 25.1% under the age of 18, 7.6% from 18 to 24, 30.0% from 25 to 44, 27.8% from 45 to 64, and 9.5% who were 65 years of age or older. The median age was 37 years. For every 100 females, there were 101.7 males. For every 100 females age 18 and over, there were 102.2 males.

The median income for a household in the village was $48,194, and the median income for a family was $53,750. Males had a median income of $32,188 versus $30,417 for females. The per capita income for the village was $21,873. About 3.6% of families and 7.2% of the population were below the poverty line, including 6.7% of those under age 18 and 5.5% of those age 65 or over.
