= Ash Township, Michigan =

- Civil township
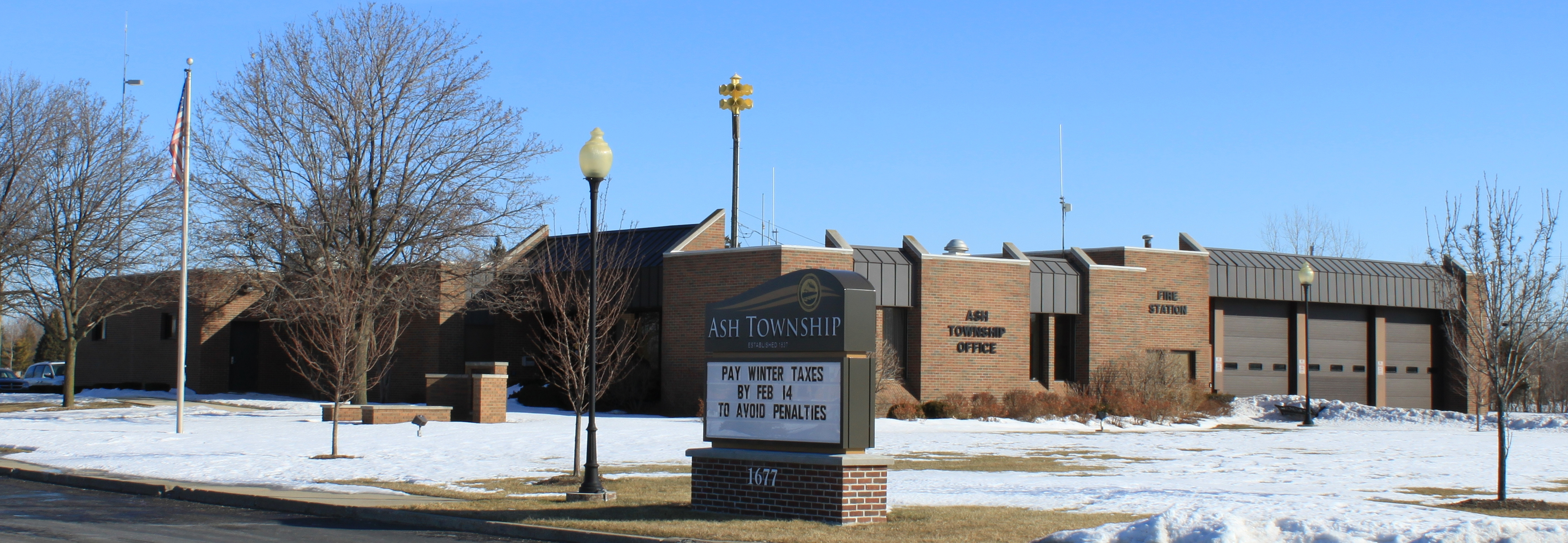
- Ash Township Hall and Fire Department

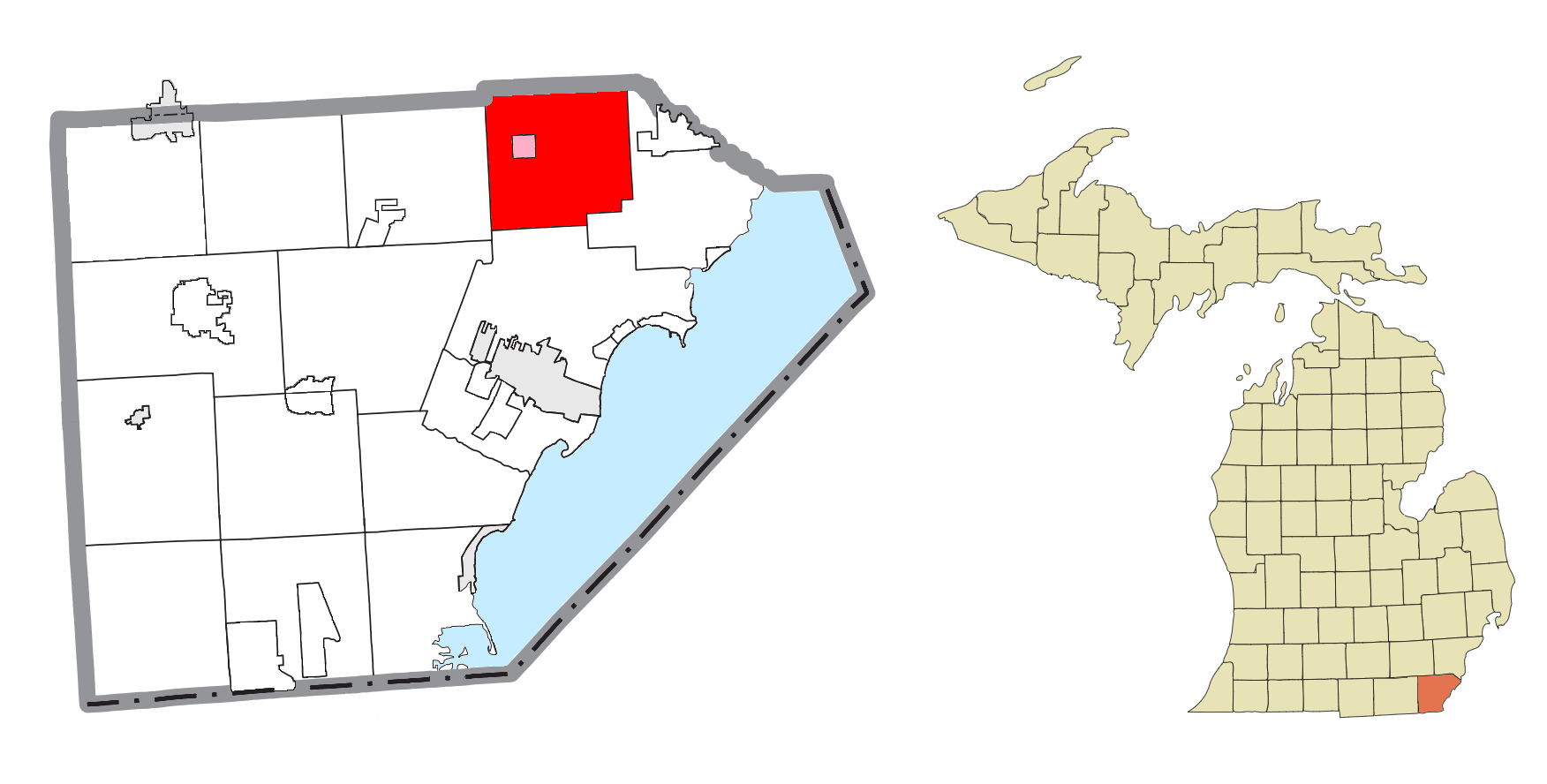
- Location within Monroe County (red) and the administered village of Carleton (pink)

- Location within Michigan Location within the United States
- Coordinates: 42°03′23″N 83°22′31″W
- Country: United States
- State: Michigan
- County: Monroe
- Organized: 1837

Government
  - Supervisor: Robin Carmack
  - Clerk: Michele Geiermann

Area
  - Total: 34.84 sq mi (90.24 km^{2})
  - Land: 34.60 sq mi (89.61 km^{2})
  - Water: 0.24 sq mi (0.62 km^{2})
- Elevation: 604 ft (184 m)

Population (2020)
  - Total: 7,860
  - Density: 227.1/sq mi (87.7/km^{2})
- Time zone: UTC-5 (Eastern (EST))
  - Summer (DST): UTC-4 (EDT)
- ZIP Codes: 48117 (Carleton); 48134 (Flat Rock); 48164 (New Boston); 48166 (Newport); 48179 (South Rockwood)
- Area code: 734
- FIPS code: 26-115-03680
- GNIS feature ID: 1625853
- Website: ashtownship.org

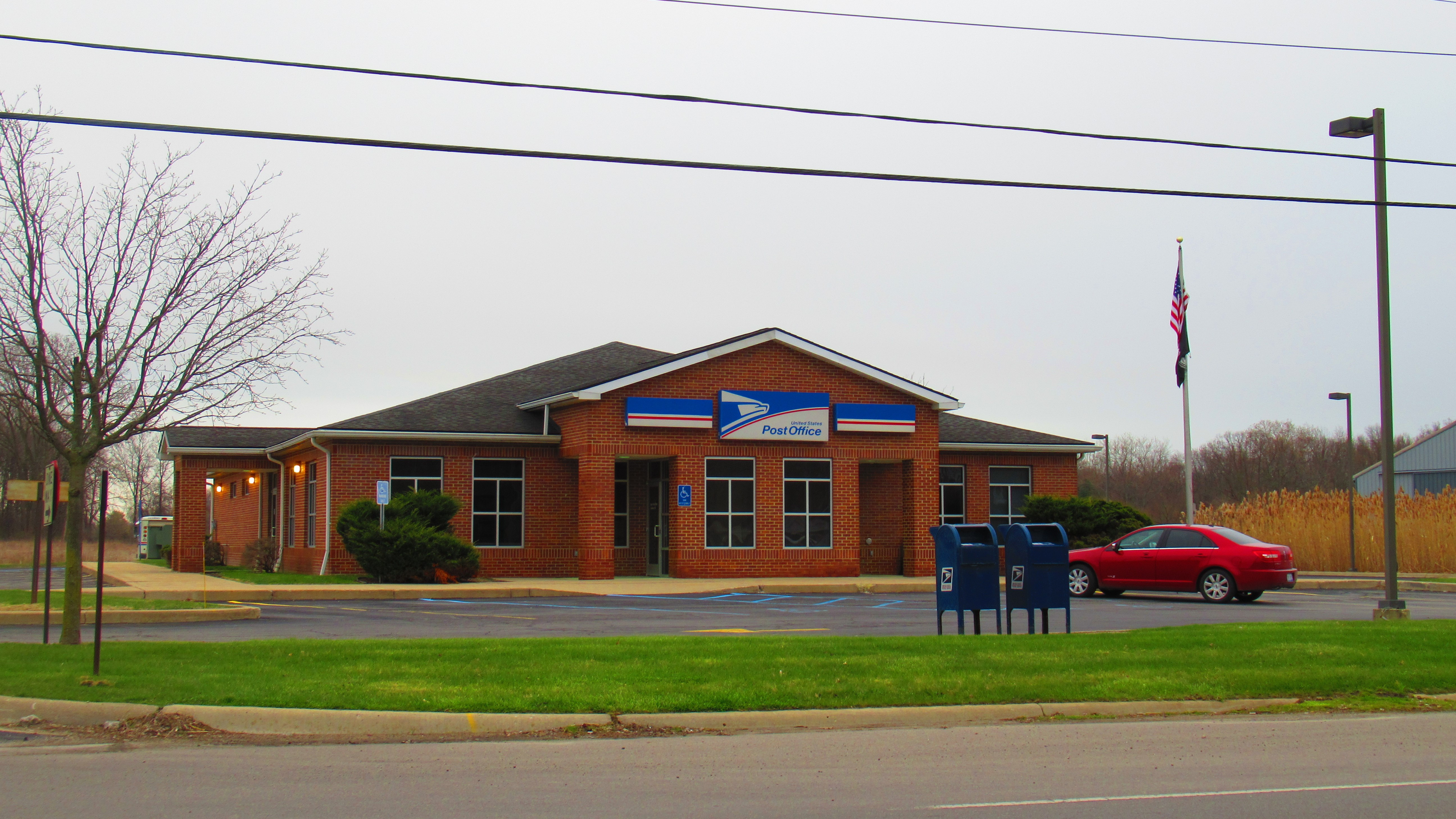
U.S. Post Office in Ash Township (Carleton 48117 ZIP Code)

Ash Township is a civil township of Monroe County in the U.S. state of Michigan. As of the 2020 census, the township population was 7,860.

== History ==
Ash Township was organized in 1837 from a northern portion of Frenchtown Township. The township was named after local resident Arba Ash, who proposed the name during an early township meeting.

Potter Cemetery is a historic cemetery located in eastern Ash Township.

== Communities ==
- Althone is a former settlement within the township. It was founded by German Catholics and had its own post office briefly from March 28, 1856, until January 30, 1858. The post office was restored and operated for a much longer time from December 29, 1863, until July 18, 1894.
- Briar Hill is a former settlement founded in 1897 along a train station on the Detroit & Lima Northern Railroad. It was located halfway between Carleton and Flat Rock. Briar Hill can be seen within the township on a 1911 map of Monroe County.
- Carleton is a village in the west-central portion of the township.
- Clark City is a former settlement that was built around a stave mill along Swan Creek. The community had its own post office from January 25, 1855, until December 19, 1866.
- Grafton is an unincorporated community located within the township at 42°02′12″N 83°23′23″W. It is located along the railway line and contained its own post office from March 14, 1850 to April 30, 1903.

== Geography ==
The township is in northeastern Monroe County, with its northern border forming the Wayne County line. According to the U.S. Census Bureau, the township has a total area of 34.84 square miles (90.24 km^{2}), of which 34.60 square miles (89.61 km^{2}) are land and 0.24 square miles (0.62 km^{2}), or 0.68%, are water. Most of the township is drained by Swan Creek and its tributaries. The northeast corner of the township is drained by Port Creek, a tributary of the Huron River, while the southwest corner is drained by Stony Creek. Swan Creek, Stony Creek, and the Huron River are all southeast-flowing direct tributaries of Lake Erie.

== Transportation ==
=== Airport ===
- Buzzwick Airport is a public-use airport in the southern part of the township.

=== Major highways ===
- I-275 runs south–north through the center of the township and has three access points: exit 2 (Telegraph Road), exit 5 (Carleton Rockwood Road), and exit 8 (Will Carleton Road) at the county line.
- US 24 (Telegraph Road) runs diagonally north through the southeastern portion of the township.

== Education ==
Ash Township is served by three separate school districts. The vast majority of the township is served by Airport Community Schools. A few very small northern portions of the township along Will Carleton Road are served by Huron School District in Huron Township in Wayne County. Another very small northeastern portion of the township along Telegraph Road is served by Flat Rock Community Schools in Flat Rock in Wayne County.

== Demographics ==
Historical population
Census	Pop.	Note	%±
1850	1,229		—
1860	2,124		72.8%
1870	1,451		−31.7%
1880	2,252		55.2%
1890	1,997		−11.3%
1900	1,913		−4.2%
1910	1,840		−3.8%
1920	1,735		−5.7%
1930	2,433		40.2%
1940	2,679		10.1%
1950	3,345		24.9%
1960	4,825		44.2%
1970	5,803		20.3%
1980	7,688		32.5%
1990	7,480		−2.7%
2000	7,610		1.7%
2010	7,783		2.3%
2020	7,860		1.0%
U.S. Decennial Census

As of the census of 2000, there were 7,610 people, 2,801 households, and 2,125 families residing in the township. The population density was 220.0 inhabitants per square mile (84.9/km^{2}). There were 2,942 housing units at an average density of 85.0 per square mile (32.8/km^{2}). The racial makeup of the township was 97.08% White, 0.32% African American, 0.32% Native American, 0.22% Asian, 0.01% Pacific Islander, 0.33% from other races, and 1.72% from two or more races. Hispanic or Latino of any race were 1.75% of the population.

There were 2,801 households, out of which 35.6% had children under the age of 18 living with them, 61.4% were married couples living together, 9.7% had a female householder with no husband present, and 24.1% were non-families. 20.3% of all households were made up of individuals, and 7.1% had someone living alone who was 65 years of age or older. The average household size was 2.72 and the average family size was 3.13. In the township the population was spread out, with 27.5% under the age of 18, 8.3% from 18 to 24, 29.4% from 25 to 44, 24.5% from 45 to 64, and 10.1% who were 65 years of age or older. The median age was 36 years. For every 100 females, there were 100.8 males. For every 100 females age 18 and over, there were 97.8 males.

The median income for a household in the township was $54,439, and the median income for a family was $61,020. Males had a median income of $47,892 versus $25,699 for females. The per capita income for the township was $24,271. About 4.6% of families and 6.3% of the population were below the poverty line, including 9.0% of those under age 18 and 4.7% of those age 65 or over.

== Notable people ==
- James DeSana, politician serving in the Michigan House of Representatives, lives in Ash Township
