= Newport, Michigan =

- Unincorporated community
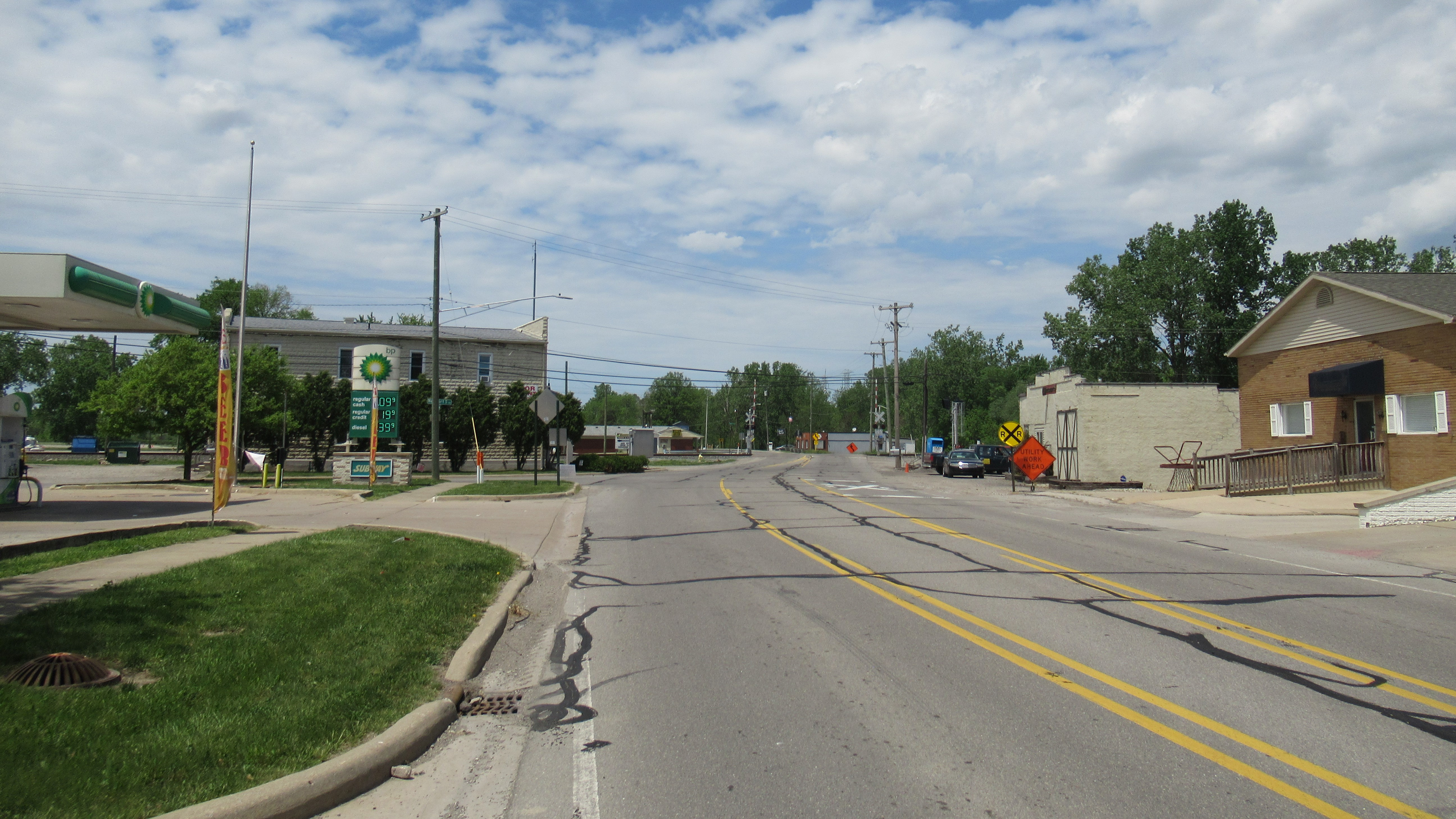
- Looking west along Swan Creek Road

- Location within the state of Michigan Location within the United States
- Coordinates: 42°00′08″N 83°18′31″W
- Country: United States
- State: Michigan
- County: Monroe
- Township: Berlin
- Settled: 1830
- Established: 1836
- Elevation: 591 ft (180 m)
- Time zone: UTC-5 (Eastern (EST))
  - Summer (DST): UTC-4 (EDT)
- ZIP code(s): 48166
- Area code: 734
- GNIS feature ID: 633372

Newport is an unincorporated community in Monroe County in the U.S. state of Michigan. The community is located within Berlin Charter Township. As an unincorporated community, Newport has no legally defined boundaries or population statistics of its own but does have its own post office with the 48166 ZIP Code.

== Geography ==
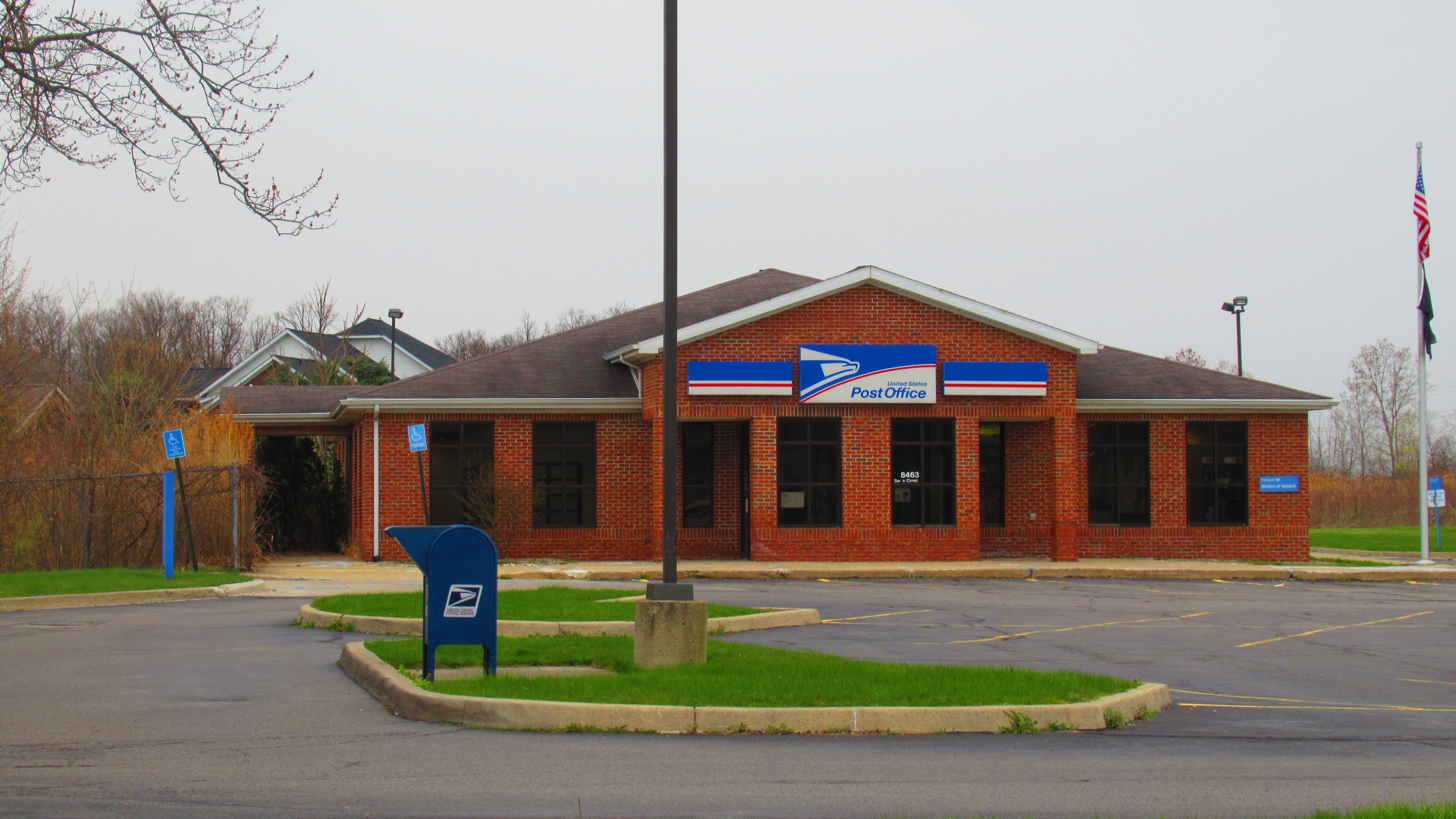
U.S. post office in Newport

Newport sits at an elevation of 591 feet (180 m) above sea level. The community is centered along Swan Creek Road just east of Interstate 75, and Newport is accessible via exit 21 (Swan Creek Road). Interstate 275 has its southern terminus to the southwest and runs just to the west of the community.

The community is located about 10 miles (16.1 km) north of the city of Monroe in the northeast portion of Monroe County. Other nearby communities include the village of Estral Beach to the east, South Rockwood to the northeast, and Carleton to the northwest. The unincorporated community of Oldport is located to the east along Swan Creek Road at the intersection with North Dixie Highway. While Oldport itself is recognized by the GNIS as a distinct location, the entire area is now generally referred to as Newport. Swan Creek runs though the center of the community and flows for about 5 miles (8.0 km) to the east into Lake Erie. Its tributary, Little Swan Creek, runs just south of the community. Yoas Drain also drains into Swan Creek near the center of the community.

The current Newport post office is located at 8463 Swan Creek Road. The post office uses the 48166 ZIP Code, which serves a much larger area that includes the southern portion of Berlin Charter Township, as well as the northeastern portion of Frenchtown Charter Township and a very small southeastern portion of Ash Township. The census-designated place of Stony Point and the village of Estral Beach also use the 48166 ZIP Code, as does the Enrico Fermi Nuclear Generating Station, Potter Cemetery, and portions of the Pointe Mouillee State Game Area.

Newport is served mostly by Airport Community Schools to the northeast, while residents in the southwestern portion of the community may attend Jefferson Schools.

== History ==
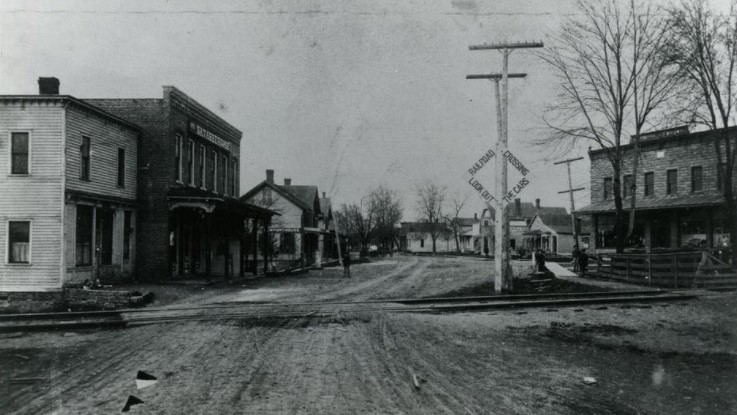
E. Main Street (now Swan Creek Road)

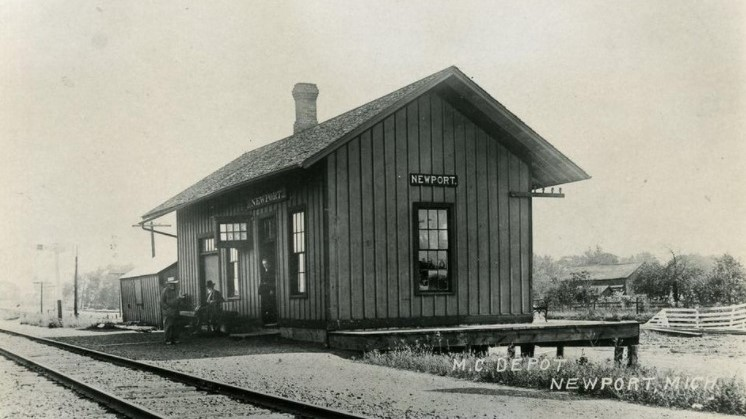
Historic image of the Newport Station

Newport was first settled in the Michigan Territory as early as 1830 by the French, who named it Rivière aux Signes (Swan Creek). By 1836, several sawmills were built along the creek, and the name Newport came about due to its location near Lake Erie. In 1837 after the territory received statehood, the community became part of the newly organized Ash Township. In 1867, the eastern portion of Ash Township and Newport were reorganized into Berlin Township.

Newport is the location of St. Charles Borromeo Catholic Church, which was established in 1882 from an earlier church mission that was formed as early as 1838. The current church is located at 8125 Swan Creek Road at the intersection with North Dixie Highway. St. Charles Cemetery is located in Newport, and it consists of two separate cemeteries. The "old" St. Charles Cemetery was established in 1851, although it contains a grave dating back to 1802. This small cemetery is no longer active, while the current St. Charles Cemetery is located slightly north along North Dixie Highway.

The community of Newport received its first post office on August 16, 1836. The post office was discontinued on July 1, 1841 but reestablished soon after on August 16, 1842. The current Newport post office was opened on January 15, 1904 and remains in operation. In the early 1970s, the post office became a branch of the Monroe postal service.

Newport once contained its own railroad station. The station was used by Lake Shore and Michigan Southern Railway, Michigan Central Railroad, and Detroit and Toledo Shore Line Railroad. While Newport no longer contains an active station, there are two railroad lines that run through the community: a single line operated by Norfolk Southern Railway and a dual line operated by Canadian National Railway. The original station was moved and restored, and it is currently used as educational building for the nearby Newport Community Church.

== Images ==
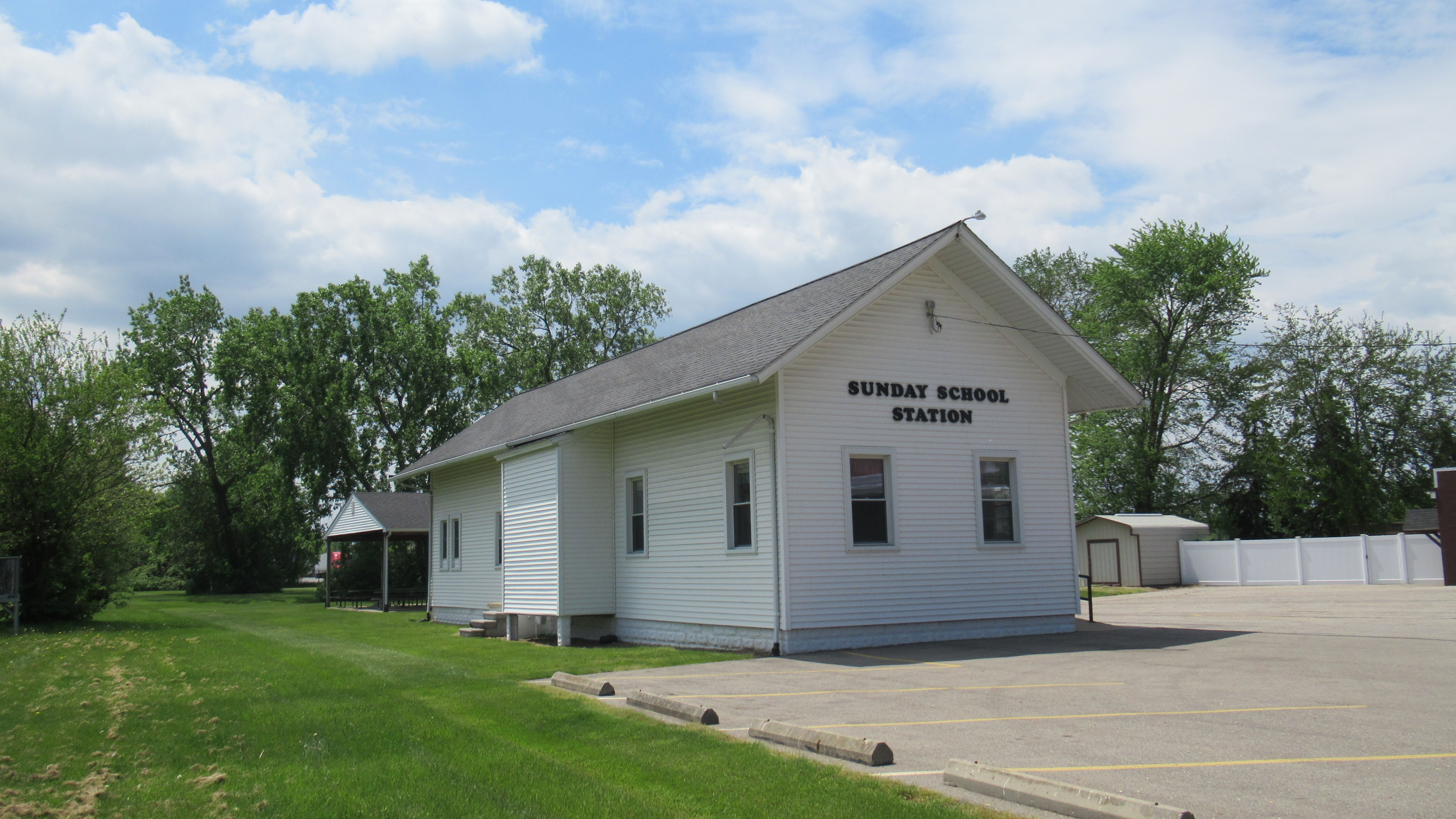
The Newport Station in 2021

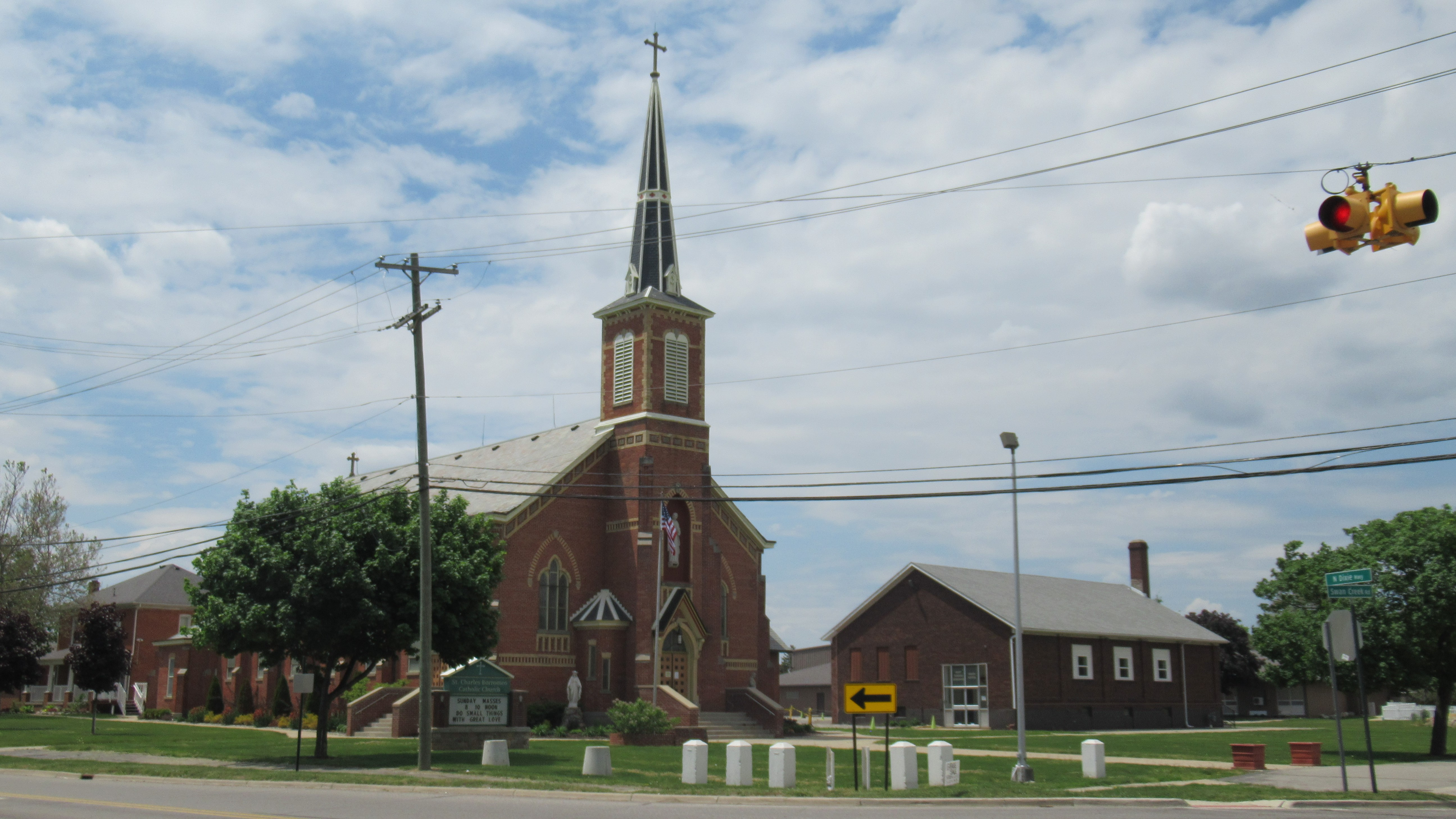
St. Charles Borromeo Catholic Church

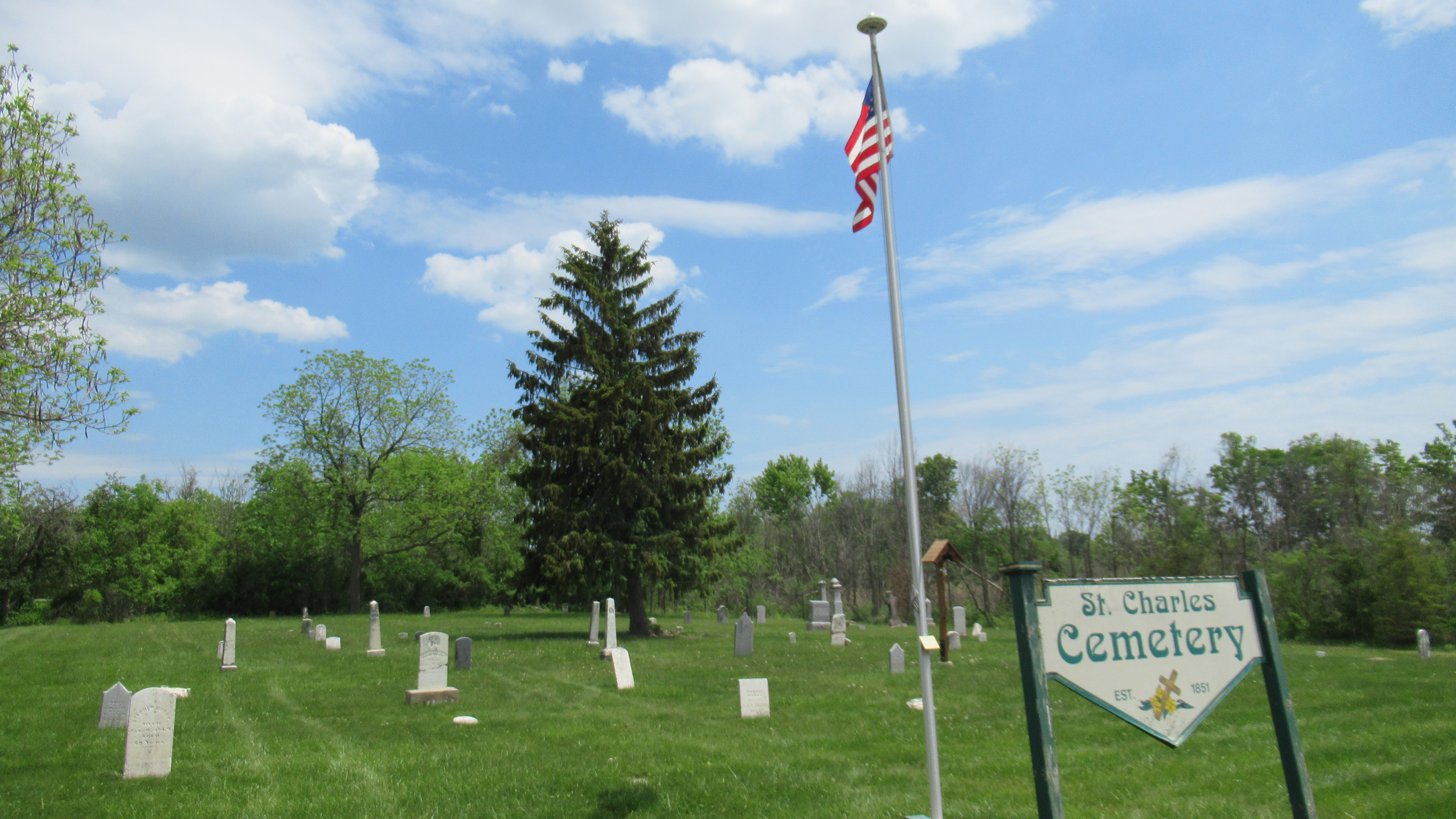
The "old" St. Charles Cemetery

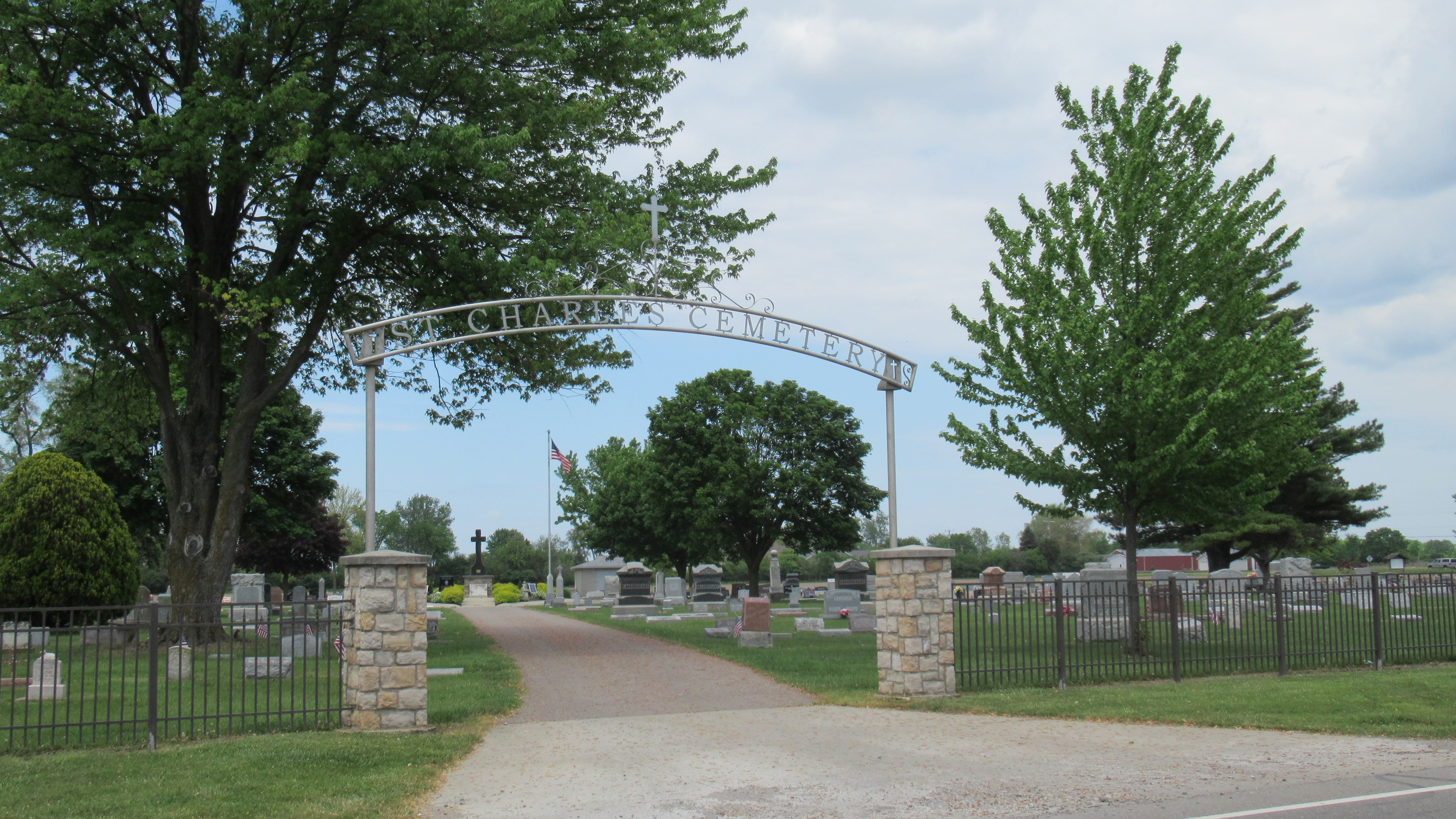
St. Charles Cemetery
