= Potter Cemetery =

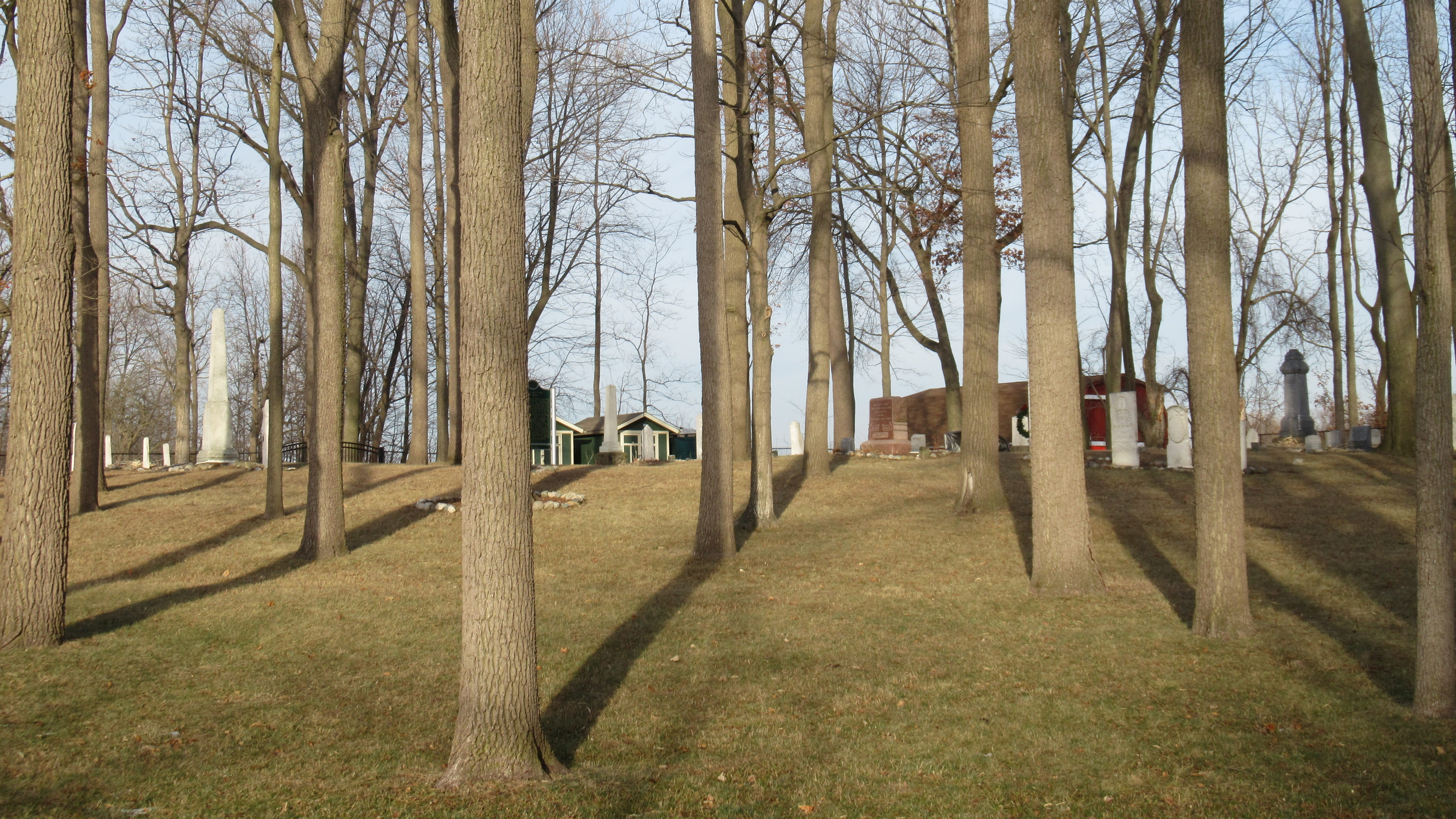
- Interactive map of Potter Cemetery

Details
- Established: 1847 (179 years ago)
- Location: 3700 East Sigler Road; Newport, Michigan 48166
- Country: United States
- Coordinates: 42°01′37″N 83°18′25″W
- Type: Historic
- Owned by: Trustees and Friends of Potter Cemetery
- Size: 1.0 acre (0.4 ha)
- No. of graves: 82
- Find a Grave: Potter Cemetery

Potter Cemetery / Public Act 525 of 2012
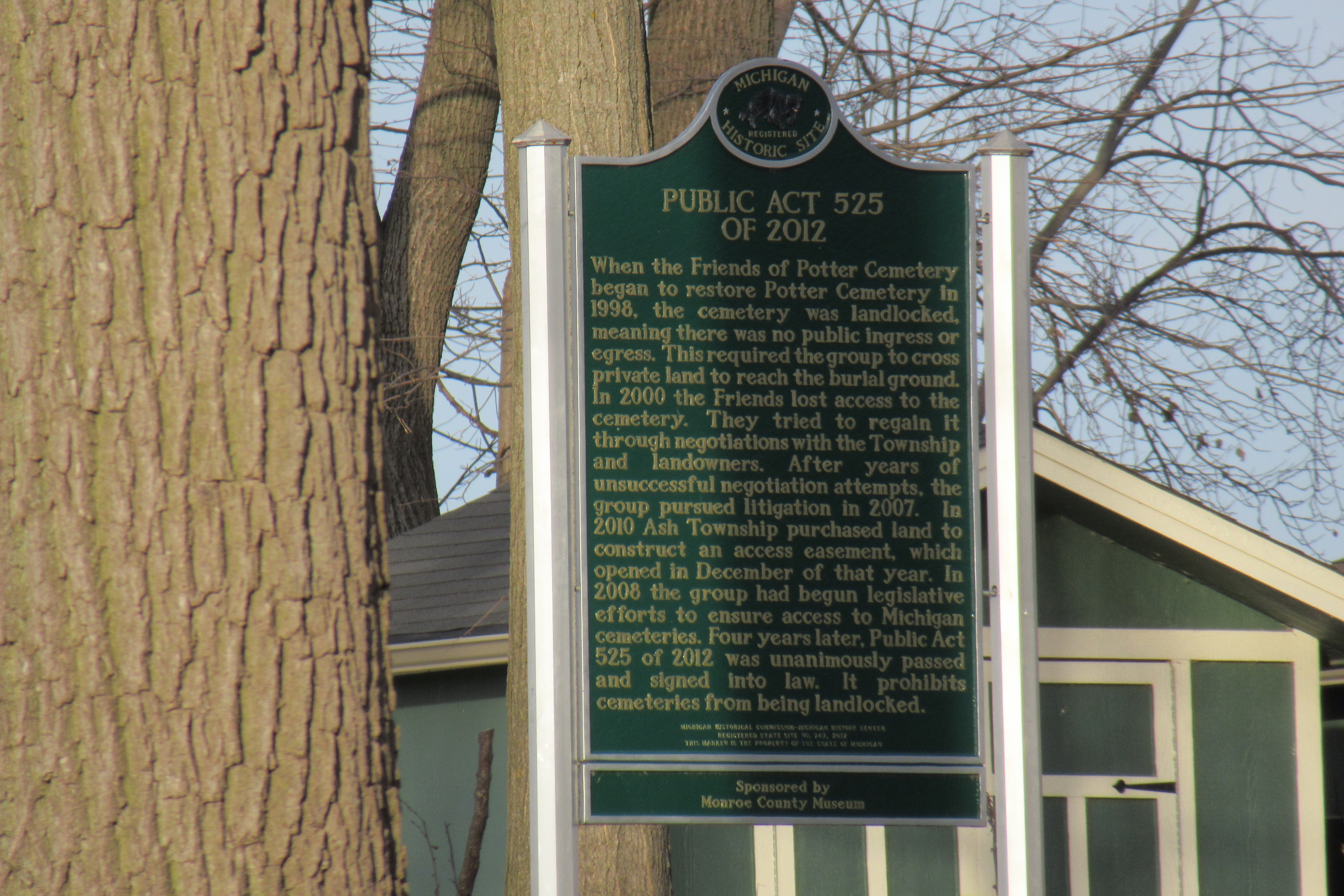
- Interactive map of Potter Cemetery / Public Act 525 of 2012

Michigan State Historic Site
- Designated: 2017

Potter Cemetery is a privately owned, historic cemetery located in Ash Township in the U.S. state of Michigan.

The cemetery was established as early as 1847 with its last known gravesite dating to 1930. By 1968, the state abandoned the cemetery, and it later became inaccessible as a result of private property surrounding the cemetery. This led to changes in state law prohibiting cemeteries from being landlocked with the passage of Public Act 525 of 2012. This allowed for recent restoration efforts, and the cemetery and state legislation were dedicated as a Michigan State Historic Site in 2017.

== Cemetery history ==
In 1847, this site became the cemetery for early residents of Ash Township, which was established in 1837. The site was located on the property line between the Potter and Flint homesteads near Swan Creek. In 1860, the families deeded the 1.0-acre (0.4 ha) cemetery to the Swan Creek Cemetery Company, and the cemetery was also known as Swan Creek Cemetery. There was no direct roadway leading to the cemetery, but a farmer's lane allowed easy access. The cemetery remained active until its last known burial in 1930. By then, there were over 80 graves, some of which belonged to the township's earliest settlers, five Masonic lodge members, and six Civil War veterans.

The state of Michigan took over ownership of the now-defunct Potter Cemetery, although it became neglected due to its remote and inaccessible location. The surrounding land continued to be privately owned farmland with a farmer's lane providing access to the cemetery. The state abandoned the cemetery in 1968, and it became overgrown with vegetation and sometimes vandalized.

In 1998, local residents who had descendants buried in the cemetery formed the Friends of Potter Cemetery organization to begin restoration efforts on the abandoned cemetery, including repairing broken and obscured gravestones, clearing the overgrown vegetation and dead trees, and constructing a fence. Officially, the cemetery contains 82 known burial sites, but there could be as many as 200 due to missing or buried gravestones. Access to the cemetery is restricted and only provided from a gated easement from Sigler Road about 0.75 miles (1.21 km) north of the cemetery. Access is only allowed on scheduled group days or with permission from the township office.

Potter Cemetery should not be confused with the term potter's field, of which one of these burial sites is located on the present-day campus of Monroe County Community College to the south in Monroe Township. This site served as a burial ground for unclaimed or indigent people dating from the War of 1812 until as recently as the 1940s.

== Public Act 525 of 2012 ==
By 1996, the land surrounding Potter Cemetery was sold and subdivided into four parcels. The township divided the land for future development, but no roadway or easement was created to provide access to the cemetery, despite the idea being advised by the township attorney. In May 1999, the Friends of Potter Cemetery began their restoration efforts on the cemetery after nearly 60 years of neglect. The township agreed to allow members to visit the cemetery on 13 designated workdays to pursue their restoration efforts, in which access to the cemetery required crossing private property.

In September 2000, the surrounding private property owners denied the Friends of Potter Cemetery the right to pass through their land and gain access to the cemetery, which halted their restoration efforts. Several years of negotiations failed, and the group began seeking legal litigation. In 2008, they sought help from county politician Dale Zorn to propose legislation that would prevent cemeteries from being landlocked and inaccessible. The proposed legislation became known as House Bill 5589, and it passed in the Michigan House of Representatives on March 4, 2008. However, the bill died in the Michigan Senate at the end of the 2007–2008 session. In 2010, the township purchased the necessary land needed to create an easement to gain access to the cemetery. This effectively ended the Friends of Potter Cemetery's legal argument, and restoration efforts resumed.

However, the legal battle to protect these future rights for Potter Cemetery and potentially other similar cemeteries in the state continued. To protect these future rights, an amendment would need to be made to the Land Division Act (Act 288 of 1967), which details and regulates the division of land for future development. A negative consequence of the Land Division Act meant that inactive cemeteries without direct road access could effectively become landlocked when the surrounding land is divided. While House Bill 5589 failed in 2008, a similar bill was again proposed by Dale Zorn in 2012, who was now serving on the Michigan House of Representatives. The new bill would become known as House Bill 5404. The legislation cited the Potter Cemetery landlocked dilemma, and it gained support from the Friends of Potter Cemetery, the Michigan Cemetery Association, and the Michigan Townships Association, while the Michigan Association of Realtors remained neutral on the issue. Summarized, House Bill 5404 would "prohibit a land division or land plat that isolates a cemetery so that it is not accessible, and instead require that cemeteries be served by easements that provide vehicular access." The bill passed unanimously in both the house and senate, where it became state law under Public Act 525 of 2012.

== Historic designation ==
Due to the efforts of the Friends of Potter Cemetery and subsequent state legislation, the site was dedicated as a Michigan State Historic Site in 2017. Both the Potter Cemetery and Public Act 525 of 2012 were recognized with a single, dual-sided state historic marker erected in the center of the cemetery in 2017. The Monroe County Historical Museum sponsored the historic marker, which is owned by the state and installed by the Michigan Historical Commission. It is the newest of the 27 state historic sites in Monroe County.

The historic marker details Potter Cemetery on the front and Public Act 525 of 2012 on the reverse side.

Potter Cemetery: In 1847 Ash and Berlin Township people began to be buried in this cemetery, located on the property line between Royal and Mary Ann Potter's land and that of John and Margaret Flint. In 1860 the couples each deeded half an acre to the Swan Creek Cemetery Company. By the last known burial, in 1930, more than eighty people had been buried here, including five Masonic Lodge members, six Civil War veterans, early area citizens and their descendants. Over the years, the cemetery deteriorated due to neglect and inaccessibility. Grave stones were vandalized, and plants grew wild. The State of Michigan declared Potter Cemetery abandoned in 1968. In 1998 descendants of those buried here formed the Friends of Potter Cemetery to begin restoration efforts, including repairing grave markers, removing trees and stumps and installing a fence.

Public Act 525 of 2012: When the Friends of Potter Cemetery began to restore Potter Cemetery in 1998, the cemetery was landlocked, meaning there was no public ingress or egress. This required the group to cross private land to reach the burial ground. In 2000 the Friends lost access to the cemetery. They tried to regain it through negotiations with the Township and landowners. After years of unsuccessful negotiation attempts, the group pursued litigation in 2007. In 2010 Ash Township purchased land to construct an access easement, which opened in December of that year. In 2008 the group had begun legislative efforts to ensure access to Michigan cemeteries. Four years later, Public Act 525 of 2012 was unanimously passed and signed into law. It prohibits cemeteries from being landlocked.
