= Flat Rock Community Schools =

School district in Michigan

Address
- 28639 Division Street Flat Rock, Wayne County, Michigan, 48134; United States

District information
- Grades: Pre-Kindergarten-12
- Superintendent: Andrew Brodie
- Schools: 5
- Budget: $33,708,000 2022-2023 expenditures
- NCES District ID: 2607080

Students and staff
- Students: 1,754 (2024-2025)
- Teachers: 106.1 (on an FTE basis) (2024-2025)
- Staff: 228.07 FTE (2024-2025)
- Student–teacher ratio: 16.53 (2024-2025)

Other information
- Website: www.flatrockschools.org

Flat Rock Community Schools is a public school district in Metro Detroit. In Wayne County, Michigan, it serves Flat Rock and part of Huron Township. It also serves parts of Ash Township and Berlin Township in Monroe County. Flat Rock Community Schools mascot is a ram, and their school colors are green and gold.

== History ==
The school building later known as the Reading Building was constructed in 1911 at the intersection of Garden Boulevard and Gibraltar Street. In 2022, it became the subject of a preservation effort but was ultimately demolished in 2023. Nearby, Flat Rock High School was constructed at a later date. The Reading Building served as district administration offices until 1999, when they were moved to the former high school.

Three junior high students were killed by lightning on May 29, 1941, after the tree they were sheltering under was struck. At the time, the school had an open-campus policy during the noon recess. The boys had been returning from lunch when they took shelter under the tree, about half a block from the school, during a sudden thunderstorm.

== Buildings ==
Schools in Flat Rock Community Schools district
School	Address	Grades	Notes
Flat Rock Community High School	25600 Seneca St.	Grades 9-12	Built 2000
Thomas Simpson Middle School	4900 Meadows Ave.	Grades 6-8	Built 1965
John M. Barnes Elementary School	24925 Meadows Ave.	Grades 3-5	Built around 1955
Ethel C. Bobcean Elementary School	28300 Evergreen St.	Grades PreK-2	Built 1957
FRCS Early Childhood Center	30100 Olmstead Road	Preschool	
Flat Rock Community Schools Administration	28639 Division St.		Built around 1950

== Revenue and spending ==
Flat Rock Community School District averages $15,017 in revenue, which is based on student population, and has gone up 11% over the last 4 years. The district averages $12,564 in spending, which has increased 13% over the last 4 years.

== Safety and security ==
The school district provides resources for safety and security on their website, in which they note that all buildings are equipped with intercoms at the main entry doors and ALICE training for all staff, among other things. Flat Rock Community Schools have not faced any serious acts of violence. The middle and high school have been victims of very few threats, all of which were reported and resulted in no harm to the students or staff.
