= Fix House =

- Formerly listed on the U.S. National Register of Historic Places
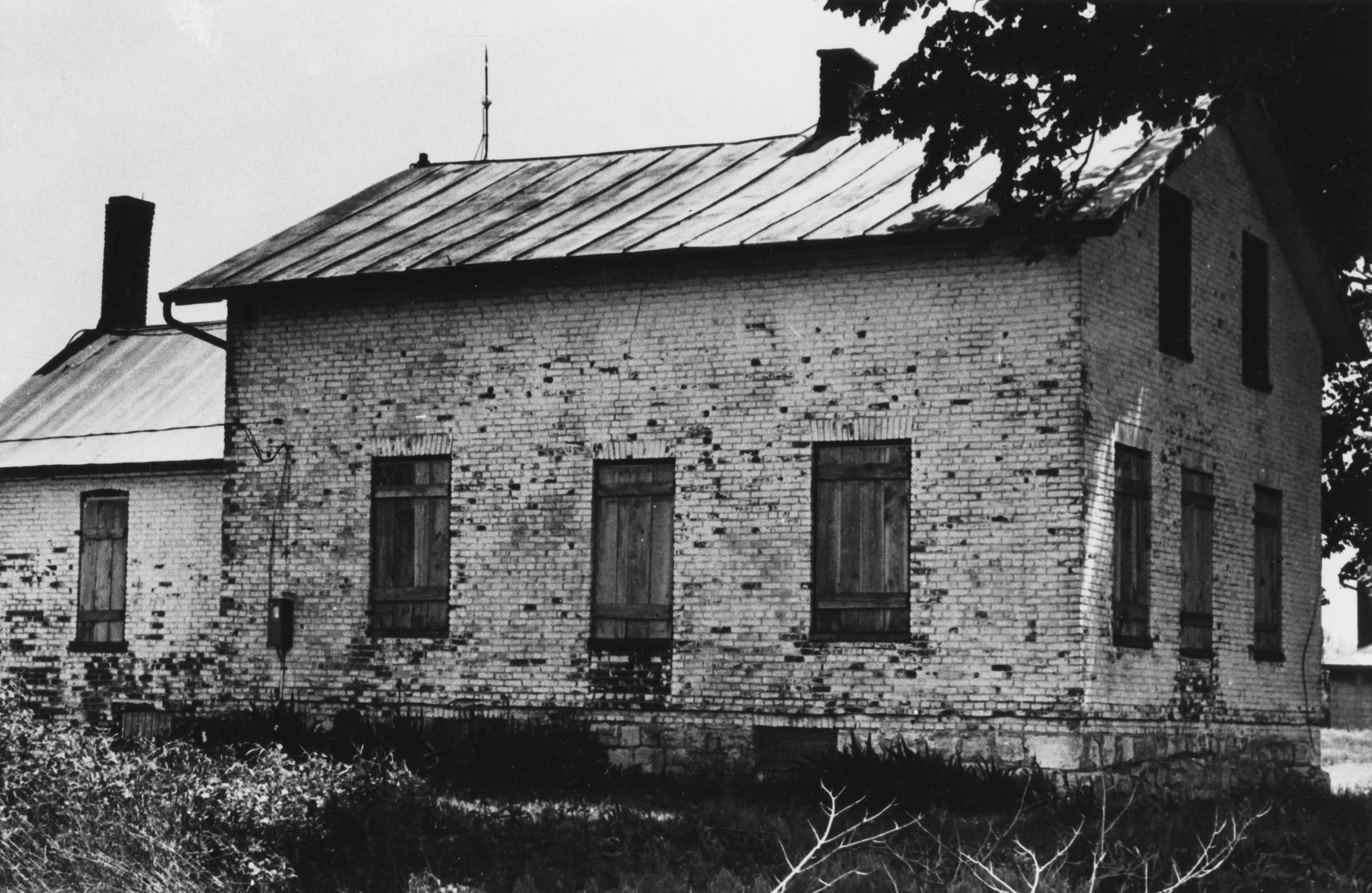
- Fix House, 1971
- Location: Sterling State Park, Frenchtown Township, Michigan
- Coordinates: 41°55′39″N 83°20′37″W
- Area: 1 acre (0.40 ha)
- Built: 1853
- Demolished: 1980
- NRHP reference No.: 72000643

Significant dates
- Added to NRHP: March 16, 1972
- Removed from NRHP: June 1, 1981

The Fix House was a single-family home located in the northwestern corner of Sterling State Park in Frenchtown Township just north of the city of Monroe, Michigan, United States. The house was listed on the National Register of Historic Places, but was demolished in 1980, and removed from the list in 1981.

== Description ==
The Fix House was a 1 1/2-story brick structure, built in the style of French-Canadian vernacular cottages. The original main section measured 24 by 30 feet, and is of brick on a limestone foundation. This main section had a center entrance flanked by two windows. A wing was later added to one side, and a porch was added to the rear.

Only fifteen buildings were constructed in this style in Monroe County, which was first settled by French pioneers in the 1780s.

== History ==
The land where the Fix house stood was inhabited before the War of 1812. In 1828, Joseph Fix emigrated with his family from Alsace-Lorraine to Monroe. Joseph died the next year. In 1832 his widow, Ann, purchased this property and farmed it with her son George. Ann and George constructed new buildings, likely of log construction. The house was built in 1853, with side wings added in about 1870.

George Fix lived in the house until his death in 1898, after which his son Leanus took over the farmstead. Leanus Fix owned the property until his death in 1960. In 1966, the state acquired the property as an addition to Sterling State Park. However, the house was uninhabited and continued to deteriorate. The house was demolished in 1980.
