= Flat Rock, Michigan =

- City
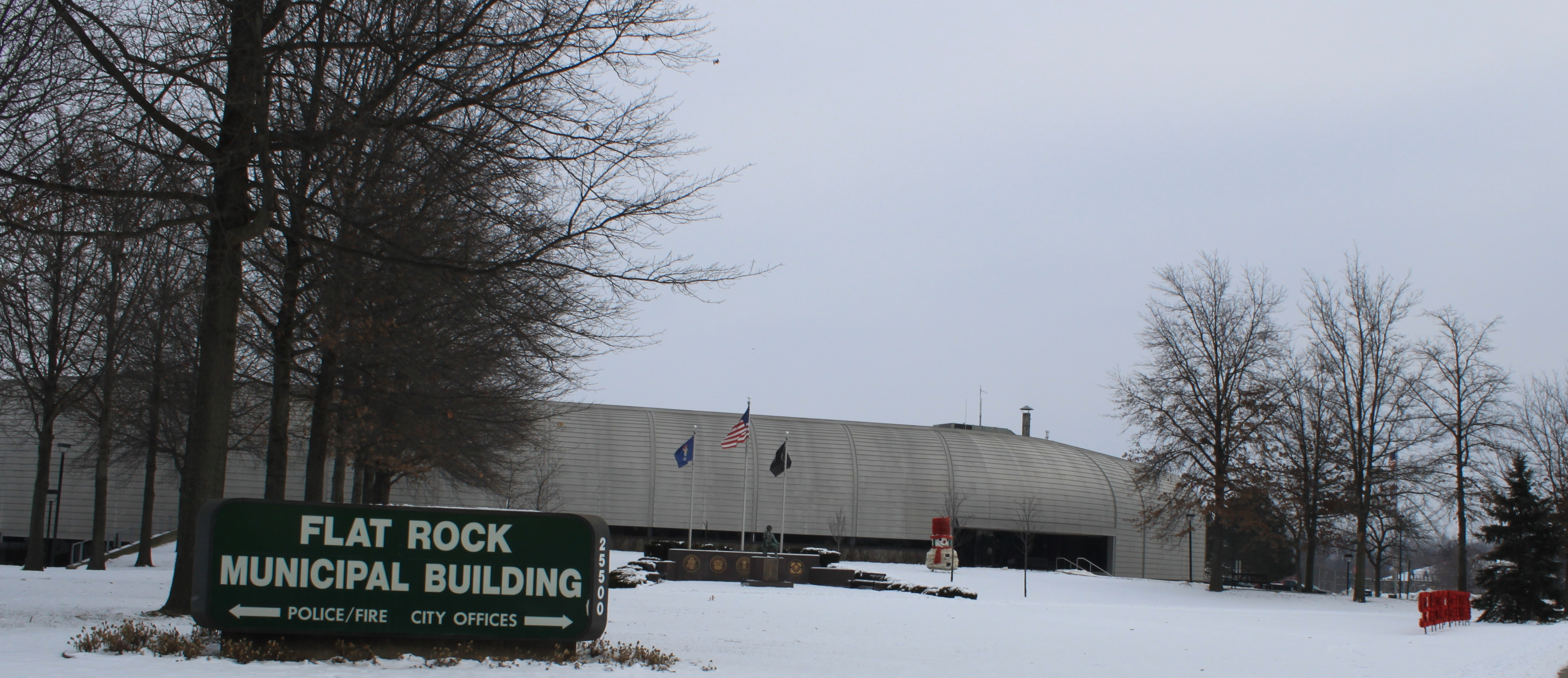
- Flat Rock Municipal Building

- Seal

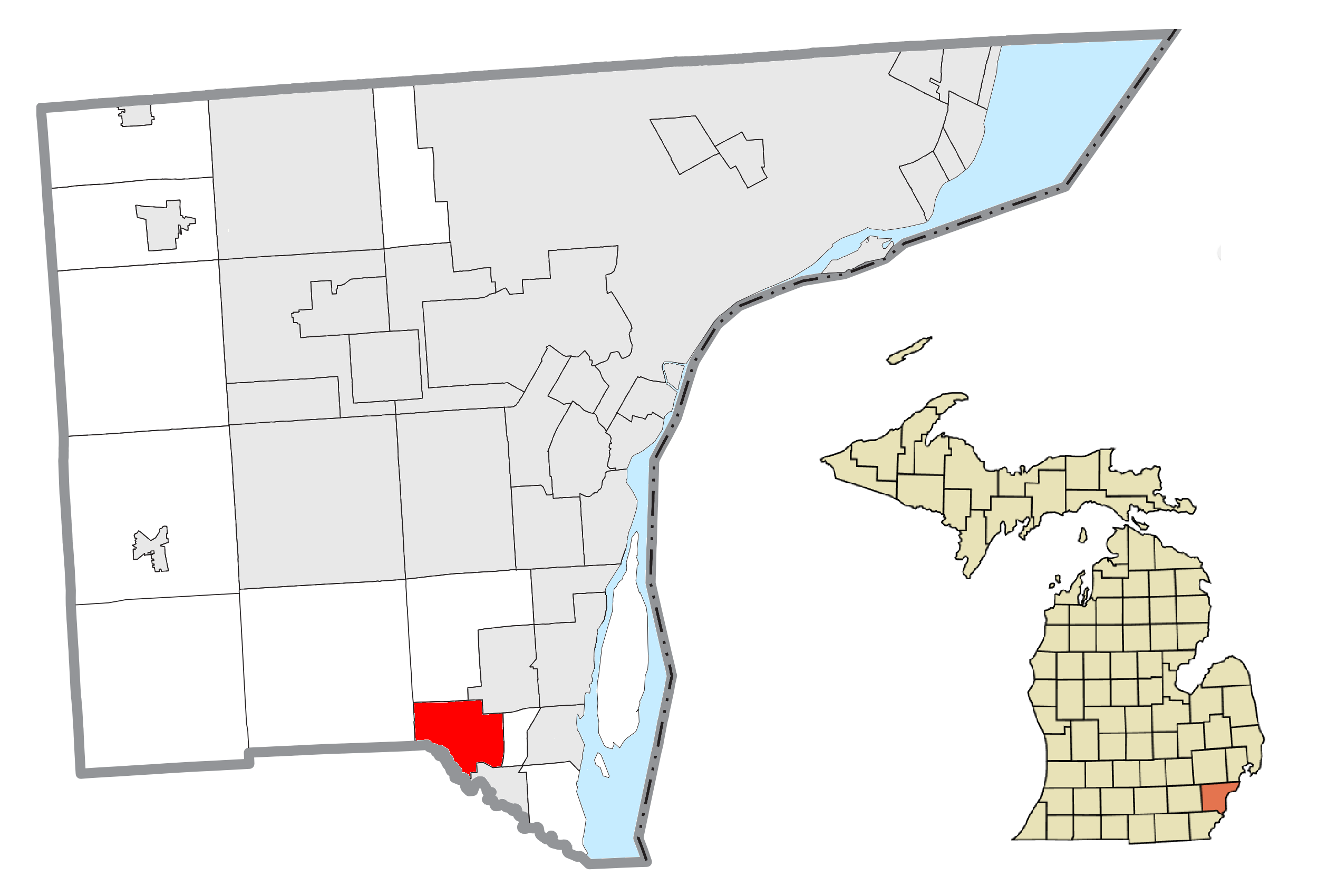
- Location within Wayne County and the state of Michigan

- Location within Michigan Location within the United States
- Coordinates: 42°06′07″N 83°16′22″W
- Country: United States
- State: Michigan
- Counties: Wayne; Monroe
- Incorporated: 1923 (village); 1965 (city)

Government
  - Type: Mayor–council
  - Mayor: Steve Beller
  - Clerk: Shane Anne Harrison

Area
  - Total: 6.71 sq mi (17.37 km^{2})
  - Land: 6.57 sq mi (17.01 km^{2})
  - Water: 0.14 sq mi (0.36 km^{2})
- Elevation: 597 ft (182 m)

Population (2020)
  - Total: 10,541
  - Density: 1,604.8/sq mi (619.61/km^{2})
- Time zone: UTC−5 (EST)
  - Summer (DST): UTC−4 (EDT)
- ZIP Code: 48134; 48173 (Rockwood)
- Area code: 734
- FIPS code: 26-28360
- GNIS feature ID: 0626146
- Website: www.flatrockmi.org

Flat Rock is a city in Wayne and Monroe counties in the U.S. state of Michigan. A Downriver suburb of Detroit, Flat Rock is located roughly 23 miles (37.0 km) southwest of downtown Detroit. At the 2020 census, the city had a population of 10,541.

== History ==
Flat Rock began as a Wyandot settlement. It was later designated as a reservation for the Wyandot, and still functioned as such in 1830.

The first European-American settlers in Flat Rock were Michael Vreeland and his five grown sons between 1811 and 1820. Vreeland had been captured by British Rangers during the Revolutionary War and released after American independence. The family purchased 800 acres (3.2 km^{2}). The town was called the "Village of Vreeland" until 1838, when the Vreeland family sold off most of the land and relinquished control of the area. The Vreeland families built the first grain and lumber mill, having brought the grinding stones from New York. Descendants of Michael Vreeland still live in the town and attend Flat Rock public schools, being the seventh generation to reside in the town their family founded.

The first mention of any settlers in the area later to become Flat Rock was made by a French priest, Father Jean Dilhet. In describing his parish in 1798 he included "Grosse Roche", referring to a settlement named after the outcropping of limestone rock on the south side of the Huron River.

In 1818, a land office opened in Detroit, and Soloman Sibley purchased 330.93 acres (1.3392 km^{2}) of land. In 1824 it was sold to Michael and Jacob Vreeland. Vreeland and Smooth Rock villages were platted on part of this acreage. At this time there were Huron, Seneca, and Wyandot Indian villages in the area.

With the Erie Canal opening in 1825, many people, especially from New York, came to Michigan to settle. By 1828 the village had four stores, two saw mills, a wool carding mill, a flour mill, and 250 inhabitants - serving as a center mainly for farmers who lived in the area immediately surrounding the settlement.

The village of Flat Rock was platted and recorded in 1838 by the Gibraltar and Flat Rock Land Co. They were attempting to build a canal to connect Lake Erie with Lake Michigan. This effort ultimately failed.

Henry Ford was attracted to the water power of the Huron River, and in 1925 he established the Ford Motor Company Lamp Factory along its banks. The Flat Rock Dam was constructed to provide hydroelectricity to the factory.

The area was incorporated as a village in 1923 and as a city in 1965.

On January 25, 1979, Robert Williams was struck and killed by the arm of a robotic transfer vehicle while working at the Ford Motor Company's Michigan Casting Center located in Flat Rock, marking the first known human to be killed by a robot.

In 2021, Ford Motor Company dumped benzene into the city sewer system, causing 1,100 people to evacuate their homes.

== Geography ==
Flat Rock is in southern Wayne County, but a very small portion of the city lies to the south in Monroe County, because the border along the Huron River follows the course of the river in 1923, the year Flat Rock was incorporated as a village. At the time, the river had two meanders, but they have since been filled in. The city is bordered to the northeast by Woodhaven, to the southeast by Rockwood, and to the south, across the Huron River in Monroe County, by South Rockwood.

U.S. Route 24 (Telegraph Road) passes through the center of Flat Rock, leading north 14 miles (23 km) to the western part of Dearborn and southwest the same distance to Monroe. Interstate 75 runs along the eastern border of Flat Rock, with direct access from Exit 29 (Gibraltar Road). I-75 leads northeast 21 miles (34 km) to Detroit and southwest 35 miles (56 km) to Toledo, Ohio.

According to the U.S. Census Bureau, the city of Flat Rock has a total area of 6.71 square miles (17.38 km^{2}), of which 6.57 square miles (17.02 km^{2}) are land and 0.14 square miles (0.36 km^{2}), or 2.06%, are water.

The city is listed by the U.S. Census Bureau as belonging to both Wayne County and Monroe County. In the 2010 census, the city is listed as having a total land area of 6.67 square miles (17.28 km^{2}), while mentioning no measurable land area or population statistics within Monroe County. However, the city is still listed in several categories as being part of Monroe County. The official Flat Rock city website also mentions the city's boundaries extending into Monroe County.

Flat Rock has a higher overall tornado average than the state of Michigan as a whole, and a 40% greater average than the United States as a whole. Two F4 tornadoes have hit Flat Rock—one in 1956 and another in 1965 resulting in 23 deaths and over 300 injuries.

== Economy ==
In December 2019 Flat Rock had an unemployment rate of 6.5%, higher than the US average of 3.7%. Per capita income in Flat Rock was $27,549, below the US average of $31,177. The average household income was $63,375, above the US average of $57,652. The family median income was $76,481, above the US average of $70,850.

== Demographics ==
Historical population
Census	Pop.	Note	%±
1880	373		—
1930	1,231		—
1940	1,467		19.2%
1950	1,931		31.6%
1960	4,696		143.2%
1970	5,643		20.2%
1980	6,853		21.4%
1990	7,290		6.4%
2000	8,488		16.4%
2010	9,878		16.4%
2020	10,541		6.7%
U.S. Decennial Census

=== Racial and ethnic composition ===
Flat Rock city, Michigan – Racial and ethnic composition Note: the US Census treats Hispanic/Latino as an ethnic category. This table excludes Latinos from the racial categories and assigns them to a separate category. Hispanics/Latinos may be of any race.
Race / Ethnicity (NH = Non-Hispanic)	Pop 2000	Pop 2010	Pop 2020	% 2000	% 2010	% 2020
White alone (NH)	7,927	8,671	8,577	93.39%	87.78%	81.37%
Black or African American alone (NH)	119	400	578	1.40%	4.05%	5.48%
Native American or Alaska Native alone (NH)	35	38	28	0.41%	0.38%	0.27%
Asian alone (NH)	40	83	79	0.47%	0.84%	0.75%
Native Hawaiian or Pacific Islander alone (NH)	0	1	6	0.00%	0.01%	0.06%
Other race alone (NH)	16	3	36	0.19%	0.03%	0.34%
Mixed race or Multiracial (NH)	122	246	612	1.44%	2.49%	5.81%
Hispanic or Latino (any race)	229	436	625	2.70%	4.41%	5.93%
Total	8,488	9,878	10,541	100.00%	100.00%	100.00%

=== 2020 census ===
As of the 2020 census, Flat Rock had a population of 10,541. The median age was 38.9 years. 25.2% of residents were under the age of 18 and 14.0% of residents were 65 years of age or older. For every 100 females, there were 92.3 males, and for every 100 females age 18 and over there were 90.7 males age 18 and over.

100.0% of residents lived in urban areas, while 0.0% lived in rural areas.

There were 4,033 households in Flat Rock, of which 36.9% had children under the age of 18 living in them. Of all households, 48.3% were married-couple households, 16.2% were households with a male householder and no spouse or partner present, and 28.9% were households with a female householder and no spouse or partner present. About 25.2% of all households were made up of individuals and 10.9% had someone living alone who was 65 years of age or older.

There were 4,212 housing units, of which 4.2% were vacant. The homeowner vacancy rate was 1.5% and the rental vacancy rate was 6.4%.

=== 2010 census ===
As of the census of 2010, there were 9,878 people, 3,754 households, and 2,684 families living in the city. The population density was 1,512.7 inhabitants per square mile (584.1/km^{2}). There were 3,995 housing units at an average density of 611.8 per square mile (236.2/km^{2}). The racial makeup of the city was 91.1% White, 4.1% African American, 0.5% Native American, 0.8% Asian, 0.6% from other races, and 2.9% from two or more races. Hispanic or Latino of any race were 4.4% of the population.

There were 3,754 households, of which 38.9% had children under the age of 18 living with them, 49.8% were married couples living together, 16.6% had a female householder with no husband present, 5.1% had a male householder with no wife present, and 28.5% were non-families. 23.6% of all households were made up of individuals, and 8.1% had someone living alone who was 65 years of age or older. The average household size was 2.62 and the average family size was 3.10.

The median age in the city was 36.9 years. 27.4% of residents were under 18; 8.4% were between the ages of 18 and 24; 26.6% were from 25 to 44; 27.1% were from 45 to 64; and 10.4% were 65 years of age or older. The gender makeup of the city was 48.1% male and 51.9% female.

=== 2000 census ===
As of the census of 2000, there were 8,488 people, 3,181 households, and 2,306 families living in the city. The population density was 1,266.9 inhabitants per square mile (489.2/km^{2}). There were 3,291 housing units at an average density of 491.2 per square mile (189.7/km^{2}). The racial makeup of the city was 95.32% White, 1.43% African American, 0.49% Native American, 0.47% Asian, 0.64% from other races, and 1.65% from two or more races. Hispanic or Latino of any race were 2.70% of the population.

There were 3,181 households, out of which 39.8% had children under 18 living with them, 51.7% were married couples living together, 16.6% had a female householder with no husband present, and 27.5% were non-families. 22.9% of all households were made up of individuals, and 8.6% had someone living alone who was 65 years of age or older. The average household size was 2.66 and the average family size was 3.12.

The population was spread out in the city, with 29.3% under 18, 10.1% from 18 to 24, 30.3% from 25 to 44, 20.8% from 45 to 64, and 9.5% who were 65 years of age or older. The median age was 33 years. For every 100 females, there were 93.9 males. For every 100 females age 18 and over, there were 87.7 males.

The median income for a household in the city was $44,084, and the median income for a family was $54,186. Males had a median income of $43,967 versus $27,348 for females. The per capita income for the city was $21,256. About 8.5% of families and 8.8% of the population were below the poverty line, including 11.3% of those under age 18 and 4.8% of those age 65 or over.

== Notable people ==
- Dann Florek, actor
- Fred Gladding, Major League Baseball pitcher

== Education ==
Flat Rock is served by Flat Rock Community Schools.
