= South Rockwood, Michigan =

- Village
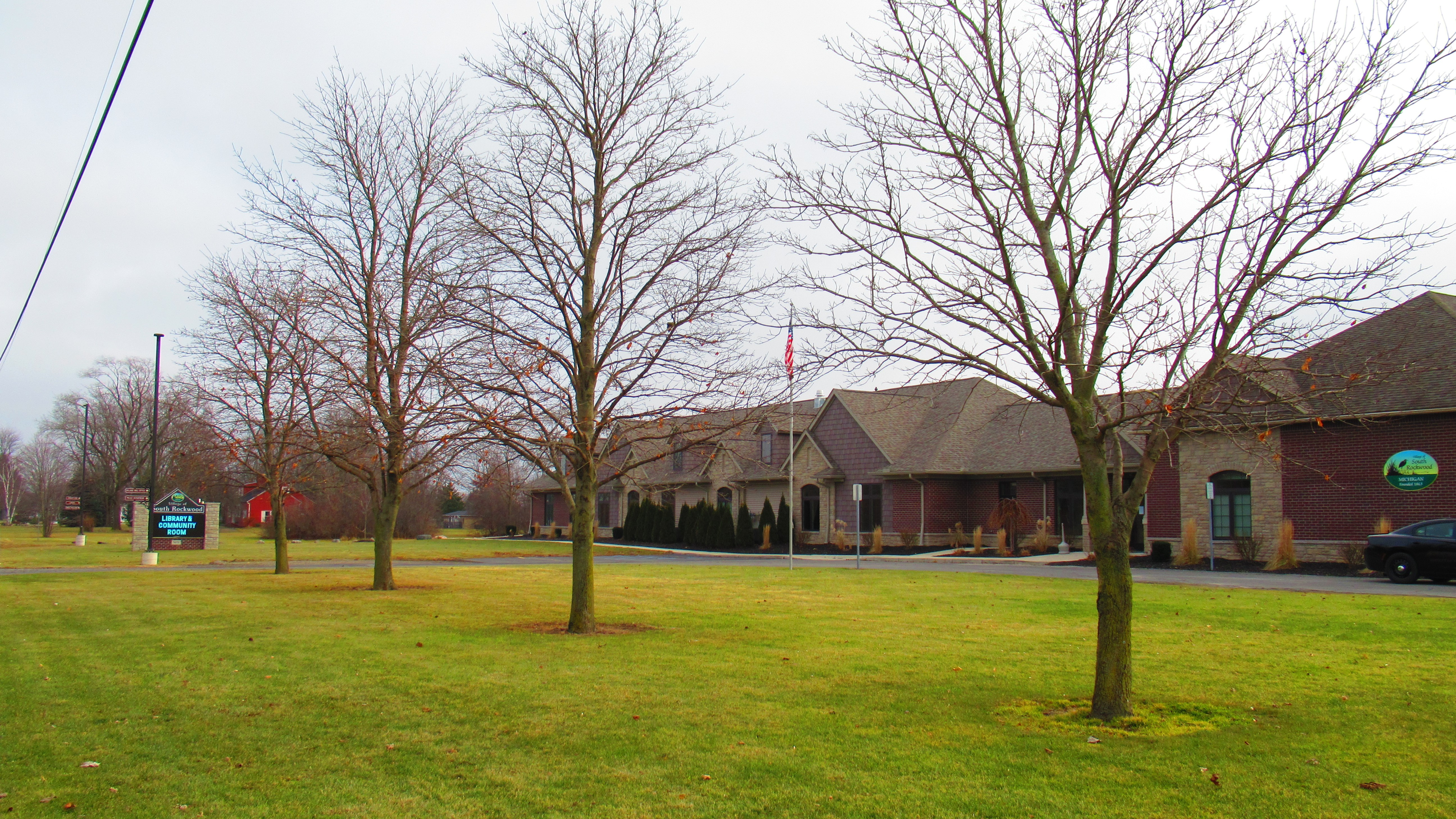
- South Rockwood Village Hall

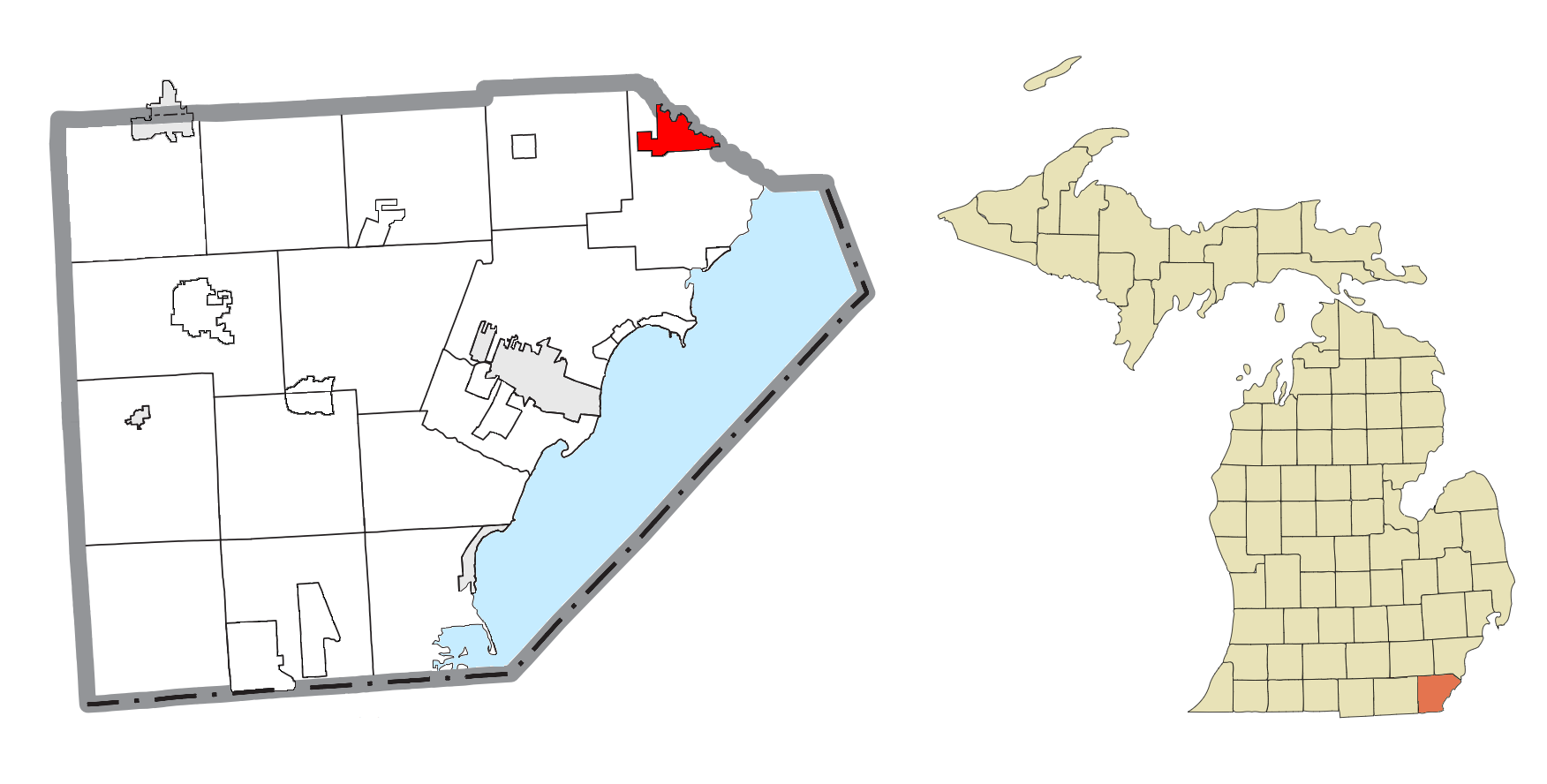
- Location within Monroe County and the state of Michigan

- Location within Michigan Location within the United States
- Coordinates: 42°03′50″N 83°15′40″W
- Country: United States
- State: Michigan
- County: Monroe
- Township: Berlin
- Founded: 1863
- Incorporated: 1955

Government
  - Type: Village council
  - President: Charles Horn
  - Clerk: Angela Hightower

Area
  - Total: 3.33 sq mi (8.62 km^{2})
  - Land: 3.27 sq mi (8.47 km^{2})
  - Water: 0.062 sq mi (0.16 km^{2})
- Elevation: 587 ft (179 m)

Population (2020)
  - Total: 1,587
  - Density: 484.6/sq mi (187.11/km^{2})
- Time zone: UTC-5 (Eastern (EST))
  - Summer (DST): UTC-4 (EDT)
- ZIP Code: 48179
- Area code: 734
- FIPS code: 26-75280
- GNIS feature ID: 0638409
- Website: villageofsouthrockwoodmi.com

South Rockwood is a village in Monroe County in the U.S. state of Michigan. The population was 1,587 at the 2020 census. The village is located within Berlin Charter Township.

== History ==
South Rockwood was founded in 1863 by John Strong, who named the community after Rockwood, Ontario. The nearby community of Rockwood was located just to the north and had been settled a few years earlier. Strong established the South Rockwood post office on July 5, 1877. South Rockwood incorporated as a village in 1955.

== Geography ==
South Rockwood is in the northeast corner of Monroe County, in the northern part of Berlin Charter Township. The Huron River forms the northern boundary of the village and county line with the city of Rockwood in Wayne County.

According to the U.S. Census Bureau, the village has a total area of 3.33 square miles (8.62 km^{2}), of which 3.27 square miles (8.47 km^{2}) are land and 0.06 square miles (0.16 km^{2}) (1.80%) are water.

=== Major highways ===
- I-75 runs south–north through the center of the village and is accessible via exit 26 (South Huron River Drive). The highway leads northeast 25 miles (40 km) to Detroit and southwest 33 miles (53 km) to Toledo, Ohio. Monroe, the Monroe county seat, is 13 miles (21 km) to the southwest.

== Demographics ==
Historical population
Census	Pop.	Note	%±
1880	251		—
1960	1,337		—
1970	1,477		10.5%
1980	1,353		−8.4%
1990	1,221		−9.8%
2000	1,284		5.2%
2010	1,675		30.5%
2020	1,587		−5.3%
U.S. Decennial Census

=== 2020 census ===
As of the 2020 census, South Rockwood had a population of 1,587. The median age was 44.5 years. 15.9% of residents were under the age of 18 and 20.4% of residents were 65 years of age or older. For every 100 females there were 105.6 males, and for every 100 females age 18 and over there were 103.2 males age 18 and over.

88.4% of residents lived in urban areas, while 11.6% lived in rural areas.

There were 726 households in South Rockwood, of which 21.2% had children under the age of 18 living in them. Of all households, 41.7% were married-couple households, 23.4% were households with a male householder and no spouse or partner present, and 26.2% were households with a female householder and no spouse or partner present. About 32.1% of all households were made up of individuals and 12.3% had someone living alone who was 65 years of age or older.

There were 768 housing units, of which 5.5% were vacant. The homeowner vacancy rate was 0.6% and the rental vacancy rate was 7.0%.

Racial composition as of the 2020 census
Race	Number	Percent
White	1,426	89.9%
Black or African American	40	2.5%
American Indian and Alaska Native	11	0.7%
Asian	5	0.3%
Native Hawaiian and Other Pacific Islander	0	0.0%
Some other race	5	0.3%
Two or more races	100	6.3%
Hispanic or Latino (of any race)	48	3.0%

=== 2010 census ===
As of the census of 2010, there were 1,675 people, 687 households, and 453 families living in the village. The population density was 712.8 inhabitants per square mile (275.2/km^{2}). There were 734 housing units at an average density of 312.3 per square mile (120.6/km^{2}). The racial makeup of the village was 95.4% White, 2.3% African American, 0.2% Native American, 0.4% Asian, 0.4% from other races, and 1.3% from two or more races. Hispanic or Latino of any race were 4.1% of the population.

There were 687 households, of which 30.0% had children under the age of 18 living with them, 50.4% were married couples living together, 11.5% had a female householder with no husband present, 4.1% had a male householder with no wife present, and 34.1% were non-families. 25.6% of all households were made up of individuals, and 6.2% had someone living alone who was 65 years of age or older. The average household size was 2.44 and the average family size was 2.95.

The median age in the village was 38.9 years. 20.8% of residents were under the age of 18; 8.9% were between the ages of 18 and 24; 29% were from 25 to 44; 31.1% were from 45 to 64; and 10.1% were 65 years of age or older. The gender makeup of the village was 50.7% male and 49.3% female.

=== 2000 census ===
As of the census of 2000, there were 1,284 people, 450 households, and 359 families living in the village. The population density was 526.1 inhabitants per square mile (203.1/km^{2}). There were 464 housing units at an average density of 190.1 per square mile (73.4/km^{2}). The racial makeup of the village was 97.59% White, 0.23% African American, 0.23% Native American, 0.08% Asian, 0.08% from other races, and 1.79% from two or more races. Hispanic or Latino of any race were 0.78% of the population.

There were 450 households, out of which 37.3% had children under the age of 18 living with them, 66.9% were married couples living together, 8.9% had a female householder with no husband present, and 20.2% were non-families. 14.9% of all households were made up of individuals, and 5.8% had someone living alone who was 65 years of age or older. The average household size was 2.85 and the average family size was 3.18.

In the village, the population was spread out, with 26.6% under the age of 18, 9.0% from 18 to 24, 29.0% from 25 to 44, 26.3% from 45 to 64, and 9.0% who were 65 years of age or older. The median age was 37 years. For every 100 females, there were 109.8 males. For every 100 females age 18 and over, there were 102.6 males.

The median income for a household in the village was $62,500, and the median income for a family was $68,304. Males had a median income of $50,882 versus $27,813 for females. The per capita income for the village was $22,245. About 2.3% of families and 4.1% of the population were below the poverty line, including 2.9% of those under age 18 and 4.8% of those age 65 or over.

== Education ==
The village is served by Airport Community Schools.
