= Rockwood, Michigan =

- City
- City of Rockwood
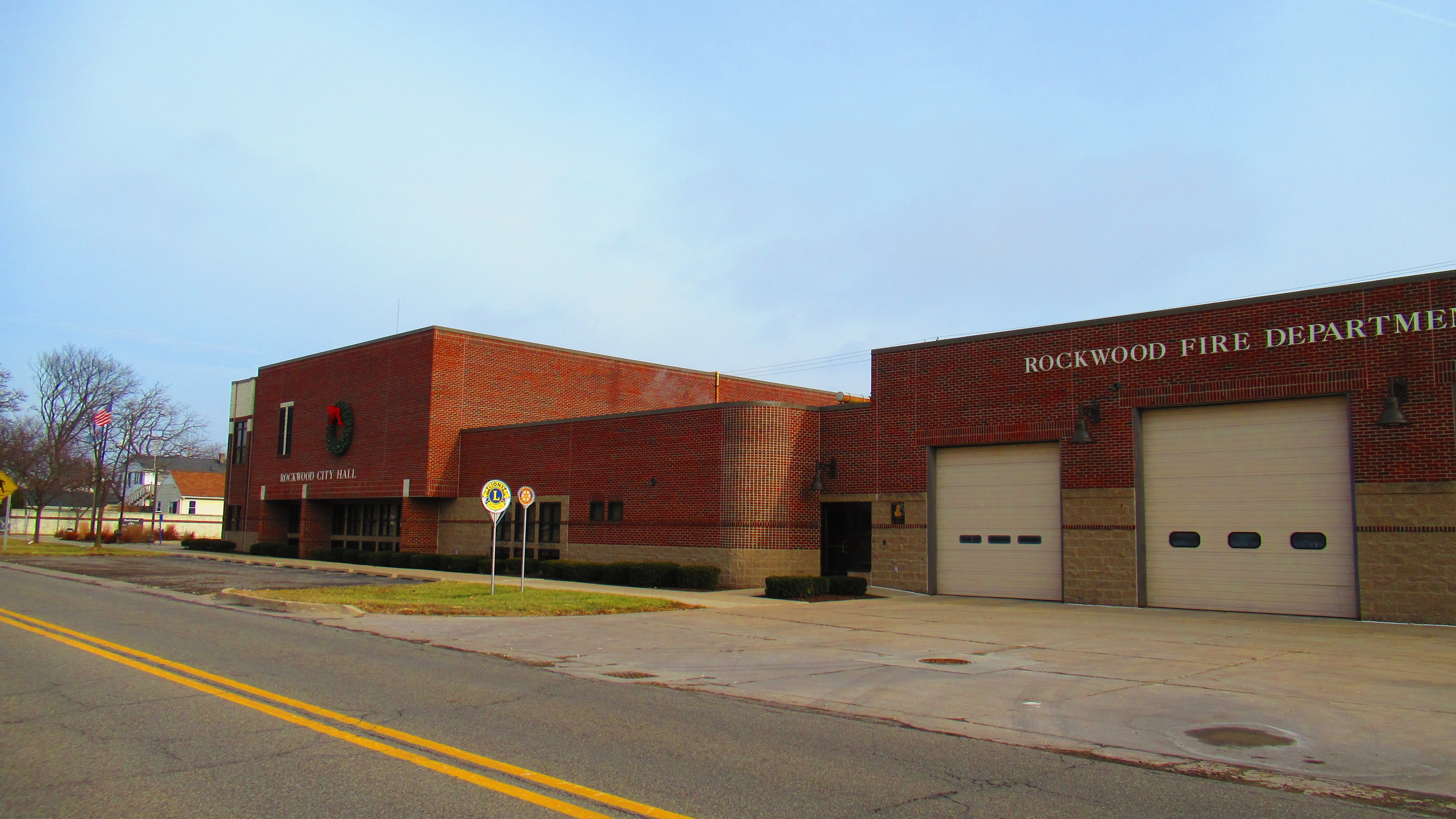
- Rockwood City Hall and Fire Department

- Location within Wayne County

- Location within the state of Michigan Location within the United States
- Coordinates: 42°04′20″N 83°14′40″W
- Country: United States
- State: Michigan
- County: Wayne
- Established: 1861

Government
  - Mayor: Troy Cox

Area
  - City: 2.70 sq mi (7.00 km^{2})
  - Land: 2.52 sq mi (6.53 km^{2})
  - Water: 0.18 sq mi (0.47 km^{2})
- Elevation: 584 ft (178 m)

Population (2020)
  - City: 3,240
  - Density: 1,284.8/sq mi (496.08/km^{2})
  - Metro: 4,285,832 (Metro Detroit)
- Time zone: UTC-5 (EST)
  - Summer (DST): UTC-4 (EDT)
- ZIP code(s): 48173
- Area code: 734
- FIPS code: 26-69180
- GNIS feature ID: 0636095
- Website: rockwoodmi.org

Rockwood is a city in Wayne County in the U.S. state of Michigan. A Downriver suburb of Detroit, Rockwood is located roughly 23 miles (37.0 km) southwest of downtown Detroit. As of the 2020 census, Rockwood had a population of 3,240.

== Geography ==
According to the United States Census Bureau, the city has a total area of 2.65 square miles (6.86 km^{2}), of which 2.52 square miles (6.53 km^{2}) is land and 0.13 square miles (0.34 km^{2}) is water.

== Demographics ==
Historical population
Census	Pop.	Note	%±
1930	953		—
1940	1,147		20.4%
1950	1,044		−9.0%
1960	2,026		94.1%
1970	3,225		59.2%
1980	3,346		3.8%
1990	3,141		−6.1%
2000	3,442		9.6%
2010	3,289		−4.4%
2020	3,240		−1.5%
U.S. Decennial Census

=== Racial and ethnic composition ===
Rockwood city, Michigan – Racial and ethnic composition Note: the US Census treats Hispanic/Latino as an ethnic category. This table excludes Latinos from the racial categories and assigns them to a separate category. Hispanics/Latinos may be of any race.
Race / Ethnicity (NH = Non-Hispanic)	Pop 2000	Pop 2010	Pop 2020	% 2000	% 2010	% 2020
White alone (NH)	3,233	3,047	2,884	93.93%	92.64%	89.01%
Black or African American alone (NH)	22	53	47	0.64%	1.61%	1.45%
Native American or Alaska Native alone (NH)	34	28	16	0.99%	0.85%	0.49%
Asian alone (NH)	21	29	24	0.61%	0.88%	0.74%
Native Hawaiian or Pacific Islander alone (NH)	0	0	2	0.00%	0.00%	0.06%
Other race alone (NH)	7	2	4	0.20%	0.06%	0.12%
Mixed race or Multiracial (NH)	38	41	143	1.10%	1.25%	4.41%
Hispanic or Latino (any race)	87	89	120	2.53%	2.71%	3.70%
Total	3,442	3,289	3,240	100.00%	100.00%	100.00%

=== 2020 census ===
As of the 2020 census, Rockwood had a population of 3,240. The median age was 42.7 years. 19.7% of residents were under the age of 18 and 19.2% of residents were 65 years of age or older. For every 100 females there were 104.9 males, and for every 100 females age 18 and over there were 102.7 males age 18 and over.

100.0% of residents lived in urban areas, while 0.0% lived in rural areas.

There were 1,337 households in Rockwood, of which 28.6% had children under the age of 18 living in them. Of all households, 48.2% were married-couple households, 21.5% were households with a male householder and no spouse or partner present, and 23.2% were households with a female householder and no spouse or partner present. About 28.9% of all households were made up of individuals and 11.0% had someone living alone who was 65 years of age or older.

There were 1,390 housing units, of which 3.8% were vacant. The homeowner vacancy rate was 1.6% and the rental vacancy rate was 5.3%.

Racial composition as of the 2020 census
Race	Number	Percent
White	2,925	90.3%
Black or African American	47	1.5%
American Indian and Alaska Native	20	0.6%
Asian	25	0.8%
Native Hawaiian and Other Pacific Islander	2	0.1%
Some other race	22	0.7%
Two or more races	199	6.1%

=== 2010 census ===
As of the census of 2010, there were 3,289 people, 1,295 households, and 900 families living in the city. The population density was 1,305.2 inhabitants per square mile (503.9/km^{2}). There were 1,387 housing units at an average density of 550.4 per square mile (212.5/km^{2}). The racial makeup of the city was 94.6% White, 1.7% African American, 0.9% Native American, 0.9% Asian, 0.4% from other races, and 1.5% from two or more races. Hispanic or Latino of any race were 2.7% of the population.

There were 1,295 households, of which 32.1% had children under the age of 18 living with them, 52.0% were married couples living together, 12.4% had a female householder with no husband present, 5.1% had a male householder with no wife present, and 30.5% were non-families. 25.9% of all households were made up of individuals, and 8.6% had someone living alone who was 65 years of age or older. The average household size was 2.52 and the average family size was 3.04.

The median age in the city was 40.9 years. 23% of residents were under the age of 18; 8.4% were between the ages of 18 and 24; 24.7% were from 25 to 44; 31.8% were from 45 to 64; and 12% were 65 years of age or older. The gender makeup of the city was 50.1% male and 49.9% female.

=== 2000 census ===
As of the census of 2000, there were 3,442 people, 1,318 households, and 929 families living in the city. The population density was 1,272.9 inhabitants per square mile (491.5/km^{2}). There were 1,353 housing units at an average density of 500.3 per square mile (193.2/km^{2}). The racial makeup of the city was 95.64% White, 0.64% African American, 0.99% Native American, 0.61% Asian, 0.96% from other races, and 1.16% from two or more races. Hispanic or Latino of any race were 2.53% of the population.

There were 1,318 households, out of which 33.4% had children under the age of 18 living with them, 55.8% were married couples living together, 10.2% had a female householder with no husband present, and 29.5% were non-families. 24.2% of all households were made up of individuals, and 8.2% had someone living alone who was 65 years of age or older. The average household size was 2.60 and the average family size was 3.10.

In the city, the population was spread out, with 24.7% under the age of 18, 9.6% from 18 to 24, 30.1% from 25 to 44, 26.2% from 45 to 64, and 9.4% who were 65 years of age or older. The median age was 36 years. For every 100 females, there were 103.4 males. For every 100 females age 18 and over, there were 101.2 males.

The median income for a household in the city was $55,987, and the median income for a family was $59,677. Males had a median income of $51,977 versus $30,684 for females. The per capita income for the city was $23,563. About 2.3% of families and 4.0% of the population were below the poverty line, including 3.7% of those under age 18 and none of those age 65 or over.

== Government ==
Rockwood uses a city council consisting of seven council members including the mayor. Mayor Troy Cox was elected to office in November 2025.

== Education ==
Rockwood is in the Gibraltar School District.
