= Calf Island (Michigan) =

Island in Michigan, United States

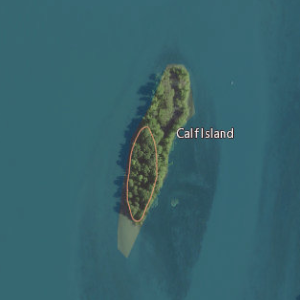
- USGS aerial imagery of Calf Island

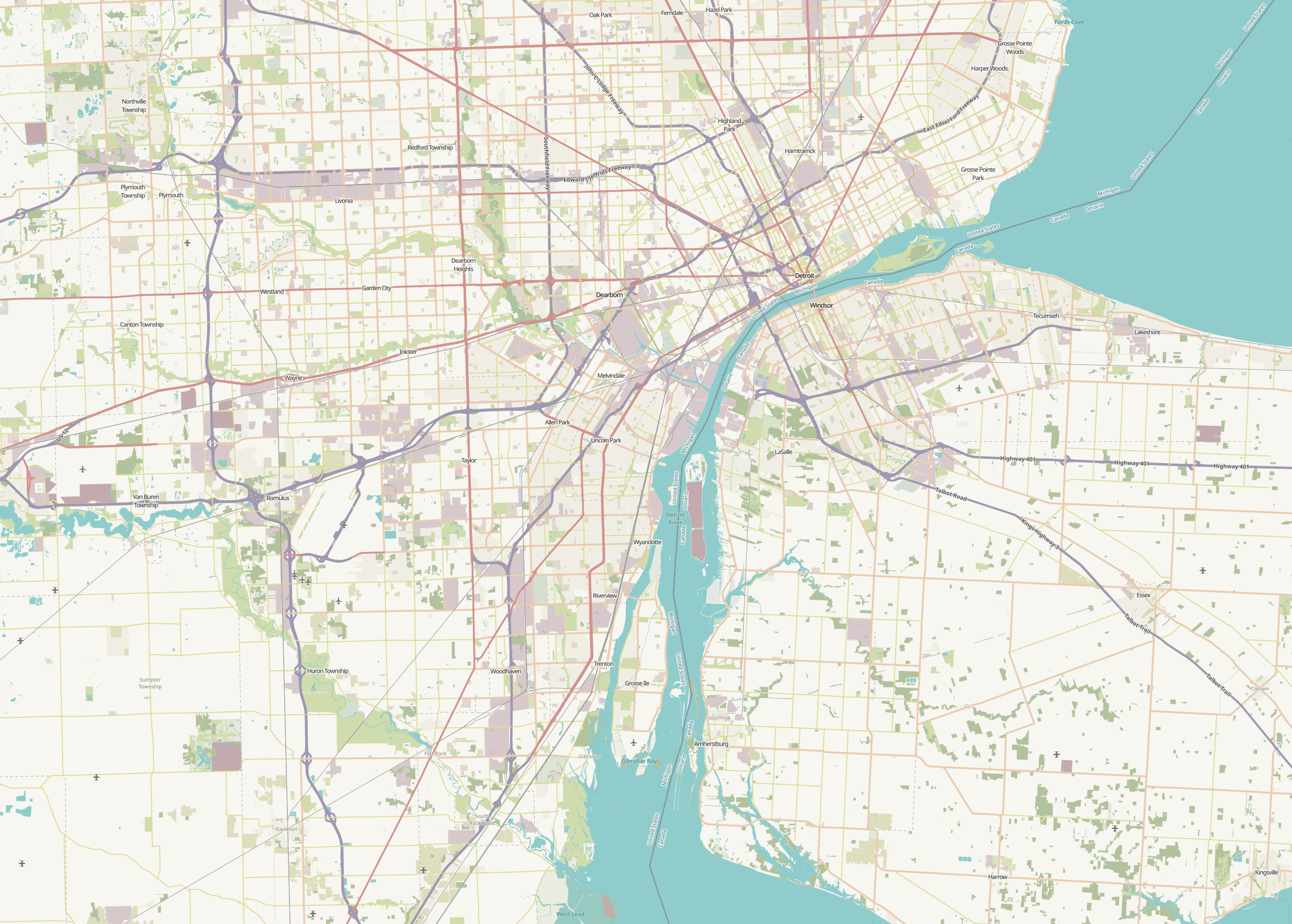
- Location within Wayne County, Michigan Location within Michigan

Geography
- Location: Detroit River
- Coordinates: 42°06′11″N 83°10′45″W
- Area: 7 acres (2.8 ha)

Administration
- United States
- State: Michigan
- County: Wayne County
- Township: Grosse Ile Township

Demographics
- Population: Uninhabited

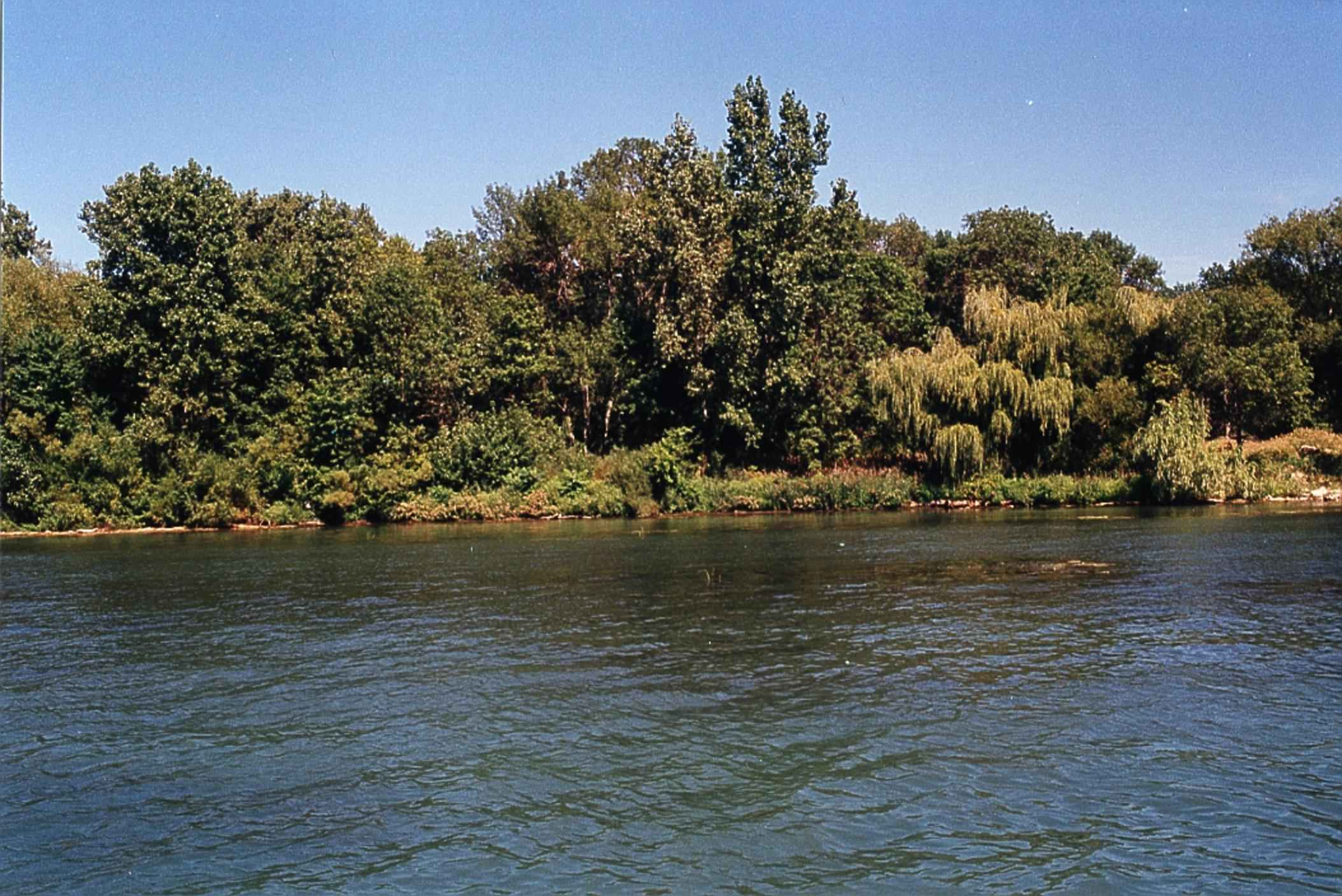
The coastline of Calf Island

Calf Island /ˈkæf/ is an island in the Detroit River, in Michigan. It has a surface elevation of 571 ft (174 m). It is located in the Trenton Channel, about 1,000 ft (300 m) west of the southern tip of Grosse Ile and Swan Island, and Hamburg Island is just to the northwest. The 7-acre (2.8 ha) island is administered locally by Grosse Ile Township.

Added in 2002, Calf Island was one of the newer additions to the Detroit River International Wildlife Refuge. Under the refuge, the Michigan Department of Natural Resources and Ontario Ministry of Natural Resources identifies more than 29 species of waterfowl and 65 kinds of fish that make their home in and around the waters of Calf Island. The island often serves as a nesting location for a small number of herons. Calf Island is the smallest property added to the refuge, and the island has remained relatively isolated and unused compared to other areas in the region.

== See also ==
- Detroit River International Wildlife Refuge
- List of islands of Michigan
- List of islands in the Detroit River
