= Detroit River International Wildlife Refuge =

Wildlife refuge in Canada and the U.S.

- IUCN category IV (habitat/species management area)
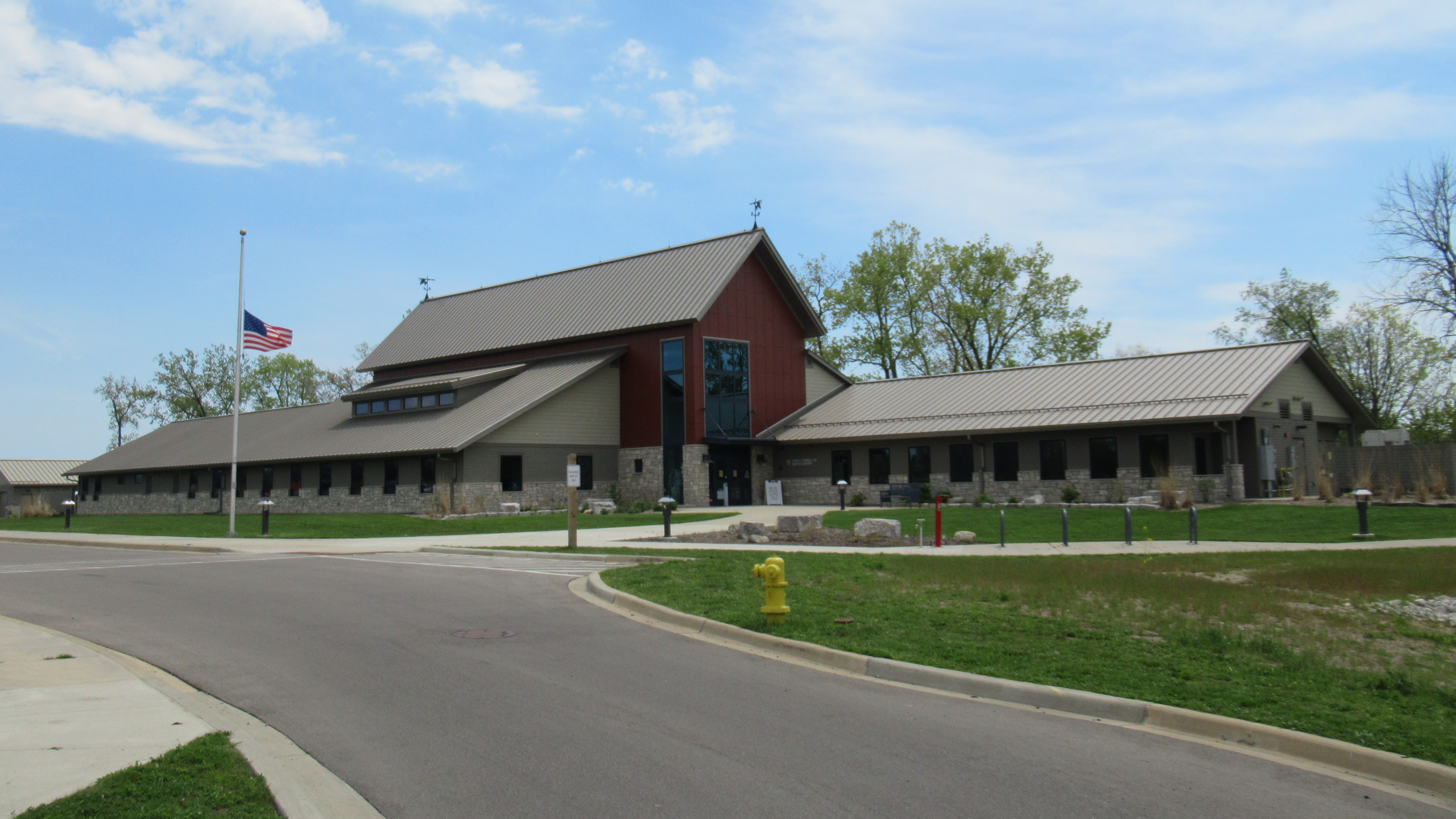
- John D. Dingell Jr. Visitor Center in Trenton

- Location within Michigan Location within the United States
- Location: Detroit River / West Lake Erie
- Coordinates: 42°13′N 83°08′W
- Area: 5,868 acres (23.75 km^{2})
- Established: December 21, 2001
- Governing body: U.S. Fish and Wildlife Service; Canadian Wildlife Service
- Website: Official website

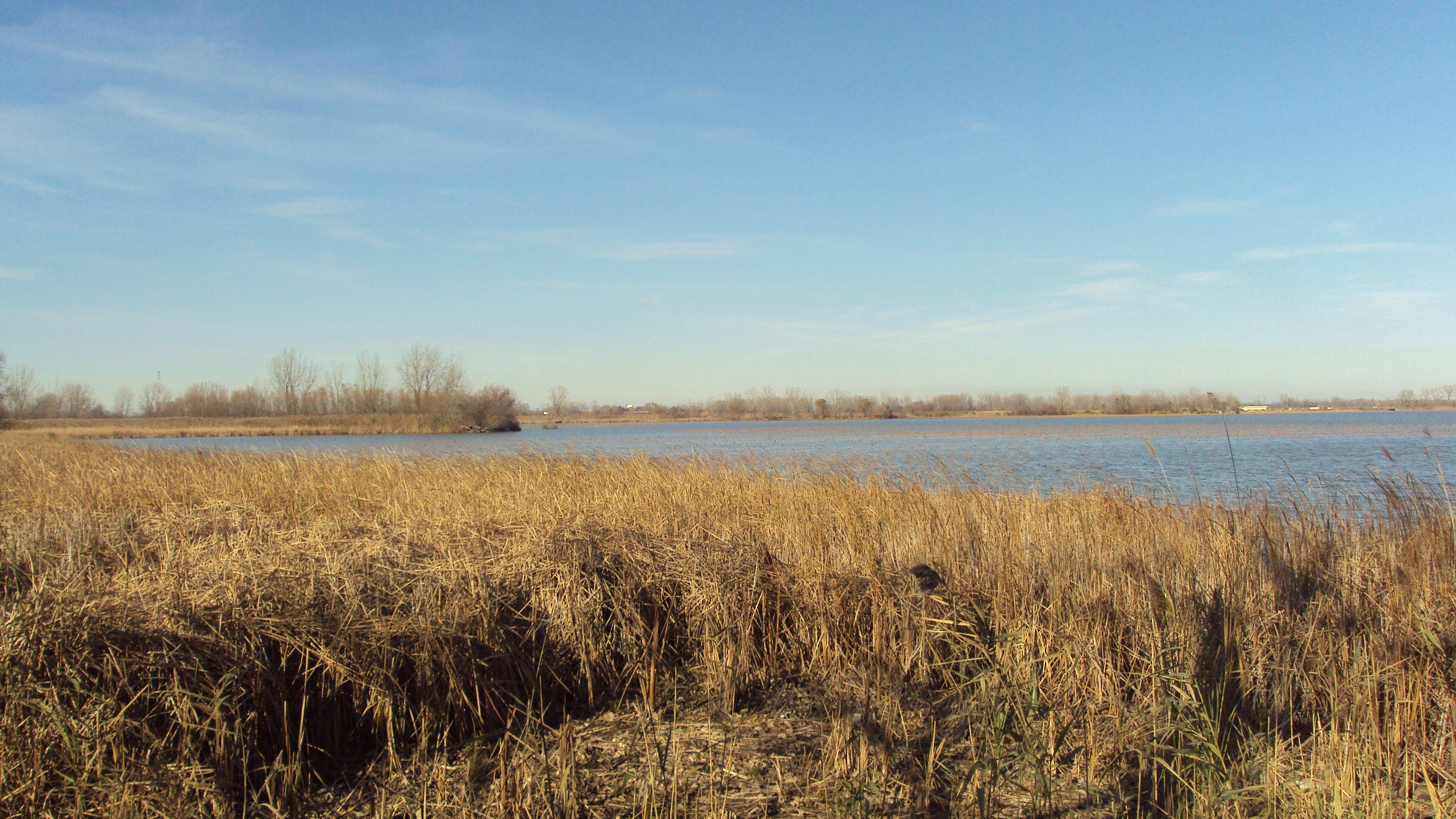
North Maumee Bay Archeological District

The Detroit River International Wildlife Refuge is the only international wildlife refuge in North America. Established in 2001 and managed jointly by the United States Fish and Wildlife Service and the Canadian Wildlife Service, it is located in a major metropolitan area. The Detroit River International Wildlife Refuge is one of over 540 National Wildlife Refuges managed by the U.S. Fish and Wildlife Service within the Department of the Interior. It occupies 7.88 square miles (20.41 km^{2}) of scattered property but has drawn boundaries for further expansion.

The Detroit River International Wildlife Refuge consists primarily of coastal wetlands, several islands in the Detroit River, and waterfront parks. The refuge includes islands, marshes, shoals, and waterfront lands along 48 miles (77 km) of the Detroit River and Western Lake Erie shoreline. It also includes Humbug Marsh, a wetland in southeastern Wayne County, which is classified as a wetland of international importance.

== History ==
Much of the land surrounding the Detroit River is urbanized and, in some places, heavily industrialized. This has resulted in excessive water pollution from the unregulated dumping of chemicals and industrial waste for many decades. Much of the garbage and sewage from Detroit's rapid industrialization found its way into the river. Much of the Detroit River and its shoreline were heavily polluted and unsafe for recreational use. Large quantities of this pollution collected around the mouth of the Detroit River at Lake Erie. The pollutants were so high after the spring thaw that thousands of migrating birds were killed by oil slicks and contaminated water every year. Oxygen levels in the river were depleted to the point where fish were unable to inhabit its waters. Because much of this pollution drained into and affected Lake Erie, portions of the lake itself were considered "dead" and unable to support aquatic life. Swimming in the water or consuming any of its remaining fish were considered health risks.

In 1961, the Wyandotte National Wildlife Refuge was founded by congressional order thanks in part to Michigan politician John Lesinski, Jr., who was Michigan's 16th congressional district representative from 1951 to 1965. The refuge paved the way for tighter restrictions on industries and allocated much needed government funding to clean up the river. However, there was little support from Detroit businesses toward cleaning up the river, because it would negatively affect Detroit's industrialism and economy. In 1970, the entire fishing industry in the St. Clair River, Lake St. Clair, the Detroit River, and Lake Erie had to be temporarily closed due to toxic levels of mercury found in the water. This caused the fishing industry and all those related to lose substantial amounts of money. This, in turn, spurred a massive conservation effort aimed at cleaning up the Detroit River. For years before, conservation efforts were halted by the enormous multimillion-dollar cost of removing pollutants from the river. In addition to that, industries, which had significant political influence, detested the regulations necessary to lessen the amount of pollutants in the river. The Wyandotte National Wildlife Refuge was very small though and only occupied the area surrounding Grassy Island, and the refuge's existence could not prevent Grassy Island from becoming highly contaminated from toxic soil dredged from the nearby River Rouge.

In 2001, the Wyandotte National Wildlife Refuge was absorbed into the much larger Detroit River International Wildlife Refuge, which was largely advocated by veteran Michigan representative John Dingell. The refuge was officially signed into law as the Detroit River International Wildlife Refuge Establishment Act (H.R. 1230) by President George W. Bush on December 21, 2001. The Congressional Budget Office originally estimated that the creation of the Detroit River International Wildlife Refuge would cost between $13–21 million over the first five years, in which the majority of the money spent would be through land acquisitions.

Millions of dollars so far have been used for land acquisitions and to improve the environment around the river. The recent cleaning up and restoration of the Detroit River is remarkable, although other problems are still at hand. Today, many species of native animals—some endangered species—are returning to the area after being driven out by human development. The Detroit River is home to a growing number of bird species, such as eagles (including reintroduced bald eagles), ospreys, and peregrine falcons. Fish species in abundance in the area include lake whitefish, sturgeon, salmon, perch, and walleye. Numerous mammal species also occupy the coastline throughout the refuge. The area serves as a vital migratory route and resting place for countless species of birds. Over 30 species of waterfowl, 17 species of raptors, 31 species of shorebirds, 160 species of songbirds, and 117 species of fish live along or regularly migrate through the Detroit River.

== Current area ==
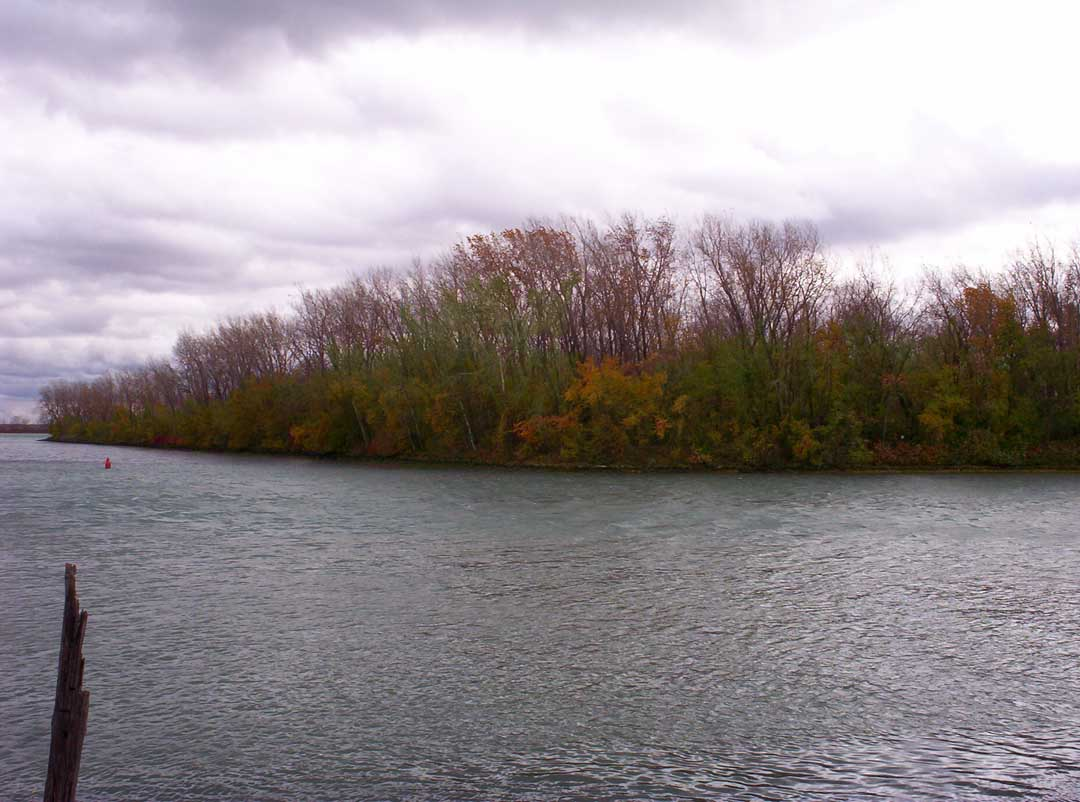
Mud Island in Ecorse, Michigan, is the northernmost portion of the refuge.

Ford Marsh Unit, Detroit River International Wildlife Refuge, Monroe County, Michigan -- a 242-acre coastal wetland donated by Ford Motor Company in 2010, among the last remaining Great Lakes coastal wetlands in the region

At its inception, the Detroit River International Wildlife Refuge included only areas that were part of the former Wyandotte National Wildlife Refuge. This included only 304 acres (123 hectares) surrounding Grassy Island and Mamajuda Island just north of Grosse Ile in the Detroit River. Soon after, Mud Island just north of Grassy Island was donated to the refuge by the National Steel Corporation. The refuge continued to expand through land acquisitions to include Calf Island in 2002. In 2003, the U.S. Fish and Wildlife Service stuck a cooperative agreement with DTE Energy to include portions of their properties into the refuge, including the Lagoona Beach Unit and Brancheau Unit of the Enrico Fermi Nuclear Generating Station. This was the refuge's first expansion into Monroe County along the coast of Lake Erie. Other areas in Lake Erie extending as far south as the Michigan–Ohio border were eventually included into the Detroit River International Wildlife Refuge. Many of these lands were through cooperative management acquisitions, where the property would be included into the refuge but not owned directly by the U.S. Fish and Wildlife Service.

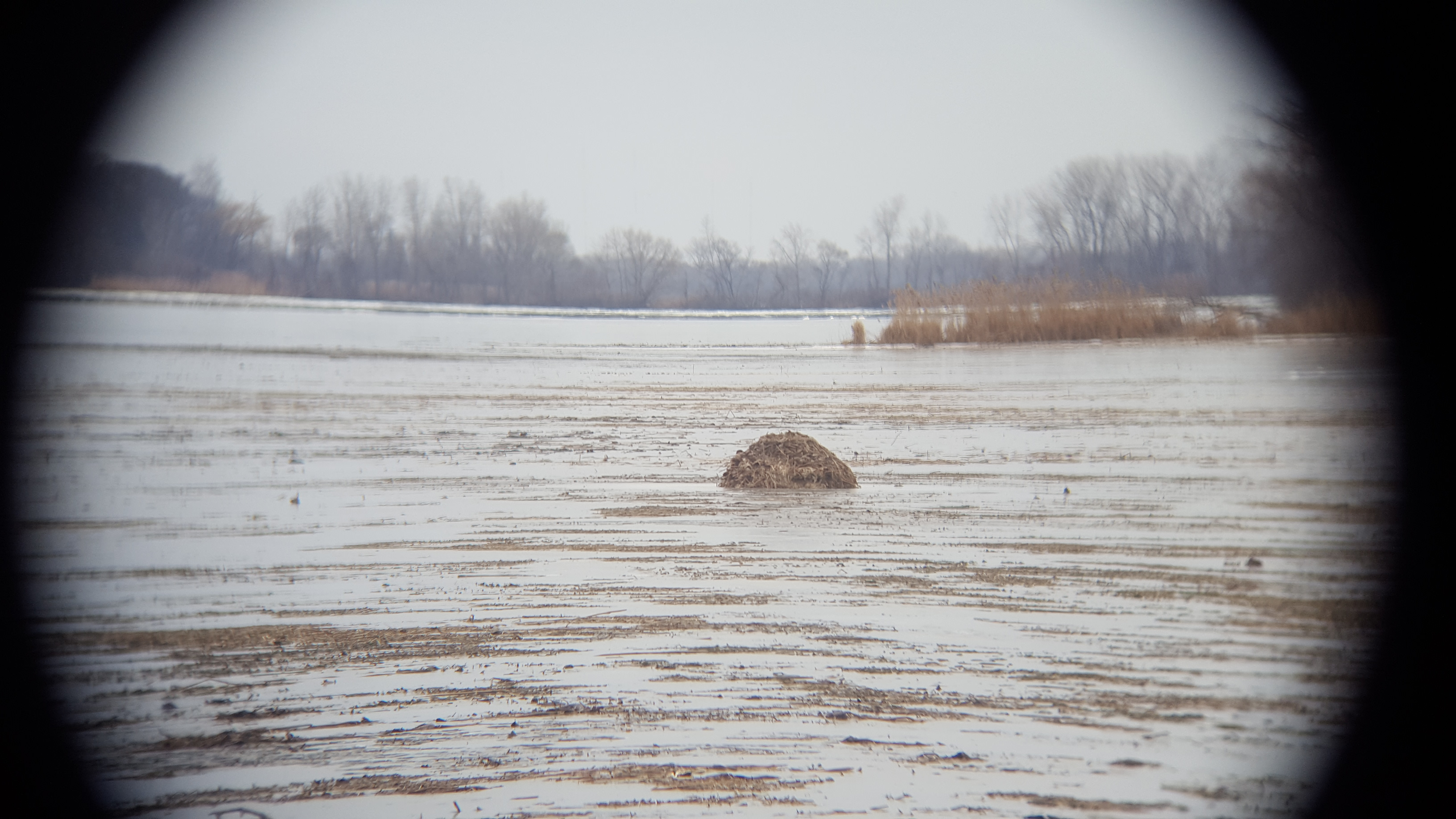
View of a muskrat lodge through permanent viewing telescope in Gibraltar Bay Unit on Grosse Ile

In 2004, the refuge grew to include Humbug Marsh, which is in Gibraltar and Trenton and also includes Humbug Island. At the same time, the refuge acquired the U.S. Army Corps of Engineers Strong Unit just north of Estral Beach. In 2005, the refuge acquired joint management over the 243-acre (98 ha) Eagle Island Marsh in Monroe, Michigan. This land is at the mouth of the River Raisin in between the Monroe Power Plant and Sterling State Park. This section, which was once very polluted, is owned by Automotive Components Holdings and is the location of a large Ford factory. In 2006, the refuge grew to include the 780-acre (315 ha) Lake Erie Metropark in Brownstown Charter Township. With the acquisition of the Erie Marsh in 2006, the refuge doubled its size to include the southern wetlands of Erie Township near the Ohio border, including Gard Island in the North Maumee Bay Archeological District. This was a major milestone for the Detroit River International Wildlife Refuge. The refuge grew from its original 304 acres (123 hectares) in 2001 to 5,047 acres (2,042 hectares) by 2007. The last of these acquisitions was an area referred to as Howard Fix at 65 acres (26 hectares). It is near the Enrico Fermi Nuclear Generating Station, but little has been published about this property.

The Refuge also owns the shoals around these islands and has entered into cooperative agreements with the U.S. Army Corps of Engineers and Detroit Edison, a local electricity company, to manage hundreds of acres of habitat on Lake Erie. Within the authorized boundaries of the Refuge are several existing parks including Elizabeth Park, Sterling State Park, Lake Erie Metropark, as well as Pointe Mouillee State Game Area and Erie State Game Area.

The headquarters of the Detroit River International Wildlife Refuge are in Grosse Ile Township, which is not officially listed as part of the refuge. In Canada, the Detroit River International Wildlife Refuge does not have any formal boundaries, and no Canadian portions of the Detroit River or Lake Erie are officially included into the refuge. All properties and potential future land acquisition sites are within the United States and governed by the U.S. Fish and Wildlife Service.

== Proposed expansion ==
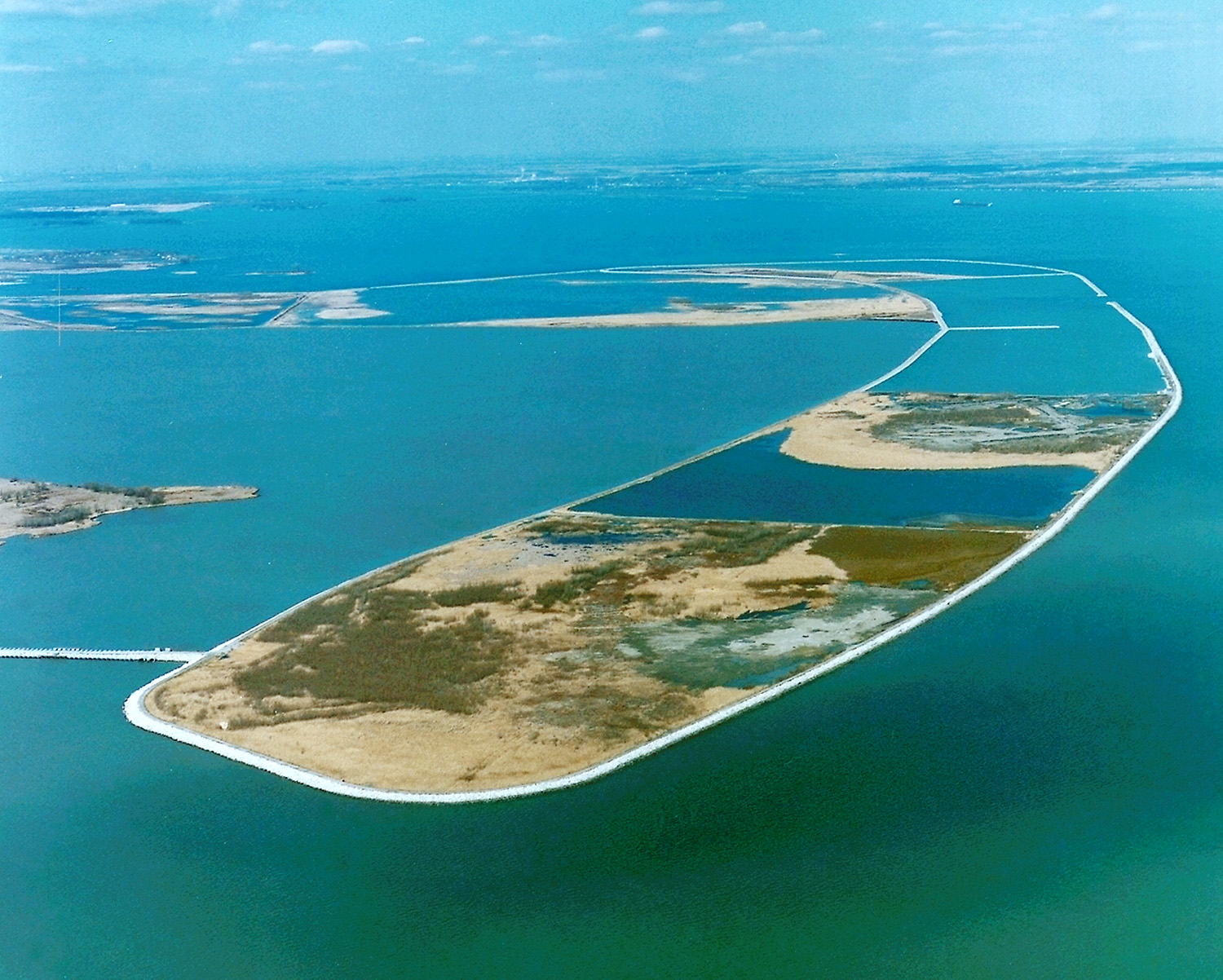
The Pointe Mouillee State Game Area

While the boundaries of the Detroit River International Wildlife Refuge encompass only 7.88 square miles (20.42 km^{2}) of property scattered along the west coast of the Detroit River and Lake Erie, the Department of the Interior has approved of future land acquisitions by the U.S. Fish and Wildlife Service totaling 18.75 square miles (48.56 km^{2}) of land and water. Expanding the territory through land acquisitions is a top priority for the refuge. The expansion of the refuge is limited due to finances and the fact that most areas within the proposed range are privately owned. Most of the land within the Detroit River International Wildlife Refuge is jointly operated by individual landowners and the federal government. The expansion could also include areas of significant permanent populations, such as the islands of Grosse Ile Township, the riverfronts of several Downriver communities, Berlin and Frenchtown charter townships, and Monroe.

The proposed range stretches for 48 miles from the southern border of Detroit at Zug Island in the city of River Rouge south all the way to the Michigan–Ohio border. The expansion would not include any areas within the city limits of Detroit. Potential areas within this realm include Zug Island, Grosse Ile, Elizabeth Park, Pointe Mouillee State Game Area, Sterling State Park, and Turtle Island. Potential Canadian additions to the Detroit River International Wildlife Refuge include the large Fighting Island, which has already undergone major recovery after serving as an industrial dumping ground for decades, Grass Island, Turkey Island, Crystal Island, and Bois Blanc Island.
