= Mud Island (Michigan) =

Island in Michigan

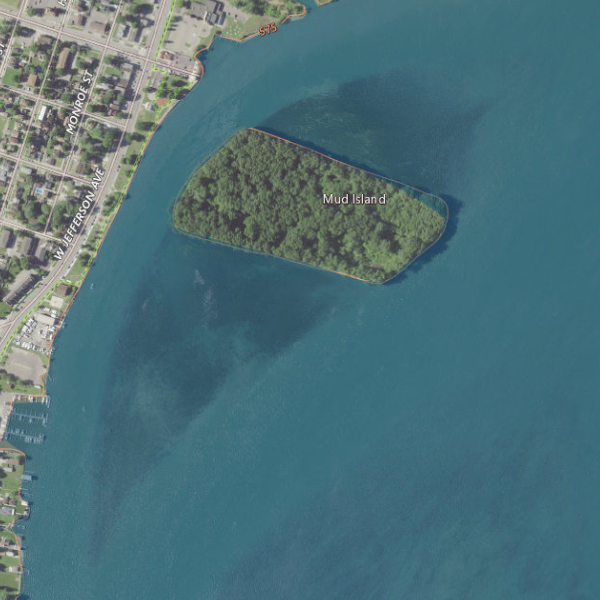
- USGS aerial imagery of Mud Island

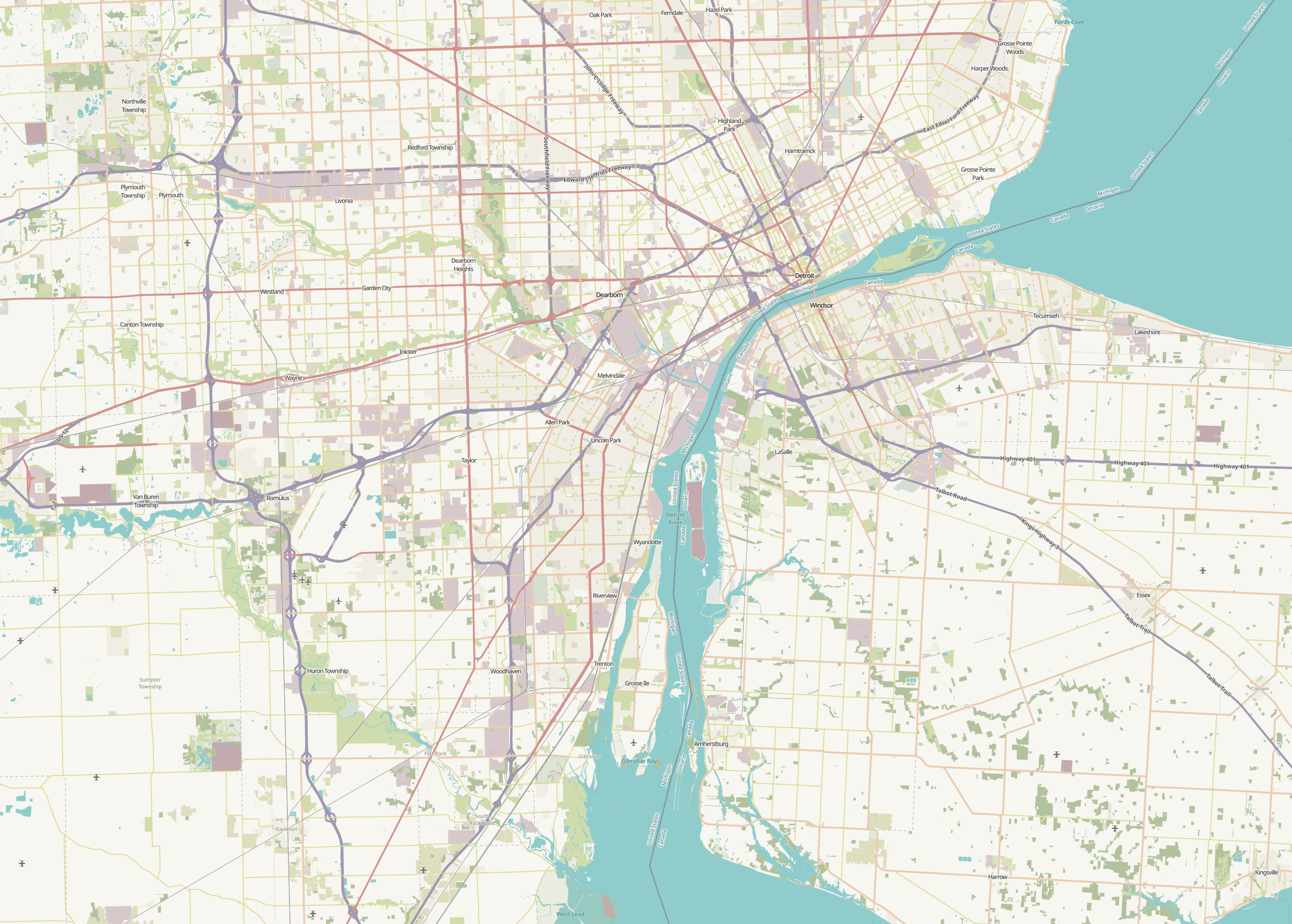
- Location within Wayne County, Michigan Location within Michigan Location within the United States

Geography
- Location: Michigan
- Coordinates: 42°14′20″N 83°08′27″W
- Highest elevation: 584 ft (178 m)

Administration
- United States
- State: Michigan
- County: Wayne

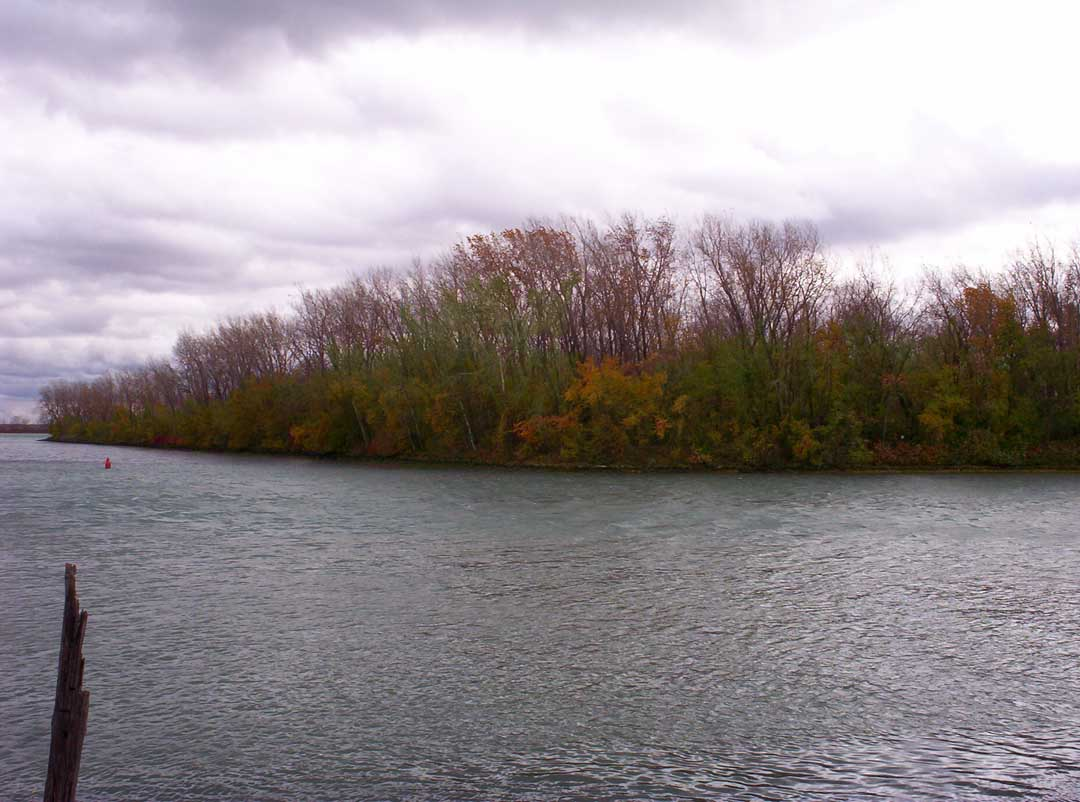
View of Mud Island from John D. Dingell Park in Ecorse

Mud Island is an island in the Detroit River International Wildlife Refuge, in southeast Michigan. It is in Wayne County. Its coordinates are 42°14′20″N 83°08′27″W; the United States Geological Survey gave its elevation as 584 ft (178 m) in 1980. Once owned by National Steel, white bass and perch are now caught there.
