= North Maumee Bay Archeological District =

Archaeological site in Michigan, United States

- U.S. National Register of Historic Places
- U.S. Historic district
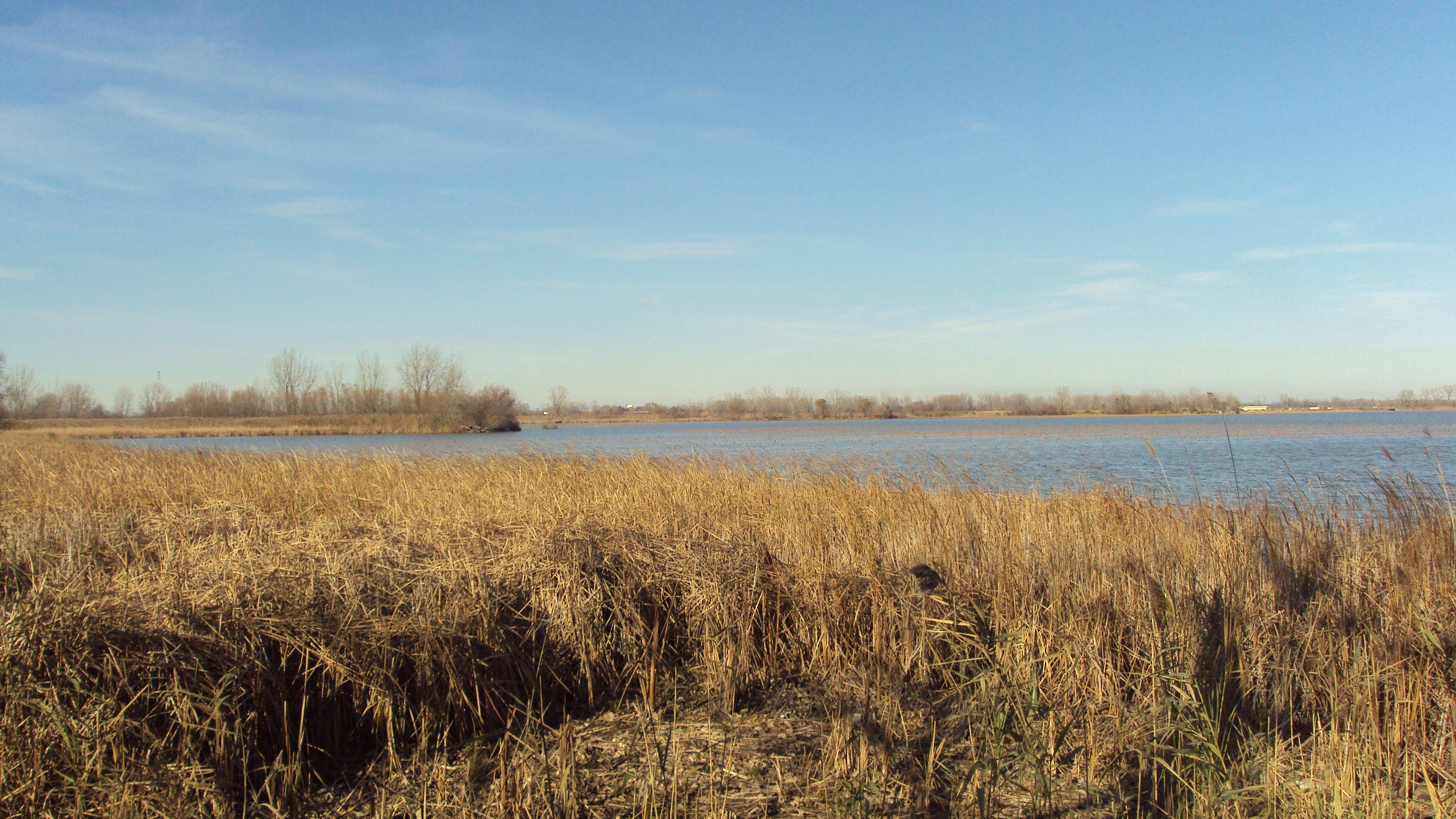
- North Maumee Bay along East Sterns Road

- Location within Michigan Location within the United States
- Location: Erie Township; Monroe County, Michigan
- Coordinates: 41°45′N 83°27′W
- NRHP reference No.: 80001882
- Added to NRHP: December 5, 1980

The North Maumee Bay Archeological District is a historic district containing archeological sites located in the southeasternmost corner of Erie Township in Monroe County, Michigan. It was added to the National Register of Historic Places on December 5, 1980.

While the official address of the archeological site is restricted, the district incorporates the area of the North Maumee Bay at the mouth of the Ottawa River and Maumee River in Lake Erie. The sparsely populated area includes the Woodtick Peninsula, Gard Island, Indian Island, the Erie Marsh Preserve, the Erie Fish and Hunt Club, and much of the grassy shoreline and interior wetlands.

Public access is permitted, and the area is a well known fishing destination. It is also known for one of the areas under dispute during the Toledo War between Michigan and Ohio from 1835–1836, although no actual conflict took place on the land.

== History ==
The district spans 130 acres and contains 20 sites. The sites were associated with Native American tribes of the Late Woodland period. Of these, multiple sites are located on Gard Island and Indian Island. Additional sites have been recorded on Woodtick Peninsula, but were destroyed before any research was completed. The existing sites were originally in a riverine environment, but were located on the shoreline at the time of excavation. The Gard Island and Indian Island sites were substantially reduced in size due to encroachment from Lake Erie.

== Later history ==
In 2006, the Erie Marsh Preserve was incorporated into the expanding Detroit River International Wildlife Refuge. At 3.46 mi² (8.97 km²), the Erie Marsh Preserve doubled the size of the growing refuge and remains the refuge's largest property. At 19 acres (7.7 ha), Gard Island was also incorporated into the wildlife refuge at the same time. These two areas represent the southernmost portions of the wildlife refuge. Properties within the district are owned by private land owners, The Nature Conservancy, and the U.S. Fish and Wildlife Service.
