= SS Valley Camp =

Lake freighter built in 1917

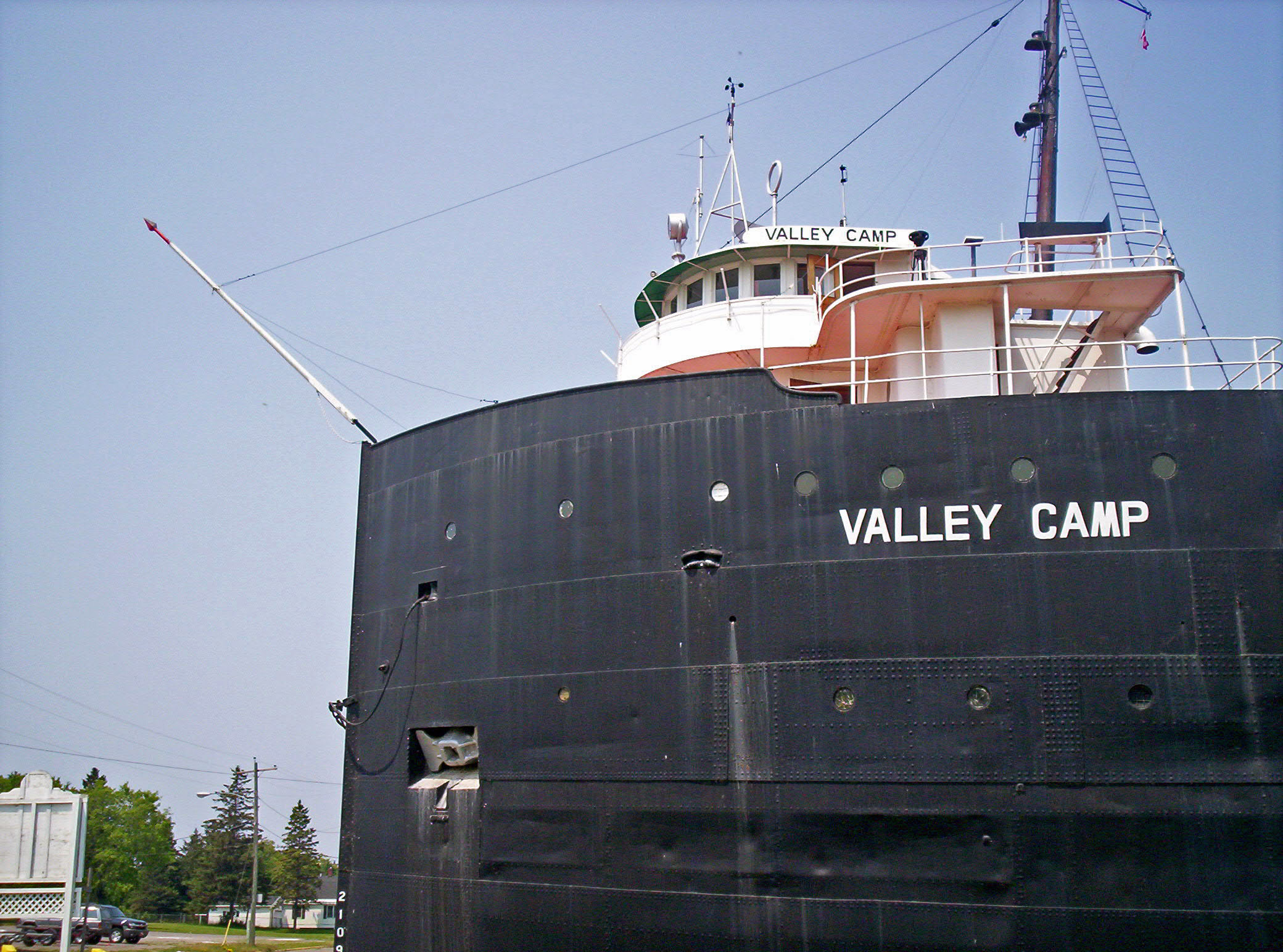

History

United States
- Name: Louis W. Hill (1917–c.1955); Valley Camp (c.1955–)
- Owner: National Steel Corporation (1917–c.1955); Wilson Marine Transit Company (c.1955–1959); Republic Steel Corporation (1959–1968); Le Sault de Sainte Marie Historical Sites, Inc. (1968–)
- Builder: American Shipbuilding Co.
- Launched: 1917
- In service: 1917-1966
- Status: Museum ship

General characteristics
- Tonnage: 12,000 GRT
- Length: 550 ft (170 m)
- Beam: 58 ft (18 m)
- Depth of hold: 31 ft (9.4 m)
- Installed power: 1,800 hp (1,300 kW) triple expansion steam engine
- SS Valley Camp
- U.S. National Register of Historic Places
- Michigan State Historic Site
- Location within Michigan
- Location: Sault Ste. Marie, Michigan
- Coordinates: 46°29′57″N 84°20′11″W
- Built: 1917
- Architect: American Shipbuilding Co.
- NRHP reference No.: 72000606

Significant dates
- Added to NRHP: 1 February 1972
- Designated MSHS: 1 October 1971

SS Valley Camp is a lake freighter that served on the Great Lakes for almost 50 years and is now a museum ship in Sault Ste. Marie, Michigan.

== History ==
Valley Camp was launched in Lorain, Ohio, in 1917 as the Louis W. Hill for the National Steel Corporation. She sailed for this company for 38 years hauling iron ore and coal until 1955 when she was sold to the Wilson Marine Transit Company. It was in this fleet that she received her current name. For this company she carried a wider array of bulk goods including grains and stone. Valley Camp was a member of the Wilson Fleet only until 1959 when the Republic Steel Corporation bought her and several of her Wilson fleetmates, including her identical sister ship Silver Bay (formerly Albert Heiken of National Steel). Republic kept Valley Camp's name, and for that company she hauled iron ore and coal to their mills in Buffalo, New York; Cleveland, Ohio; and Indiana Harbor, Indiana. In 1966, Valley Camp made her last voyage. She was decommissioned due to problems with her coal-burning boilers. Her twin, Silver Bay, went on to sail until the early 1980s.

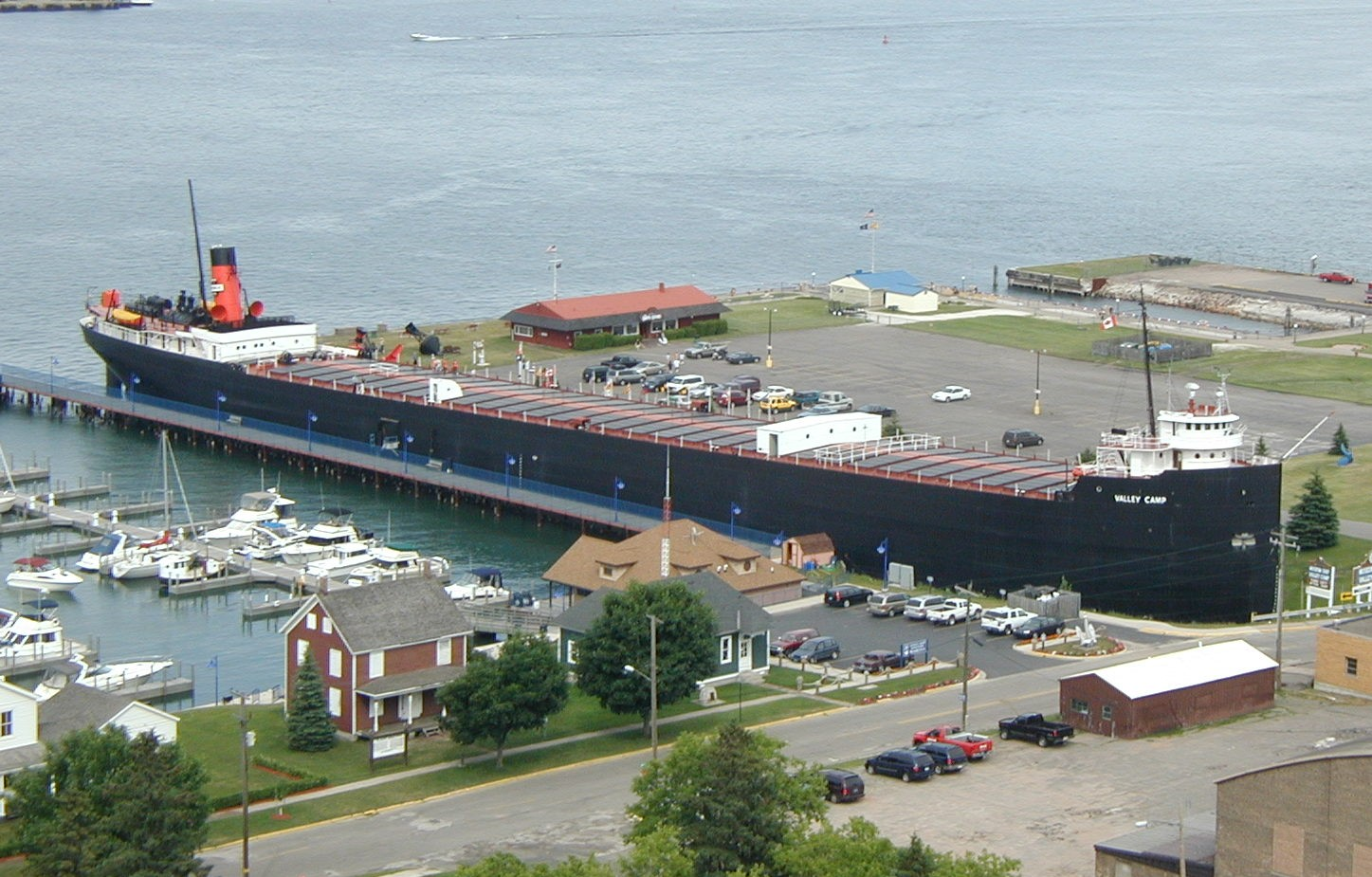
Aerial view of the ship as museum

Purchased by Le Sault de Sainte Marie Historical Sites, Inc., for $10,000, the ship was towed from Wisconsin to Sault Ste. Marie on July 6, 1968, during Sault Ste. Marie's tri-centennial celebration. As a museum ship, Valley Camp is listed on the National Register of Historic Places. Visitors are able to explore the ship as well as view exhibits in the cargo hold, which houses hundreds of artifacts, paintings, shipwreck items, models, two lifeboats from the wreck of the SS Edmund Fitzgerald, and exhibits of objects related to maritime history.

== The ship ==
Valley Camp stretches 550 feet (170 m) overall with a 525-foot (160 m) keel. She has a beam of 58 feet (18 m) and a depth of 31 feet (9.4 m). Her gross tonnage capacity is 12,000 gross tons. The ship was powered by a 1,800 horsepower (1,300 kW) triple expansion reciprocating steam engine which she retains to this day. Never the flagship of the fleet, her quarters were spartan yet comfortable. The crews quarters are lined by wood trim and equipped with simple bunks. The wheelhouse is lined with wood and trimmed by brass. Her original steering wheel is in place. In the stern, her original smokestack, including her double-chime whistle, are still in place. Almost unmodified from her original configuration, she is the most intact example of the classic Great Lakes ore carriers that once numbered in the hundreds and few of which survive to this day.

== Gallery ==
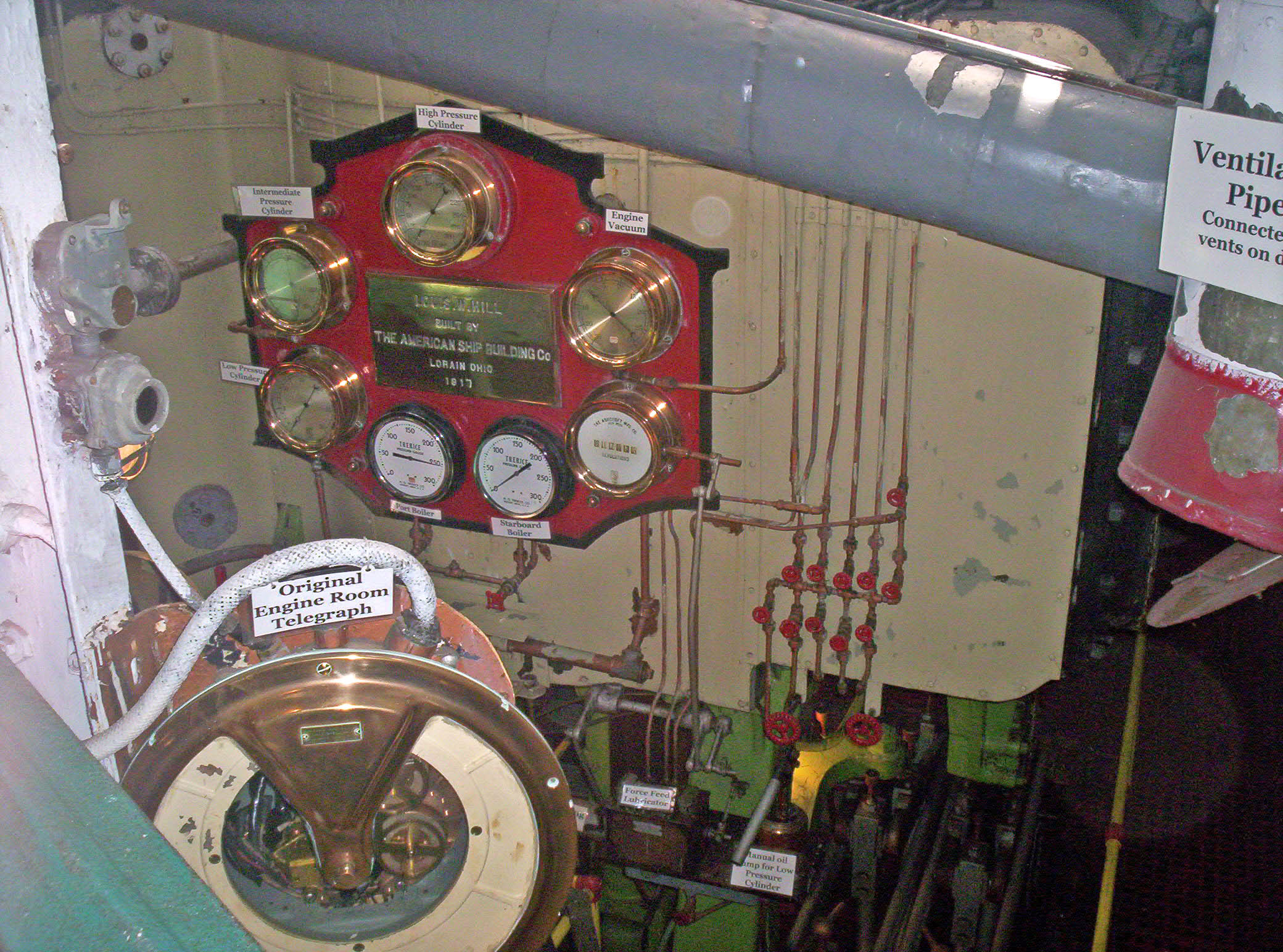
Her steam engine

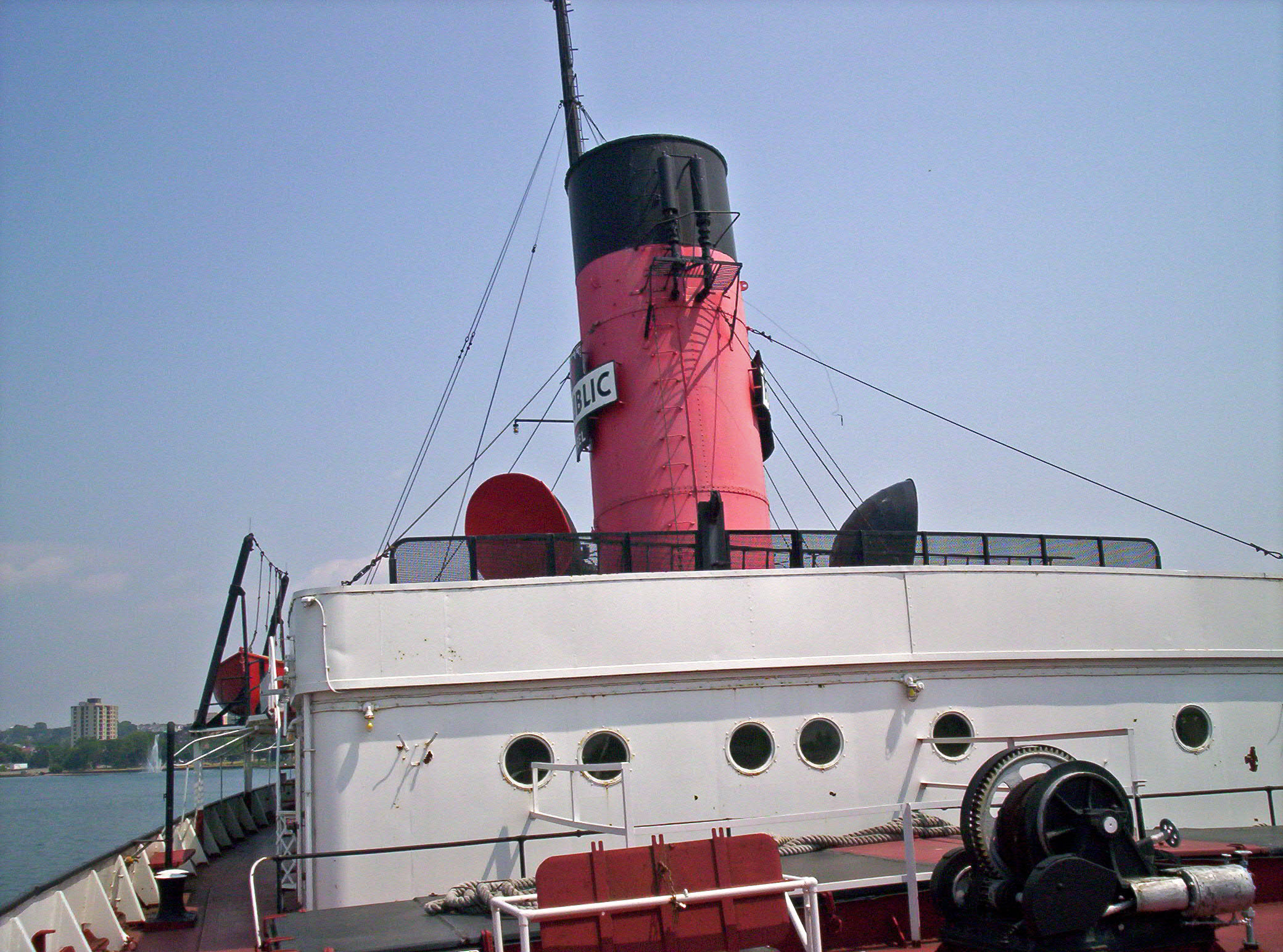
Looking aft to the stack
