= National Steel Corporation =

American steel corporation

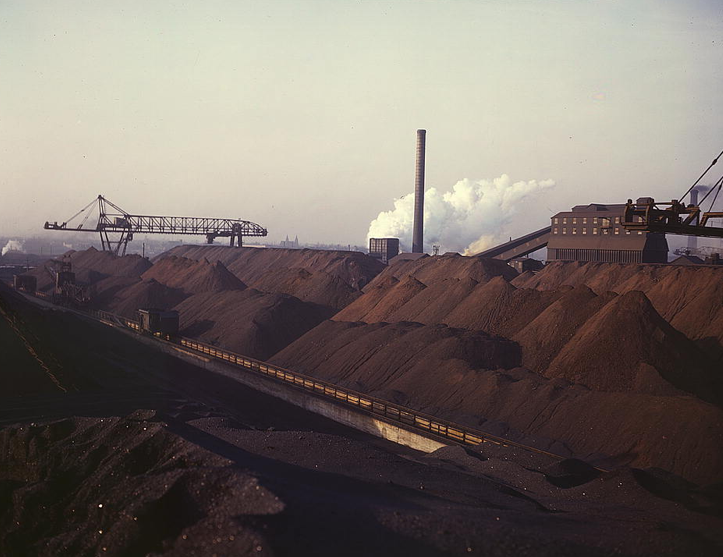
National Steel Corporation furnaces and stockpiles, Detroit, Michigan, 1942. Photograph by Arthur Siegel.

The National Steel Corporation (1929–2003) was a major American steel producer. It was founded on October 1, 1929 through a merger arranged by Weirton Steel with the new Great Lakes Steel Corporation, which was then in the process of construction of its Ecorse steel works, certain subsidiaries of M. A. Hanna Company, namely the four blast furnaces in Buffalo and two on Zug Island, the company's iron mining division and its fleet of ore carriers; and the Michigan Steel Corp, predecessor to Great Lakes Steel, which joined the group in 1931 before the adjoining plant of the Great Lakes Steel Corp was formally commissioned.

National Steel was headquartered in Pittsburgh. Despite a difficult market in Depression-setting 1930, the company reported USD 8.4 million in profits. Again, in 1931 the company was profitable unlike many other competitors. The company could attribute its success primarily to sales to the automobile industry. Large steel producing operations were located near Detroit, providing the company with low shipping costs. Throughout the Great Depression, National Steel obtained profitability every year.

The company was part of the Dow Jones Industrial Average from 1935 until 1959.

== National Steel Company (1899) ==
The National Steel Company of 1899 (a U.S. Steel predecessor) had no relationship with the National Steel Corporation of 1929 other than the name.

Incorporated in New Jersey on February 27, 1899, had a capital stock of $27 million par $100 7% preferred ($26 million outstanding) and $32 million par $100 common (all outstanding). The remaining $1,000,000 of preferred stock were issued on April 28, 1899 to the Oliver & Snyder Steel Co. in exchange for the entire $100,000 stock of the Rosena Furnace Co. and associated properties. (Note: ownership of the blast furnace; The 803 acre Unity Coking Coal Tract in Westmoreland County, Pennsylvania.; A 10-year contract to receive the output of the 700 coke ovens of the Uniontown Coke Works of the Oliver company; a 1/6 interest in iron ore produced from the Lake Superior mines of the Oliver Iron Mining Co.; National Steel assumed $250,000 5% bonds due Dec 1, 1912 of the Rosena Furnace Company.)

All of the companies acquired produced basic Bessemer steel with the exception of the Buhl Steel Co. who produced basic open hearth steel, but also had to buy ingots on the market to cover their own needs.

Companies acquired by NSCo
Name	Hometown	Debt	Debt Due	Steel tpd (Note: Rough estimate of semifinished steel product capacity per day: tin plate bars, sheet bars, billets. Total: 5,400-5,800 tons per day (1,620,000 per year))	BF	Iron tpd
Ohio Steel Co	Youngstown, Oh	$1,000,000	June 1, 1908	1,500	2	1,333
Shenango Valley Steel Co	New Castle, Pa	$330,000	October 1, 1902	1,200-1,400	2	633
Organized in ca. July 1891 with $200,000 capital to build a 400tpd Bessemer plant, which was producing at capacity (500tpd) in January 1893. Bought the adjoining Neshannock blast furnace of the Crawford Iron & Steel Co. (Note: Crawford Iron & Steel was dissolved in March 1894.) on April 8, 1893, for $250,000 and on that occasion increased its capital stock by $200,000 to $450,000. The 78x17ft furnace had 4 Whitwell stoves and a 165ft draft stack and a capacity of 67,000tpa (184tpd) of pig iron. The original furnace was first blown in on December 1, 1872. Crawford Iron & Steel had bought it from the Kimberly Iron Co in 1883. It had once produced 109,790 tons of pig iron in 90 weeks (174tpd). 40.992°N 80.352°W (Note: 1888; 1894; 1899) The company bought the furnace of the Raney & Berger Iron Co, also in April 1893 and also for $250,000 and on the occasion increased its capital stock to upward of $1,000,000. The furnace was switched from producing mostly foundry iron to Bessemer iron. In December 1899 National Steel decided to dismantle the furnace and replace it with a larger one. 40.992°N 80.352°W (Note: 1894; 1899) In January 1898 the capital of the Shenango Valley Steel Co. was increased from 10,000 to 15,000 shares of $100 par.
Rosena Furnace Company	New Castle, Pa	$250,000	December 1, 1912		1	367
The Rosena Furnace Company was incorporated on December 1, 1892, headquartered in Pittsburgh, with a capital stock of $100,000, to carry out operations of the furnace owned by the Oliver Iron & Steel Co. of Pittsburgh. A sum of $100,000 was expected to be spent on improvements, namely new stoves and blowing engines. The furnace originally had a capacity of 60tpd and in the first 43 months of operation produced 75,000 tons. The original furnace was built in 1872 (blown in June 1873), rebuilt in 1893, torn down and rebuilt in 1897 to a height of 100 feet and a capacity of 150,000tpa. 40.99628°N 80.34534°W (Note: 1888; 1894; 1899)
Ætna Standard Iron & Steel Co	Bridgeport, Oh	$600,000	January 1, 1908	1,000-1,100	3	433
The sheet and bar mill of the Aetna Iron & Steel Co at Bridgeport was built in 1873. The Standard Iron Company built a sheet and bar mill in 1883. Both companies merged in 1893 with a capital of $2,300,000. 40.0841°N 80.73486°W (Note: 1886; 1893 (index); 1897 (index)) Two 60 feet high furnaces were built at Mingo Junction: the Sidney furnace in 1871 and the Estella furnace in 1872 (blown in May 1873). The combined capacity was 62,000tpa. Both furnaces were rebuilt in 1886 to a height of 75 feet and a capacity of 80,000tpa (each). The cut-nail works of the Junction Iron Co. were built in 1882. The slab and billet mill of the Laughlin & Junction Iron Co were built in 1886. The two companies merged in 1894. 40.315067°N 80.60554°W (Note: 1892; 1900) On July 1, 1897 the Junction Iron Co of Mingo Junction was absorbed by Aetna: capital was increased to $3,000,000 and the entire stock of Junction Iron ($700,000) exchanged for a like amount of Aetna stock. Three directors resigned from the board to give their seats to representatives of the Junction Iron Company. The new combine had 2 blast furnaces, a Bessemer steel plant and a sheet and tin plate bar mill at Mingo. At Bridgeport it had a sheet, a bar, a structural mill and a tin plate works.
Bellaire Steel Co	Bellaire, Oh	$301,000	March 2, 1906	800-900	2	600
The Bellaire Nail Works were renamed to Bellaire Steel Co in February 1896. The first blast furnace was blown in on September 22, 1873 and rebuilt in 1886. The second was blown in on March 7, 1895. In 1898 they were both 75 feet high with a combined capacity of 180,000tpa. 40.02219°N 80.73934°W (Note: 1884; 1890 (index); 1895 (index); 1900 (index); 1908 (index); 1915 (index); 1924 (index))
King, Gilbert & Warner Co	Columbus, Oh	$130,000	May 1, 1905	500	2	466
Buhl Steel Co	Sharon, Pa	$200,000	November 1, 1903	400	2	167
Union Iron & Steel Co	Youngstown, Oh	none				

National Steel Common Stock Price Range (Note: 1899 1900 1901)
	Year		Jan	Feb	Mar	Apr	May	Jun	Jul	Aug	Sep	Oct	Nov	Dec
1899	63	High			54 3/4	63	62	55 7/8	54 1/2	57 1/2	56 7/8	52 3/4	50 1/2	49
1899	31 3/4	Low			50	44	45	43 3/4	49	53 1/2	49 1/2	47 1/4	46 1/2	31 3/4
1900	53 1/2	High	46 1/2	53 1/2	47 1/4	46 1/2	34	30 1/2	27	28	27 3/4	31	39 3/4	43
1900	20	Low	40	45 1/2	41	33	27 1/4	20	23	23 1/2	23 1/2	24	28 5/8	33
1901	60 1/2	High	44 3/8	50	57	60 1/2								
1901	37	Low	37	40 1/8	43 1/2	57								

National Steel Preferred Price Range
	Year		Jan	Feb	Mar	Apr	May	Jun	Jul	Aug	Sep	Oct	Nov	Dec
1899	99 3/8	High			95	95	92 1/8	93	94	99 3/8	98 7/8	96	95 3/8	95
1899	85	Low			93	89	85	88	89 3/4	94	95	93 3/4	93 1/4	86 1/2
1900	97	High	94	97	97	95 5/8	89 5/8	87 1/2	85 1/4	86	86	88 1/2	93 1/2	96 3/4
1900	79 3/4	Low	92	94	93 3/4	88 3/4	85	79 3/4	83 1/8	83 3/8	82 3/4	82	87 1/2	91 1/2
1901	120	High	93 1/2	102 1/2	118 1/2	120								
1901	90	Low	90	91 1/2	99 1/2	117								

The United States Steel Corporation was incorporated on February 25, 1901. It offered a premium of $125 of its new 7% preferred stock for each $100 par value of National Steel preferred stock and a similar $125 premium for each $100 par of National common stock.

Companies acquired by U.S. Steel
Company	Preferred			Common			
Company	Old	New (USS pref)	Premium	Old	New (USS com)	Premium	+USS pref (Note: face amount of new U.S. Steel preferred stock exchanged for each $100 face amount of common stock of the old company, in addition to the USS common stock received)
Federal Steel Co	$53,260,900	$60,446,362	$110	$46,484,300	$49,970,627	$107 1/2	$4
American Steel & Wire Co	40,000,000	47,600,000	117 1/2	50,000,000	51,250,000	102 1/2	
National Tube Co	40,000,000	53,520,000	125	40,000,000	50,000,000	125	8 4/5
National Steel Co	27,000,000	33,750,000	125	32,000,000	40,000,000	125	
American Tin Plate Co	18,325,000	26,506,250	125	28,000,000	35,000,000	125	20
American Steel Hoop Co	14,000,000		100	19,000,000		100	
American Sheet Steel Co	24,500,000		100	24,500,000		100	
American Bridge Co	30,527,800	33,580,580	110	30,527,800	32,054,190	105	
Lake Superior Consolidated Iron Mines		38,774,700		28,722,000	38,744,700	135	135
Totals	$247,613,700	$334,077,892		$299,234,100	$340,548,817		

== Detroit Iron & Steel Company ==
The Detroit Iron & Steel Company was a predecessor to Great Lakes Steel Corporation and in 1902 built a greenfield blast furnace plant on Zug Island, the first modern blast furnace plant in the state of Michigan.

The company was incorporated in Michigan on April 24, 1902, and issued 75,000 par $10 7% preferred and 75,000 par $10 common shares (split 2-for-1 on July 16, 1917). Issued $400,000 5% 10-year bonds dated May 2, 1904, due $40,000 annually from 1907 to 1916. Retired those bonds only three years later and broke even on cumulative preferred dividends in 1907. Issued $600,000 15-year 5% bonds dated July 1, 1909 (at construction of second blast furnace), due annually $40,000 till July 1, 1925. (Note: $280,000 redeemed as scheduled by 1917-07-01; the final $40,000 called 6 months before maturity on January 1, 1925) Paid 4% per year dividend on common stock until 1917, then 2.5% quarterly (10% annual - 20% when considering the stock split!) and also paid a few extra dividends.

- President: Daniel Rhodes Hanna, since 1918 Howard Melville Hanna Jr.

The joint venture included:

- M. A. Hanna & Co
- Solvay Process Company (owned 30 adjoining byproduct coke ovens)
- Detroit capitalists

The furnace had a capacity of 300 tons of foundry iron per day, 30 additional coke ovens were built concurrently and there were plans to eventually have 180 ovens. This was the first modern coke-filled blast furnace built in the state of Michigan. Riter-Conley had the contract for the furnace, Russell Wheel & Foundry (Detroit) for auxiliary structures. The furnace was 78x17.5ft and the 4 stoves were 83x20ft. There were 120 coke ovens in 1905. The furnace was blown in on February 15, 1904 and in 1911 rebuild as a modern thin-lined, water cooled furnace. The B furnace (80x18.5ft; 300tpd, Arthur G. McKee type), directly adjoining to the east of A, was begun in early 1909 and blown in on July 21, 1910. The plant was located on the north east corner of the island. (Note: 42.28741°N 83.10559°W 1910 map 1905 map)

In 1917 the #Detroit Furnace Company was acquired.

On May 1, 1920, the company was kicked off the Detroit Stock Exchange for failure to disclose operational and financial information.

On November 1, 1920, Detroit Iron & Steel was among several companies that merged to form the Hanna Furnace Co. (Delaware). Its two blast furnaces had a capacity of 685 tons per day.

The furnaces were relined: No. 1 in 1905, 1909, ...

=== Pig Iron Industry in Michigan ===
Pig Iron Shipped from blast furnaces (1918)
Pennsylvania	14,701,252
Ohio	8,711,205
Illinois	3,409,876
Alabama	2,645,179
Indiana	2,583,375
New York	2,482,450
Michigan	502,884
United States	38,230,440

There were only 3 coke-burning blast furnaces in total in the state of Michigan (December 1914). The Wayne furnace (42.34216°N 83.00656°W) of the Detroit Furnace Company was a small 62 feet high 75tpd hand filled coke furnace with pipe stoves more resembling a typical charcoal furnace. It had existed in one form or another since originally built in 1870. The Detroit Furnaces Co. when incorporated on April 1, 1906, with $150,000 in capital took it over as a charcoal furnace. The company was acquired by Detroit Iron & Steel in 1917. The furnace went out of blast for the last time in the fall of 1919 and was dismantled to make room for a power plant of the Detroit City Gas Company.

Michigan as the second largest producer of iron ore in the United States had however about a dozen charcoal furnaces in operation and ranked about 7th in pig iron production (1916). Michigan pig iron production statistics 1872-1911:

Charcoal Furnaces in Michigan (ca. 1916)
Company	Town	On	Off	bold=exact	
Mitchell-Diggins Iron Co	Cadillac	March 6, 1906		44.26376°N 85.41006°W	
East Jordan Furnace Co	East Jordan	Jan 17, 1910		45.16864°N 85.13513°W	
Cleveland-Cliffs Iron Co	Gladstone	April 16, 1896		45.87297°N 87.00822°W	
Antrim Iron Co	Antrim	Feb 1888	1943	44.88933°N 85.07332°W	
Pioneer Iron Co	Marquette			46.56509°N 87.39509°W	2 furnaces
Stephenson Charcoal Iron Co (Note: The 80tpd furnace was blown in on July 29, 1912. Detailed description in:)	Wells	July 29, 1912	1942	45.78194°N 87.07563°W	
Charcoal Iron Company of America (Note: Incorporated in Michigan on May 13, 1915, by members of the reorganization committee of the Lake Superior Iron & Chemical Co., (Note: Incorporated June 28, 1910, in New York with a capital of: $1,625,000 7% preferred (all issued); $10,000,000 common ($8,375,000 issued, rest reserved for conversion of preferred); $10,000,000 25-year 6% bonds ($6,500,000 issued July 1, 1910, £616,420 or $3m worth of those were listed on the London Stock Exchange); Took over the Michigan company of the same name (headed by Joseph H. Berry of Berry Bros. varnish fame until his death on May 22, 1907 at age 68, only a few weeks after the formation of the Lake Superior Iron & Chemical Co of Michigan.). The Michigan company owned: 4 charcoal furnaces totaling 500tpd, with byproduct wood carbonizing plants; Ashland Iron & Steel Co; Newberry Iron Furnace Co; Manistique Iron Co; Elk Rapids Iron Co; 2 furnaces without own carbonizing plants; Boyne City Iron Company; Chocolay furnace near Marquette; iron mines; extensive timber lands; The capital consisted of $5,350,000 of common stock and $6,000,000 of bonds authorized, of which only $2,675,000 were ever issued and before April 1908 converted into $2,675,000 of 7% preferred stock.) which had been in receivership since October 30, 1913, and was foreclosed and auctioned off at Marquette ca. July 1, 1915. Frank W. Blair (Detroit), president of the Union Trust Company, former chairman of the board of Lake Superior Iron, and receiver of it, became chairman of the board and president of the new company. Issued 521,725 par $10 6% preferred and 283,935 shares par $10 common stock. Was listed on the Detroit Stock Exchange in April 1916. Also owned one furnace in Ashland, Wisconsin (46.58135°N 90.90380°W) and one iron mine in the Gogebic Range at Bessemer, Michigan (46.47012°N 90.06474°W).)	Chocolay	1860		46°28′35″N 87°18′44″W	
Charcoal Iron Company of America	Boyne City	Jan 1, 1905		45.22280°N 85.01699°W	
Charcoal Iron Company of America	Elk Rapids	July 1873		44.89967°N 85.41578°W	
Charcoal Iron Company of America	Manistique	Mar 4, 1891		45.96799°N 86.24504°W	
Charcoal Iron Company of America	Newberry	May 1883		46.35719°N 85.50649°W	
New Metals Process Co	Marquette			46.56888°N 87.40313°W	
	green = Upper Peninsula				

Ore received by ship on Lake Michigan (tons)
Port	1910	1914
South Chicago	5,080,679	3,606,587
Gary	1,775,880	1,631,564
Indiana Harbor	287,172	661,054
Milwaukee	121,446	93,121
Elk Rapids	60,857	28,437
Boyne City	50,355	50,098
East Jordan	37,910	38,158
Fruitport	37,785	0
Total	7,452,084	6,109,019

== Hanna Furnace Company ==
Only three of the companies (names in bold) were relevant to the National Steel Corporation, the others were effectively dissolved before, their plants apparently having become technologically obsolete and no longer economically viable or no longer worthy of needed investment. Although in the case of the Buffalo Union Furnace Co. the company survived, but not its original plant.

Companies consolidated by Hanna Furnace Co.
Company	Location	BF	Iron Tpd
**Detroit Iron & Steel Co.**	Zug Island	2	685
United Iron & Steel Co.	West Middlesex, Pa.	2	735
United Iron & Steel Co.	Leetonia, Oh.	2	735
The Fannie furnace was one of 3 stacks of the Wheeler Furnace Co. of Sharon, Pennsylvania, whose adjacent furnace in West Middlesex was named Ella. Fanny was blown in on Oct 13, 1873 and rebuilt in 1885. The 150tpd furnace, idle since 1896 was taken over by the recently organized Reed Furnace Co. (Note: Owned by Lloyd G. Reed of Erie, probably son of Charles Manning Reed.) in 1899. The Cherry Valley Iron Co. (Pittsburgh) obtained ownership of the plant on Apr 5, 1901. [...] The furnace was dismantled in 1929. **41.17261°N 80.45663°W** Leetonia, on the crossing of the Pittsburgh, Fort Wayne and Chicago Railway and the Niles and New Lisbon Railroad (branch of Cleveland & Mahoning Valley RR), was situated near deposits of high quality coking coal. William Lee was co-founder of the Leetonia Iron and Coal Company (Note: Incorporated in Ohio on Jan 29, 1866.) and the namesake of the town. The first furnace was built in 1867 and torn down in 1890. The second furnace was built in 1968 and rebuild in 1883 to a capacity of 50,000tpa. The Cherry Valley Iron Company (Note: incorporated in Ohio Nov 6, 1873.) was the successor to Leetonia Iron & Coal and took over their 2 blast furnaces and the adjacent rolling mill in 1873 and production restarted after a period of idleness. The No. 1 furnace ranked #15 among 30 active Ohio blast furnaces in 1874, producing 4,498 of the total 192,016 tons (2.34%). Cherry Valley had assumed a debt of $800,000 in 1873 and in 1879 defaulted on this debt. Business was continued relatively seamlessly by a new company, the Cherry Valley Iron Works. (Note: Incorporated in Ohio on Aug 16, 1879.) In 1899 the rolling mill was taken over by Republic Iron & Steel Co. In 1900 the Cherry Valley Iron Company of Pittsburgh (Note: organized by: Joshua W. Rhodes and L. W. Young (Pittsburgh) of J.W. Rhodes & Co; Edwin N. Ohl (New Castle) of Republic Iron & Steel; Robert W. Flenniken of the Pennsylvania Car Wheel Co) took over the 200-ton furnace. In 1904 the furnace was torn down and rebuilt (by Riter-Conley), the number of beehive coke ovens doubled to 200. [...] The furnace was rebuilt in 1924 and produced about 13,000 tons per month. The Davison Coke & Iron Co. took it over as a long-term lease in April 1929. It was dismantled in 1936. **40.88091°N 80.75467°W** The United Iron & Steel Co., incorporated on Nov 27, 1906, took over the business of the Cherry Valley Iron Company on Feb 8, 1907. The 2 furnaces had a combined capacity of 650 tons per day, additional property included 200 beehive coke ovens in Leetonia, iron ore properties in the Mesabi range and coal lands in the Connellsville Coalfield. In July 1909 M. A. Hanna & Co entered into an agreement with the company by which they would operate the two plants and sell their outputs.
Penn Iron & Coal Co.	Dover, Oh.	1	450
The Tuscarawas Coal and Iron Co. (Note: Incorporated in Ohio on Mar 16, 1865.) tore down their Fairfield furnace and replaced it with the 14,000tpa Dover furnace in 1878-79.... The first installation of (24) Roberts-type byproduct coke ovens was built at the plant. The type was invented by Arthur Roberts and M. W. Ditto of Chicago.... The furnace, acquired on Oct 18, 1929 by the Valley Furnace Co. and abandoned as of Dec 31, 1929, was considered permanently abandoned in 1931. **40.51959°N 81.47942°W**
Buffalo Union Furnace Co.	Buffalo, NY.	3	>1,000
A 4-year lease had been obtained by M. A. Hanna & Co on July 1, 1920, together with a 20-year purchase option. M. A. Hanna & Co. already were the sales agent for BUFCo. and held substantial stock interest when the lease was taken. This lease was continued when the Hanna Furnace Co. was incorporated, albeit it had become a 40-year lease with a 20-year purchase option. (Note: According to it was a 40-year lease since the beginning) The lease was given up Nov 20, 1927 and the "Hamburgh Street Plant" reverted to BUFCo. At the same time, Hanna Furnace Co. bought BUFCo. and consolidated it with the Rogers-Brown Iron Co. plant, continuing both businesses under Buffalo Union Furnace Co. control. BUFCo. was renamed Hanna Furnace Corporation on Apr 22, 1930. The three furnaces ("A", "B" and "C") were first blown in on Feb 25, 1893, Aug 12, 1899 and Jun 18, 1901. By 1919 the company considered them becoming obsolete in competition with recently built 600-1,000 ton furnaces. (Note: See Trumbull-Cliffs Furnace Company for an example) Operation of the "C" furnace was discontinued in April 1925, and that of the "A" furnace in January 1928. The "B" furnace was still in operation on Jan 15, 1930, but was slated to be in its final campaign. The Buffalo Union Furnace Company was incorporated on Nov 2, 1900 as the consolidation of the Buffalo Furnace Co., (Note: Incorporated ca. July 1892 to rebuild the plant of the former Union Iron Company, (Note: The first blast furnace in the Niagara district was built in 1861 by this company. No. 2 was built in 1862 and No. 3 in 1865. In 1874 the plant's 3 blast furnaces had a capacity for 100tpd of pig iron, the rolling mills made plates and structural shapes and employment was 1000-1200.) which had been idle for 12 years. The new blast furnace by Riter-Conley was to be cutting-edge, turning out 250-300tpd.) the Union Iron Works and the Buffalo Charcoal Iron Co. (Note: Incorporated in New York State on Sep 14, 1899) (each owning one furnace) with Daniel Rhodes Hanna president, succeeded in 1909 by Frank Burkett Baird, who was the original organizer of the three companies. **42.86333°N 78.85826°W**
**Donner-Hanna Coke Corp**	Buffalo		
Incorporated May 15, 1917 in New York as the Donner Union Coke Corp, name changed Apr 16, 1924. Originally financed and owned by the United States government, which had a particular interest in the byproduct Toluol needed for explosives production amidst World War 1; built and intended to be operated pursuant to a public-private joint venture agreement of May 29, 1918. Construction was suspended after the armistice and was resumed in April 1919. Hanna Furnace Co. owned 50% of the stock (3,501 of 7,002 no-par shares). Batteries 1-3 consisted of 150 Koppers ovens of 11.5 tons capacity each and run on a 14.3-hour coking time schedule (252 ovens pushed per day; ca. 1,000,000 tons per year). The plant began operations late in 1920, serving 3 furnaces of Buffalo Union Furnace Co. and 2 furnaces of the Donner Steel Company. The No. 4 battery was built in 1930. One battery of 15 ovens rated at 114,000tpa was completed in 1943. 36 new ovens were built in 1951. **42.85218°N 78.8409°W**
Hollister Mining Co
...and companies later acquired
**Rogers-Brown Iron Company**	Buffalo	4	1,400
The Rogers-Brown Iron Co. on May 1, 1927 defaulted on their $4,000,000 20-year 7% (NYSE-listed) bonds due May 1, 1942. The Hanna Furnace Co. bought the bonds for 40 cents on the dollar and so obtained the property in 1927. (Note: Hanna bought $3,604,800 (90%) of the distressed bonds deposited prior to Oct 1, 1927 for 40 cents on the dollar, won the assets for $1,500,000 as the only bidder at the Sep 27, 1927 auction, yet offered to buy the rest of the bonds at the same 40% discount. In other words, the company paid $1,600,000 for the bonds and paid $1,500,000 to itself.) 1903 RR map The Buffalo & Susquehanna Iron Company was incorporated in New York on May 17, 1902 and on its 50-acre tract in Buffalo built two blast furnaces, blown in on Sep 27, 1904 and July 5, 1905 and having a capacity for 600-700tpd of foundry pig iron. The Stock was equally divided between William Arthur Rogers{{efn| Also organized and was president of the Tonawanda Iron & Steel Co. portrait: Was president of the Punxsutawney Iron Company (one blast furnace at 40.94114°N 78.9824°W) until 1912.} of Rogers, Brown & Co (Note: Rogers, Brown & Co was a leading pig iron sales and distribution company operating since the 1880s. A merger became effective July 2, 1925 with Crocker Brothers and business was continued as Rogers, Brown & Crocker Brothers, Inc. The new firm included the business of Naylor & Co and Reed, Fears & Miller Inc which had been absorbed previously. In 1931 Rogers Brown-Lavino Co. was founded.) and Frank H. and Charles W. Goodyear of the Buffalo & Susquehanna Railroad Company, which at the time was adding many miles to their line to establish a connection between certain north-west Pennsylvania coal fields (Note: Reynoldsville coal district, which produced a quality of coal somewhat inferior to Connelsville.: Tyler near Du Bois (Note: Cascade Coal & Coke built a power plant and 200 beehive ovens in 1904-05.); Sykesville (Note: Sister companies Cascade Coal & Coke Co. and Sykesville Coal Co., jointly managed and mining from the same shaft, delivered all their coke to Rogers-Brown. Sykesville Coal built 200 beehive ovens in 1913. Cascade Coal & Coke opened the mine in 1904 and had 200 beehive ovens (in 1911). In an explosion 21 died on July 15, 1911.) 41.04526°N 78.827°W; 2,900 acres of coal lands estimated to contain 20 million tons furnished the entire 300,000 tpa requirement of the plant in 1906. Will have 600 beehive ovens once current construction is finished.) and Buffalo. The capital stock of $1,000,000 was sold at par for cash. The new ship canal was formally opened in April 1905. The Rogers-Brown Iron Co. was incorporated in New York state on Dec 27, 1909. The capital stock of Buffalo & Susquehanna Iron was acquired and a merger was completed in April 1910. The company concurrently acquired adjoining land from the South Buffalo Canal & Dock Co. and on the combined 86-acre property set out to construct two new blast furnaces with a total additional capacity of 700tpd. William A. Rogers was president, Charles W. Goodyear was a director (Frank H. Goodyear had died in 1907). The No. 3 furnace was blown in Feb 5, 1912, the No. 4 furnace on Aug 1, 1912. William Silliman Rogers became president in 1923. The company faced serious and abrupt financial difficulties in 1921. (Note: Rogers-Brown Iron Co. blew in a blast furnace on Sep 8, 1921, the first production of pig iron all year, after stockpiles had been sufficiently depleted. (Recession of 1920–1921)) While a handsome $400,000 (8%) of dividends on common stock were paid in 1920, this was the last common dividend ever paid by the company. The last preferred dividends were paid in the first half of 1921. With the exception of 1923 every year ended with a deficit after depreciation and interest charges. (Note: Income statements: 1915-1918; 1917-1920; 1919-1922; 1921-1924; 1923-1926) Under a rescue plan proposed in October 1925 to reassure holders of the 7% 1922 bonds, Rogers-Brown Iron Co. sold its Susquehanna mine in the Mesabi range to the Susquehanna Ore Co., (Note: Incorporated Dec 19, 1925 in Minnesota. The $1,000,000 of stock was owned by Republic Iron & Steel (50%), Inland Steel (25%) and M. A. Hanna & Co (25%).) who as part of the deal assumed two senior bond issues that were (and continued to be) secured by mortgage on the blast furnace plant and the stocks of the mining subsidiaries: (Note: The mining subsidiaries's stocks were pledged as collateral for the senior and the 1922 bonds and consisted of 100% of the outstanding stock of: Cascade Coal & Coke (incorporated Mar 31, 1904 in Pennsylvania): 3,000 shares par $100; Sykesville Coke Co (Aug 24, 1911 in Pennsylvania): 100 shares par $50; Munro Iron Mining Co (June 25, 1906 in Michigan): 4,000 shares par $25; Cascade and Munro were wholly owned since at least Dec 1907.) $995,000 remaining of the $3,000,000 sold in 1902 and $2,698,000 remaining of the $4,500,000 sold in 1910 and these bonds were not in default when Rogers-Brown Iron Co. went bankrupt in 1927 and were not relevant in the liquidation. The Susquehanna mine was a large and valuable deposit, but also a drain on resources unless operated at high capacity. On the downside it was released from securing the 1922 bonds, which is why bondholders had to approve the rescue plan. The plan became effective Jan 1, 1926. M. A. Hanna & Co. became operator of the Susquehanna mine at Hibbing (Note: 47.44692°N 92.92852°W Ore could be loaded at Duluth or at Two Harbors.) and also of the remaining Rogers-Brown iron mines at Iron River. (Note: Munro Iron Mining Company (wholly owned subsidiary) Rogers mine at 46.09767°N 88.5861°W opened ca. 1911 (a 140ft deep 29ft diameter tubular concrete drop-shaft was sunk during Feb - July 1911). Chicagon mine at 46.09538°N 88.50822°W, first explored in 1881, began shipping in 1911 and produced: Production (whole company)) A major reason for the company's decline contradicting the prosperity of the Roaring Twenties was its high cost of coke. In a last ditch effort it was proposed to capture some byproduct in their beehive coke ovens using a relatively cheap conversion experimentally operating at 4 of their ovens. Buffalo was not a great market for coke oven gas and Rogers-Brown had not made the transition to byproduct coke ovens and had fallen behind the competition. **42.83381°N 78.84916°W** (Note: 1903 map) Typical Number of Employees (ca. 1922): Buffalo plant / 550; Susquehanna iron mine / 73; Munro iron mines / 235; Coal mines / 796; Total / 1,654; Rogers-Brown 7% 1922 bonds Price Range (Note: 1922 1923 1924 1925 1926 1927): / Year / / Jan / Feb / Mar / Apr / May / Jun / Jul / Aug / Sep / Oct / Nov / Dec; 1922 / 100 / High / / / / / **100** / 97 3/4 / 97 7/8 / 96 1/2 / 97 / 96 1/2 / 95 / 93 1/8; 1922 / 93 / Low / / / / / 97 1/2 / 97 / 96 1/8 / 95 / 95 / 94 3/4 / 93 7/8 / **93**; 1923 / 93 / High / **93** / 90 / 91 1/2 / 90 1/2 / 90 1/2 / 89 1/2 / 86 / 84 1/2 / 82 1/2 / 86 / 86 5/8 / 84 1/2; 1923 / 80 / Low / 92 1/2 / 89 1/4 / 90 / 90 / 88 1/4 / 87 1/2 / 85 / 82 / **80** / **80** / 83 1/8 / 82; 1924 / 90 / High / 87 1/2 / **90** / 89 1/2 / 85 1/2 / 8 / 80 / 79 1/2 / 78 3/4 / 76 1/2 / 76 1/4 / 75 1/2 / 84 3/8; 1924 / 70 / Low / 82 / 83 1/2 / 85 1/2 / 80 / **70** / 75 1/8 / 74 1/2 / 76 / 74 1/2 / 75 1/2 / 73 / 75; 1925 / 83 1/2 / High / **83 1/2** / **83 1/2** / 82 / 70 / 66 / 76 3/4 / 68 / 70 / 65 1/2 / 80 / 79 / 79; 1925 / 60 / Low / 82 1/8 / 83 / 73 3/4 / 65 / 64 / 63 7/8 / 61 1/4 / **60** / 63 / 61 3/4 / 65 / 71 1/8; 1926 / 73 3/4 / High / 72 / 73 1/2 / **73 3/4** / 70 / 71 / 55 / 53 / 53 1/2 / 55 / 52 1/8 / 52 3/8 / 51; 1926 / 49 / Low / 68 / 71 / 67 1/2 / 65 1/2 / 55 / 51 1/4 / 50 1/8 / 49 1/2 / 49 7/8 / 50 / 49 3/4 / **49**; 1927 / 50 / High / **50** / 47 3/4 / 44 / 38 3/4 / 38 / 25 1/4 / 37 / 39 3/8 / 39; 1927 / 24 / Low / 49 7/8 / 46 3/4 / 38 / 35 3/4 / **24** / 24 7/8 / 25 7/8 / 37 1/8 / 37 1/8; Iron Ore Shipments by Mine (tons): Range / Menominee / / / / Mesabi / Marquette; / Munro Iron Mining Co; Year / Hiawatha / Munro / Chicagon / Rogers / Susquehanna / ???; 1893 / 1,683; 1894 / 0; 1895 / 1,201; 1900 / 11,008; 1901 / 20,355; 1902 / 74,596; 1903 / 53,828 / (Note: 80 acres leased from the Beaver Iron Mining Co. for 20 years from Jan 1, 1903 with 10 cents per ton royalty and $10,000 annual minimum.)8,739; 1904 / 38,288 / 32,332; 1905 / 9,704 / 92,183; 1906 / (Note: Buffalo & Susquehanne Iron obtained an option on the Hiawatha mine in the beginning of 1906 and exercised it at the end of 1906. The company some time before Dec 1907 spent $400,000 from the proceeds of a $1,500,000 20-year 5% bond issue dated Jan 2, 1906 to acquire 160 acres of ore lands near Iron River through its wholly owned subsidiary Munro Iron Mining Co. Adjoining to the land owned in fee were 40 acres leased for 30 years from Oct 17, 1906 with 28 cents per ton royalty and $9,000 annual minimum.)20 / 47,454 / / / (Note: The mine was originally opened up by the Rogers-Brown Iron Co. The land was leased for 50 years from Oct 1, 1902 with a royalty of 25 cents per ton and $25,000 annual minimum.)20,984; 1907 / 0 / 46,834 / / / 137,207; 1908 / 138,190 / 27,773 / / / 182,352; 1909 / 136,739 / 23,241 / / / 243,049; 1910 / 128,884 / 20,022 / / / 176,869; 1911 / 116,736 / 9,303 / (Note: 160 acres leased for 30 years from July 1, 1909 with a royalty of 7% of highest Cleveland ore market price and $5,000 annual minimum.)108,947 / / 147,741; 1912 / 220,106 / 20,100 / 149,619 / / 583,910; 1913 / 160,510 / 18,508 / 137,002 / / 904,019; 1914 / 91,369 / 0 / 114,848 / (Note: The mine was covered by 3 leases: Swanson lease: 80 acres for 30 years from May 29, 1908, later extended to 1968. Non-trivial royalty terms.; Paulson lease: 40 acres for 30 years from July 1, 1909 with 20 cents per ton royalty and annual minmum of $1,500; Schiebler lease: 40 acres for 30 years from Sep 4, 1909 with 25 cents per ton royalty and annual minimum of $4,000)27,080 / 906,913; 1915 / 93,455 / 0 / 155,711 / 53,158 / 618,498; 1916 / 187,070 / 17,621 / 100,640 / 81,842 / 764,249; 1917 / 62,847 / 46,960 / 90,786 / 117,323 / 609,198; 1918 / 176,962 / 53,031 / 109,574 / 84,196 / 569,630; 1919 / 86,138 / 30,919 / 82,655 / 50,341 / 459,749; 1920 / 125,030 / 45,971 / 135,700 / 94,061 / 545,746; 1921 / 41,503 / 0 / 83 / 0 / 0; 1922 / 126,885 / 35,263 / 48,744 / 193,845 / 473,818; 1923 / 146,257 / idle / / 199,028 / 617,616; 1924 / 196,427 / idle / / 218,698 / 494,603; 1925 / 263,054 / idle / / 215,093 / 206,872; 1926 / 191,716 / idle / / 254,175 / 528,500; 1927 / 169,755 / idle / / 285,922 / 632,345; 1928 / 171,062 / idle / / 179,927 / 505,094; 1929 / 208,960 / idle / / 323,883 / 606,124; Total / 3,400,338 / 576,254 / 1,234,339 / 2,378,572 / 10,933,076; Sykesville Coal Mine: Year / Coal / / / Coke / / Beehives / / Men / Days Active / / Accidents; Year / Total / Local Use / Shipped to Market / Coal Used / Made / Active / Total / Men / Mine / Ovens / Fatal / NF; 1904 / 7,485 / 6,625 / 0 / 860 / 0 / n/a / 100 / 81 / 236 / / 0; 1905 / 122,905 / 14,532 / 1,369 / 107,004 / 72,619 / n/a / 200 / 308 / 283 / / 1 / 7; 1906 / 109,807 / 14,643 / 1,728 / 93,436 / 63,426 / n/a / 200 / 240 / 170 / / 0 / 2; 1907 / 190,660 / 17,121 / 11,760 / 161,779 / 115,476 / n/a / 200 / 235 / 289 / / 0 / 6; 1908 / 194,059 / 13,745 / 55,806 / 124,509 / 85,422 / n/a / 200 / 269 / 227 / / 0 / 2; 1909 / 283,196 / 19,763 / 84,344 / 179,089 / 123,108 / n/a / 200 / 307 / 295 / / 0 / 9; 1910 / 254,149 / 20,153 / 52,671 / 181,316 / 123,171 / n/a / 200 / 288 / 265 / / 0 / 3; 1911 / 220,140 / 20,991 / 11,141 / 188,008 / 126,181 / n/a / 200 / 270 / 251 / / 21 / 3; 1912 / 205,963 / 19,377 / 24,921 / 161,665 / 108,382 / n/a / 200 / 267 / 243 / / 0 / 1; 1913 / 211,297 / 22,448 / 7,055 / 181,794 / 116,910 / n/a / (Note: 200 coke ovens owned by Sykesville Coal Co. and leased to Cascade Coal & Coke.)400 / 287 / 242 / / 0 / 1; 1914 / 410,082 / 40,844 / 478 / 368,760 / 268,243 / n/a / 400 / 462 / 256 / / 2 / 3; 1915 / 488,756 / 33,449 / 0 / 455,307 / 318,643 / n/a / 400 / 510 / 303 / / 1 / 5; 1916 / 405,335 / 26,184 / 5,824 / 373,327 / 263,666 / 371 / 400 / 421 / 289 / 275 / 1 / 1; 1917 / 418,064 / 26,852 / 8,362 / 382,750 / 266,579 / 393 / 400 / 428 / 293 / 284 / 4 / 6; 1918 / 385,450 / 25,079 / 10,167 / 350,204 / 240,747 / 383 / 400 / 423 / 290 / 281 / 3 / 0; 1919 / 302,599 / 21,263 / 34,322 / 247,014 / 170,100 / 349 / 400 / 438 / 238 / 207 / 1 / 1; 1920 / 371,121 / 23,843 / 16,424 / 330,854 / 237,064 / 366 / 400 / 408 / 293 / 296 / 2 / 6; 1921 / 163,206 / 15,747 / 2,561 / 144,898 / 99,298 / 285 / 400 / 358 / 158 / 162 / 0 / 1; 1922 / 192,564 / 17,036 / 4,629 / 170,899 / 115,093 / 389 / 400 / 387 / 170 / 170 / 0 / 2; 1923 / 397,852 / 26,167 / 6,416 / 365,269 / 255,012 / 394 / 400 / 423 / 281 / 295 / 1 / 1; 1924 / 262,375 / 18,610 / 3,976 / 239,789 / 162,305 / 398 / 400 / 433 / 189 / 210 / 0; 1925 / 365,185 / 28,838 / 3,647 / 332,700 / 221,633 / 398 / 400 / 415 / 232 / 305 / 1 / 5; 1926 / 191,780 / 14,363 / 11,690 / 165,727 / 111,980 / 374 / 400 / 398 / 138 / 134 / 1 / n/a; Tyler Coal Mine: Year / Coal / / / Coke / / Beehives / / Men / Days Active / / Accidents; Year / Total / Local Use / Shipped to Market / Coal Used / Made / Active / Total / Men / Mine / Ovens / Fatal / NF; 1904 / 51,111 / 1,250 / 49,861 / 0 / 0 / n/a / 100 / 343 / 52 / / 0 / 2; 1905 / 102,142 / 3,809 / 1,329 / 97,004 / 56,649 / n/a / 200 / 282 / 193 / / 1 / 0; 1906 / 204,725 / 5,814 / 8,427 / 190,485 / 104,589 / n/a / 400 / 449 / 208 / / 1 / 0; 1907 / 290,093 / 8,512 / 3,831 / 277,750 / 152,378 / n/a / 400 / 507 / 253 / / 0 / 2; 1908 / 229,798 / 9,770 / 89 / 219,339 / 125,679 / n/a / 400 / 467 / 187 / / 0 / 2; 1909 / 367,852 / 16,433 / 0 / 351,419 / 201,193 / n/a / 400 / 617 / 281 / / 1 / 2; 1910 / 301,825 / 13,849 / 0 / 287,976 / 161,617 / n/a / 400 / 577 / 255 / / 0 / 1; 1911 / 330,173 / 15,133 / 9 / 315,031 / 174,642 / n/a / 400 / 553 / 263 / / 1 / 1; 1912 / 316,253 / 14,874 / 291 / 301,088 / 171,506 / n/a / 400 / 543 / 254 / / 0 / 4; 1913 / 327,938 / 14,901 / 291 / 312,746 / 186,290 / n/a / 400 / 581 / 282 / / 0; 1914 / 315,977 / 14,655 / 0 / 301,322 / 177,339 / n/a / 400 / 659 / 231 / / 0; 1915 / 452,914 / 18,533 / 0 / 434,381 / 261,640 / n/a / 400 / 723 / 295 / / 0 / 12; 1916 / 333,722 / 14,715 / 0 / 319,007 / 190,306 / 354 / 400 / 516 / 265 / 256 / 0 / 8; 1917 / 246,220 / 11,692 / 0 / 234,528 / 138,612 / 254 / 400 / 370 / 273 / 259 / 0 / 4; 1918 / 250,538 / 11,835 / 0 / 238,703 / 134,342 / 284 / 400 / 387 / 285 / 279 / 0 / 2; 1919 / 226,737 / 10,909 / 27,540 / 188,288 / 105,100 / 316 / 400 / 431 / 232 / 199 / 0 / 2; 1920 / 241,642 / 15,942 / 31,337 / 194,363 / 115,224 / 232 / 400 / 342 / 290 / 208 / 0 / 1; 1921 / 49,436 / 4,028 / 0 / 45,408 / 26,753 / 264 / 400 / 394 / 63 / 54 / 0; 1922 / 60,645 / 6,062 / 0 / 54,583 / 31,631 / 297 / 400 / 352 / 77 / 73 / 0; 1923 / 221,198 / 23,277 / 5,205 / 192,716 / 127,603 / 290 / 400 / 377 / 250 / 260 / 2 / 0; 1924 / 76,259 / 9,246 / 1,550 / 65,463 / 39,422 / 196 / 400 / 321 / 75 / 102 / 0 / 1; 1925 / 30,135 / 3,982 / 2,763 / 23,390 / 14,085 / 190 / 400 / 233 / 48 / 50 / 0 / 1; 1926 / 167,305 / 16,766 / 13,262 / 137,277 / 85,395 / 200 / 400 / 269 / 246 / 227 / 1 / n/a; Buffalo & Susquehanna Steamship Co: Name / Type / Launched / Builder; Frank H. Goodyear / 416ft / Aug 23, 1902 / American Shipbuilding Company Lorain; Frank H. Goodyear / sank after collision with steamer James B. Wood 35 miles off Pointe Aux Barques (Lake Huron) May 23, 1910 with 17 dead.; Stephen M. Clement / 500ft 8,500ton (Note: Identical to Ball Brothers and Philip Minch also launched at AmShip Lorain) / May 20, 1905 / AmShip Lorain; Hugh Kennedy / 552ft 10,000ton / Jan 26, 1907 / AmShip Lorain; Buffalo Steamship Co (Note: renamed Jan 6, 1911.): William C. Agnew / 10,400ton bulk freighter + passenger / Feb 11, 1911 / AmShip Lorain; Frank H. Goodyear / 600ft 12,000ton / Apr 26, 1917 / Great Lakes Engineering Works; During the winter season with passage through the Great Lakes ore route blocked the ships could be used as floating warehouses. Boland & Cornelius bought the 4 ships (40,900 tons) in September 1922 and now had 17 steamers (145,000 tons) and were sixth largest vessel operator on the Great Lakes.

=== Pig Iron Industry in New York ===
Iron smelting grew explosively in the state between 1904 and 1906.

Pig Iron Shipped from Blast Furnaces in New York
Year	Long Tons	Furnaces			
Year	Long Tons	Jun 30	Dec 31		
Year	Long Tons	In Blast		Out	Total
1902	401,369				
1903	552,917				
1904	605,709				
1905	1,198,068				
1906	1,552,659	18	17	8	25
1907	1,659,752	17	(Note: Panic of 1907)9	17	26
1908	1,019,495	8	15	12	27
1909	1,733,675	15	17	11	28
1910	1,938,407	18	15	14	29
1911	1,562,756	15	13	16	29
1912	1,939,231	17	19	10	29
1913		20	12	16	28
1914		13	12	15	27
1915	2,010,076	16	18	9	27
1916	2,289,608	20	18	9	27
1917	2,276,367	21	21	4	25
1918	2,482,450	24	23	4	27
1919	1,854,549	15	16	11	27
1920	2,415,627	21	16	11	27
1921	786,713	(Note: Recession of 1920-1921)3	10	17	27
1922	1,708,605	13	15	12	27
1923	2,426,522	24	18	10	28
1924	1,914,545	9	15	12	27
1925	2,151,036	10	17	10	27
1926	2,389,665	15	16	10	26
1927	2,401,432	15	14	11	25
1928	2,369,814	13	13	10	23
1929	2,626,771	16	11	10	21
1930	1,638,323	12	5	16	21

== Producers Steamship Company ==
Incorporated July 8, 1916 in Ohio.

Name	Type	Launched	Builder
Abraham Stearn; Edward N. Saunders Jr^{1914} John C. Williams	545ft 10,000tons	Feb 28, 1906	AmShip Superior
J. Q. Riddle; J. J. Turner^{1914} George R. Fink	552ft 10,000tons	Jun 30, 1906	AmShip Lorain
Sheldon Parks; Edward Uhrig^{1914} David M. Weir	552ft 10,000tons	Dec 22, 1906	AmShip Superior
William A. Hawgood; R. L. Agassiz		Oct 19, 1907	AmShip Chicago
Quincy A. Shaw; Edmund W. Mudge		May 17, 1911	AmShip Lorain
Louis W. Hill	550ft 10,000tons	July 14, 1917	AmShip Lorain
Carmi A. Thompson	554ft	Aug 18, 1917	AmShip Lorain
William A. Amberg		Sep 15, 1917	AmShip Lorain

== Michigan Steel Corp ==
Michigan Steel Corp produced sheet steel for the automobile industry. It was effectively the first finishing department of the later Great Lakes Steel Corp steel works and was apparently quite successful as an independent company from 1923 till 1931.

Profits before int. & tax
1924	$557.284
1925	$1,067,945
1926	$1,077,463
1927	$1,137,052
1928	$1,262,381
1929	$1,939,262

The company issued $500,000 in 15-year 6.75% bonds dated May 1, 1923, as collateral a sheet steel plant of 36,000 tons per year capacity valued at ca. $1 million. Incorporated in New Jersey on September 23, 1922 with George Rupert Fink president, the Ecorse, Michigan sheet mill plant on 40 acres (42.2369°N 83.1536°W (Note: Bounded by: North: Mill Street; East: main line of the Detroit and Toledo Shore Line Railroad; South: Ecorse River; West: 7th street)) and built since December 1922, began production on July 5, 1923, first and foremost as a supplier of the automobile industry. The capacity of the plant more than doubled between 1923 and 1928 (to 180,000 tons). The company issued $1,250,000 10-year 6% bonds dated November 1, 1928, to redeem all remaining $239,500 of the 1923 bonds, for plant additions and working capital (increased to $2,208,000 May 1, 1930 and called for redemption November 1, 1931.). The company also had 220,000 no par shares authorized and outstanding; 22,000 originally issued for ($1,000,000 in) cash and split 10-for-1 in July 1928; 50,000 made available in an initial public offering at $50 per share in August 1928. With over $12,000,000 market capitalization as of October 1928, was traded on the Detroit Stock Exchange from October 1928 until February 17, 1931 and on October 20, 1928, began paying a quarterly dividend of 62 1/2 cents. The company had previously paid dividends on the 22,000 shares in each of the 5 years 1924-1928, a total of $53.75 per share. The stock traded on the New York Curb Exchange for a few months and was listed on the NYSE from end of April 1929 till January 27, 1931.

Michigan Steel Corp price range (Note: 1928: 9 10 11 12 1929 1 2 4+ 1930 1931)
Year		Jan	Feb	Mar	Apr	May	Jun	Jul	Aug	Sep	Oct	Nov	Dec	Jan
1928	High									58	58	65	60	
1928	Low									51 1/4	54 5/8	55	58	
1929	High	84 3/4	105		101 3/4	105	108 1/4	122 7/8	114 3/4	112	102 7/8	73	59 7/8	
1929	Low	62 1/2	81		100 1/4	95	85	107 3/8	104	104	59	50	44	
1930	High	74 3/4	73	73 3/4	74 7/8	77	75	74 3/8	68 1/4	59 1/4	59	48	45	46 7/8
1930	Low	53	63 1/2	65 7/8	65	59	58 1/4	60 3/8	54 3/4	49 1/2	41 1/4	42 1/2	38 1/2	43 1/4

== Great Lakes Steel Corp ==
External videos
- Men and Mills (ca. 1950)

Incorporated on February 23, 1929.

Large amounts of sand had to be brought to the 275 acres of marshland in Ecorse, Michigan, to raise it sufficiently above water level.

Timeline of the Great Lakes Steel works
Year	Date	Event
1929	May 25	Excavation starts
1929	June 28	First pile driven
1929	August 14	First concrete poured
1930	August 23	first open hearth heat
1930	August 25	first ingot rolled on the blooming and billet mills
1930	September 2	first strip rolled
1931	March	14-inch merchant mill first roll (Note: cutting edge $3,500,000 Mesta 20,000 tons per month continuous bar mill.)
1931	July	10-inch merchant mill first roll
1931	August 5	NSC announced completion of work
1933		Open hearth #7 and #8 completed
1935	October	Open hearth #9, #10, #11, #12 completed
1936	March 23	Hot strip mill operating
1936	June 1	Cold strip mill operating
1938	February	Open hearth #13, #14, #15, #16 in second OH shop completed
1938	May 23	second blooming/slabbing mill operating
1938	August 16	Blast furnace #3 blown in
1938	October 6	Byproduct coke plant blown in
1941		Sintering plant begins operations
1941		Blast furnace #1 or #2 dismantled to make room for #4
1941	December 9	Blast furnace #4 blown in
1946		Bessemer converter #1, #2 for OH shop No. 1 installed
1949		Open hearth enlarged to 500 tons
1952	September 22	Blast furnace #5 blown in
1953		Bessemers for OH shop No. 2 installed
1955	January 1	new coke plant completed

== National Steel Corp ==
The National Steel Corp. (NSC) was a holding company, incorporated in Delaware on November 7, 1929. It had an authorized capital of 3,000,000 shares and 2,080,000 were issued in exchange for:

1. 1,120,000 shares or 4.7 NSC shares for each (of 237,720 outstanding) par $100 share of the Weirton Steel Company
2. 560,000 NSC shares for shares of certain Hanna subsidiaries
3. 400,000 NSC shares exchanged 1:1 for no par common shares of Great Lakes. Great Lakes shareholders also received warrants for up to 180,000 additional shares at fixed strike prices. (Note: All GLS shareholders received warrants to purchase 1/5 share for each share owned at $62.50 per share before December 31, 1929, and again before October 1, 1934. President George R. Fink received warrants for 20,000 shares at $50 before October 1, 1934, to honor his existing similar right to Great Lakes stock)

The steel industry in 1929
Company	Ingot Tons
U.S. Steel	24,201,500
Bethlehem Steel	8,000,000
Jones & Laughlin	3,270,000
Youngstown; Sheet & Tube	2,717,000
Republic; Iron & Steel	2,160,000
Inland Steel	1,800,000

National Steel thus became the 6th largest steel company of the United States with a capacity for 3,500,000 tons of iron ore, 1,750,000 tons of pig iron and 2,000,000 tons of steel ingots.

In January 1931 NSC purchased all assets and assumed all liabilities of the Michigan Steel Corp (dissolved January 15, 1931) in exchange for cash and securities in the neighborhood of $12 million. (Note: 1. $6,062,500 in 10-year 5% notes due January 1, 1941, called for redemption May 11, 1931, presumably refinanced with the Apr 1, 1931 bonds.; 2. $3,031,287 in cash; 3. 60,625 NSC shares, or at the discretion of Michigan Steel shareholders, $50 in cash per share instead. Only 7.098 shares were eventually taken and the total cash paid was $5,707,650.)

The entire outstanding share capital of these companies was owned by NSC:

- Weirton Steel Co.
- Weirton Coal Company
- The Hanna Furnace Corp (incorp. 1920 in Delaware) (Note: Owner of 2 blast furnaces in Detroit with a combined capacity of 350,000 tons per year)
- The Hanna Furnace Corp (New York) (Note: The former Buffalo Union Furnace Co (acquired in 1927, albeit had formerly been operated as a leasehold for a few years.), owner of 4 blast furnaces at Buffalo, New York with a combined 600,000 tons capacity and of 50% of the stock of the Donner Hanna Coke Co, owner of 986,000 tons per year by-product coke ovens in Buffalo)
- The Hanna Iron Ore Company (Delaware) (Note: A holding company (incorporated December 1, 1928, in Delaware). Acquired certain subsidiaries from the M. A. Hanna Co.: 100% American Boston Mining Co. (Note: Diorite, Michigan, the American mine on the Marquette range opened in 1880. 54% Fe hematite mined from a depth of 1,850ft.: 1916: 745,969 tons; 1917: 142,526; 1918: 120.756; 1919: 72,228); 100% Bates Iron Co. (Note: Northeast of Iron River, Michigan (46.114°N 88.616°W, see Sheet 13 of the 1917 Sanborn Fire Insurance Map). The Bates mine on the Menominee range opened in 1910. 54-59% hematite was mined from a depth of 1,050ft.: 1918: 98,194 tons; 1919: 91,049); 100% Hayes Mining Co. of Michigan (Note: Worked the Ashland mine in Ironwood, Michigan (46.4486°N 90.17°W; on Sheet 12 of the 1921 Sanborn Fire Insurance Map).); 100% Marting Ore Co.; 100% Hanna Iron Ore Co. (Michigan) (Note: Formerly the Munro Iron Mining Co..); 100% Mead Iron Co.; 76.7% La Rue Mining Co.; 73.3% Waukenabo Co.; 67.3% Nokay Iron Co.; 66.7% Consumers Ore Co.; 66.7% Richmond Iron Co.; 63.3% Hanna Ore Mining Co.; 60% Virginia Ore Mining Co.; 50% Buffalo Iron Mining Co.; 50% Mahland Iron Co.; 50% Wakefield Iron Co.; 25% Susquehanna Ore Co.; 20% Canisteo-Cliffs Mining Co.; 12.5% Holman-Cliffs Mining Co.; 7% Mahoning Ore & Steel Co.)
- The Producers Steamship Company (Note: Incorp. in Ohio in 1916, owned 7 ships: Agassiz; E. N. Saunders Jr; J. J. Turner; E. A. Uhrig; Q. A. Shaw; W. A. Amberg; L. W. Hill)
- Great Lakes Steel Corp
- Michigan Steel Corp (Delaware)
- Midwest Steel Corp (Note: Incorporated in Indiana February 1930 with a capital of $100,000 and was projected to become a complete 1,000-acre blast furnace and steel plant on Lake Michigan representing an investment of $40 to $50 million. Nothing ever came of it.)

NSC raised capital with $40 million 25-year 5% bonds dated April 1, 1931. The debt was refinanced in 1935 and 1939 at successively lower interest rates while the maturity date (1965) remained unchanged. (Note: On August 1, 1935, the $37 million of the bonds then outstanding (including $457,000 in the treasury) were called for redemption with the proceeds from a $50 million 30-year 4% bond issue dated June 1, 1935, which in turn were called at 105% and interest and the $47 million then outstanding redeemed at a cost of $49,350,000 from the proceeds of a $50 million 26-year 3% bond issue dated April 1, 1939.)

On August 5, 1931, NSC completed its $36.5 million expansion program, among which was the $29 million steel plant of the Great Lakes Steel Corporation.

Changes in capital structure (Aug 1932)
Company	par	Shares before	Shares after	
Hanna Furnace Corp (Del)	$10	989,500	100	property transferred to Great Lakes Steel Corp
Weirton Steel Co	$100	237,720	1,000	no change in book value of shares
Great Lakes Steel	no par	400,000	1,000	no change in book value of shares
Hanna Iron Ore Co	no par	50,000	1,000	no change in book value of shares
Producers SS Co	$100	9,600	1,000	re-incorporated in Delaware, no change in book value
Virginia Ore Mining Co	$100	60	0	

During 1933 all outstanding 2,156,832 shares of no par value were exchanged 1:1 for shares of $25 par. The authorized capital in 1939 was still 3,000,000 shares and there were then 2,199,822 outstanding. Effective March 30, 1950, the common stock was split 3-for-1.

NSC common stock price range and regular dividend payments
1930s (Note: Stock price: 0 1 2 3 4 5 6 7 8 9 Dividends: 1930-1932: 1933-1935; 7; 1938-1939)
	0	1	2	3	4	5	6	7	8	9
Low	41	18 1/2	13 1/3	15	34 1/2	40 3/8	57 1/4	55	44 3/4	52
High	62	58 1/8	33 7/8	55 1/8	58 1/4	83 3/4	78	99 1/4	81 3/4	82
Div.	$2	$2	$0.75	$0.625	$1	$1.5		$2.5	$1	$1.7
1940s (Note: Share price: 0 1 2 3 4 5 6 7 8 9)
Low	48	42	43 3/4	52	57 7/8	65	75	74 3/4	81 1/4	73 1/2
High	73 3/4	68 1/2	54	64 1/2	70	85 3/4	101 1/2	95	114 1/2	95 1/2
1950s (Note: Share price: 0 1 2 3 4 5 6 7 8 9)
Low	(Note: Before split: 88, after: 35 5/8)	43	43	40 1/8	46	58	64	49 1/2	47 1/8	74 1/4
High	(Note: Before split: 110 1/2, after: 53 1/4)	56	53	52 1/4	66	77 1/2	77 7/8	80 1/4	77 3/4	98 1/2

== Post war years ==
The post-World War II years brought about record profits for the company as steel was in high demand. The company continued to post healthy profits in the 1970s, although the latter half of the decade saw some sharp and turbulent profit slumps. The increasing consumption of imported steel was often an attributed problem. It acquired United Financial Corporation, in 1979, adding another sundry item for its portfolio. United Financial was the parent company of Citizens Savings & Loan Association of San Francisco, which was the seventh‐largest savings and loan in the United States.

== 1980s ==
Beginning in 1980, the company reported a serious loss of demand and with it profits in its core steel business. A roller coaster earnings surge the next year crashed down the year after that due to a further increase in imports and low demand. In 1983, shareholders agreed to create National Intergroup, a holding company, and merge the steel business as one many units into it. The corporate reorganization was a further step to an already initiated arrangement that started in 1982, which broke the company into six independently managed units. The move was intended to better administer the company which had become diversified away from steel into aluminum and financial services. That same year, the workers of the Weirton mill purchased their operation from National Steel, forming an independent employee-owned corporation.

In February 1984, Nippon Kokan K.K., a major Japanese steel producer, acquired 50% of National Steel from National Intergroup for US$292 million. Later in 1990, the Japanese firm would claim another 20% share from National Intergroup, which was eager to sell the steel business. The company stumbled through troubled years as it shed thousands of workers and faced bankruptcy in 1991.

Amidst the savings and loan crisis in 1981, West Side Federal Savings and Loan Association of New York and the Washington Savings and Loan Association of Miami were acquired and merged with Citizens, creating the country's largest federally chartered savings and loan association. The Federal Home Loan Bank Board approved the first interstate consolidation of savings and loan associations largely because National Steel was willing to provide $75 million in cash to the new association, whose combined assets would be $6.8 billion with 136 branches in the three states. The branches were rebranded as First Nationwide Savings in 1982, when National Steel sold a 19% share of First Nationwide to the public. Ford Motor Company acquired First Nationwide for $493 million in 1985.

National Steel spun-off its computer data subsidiary Genix which spun-off the current-day Corporate Election Services, a market leader in proxy statement and proxy fight services based in suburban Pittsburgh.

== 1990s ==
The company announced in 1991 that it would re-locate its longtime Pittsburgh headquarters to the South Bend, Indiana, area.

In 1994, the company caused a stir in the industry when it terminated nearly all of its vice presidents, President and CFO, and replaced them by hiring nearly the complete executive staff of the U.S. Steel Gary Works, including V. John Goodwin who was named the new President of National Steel. U.S. Steel was incensed and filed a lawsuit which the two companies settled out-of-court in 1995. However these drastic leadership changes were short-lived, as Goodwin resigned in 1996, the result of a bitter dispute with the Japanese ownership and by 1998 nearly all of the U.S. Steel expatriates had departed from National.

== 2000s ==
In 2000, when an internal auditor, tipped off by an informer, discovered that longtime executive James Squires was receiving millions of dollars in kickbacks from scrap suppliers. In August 2001, Squires was convicted in Federal Court of receiving kickbacks, and in 2002 was sentenced to two years imprisonment. Later he was forced to pay National approximately $3,000,000 in a civil lawsuit.

The company filed for bankruptcy protection in 2002, the result of a deep depression in the industry.

== Bankruptcy ==
The company would never again enjoy extended periods of profit and finally in March 2002, it filed for bankruptcy with only $2.3 billion in assets for $2.6 billion in debt. After a bidding war between AK Steel and U.S. Steel, in May 2003 the remains of National Steel were sold to U.S. Steel for $850 million and the assumption of $200 million in debt. US Steel continues to operate National's Keewatin, Minnesota mining operation and pellet plant under the new name of Keewatin Taconite or Keetac.

== Notes ==
- "National Steel Net $3.91 a share", Wall Street Journal, March 21, 1931
- "One Steelmaker Earns Dividends", Wall Street Journal, June 30, 1932

Battery	Ovens	Since
1	30	September 1901
2	30	November 1902
3	60	March 1906
4	12	1909

1911	108,947
1912	149,619
1913	137,002
1914	114,848
1915	155,711
1916	100,640
Total	766,767

Year	Tons
1913	316,019
1914	293,296
1915	323,464
1916	427,182
1917	426,819
1918	376,988
