= Swan Island (Michigan) =

Island in Michigan

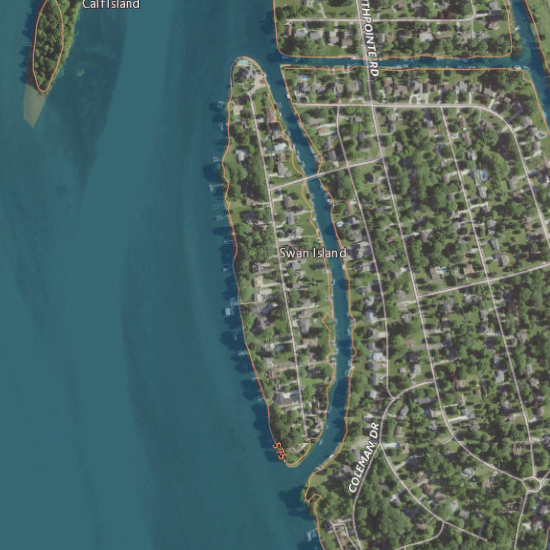
- USGS aerial imagery of Swan Island

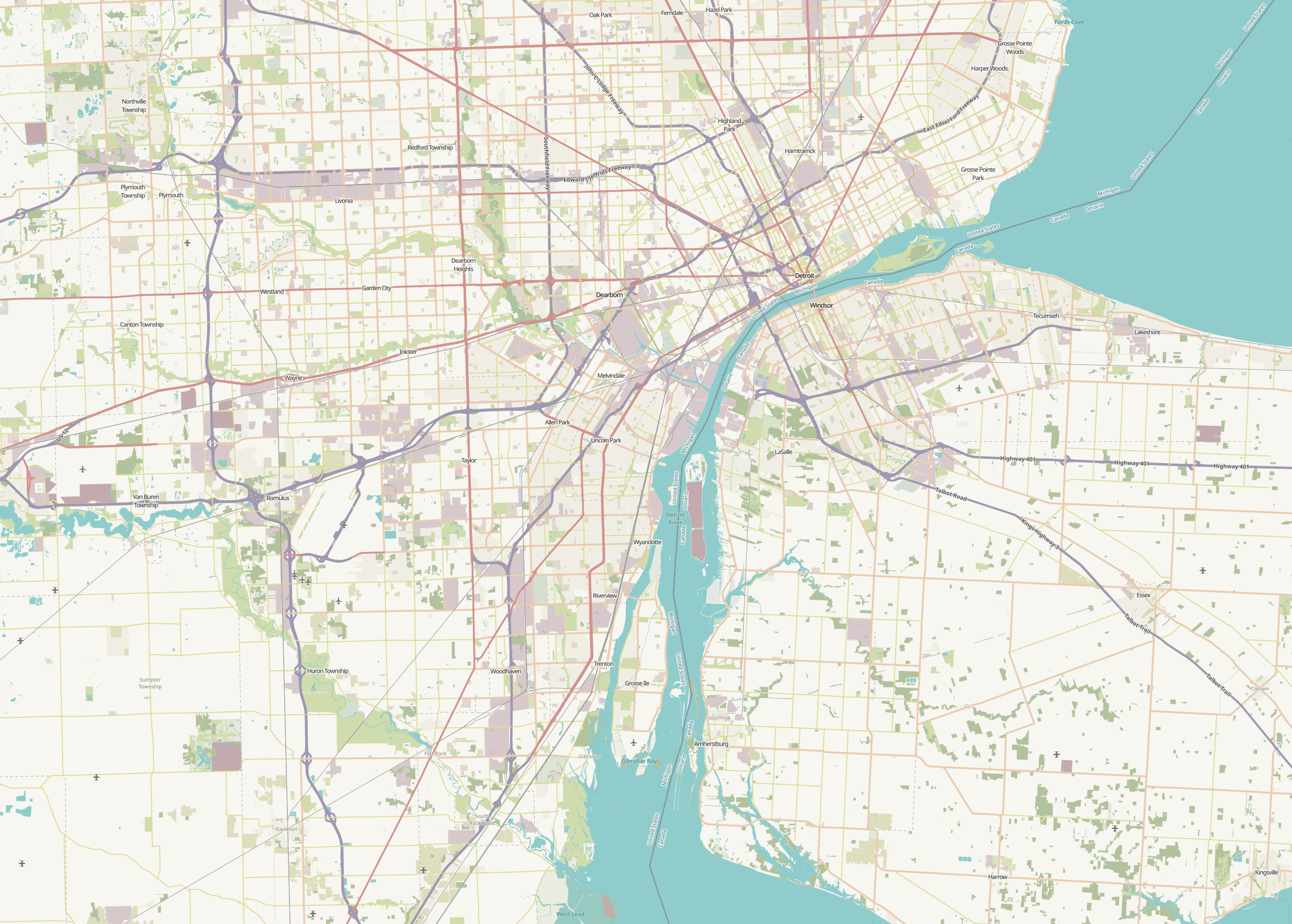
- Location within Wayne County, Michigan Location within Michigan Location within the United States

Geography
- Location: Michigan
- Coordinates: 42°05′57″N 83°10′27″W
- Highest elevation: 581 ft (177.1 m)

Administration
- United States
- State: Michigan
- County: Wayne

Swan Island is an island in the Detroit River. It is in Wayne County, in southeast Michigan. Its coordinates are 42°05′57″N 83°10′27″W, and the United States Geological Survey gave its elevation as 581 ft (177 m) in 1980. A 1982 report from the U.S. Fish and Wildlife Service said that white bass had been spawning at the island since the 1920s.
