= Humbug Marsh =

- Wetland
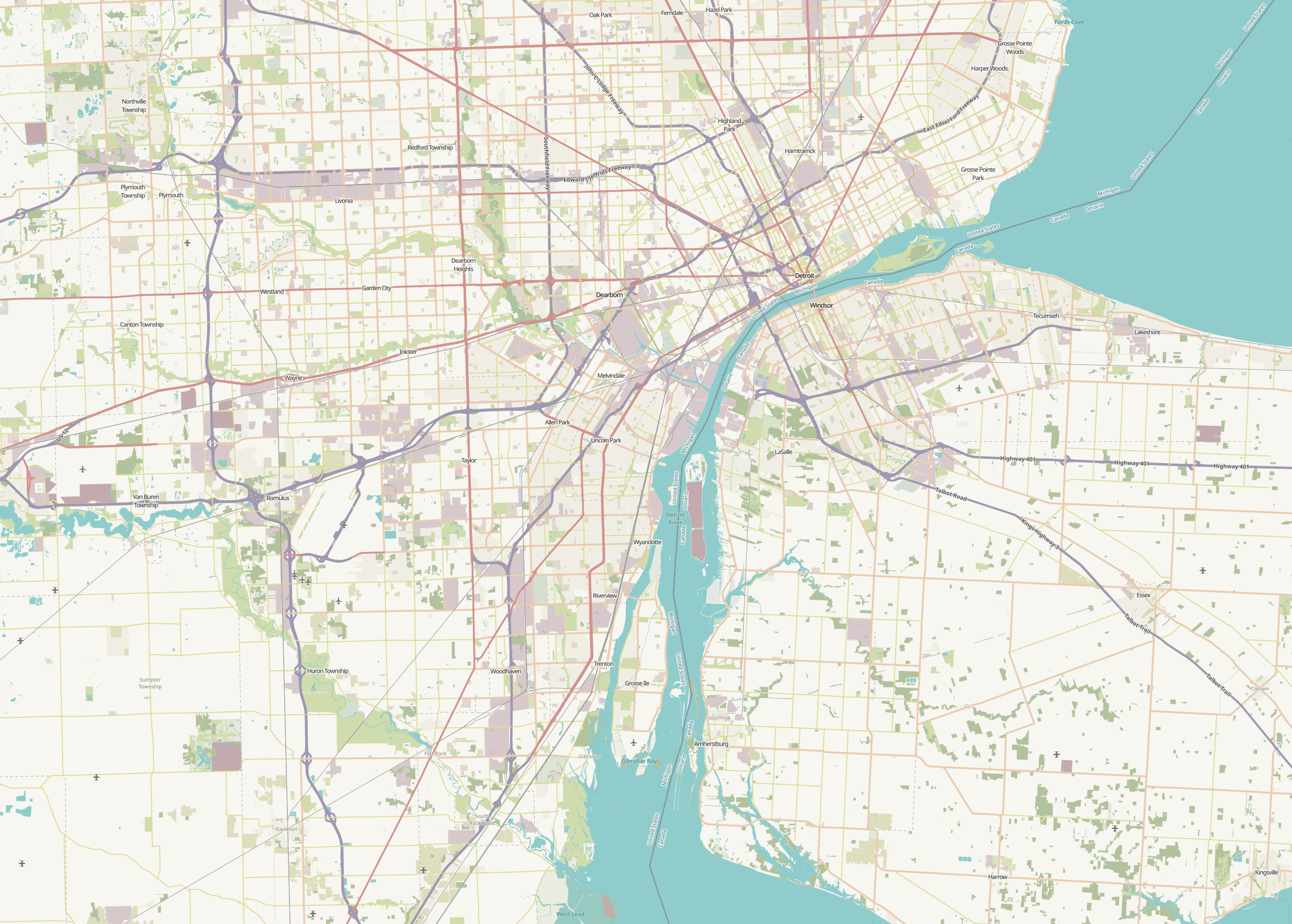
- Coordinates: 42°06′57″N 83°11′18″W
- Location: Gibraltar and Trenton, Wayne County, Michigan, United States

Ramsar Wetland
- Designated: 20 January 2010
- Reference no.: 1928

Humbug Marsh, a 1.88 square kilometres (0.73 sq mi) wetland in southeastern Wayne County, Michigan, is a constituent element of the Detroit River International Wildlife Refuge. It is listed as a Ramsar wetland of international importance.

Although Humbug Marsh is located within heavily populated Metro Detroit, it is acclaimed as a high-quality remnant of the wetlands that once lined both sides of the international Detroit River. This slow-flowing river was a hotspot of biological diversity, particularly as a location for fish spawning. The remnant marsh is classified as a place of "importance to threatened, endangered, and vulnerable species and ecological communities."

Humbug Marsh is located on the Downriver shoreline of the Detroit River, straddling the boundary line between Gibraltar and Trenton in southeastern Wayne County, Michigan. A small offshore island (Humbug Island) is included within the official boundaries of the marsh.

The Humbug Marsh parking lot is located at 5437 West Jefferson Avenue, Trenton, Michigan.
