= Diorite, Michigan =

- Unincorporated community
- Location within the state of Michigan Diorite (the United States)
- Coordinates: 46°30′33″N 87°49′49″W
- Country: United States
- State: Michigan
- County: Marquette
- Township: Ely
- Elevation: 1,572 ft (479 m)
- Time zone: UTC-5 (Eastern (EST))
  - Summer (DST): UTC-4 (EDT)
- ZIP code(s): 49814 (Champion)
- Area code: 906
- GNIS feature ID: 624690

Diorite is an unincorporated community in Marquette County in the U.S. state of Michigan. The community is located within Ely Township. As an unincorporated community, Diorite has no legally defined boundaries or population statistics of its own.

== History ==
Diorite contained a post office between 1888 and 1940. The community was named for deposits of the diorite rock in the area.
