= M-56 (1919–1957 Michigan highway) =

Former state highway in Michigan

M-56
- M-56 highlighted in red on a map of modern roadways

Route information
- Maintained by MDOT
- Length: 16.426 mi (26.435 km)
- Existed: c. July 1, 1919–1957

Major junctions
- South end: US 24 in Monroe
- US 25 in Monroe US 24A near Detroit Beach US 24A in Rockwood
- North end: US 24 / US 25 in Flat Rock

Location
- Country: United States
- State: Michigan
- Counties: Monroe, Wayne

Highway system
- Michigan State Trunkline Highway System; Interstate; US; State; Byways
| ← M-55 | → M-56 |

M-56 was a state trunkline highway in the southeastern part of the US state of Michigan. It existed from 1919 until 1957. The highway ran north from Monroe, where it connected with US Highway 24 (US 24, Telegraph Road), to Flat Rock where it terminated at an intersection with US 24/US 25. Before a series of truncations in the 1950s, the highway continued along the Huron River to New Boston and Belleville. The trunkline was progressively scaled back to Flat Rock before being decommissioned in 1957.

== Route description ==
When it was decommissioned in 1957, M-56 started at an intersection with US 24 (Telegraph Road) on the west side of Monroe. From there, the trunkline ran southeasterly along Elm Avenue to an intersection with US 25 (Dixie Highway, now M-125) in downtown. M-56 also intersected US 24A (now Interstate 75, I-75) just outside town. The highway continued northeasterly past Sterling State Park and along Brest Bay in the communities of Detroit Beach and Woodland Beach. Turning inland near Stony Point, the trunkline followed Dixie Highway across the Swan Creek. North of the creek, Dixie Highway met US Turnpike, and M-56 followed Dixie Highway northward into South Rockwood. In that village, the trunkline turned northeasterly parallel to US 24 to cross the Huron River. On the north side of the river, M-56 followed the southernmost end of Fort Street to Huron River Drive, turning northwesterly along the latter road. The highway ran through an intersection with US 24A and parallel to the river into Flat Rock, where it terminated at the intersection with US 24/US 25 (Telegraph Road, now just US 24).

== History ==
When the state highway system was first signposted in 1919, M-56 was assigned to roadways that ran northeasterly from the Ohio state line to the Belleville area. When the United States Numbered Highway System was created on November 11, 1926, the southern section between the state line and Monroe was redesignated as a section of US 25. In the 1940s, the northern end was rerouted north from New Boston to follow M-112 along the Willow Run Expressway (now I-94 and part of the Detroit Industrial Freeway) into Belleville north to US 112. In late 1954 or early 1955, the northern end was changed again, this time truncating the highway to end at New Boston. The northern end was shortened again to terminate at US 24/US 25 in Flat Rock in 1956. The remainder of the highway from Monroe to Flat Rock was removed and decommissioned from the state highway system the next year, becoming county roads under the jurisdiction of Monroe and Wayne counties.

== Major intersections ==
| County | Location | mi | km | Destinations | Notes |
|---|---|---|---|---|---|
| Monroe | Monroe | 0.000 | 0.000 | US 24 (Telegraph Road) – Toledo, Detroit | |
| Monroe | Monroe | 1.031 | 1.659 | US 25 – Toledo, Detroit | Now M-125 |
| Monroe | Monroe | 3.414 | 5.494 | US 24A – Toledo, Detroit | Now I-75 |
| Wayne | Rockwood | 15.870 | 25.540 | US 24A – Toledo, Detroit | Now I-75 |
| Wayne | Flat Rock | 16.426 | 26.435 | US 24 / US 25 | Now just US 24 |
1.000 mi = 1.609 km; 1.000 km = 0.621 mi
