= Jefferson Schools =

School district in Michigan, US

Address
- 5707 Williams Road Newport, Monroe County, Michigan, 48166; United States
- Coordinates: 41°55′59″N 83°20′05″W

District information
- Grades: PreKindergarten–12
- Superintendent: Amy Gee
- Schools: 4
- Budget: $21,630,000 2022–2023 expenditures
- NCES District ID: 2619800

Students and staff
- Students: 1,371 (2024–2025)
- Teachers: 74.67 (on an FTE basis) (2024–2025)
- Staff: 175.92 FTE (2024–2025)
- Student–teacher ratio: 18.36 (2024–2025)
- District mascot: Bears
- Colors: Blue & Gold

Other information
- Website: www.jeffersonschools.org

Jefferson Schools is a public school district in Monroe County, Michigan. It serves parts of the townships of Berlin and Frenchtown. It also serves four communities along the Lake Erie shoreline: Detroit Beach, Estral Beach, Stony Point, and Woodland Beach.

== History ==
The district was formed in the summer of 1947, when seven small, independent school districts consolidated. A temporary building was immediately constructed for middle grade students. By 1950, a permanent ten-room school had been built, and the temporary school, Havekost and Brest Schools were still in use as well. An addition to the school was built in 1953, at more than twice the expense of the original building.

In 1955, a new elementary school was built on Hurd Road to house kindergarten through third grade.

The current high school opened in fall 1961. The school initially went to grade eleven, and Jefferson seniors attended Monroe Public Schools for grade twelve until fall 1962. Additions to the high school and middle school were built in 1973.

By 1991, Jefferson Schools was the richest district in Michigan in terms of per-pupil spending, due to the local tax revenue windfall of the Enrico Fermi Nuclear Generating Station. The district had just opened North Elementary, and additions were being planned at other schools. The district's curriculum was diverse and a community recreation program was used by 1,200 families. But the district was cited as an example of inequities in Michigan's school funding laws, which were changed through an amendment to the Constitution of Michigan in 1994 called Proposal A.

== Schools ==
Schools in Jefferson Schools
School	Address	Notes
Jefferson High School	5707 Williams Road, Newport	Grades 9–12
Jefferson Middle School	5102 North Stoney Creek Road, Monroe	Grades 5-8
North Elementary	8281 North Dixie Highway, Newport	Grades 2-4
Sodt Elementary	2888 Nadeau Road, Monroe	Grades PreK-1
Jefferson Schools Early Middle College		Post-secondary program in association with Monroe County Community College.
