= Frenchtown Charter Township, Michigan =

Frenchtown Township, Michigan
- Charter township
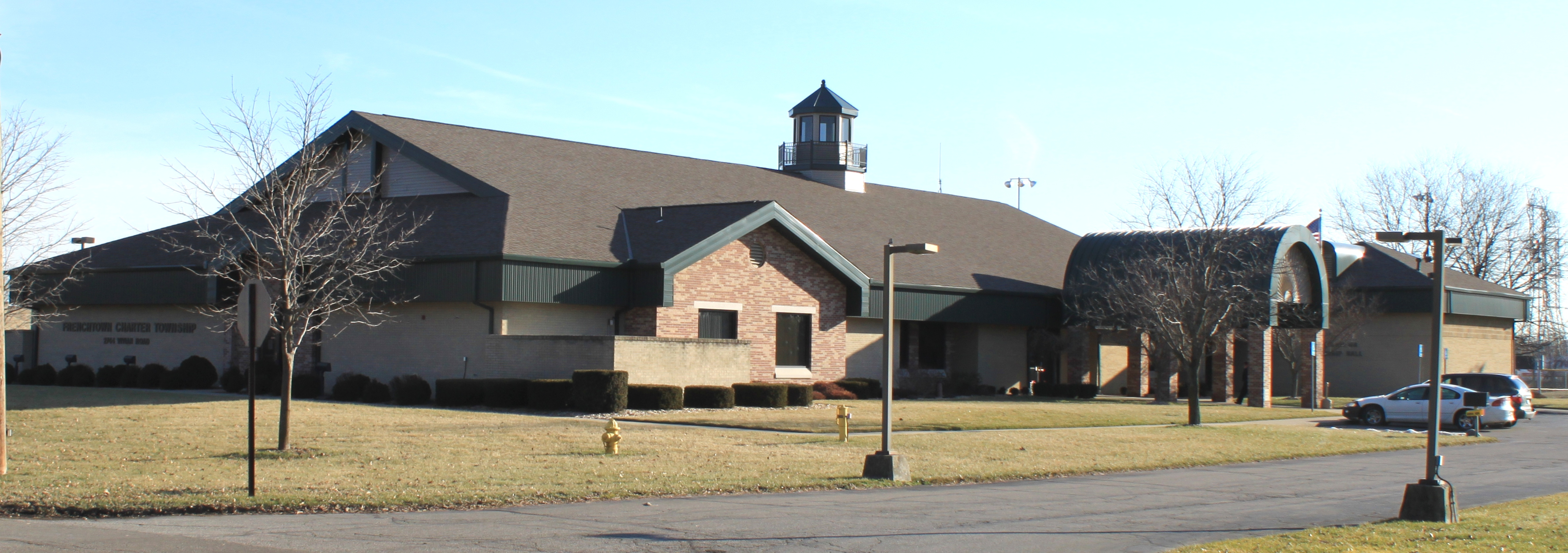
- Frenchtown Township Hall

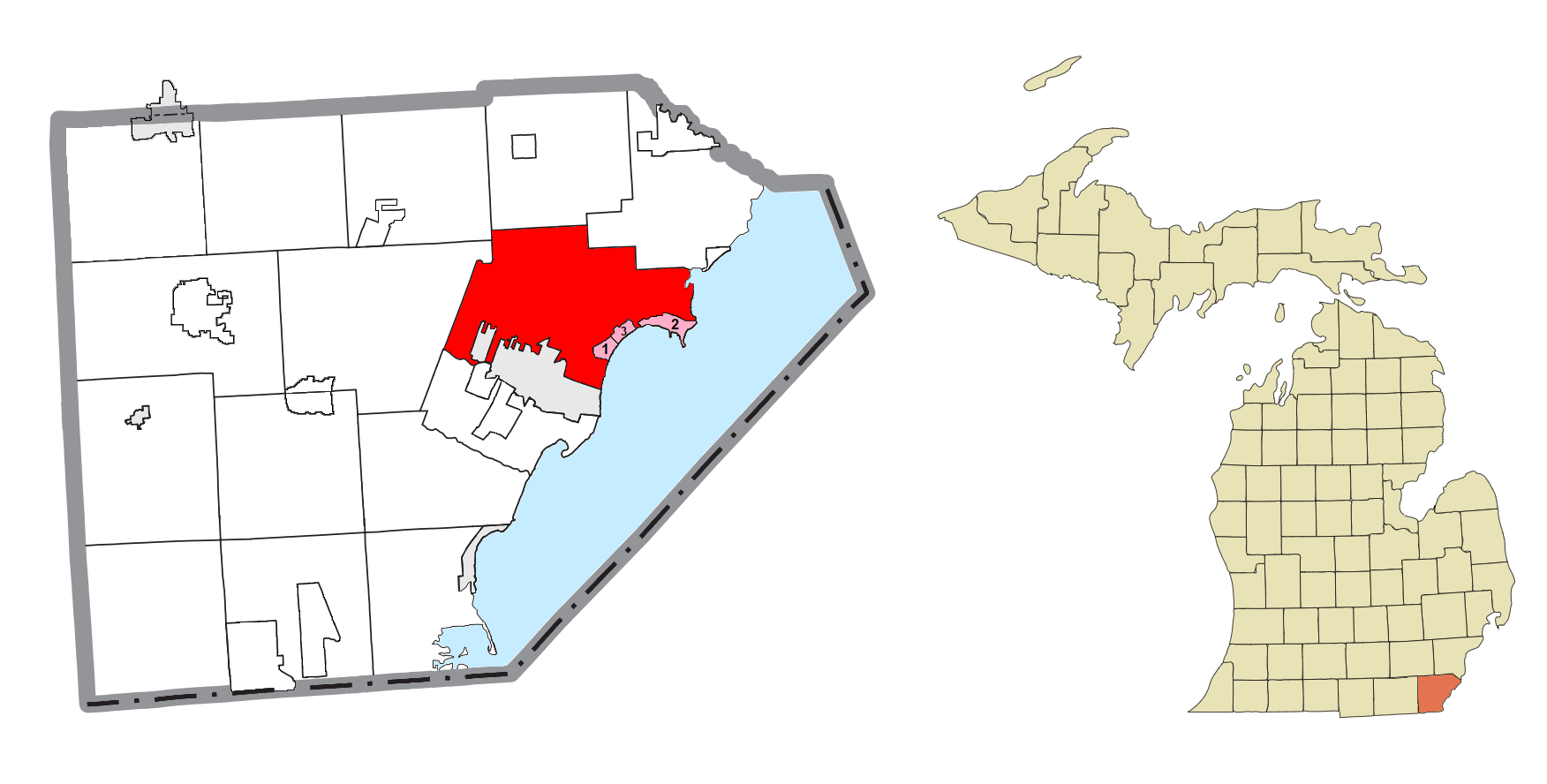
- Location within Monroe County and the administered CDPs of Detroit Beach (1), Stony Point (2), and Woodland Beach (3)

- Location within Michigan Location within the United States
- Coordinates: 41°57′50″N 83°21′31″W
- Country: United States
- State: Michigan
- County: Monroe
- Settled: 1784
- Organized: 1837

Government
  - Supervisor: James McDevitt
  - Clerk: Mark Baker

Area
  - Total: 43.12 sq mi (111.7 km^{2})
  - Land: 41.74 sq mi (108.1 km^{2})
  - Water: 1.38 sq mi (3.6 km^{2})
- Elevation: 594 ft (181 m)

Population (2020)
  - Total: 21,609
  - Density: 517.7/sq mi (199.9/km^{2})
- Time zone: UTC-5 (Eastern (EST))
  - Summer (DST): UTC-4 (EDT)
- ZIP Codes: 48162 (Monroe); 48166 (Newport); 48117 (Carleton)
- Area code: 734
- FIPS code: 26-115-30820
- GNIS feature ID: 1626321
- Website: frenchtownmi.gov

Frenchtown Charter Township is a charter township within Monroe County in the U.S. state of Michigan. The population was 21,609 as per the 2020 census.

The township is bordered on the south by the city of Monroe. Sterling State Park and the Enrico Fermi Nuclear Generating Station are located within Frenchtown.

== History ==
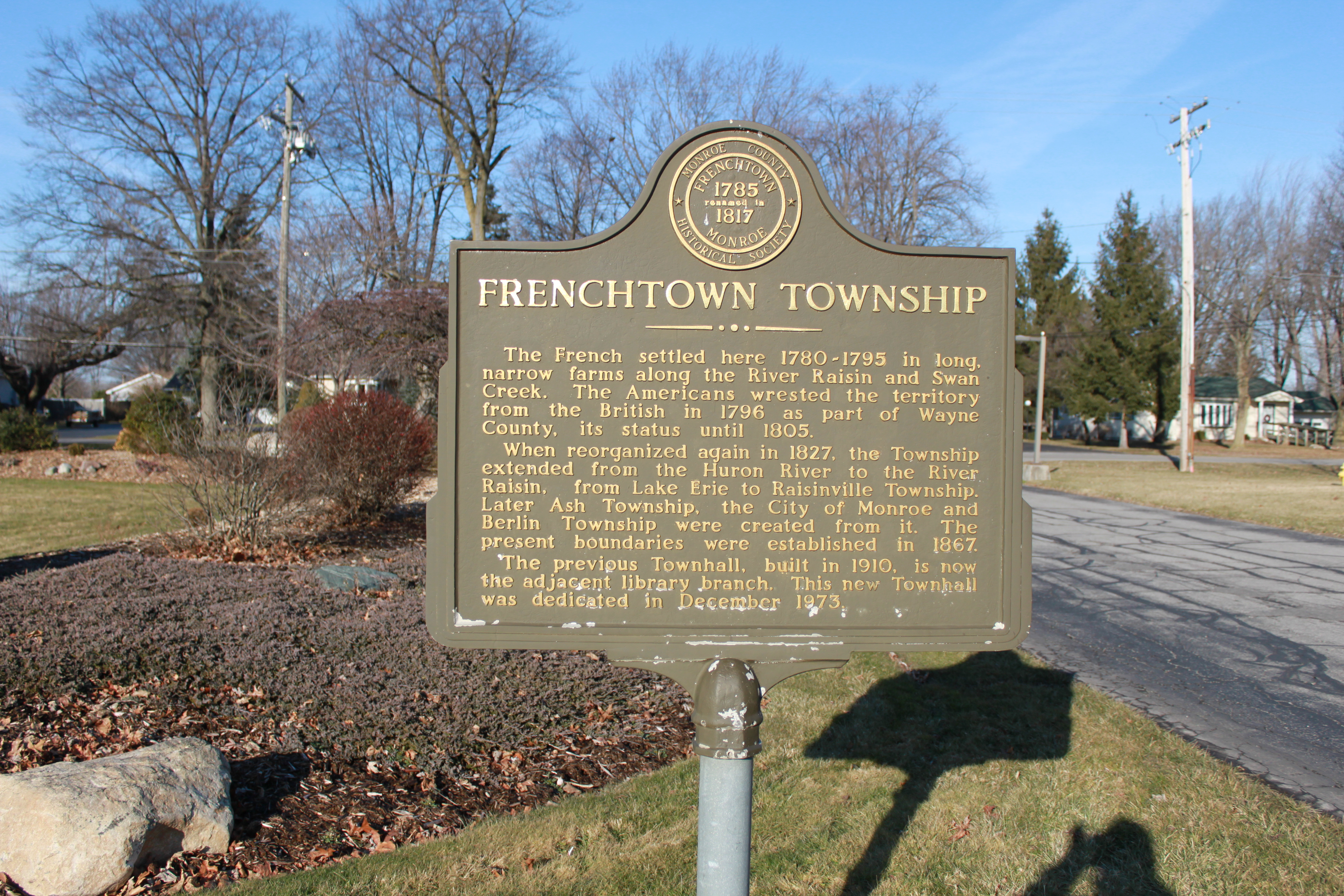
Frenchtown Township historical marker

The area was long occupied by Native Americans, including the historic Potawatomi. They had trading relations with French-Canadians in the area. The Frenchtown area reflected the ethnicity of its first European settlers, French Canadians who took land along the banks of the River Raisin as early as 1784. There had been other French colonial settlements closer to Detroit and on both sides of the Detroit River. Their descendants are known as Muskrat French. Around the same time, the Sandy Creek Settlement was founded near this by Joseph Porlier Benec. The United States acquired this area, which had been considered part of British Canadian territory after the Treaty of Paris (1783) settling the American Revolutionary War. It was specifically part of state claims (from 1783); the Northwest Territory (1787); Indiana Territory (1803); Michigan Territory (1805); and, finally, the State of Michigan (1837).

During the War of 1812, the area was the site of the Battle of Frenchtown, in which 397 Americans were killed by the coalition of British Army and Native Americans; this was the highest number of American fatalities of any battle during the war. The battlefield site today is within the River Raisin National Battlefield Park, which was designated in 2009 and falls within the present-day city limits of Monroe.

In 1817, that portion of Frenchtown was renamed and incorporated as the village of Monroe, named in honor of President James Monroe's planned visit to the Michigan Territory later that year. In the same year, the village of Monroe was named as the county seat of the newly created Monroe County. Monroe was incorporated as a city in 1837. At that time, the remaining area known as Frenchtown was reorganized as a township, encompassing much of the northern portion of the county which was the area from the River Raisin to the Huron River at Wayne County's southern border. Shortly afterwards, the northern portion of the township was broken off to form Ash Township. Later, by 1867, Berlin Charter Township was formed from another territory of the township. Additionally, the city of Monroe annexed pieces of the southern portion of Frenchtown several times. As a result, the boundary between the current Frenchtown Charter Township and the city limits of Monroe is jagged.

== Communities ==
- Brest is a former settlement located along the shores of Lake Erie. It was settled as a port by the French as early as 1810 and named after Brest, France. In 1836, the Gibralter & Flat Rock Company developed the area of Brest and Gibralter to the north. The community of Brest had its own post office from July 15, 1836, to July 8, 1863, and again from February 28, 1890, to August 15, 1903. Gibralter succeeded and later became the city of Gibraltar, but the Brest port failed. Brest can be seen on a 1911 map of Monroe County in what is now the community of Stony Point.
- Detroit Beach is an unincorporated community and census-designated place located at 41°55′53″N 83°19′50″W.
- Golfcrest is an unincorporated community at 41°56′34″N 83°22′13″W.
- Loranger is a former settlement within the township. Settled in 1832, it centered around the Loranger gristmill along Stony Creek. The community never really developed but did have its own post office briefly from January 16, 1865 to April 26, 1869. The gristmill was saved and relocated to The Henry Ford in 1928. The Edward Loranger House, which was built in 1825, remains in its original location along Stony Creek.
- Newport is an unincorporated community centered at 42°00′08″N 83°18′31″W mostly in Berlin Township. The Newport 48166 ZIP Code serves the northern portion of Frenchtown Township.
- Pointe aux Peaux is an unincorporated community located near Stony Point along the shores of Lake Erie at 41°56′42″N 83°15′15″W.
- Steiner is an unincorporated community at 41°59′20″N 83°23′15″W. Steiner had its own post office from September 7, 1886 to July 31, 1925.
- Stony Creek is a historic community located along a railway line at 41°57′51″N 83°20′03″W. Stony Creek had its own post office very briefly from July 6, 1840 to January 18, 1841.
- Stony Point is an unincorporated community and census-designated place located at 41°56′28″N 83°15′58″W.
- Woodland Beach is an unincorporated community and census-designated place located at 41°56′32″N 83°19′06″W.

== Geography ==
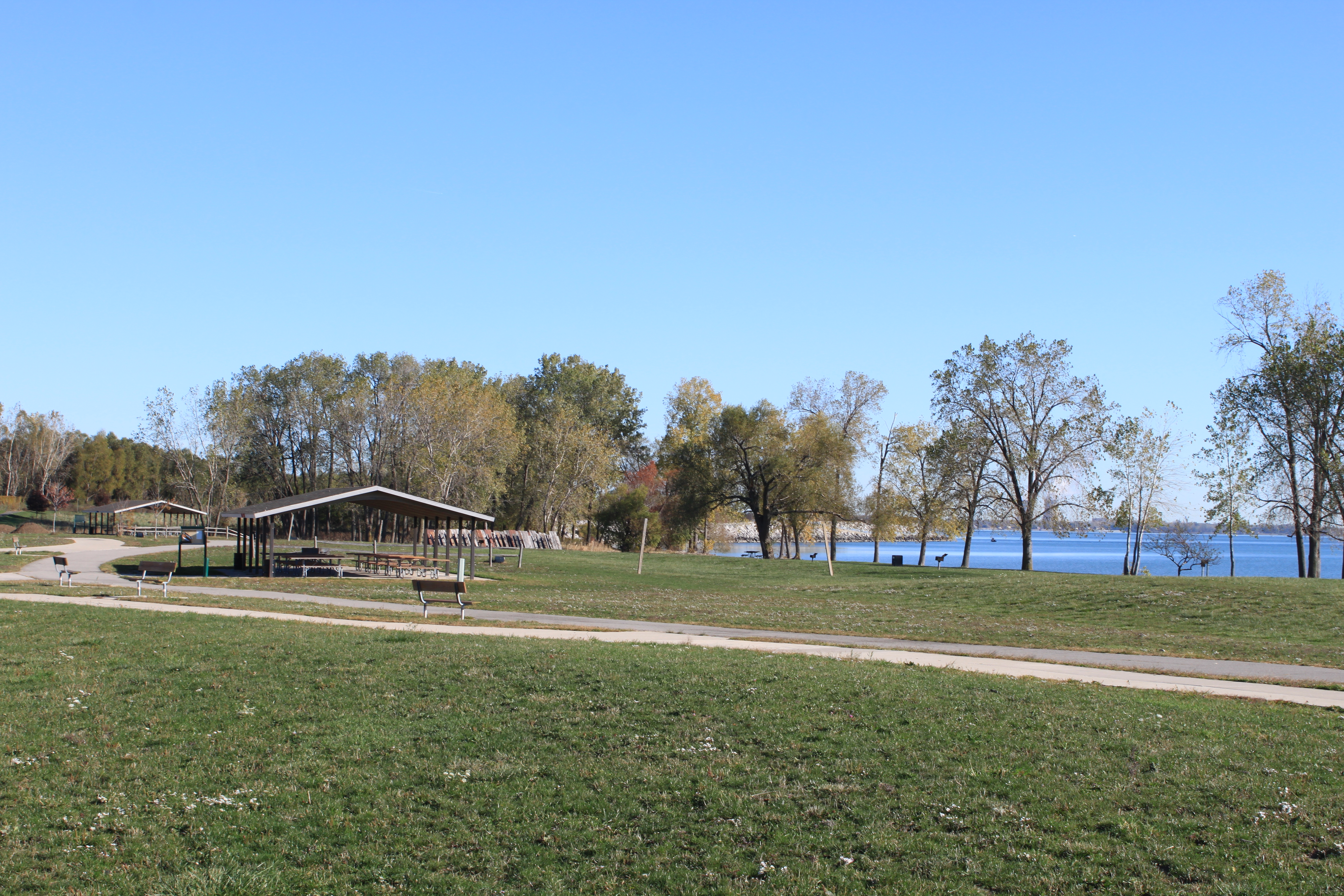
Sterling State Park is mostly located within Frenchtown Township.

The township is in eastern Monroe County and is bordered to the southeast by Lake Erie. Many of the township's communities are located near the lake. Sterling State Park is located along the southern edge of the township and is the only Michigan state park on Lake Erie. Small pieces of the township are organized into the Detroit River International Wildlife Refuge. Frenchtown Township is bordered on the south by the city of Monroe, but a small portion of the southern border touches Monroe Charter Township. Raisinville Township is to the west, and Ash and Berlin Township border on the north. A very small portion of the northwest corner of Frenchtown Township touches Exeter Township. The River Raisin serves as the boundary between Frenchtown and the city of Monroe for a short length near Lake Erie and then again further upstream for a small portion near the Custer Airport. Sandy Creek also runs through the township. The southeast border of Frenchtown Township, as well as the rest of the county's Lake Erie shoreline, is at the lowest elevation in the state of Michigan at 571 feet (174 m) above sea level.

According to the U.S. Census Bureau, the township has a total area of 43.12 square miles (111.68 km^{2}), of which 41.74 square miles (108.11 km^{2}) are land and 1.38 square miles (3.57 km^{2}), or 3.19%, are water.

=== Major highways ===
- I-75 runs northeast-southwest through the center of the township, with access at North Dixie Highway (exit 15) and Nadeau Road (exit 18).
- I-275 has its southern terminus within the township at the boundary with Berlin Township.
- US 24 (North Telegraph Road) runs parallel just west of Interstate 75.
- US 25 is a former highway that ran through the township but was replaced with the present-day U.S. Route 24 and M-125 in the early-1970s.
- M-125 (North Monroe Street) runs through the township before its northern terminus at Telegraph Road.
- M-130 (North Custer Road) is a former highway that runs briefly through the southwestern portion of the township. It was a state highway from 1929 to 1955.
- M-56 (North Dixie Hwy) is a former highway that ran north-south through the township near Lake Erie. It was a state highway decommissioned in 1957.

== Demographics ==
Historical population
Census	Pop.	Note	%±
1850	1,242		—
1860	1,777		43.1%
1870	2,115		19.0%
1880	2,485		17.5%
1890	2,023		−18.6%
1900	1,938		−4.2%
1910	1,770		−8.7%
1920	1,840		4.0%
1930	2,560		39.1%
1940	3,757		46.8%
1950	6,966		85.4%
1960	12,199		75.1%
1970	14,685		20.4%
1980	18,204		24.0%
1990	18,210		0.0%
2000	20,777		14.1%
2010	20,428		−1.7%
2020	21,609		5.8%
U.S. Decennial Census

As per the census of 2010, there were 20,428 people, 7,733 households, and 5,598 families residing in the township. The population density was 493.4 inhabitants per square mile (190.5/km^{2}). There were 8,244 housing units at an average density of 195.8 per square mile (75.6/km^{2}). The racial makeup of the township was 95.51% White, 1.59% African American, 0.41% Native American, 0.53% Asian, 0.01% Pacific Islander, 0.45% from other races, and 1.49% from two or more races. Hispanic or Latino of any race were 2.45% of the population.

There were 7,733 households, out of which 35.9% had children under the age of 18 living with them, 56.1% were married couples living together, 11.0% had a female householder with no husband present, and 27.6% were non-families. 22.4% of all households were made up of individuals, and 8.0% had someone living alone who was 65 years of age or older. The average household size was 2.65 and the average family size was 3.10.

In the township the population was spread out, with 27.5% under the age of 18, 9.4% from 18 to 24, 31.5% from 25 to 44, 21.5% from 45 to 64, and 10.1% who were 65 years of age or older. The median age was 34 years. For every 100 females there were 99.9 males. For every 100 females age 18 and over, there were 95.6 males.

The median income for a household in the township was $47,699, and the median income for a family was $54,032. Males had a median income of $44,338 versus $25,787 for females. The per capita income for the township was $21,335. About 4.9% of families and 7.0% of the population were below the poverty line, including 6.4% of those under age 18 and 8.7% of those age 65 or over.

== Education ==
Frenchtown Township is served by three separate public school districts. The majority of the township is served by Jefferson Schools, which has its middle school and high school within the township, as well as one of its two elementary schools. The northernmost portion of the township is served by Airport Community Schools, while the western portion of the township is served by Monroe Public Schools.

Triumph Academy is a charter school located within the township.

== Images ==
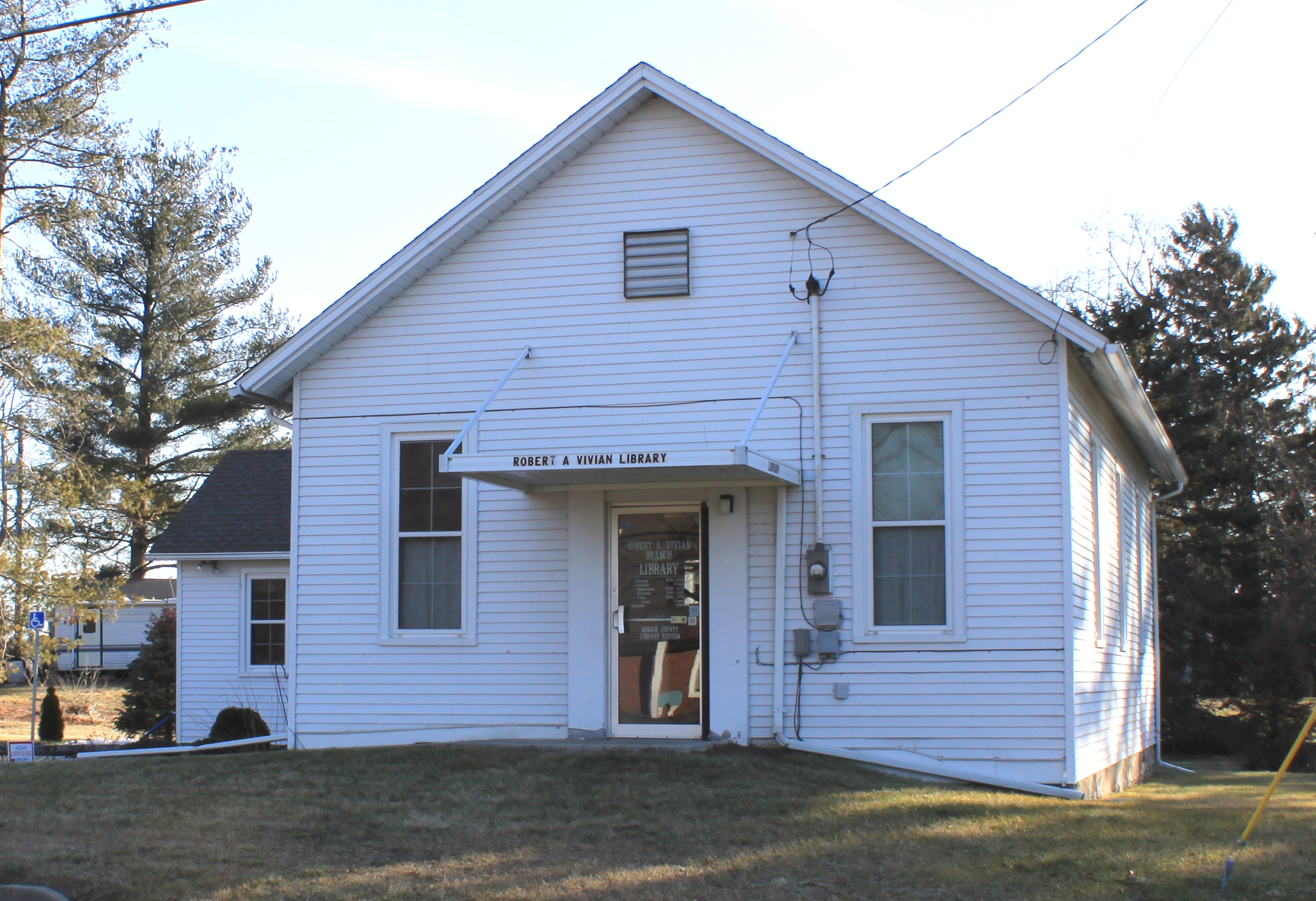
Library and former town hall, built 1910

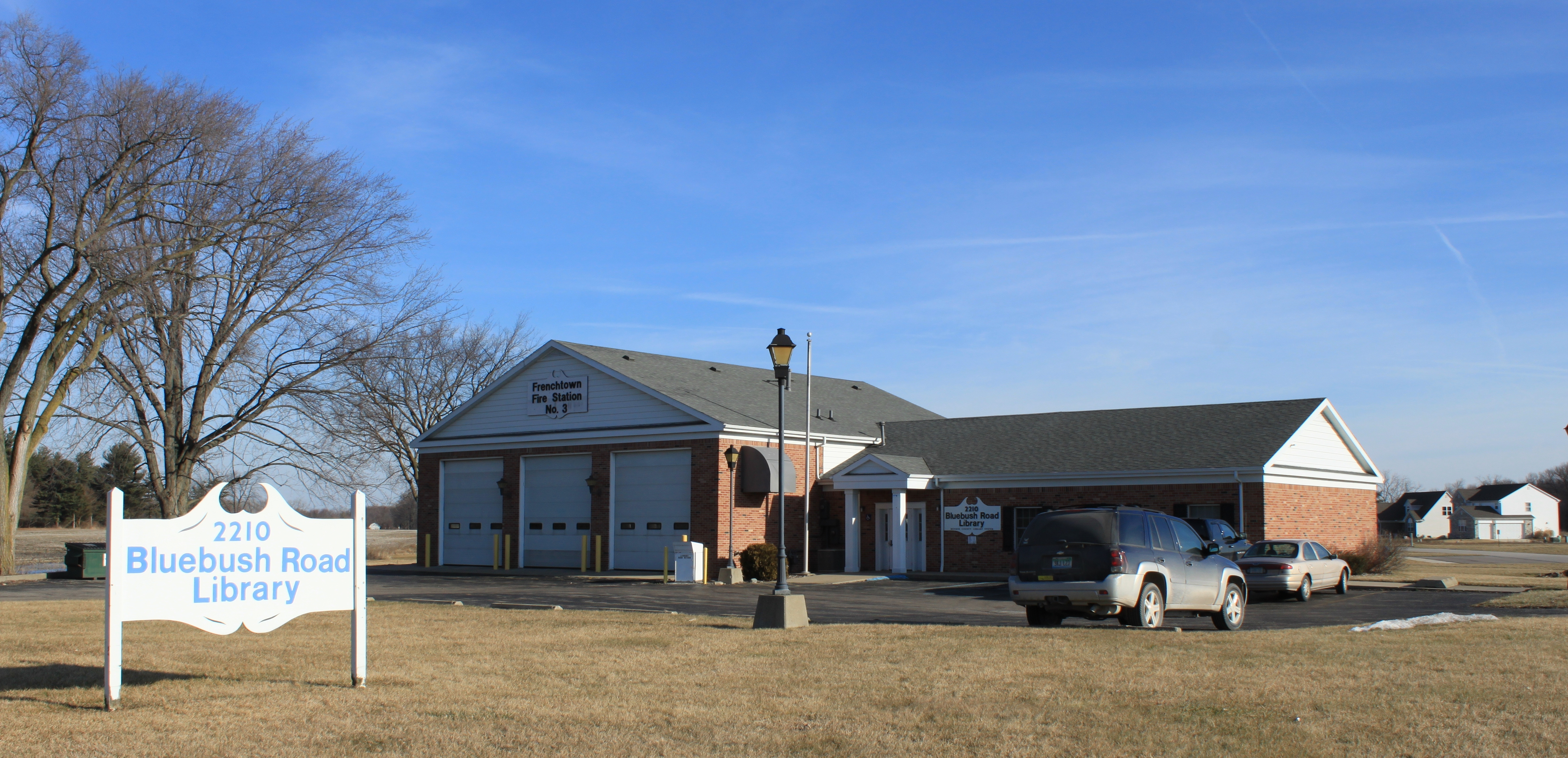
Bluebush Road Library & Fire Station

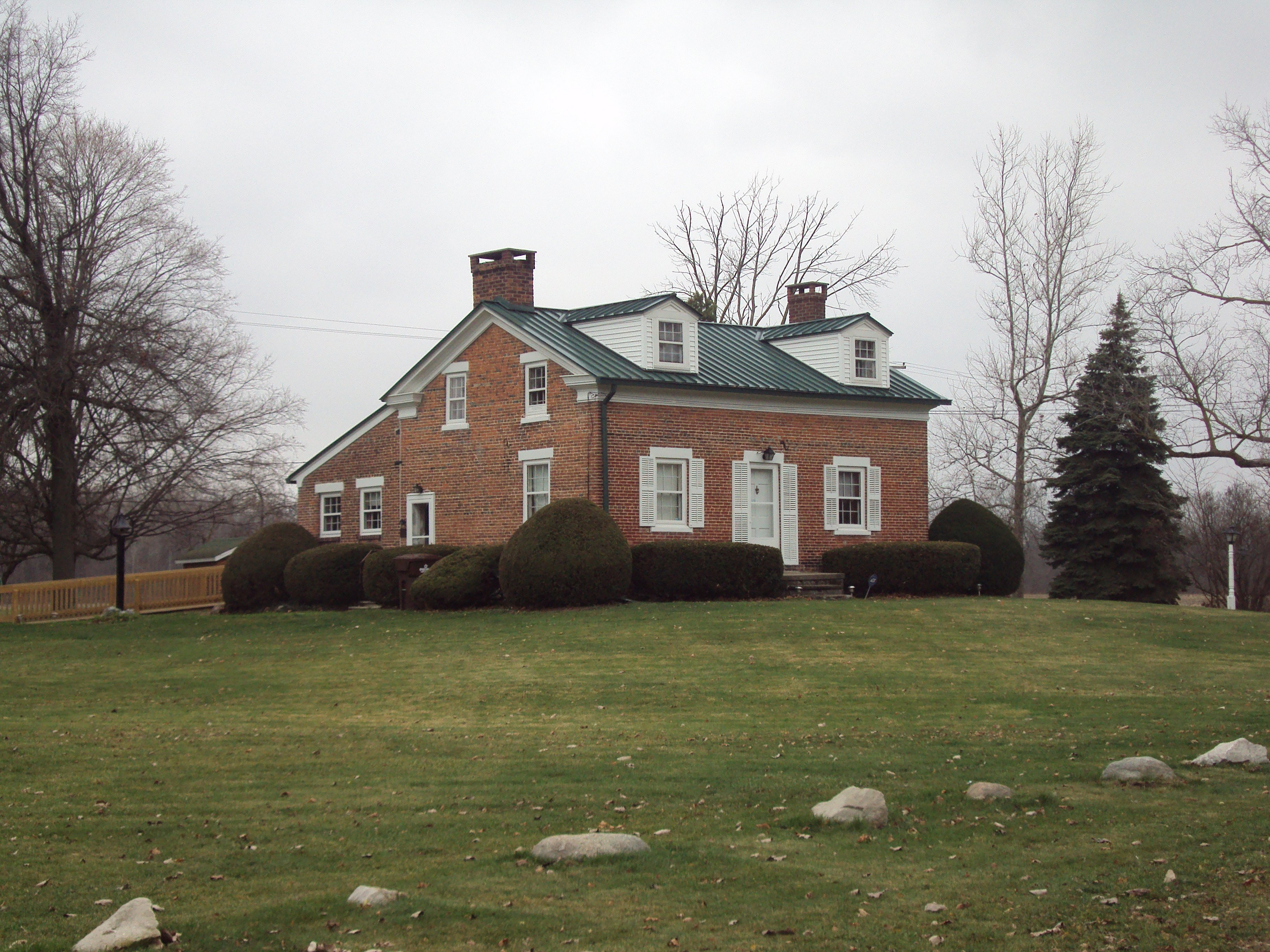
Edward Loranger House

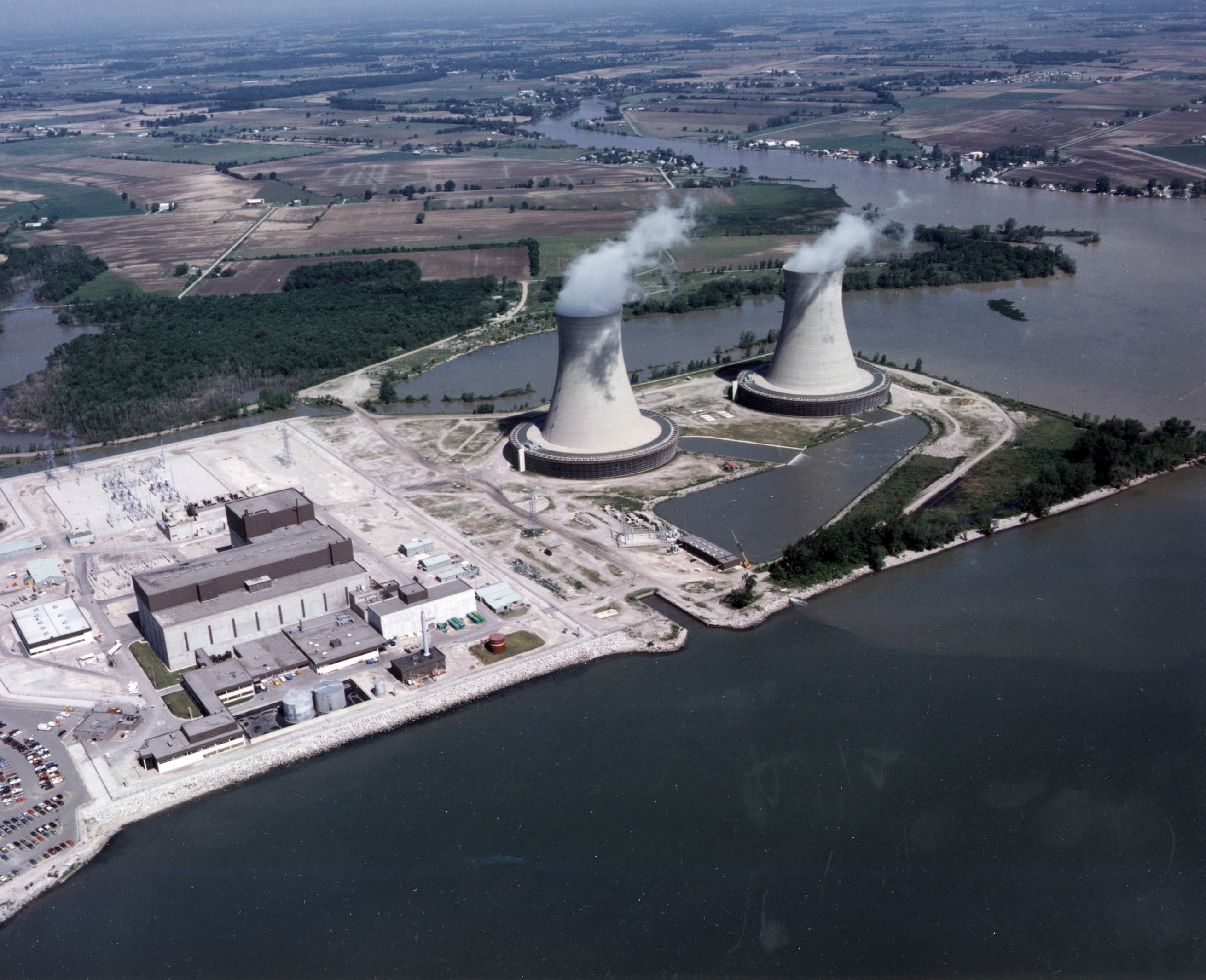
Enrico Fermi Nuclear Generating Station

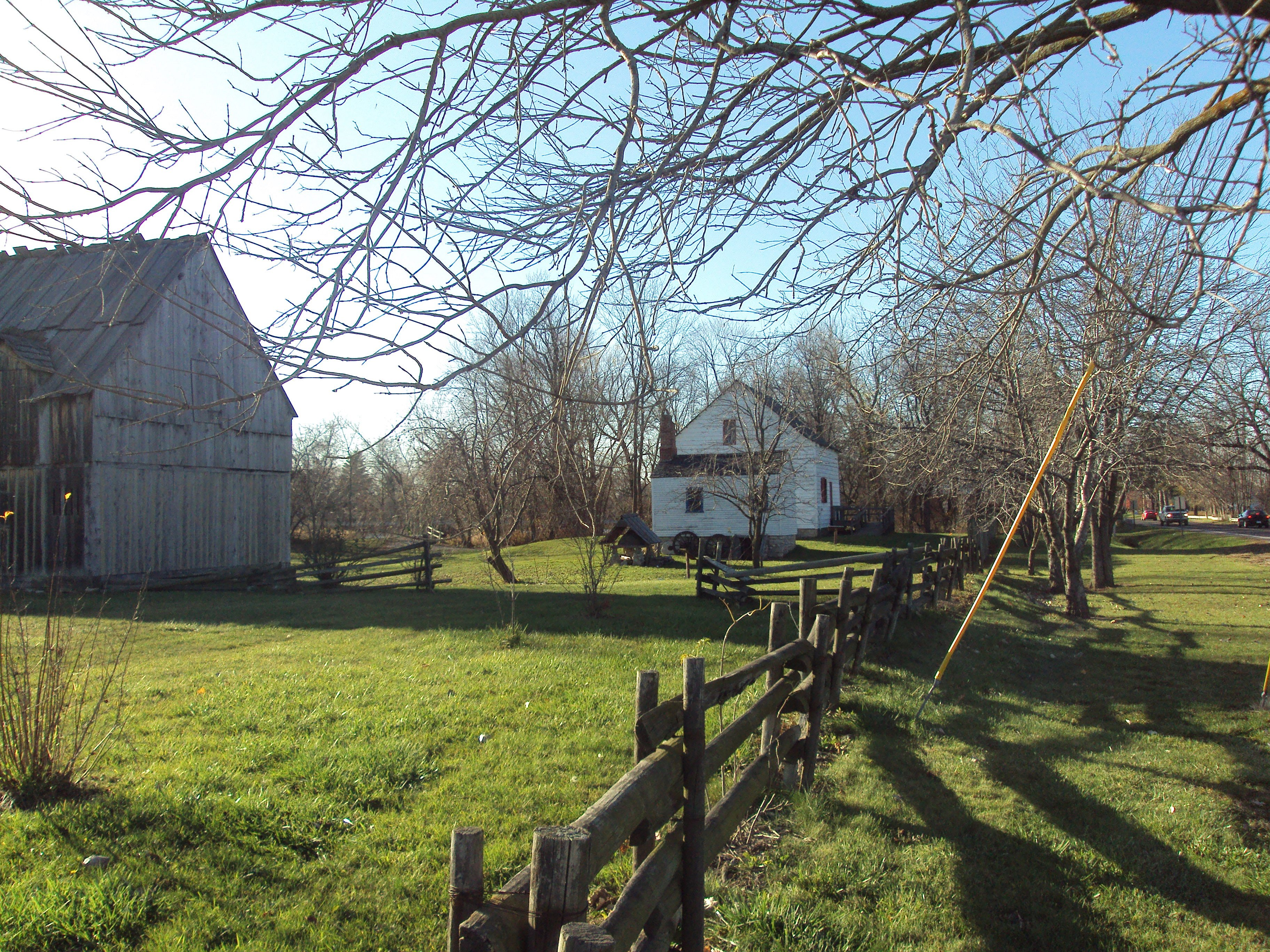
Navarre–Anderson Trading Post

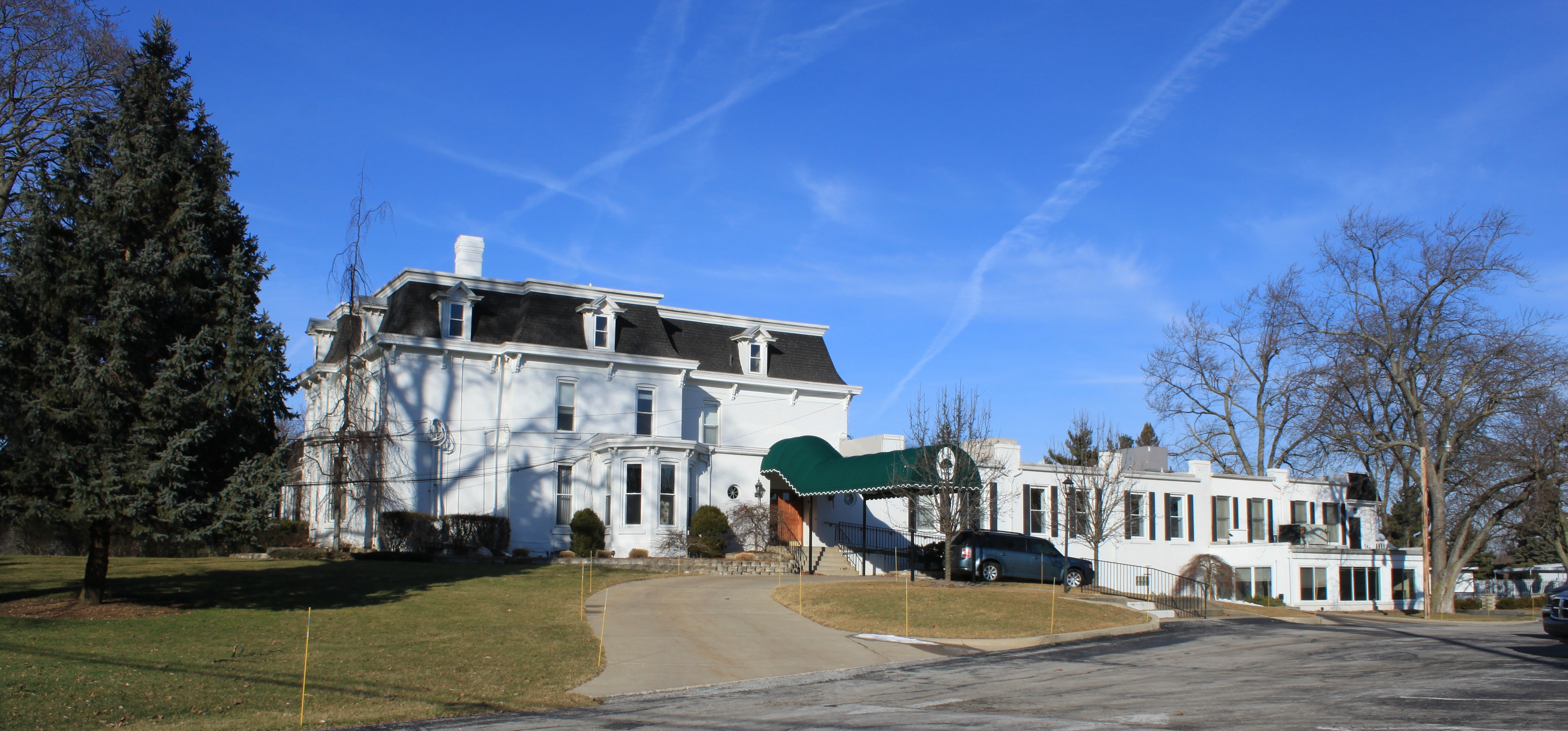
Monroe Golf & Country Club, built 1919
