= Sterling Forest =

Sterling Forest may refer to:

- Sterling Forest, New York, a hamlet in the Town of Warwick, Orange County
- Sterling Forest State Park, in the Ramapo Mountains in Orange County, New York
- Sterling Forest, a poem by Patti Smith from her 1978 book Babel

== See also ==
- Sterling State Park, Michigan
