= Sterling Park =

Sterling Park may refer to several places in the United States:

- Sterling Park, a housing development in Sterling, Virginia
- Sterling State Park in Monroe, Michigan
- Sterling Forest State Park in Orange County, New York
