= Balwa Gujran =

- Village
- Location in Uttar Pradesh, India
- Coordinates: 29.406°N 77.308°E
- Country: India
- State: Uttar Pradesh
- District: Shamli Newly Formed
- Elevation: 244 m (801 ft)

Population (2011)
  - Total: 10,500

Languages
  - Official: Hindi
- Time zone: UTC+5:30 (IST)
- PIN: 247776
- Telephone code: 01398
- Vehicle registration: UP 19
- Sex ratio: 1000:850 ♂/♀

Balwa Gujran is a village in Shamli district in the Indian state of Uttar Pradesh about 85 km from Delhi. Its nearest town is Shamli, about 3 km in distance.

== Overview ==
Balwa Gujran is located on the Shamli–Saharanpur SH-57 highway. It is around 85 km from Delhi, 36 km from Panipat, and 65 km from both Meerut and Saharanpur. The nearest town is Shamli at a distance of 3 km. Balwa Gujran comes in Shamli Block and under Shamli Tahshil. Modern facilities for the education conscious community include a girls' junior high school and other government and private schools. Transportation is made available through RCC roads, a railway station, and bus service.

== History ==
Balwa Gujran was founded by the Ranas (Chauhan Gurjars) of Ranthambore and still dominated by Rana Gurjars. Balwah village of Chauhan Gurjars still exists in Ranthambore region. Balwa Gujran is a part of Kalsana Khap of Chauhan Gurjars. Khap has more than 84 villages in District Shamli.

== Geography ==
Balwa Gujran is located at 29.406°N 77.308°E. It has an average elevation of 244 metres (801 ft).

== Demographics ==
Provisional data from the 2011 census shows that Balwa Gujran has a population of 10,500. The sex ratio is about 850.
