= Route 56 (disambiguation) =

Route 56 may refer to:

- Route 56 (MTA Maryland), in Baltimore, Maryland, U.S.
- London Buses route 56, in England
- SEPTA Route 56, in Philadelphia, U.S.

== See also ==
- List of highways numbered 56
