= Route 57 (disambiguation) =

Route 57 is a name of roads and highways in many countries.

Route 57 may also refer to:

- Route 57 (MTA Maryland), a bus route in metropolitan Baltimore, Maryland, U.S.
- Route 57 (MBTA), a bus route in Massachusetts, US
- London Buses route 57, England
- Melbourne tram route 57, Australia
- National Cycle Route 57, of the National Cycle Network, England
- Route 57 (magazine), an English online literary magazine
