= List of highways numbered 56 =

The following highways are numbered 56:

== International ==
- E56 European route E56

== Australia ==
- Oxley Highway

== Canada ==
- Alberta Highway 56
- Saskatchewan Highway 56

== China ==
- G56 Expressway

== Czech Republic ==
- D56 motorway

== Greece ==
- EO56 road

== India ==
- National Highway 56 (India)

== Iran ==
- Road 56

== Italy ==
- Autostrada A56

== Japan ==
- Japan National Route 56

== Korea, South ==
- National Route 56
- Gukjido 56

== New Zealand ==
- New Zealand State Highway 56

== Philippines ==
- N56 highway (Philippines)

== United Kingdom ==
- British A56 (Chester-Broughton)
- British M56 (Cheadle-Mollington)

== United States ==
- Interstate 56 (former proposal)
- U.S. Route 56
- Alabama State Route 56
  - County Route 56 (Lee County, Alabama)
- Arkansas Highway 56
- California State Route 56
- Colorado State Highway 56
- Florida State Road 56
- Georgia State Route 56
- Hawaii Route 56
- Illinois Route 56
- Indiana State Road 56
- Iowa Highway 56
- Kentucky Route 56
- Louisiana Highway 56
  - Louisiana State Route 56 (former)
- Maryland Route 56
- Massachusetts Route 56
- Michigan:
  - M-56 (1919–1957 Michigan highway) (former)
  - M-56 (1971–1987 Michigan highway) (former)
- Minnesota State Highway 56
  - County Route 56 (Aitkin County, Minnesota)
  - County Route 56 (Anoka County, Minnesota)
  - County Route 56 (Beltrami County, Minnesota)
  - County Road 56 (Chisago County, Minnesota)
  - County Road 56 (Dakota County, Minnesota)
  - County Road 56 (St. Louis County, Minnesota)
- Missouri Route 56 (former)
- Montana Highway 56
- Nebraska Highway 56
  - Nebraska Link 56C
  - Nebraska Link 56D
  - Nebraska Link 56G
  - Nebraska Recreation Road 56E
  - Nebraska Recreation Road 56F
- Nevada State Route 56
- New Jersey Route 56
  - County Route 56 (Bergen County, New Jersey)
  - County Route 56 (Monmouth County, New Jersey)
- New York State Route 56
  - County Route 56 (Dutchess County, New York)
  - County Route 56 (Essex County, New York)
  - County Route 56 (Jefferson County, New York)
  - County Route 56 (Niagara County, New York)
  - County Route 56 (Oneida County, New York)
  - County Route 56 (Onondaga County, New York)
  - County Route 56 (Oswego County, New York)
  - County Route 56 (Putnam County, New York)
  - County Route 56 (Rensselaer County, New York)
  - County Route 56 (Saratoga County, New York)
  - County Route 56 (Suffolk County, New York)
- North Carolina Highway 56
- North Dakota Highway 56
- Ohio State Route 56
- Oklahoma State Highway 56
  - Oklahoma State Highway 56 Loop
- Pennsylvania Route 56
- South Carolina Highway 56
- Tennessee State Route 56
- Texas State Highway 56
  - Texas State Highway Spur 56
  - Farm to Market Road 56 (Texas)
  - Texas Park Road 56
- Utah State Route 56
- Vermont Route 56 (former)
- Virginia State Route 56
- West Virginia:
  - West Virginia Route 56 (1920s) (former)
  - West Virginia Route 56 (1930s) (former)
- Wisconsin Highway 56

== See also ==
- List of highways numbered 56A
- A56

Preceded by 55	Lists of highways 56	Succeeded by 57
