= Detroit Beach, Michigan =

- Census-designated place (CDP) & Unincorporated community
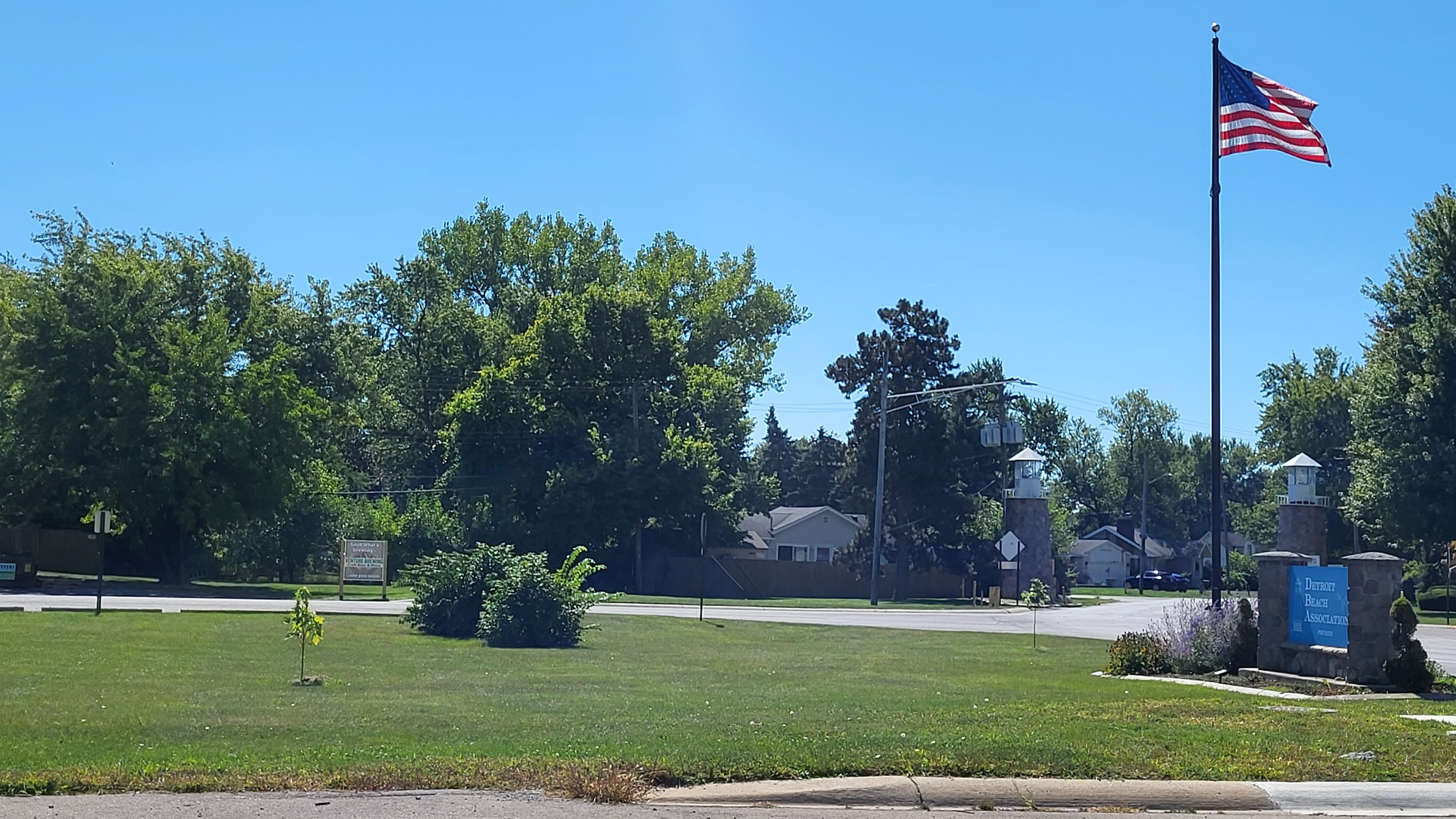
- Entranceway along Grand Boulevard
- Interactive map of Detroit Beach, Michigan
- Location within the state of Michigan Location within the United States
- Coordinates: 41°55′52″N 83°19′37″W
- Country: United States
- State: Michigan
- County: Monroe
- Township: Frenchtown
- Established: 1923

Area
  - Total: 0.662 sq mi (1.715 km^{2})
  - Land: 0.624 sq mi (1.616 km^{2})
  - Water: 0.038 sq mi (0.099 km^{2}) 5.74%
- Elevation: 574 ft (175 m)

Population (2020)
  - Total: 1,957
  - Density: 3,136.22/sq mi (1,210.90/km^{2})
- Time zone: UTC–5 (Eastern (EST))
  - Summer (DST): UTC–4 (EDT)
- ZIP code(s): 48162 (Monroe)
- Area code: 734
- GNIS feature ID: 624581, 2393395

Detroit Beach is a census-designated place (CDP) and unincorporated community in Monroe County, Michigan, United States. The population was 1,957 as of the 2020 census, As an unincorporated community, Detroit Beach has no legal autonomy of its own. The CDP is located within Frenchtown Charter Township along the shores of Lake Erie.

== History ==
The community of Detroit Beach was established by the Industrial Development Company in 1923 and so named in order to attract lot buyers from Detroit.

== Geography ==
According to the United States Census Bureau, the CDP has an area of 0.662 square miles (1.71 km^{2}), of which 0.624 square miles (1.62 km^{2}) is land and 0.038 square miles (0.10 km^{2}) (5.74%) is water.

The community is in Frenchtown Charter Township on the shores of Lake Erie about 3.0 miles (4.8 km) northeast of the city of Monroe. The area defined by the CDP is bounded on the northeast by South Grove Drive, on the northwest by North Dixie Highway, and on the southwest by the Sandy Creek and Sterling State Park. Detroit Beach is the main community, but the CDP also extends to include residents and storefronts along North Dixie Highway, as well as the Frenchtown Harbor condominiums and a small portion of Grand Beach. The CDP of Woodland Beach borders to the northeast.

== Demographics ==
Historical population
| Census | Pop. | Note | %± |
|---|---|---|---|
| 1980 | 2,112 | | — |
| 1990 | 2,113 | | 0.0% |
| 2000 | 2,289 | | 8.3% |
| 2010 | 2,087 | | −8.8% |
| 2020 | 1,957 | | −6.2% |
U.S. Decennial Census; 2020 Census

Detroit Beach, Michigan – racial and ethnic composition Note: the US Census treats Hispanic/Latino as an ethnic category. This table excludes Latinos from the racial categories and assigns them to a separate category. Hispanics/Latinos may be of any race.
| Race / ethnicity (NH = non-Hispanic) | Pop. 1990 | Pop. 2000 | Pop. 2010 | Pop. 2020 | % 1990 | % 2000 | % 2010 | % 2020 |
|---|---|---|---|---|---|---|---|---|
| White alone (NH) | 2,094 | 2,231 | 1,971 | 1,776 | 99.10% | 97.47% | 94.44% | 90.75% |
| Black or African American alone (NH) | 0 | 3 | 7 | 21 | 0.00% | 0.13% | 0.34% | 1.07% |
| Native American or Alaska Native alone (NH) | 7 | 7 | 5 | 15 | 0.33% | 0.31% | 0.24% | 0.77% |
| Asian alone (NH) | 0 | 1 | 1 | 4 | 0.00% | 0.04% | 0.05% | 0.20% |
| Pacific Islander alone (NH) | 0 | 0 | 0 | 0 | 0.00% | 0.00% | 0.00% | 0.00% |
| Other race alone (NH) | 0 | 1 | 1 | 10 | 0.00% | 0.04% | 0.05% | 0.51% |
| Mixed race or multiracial (NH) | 0 | 24 | 41 | 70 | 0.00% | 1.05% | 1.96% | 3.58% |
| Hispanic or Latino (any race) | 12 | 22 | 61 | 61 | 0.57% | 0.96% | 2.92% | 3.12% |
| Total | 2,113 | 2,289 | 2,087 | 1,957 | 100.00% | 100.00% | 100.00% | 100.00% |

=== 2020 census ===
As of the 2020 census, there were 1,957 people, 776 households, and 559 families residing in the CDP. The population density was 3,146.30 inhabitants per square mile (1,214.79/km^{2}). There were 855 housing units at an average density of 1,374.60 per square mile (530.74/km^{2}). The racial makeup of the CDP was 91.47% White, 1.07% African American, 0.87% Native American, 0.20% Asian, 0.00% Pacific Islander, 1.23% from some other races and 5.16% from two or more races. Hispanic or Latino people of any race were 3.12% of the population.

=== 2010 census ===
As of the 2010 census, there were 2,087 people, 765 households, and 563 families residing in the CDP. The population density was 3,355.31 inhabitants per square mile (1,295.49/km^{2}). There were 853 housing units at an average density of 1,371.38 per square mile (529.49/km^{2}). The racial makeup of the CDP was 95.88% White, 0.38% African American, 0.24% Native American, 0.05% Asian, 0.00% Pacific Islander, 0.67% from some other races and 2.78% from two or more races. Hispanic or Latino people of any race were 2.92% of the population.

=== 2000 census ===
As of the 2000 census, there were 2,289 people, 791 households, and 620 families residing in the CDP. The population density was 3,643.12 inhabitants per square mile (1,406.62/km^{2}). There were 820 housing units at an average density of 1,305.09 per square mile (503.90/km^{2}). The racial makeup of the CDP was 98.08% White, 0.13% African American, 0.31% Native American, 0.04% Asian, 0.00% Pacific Islander, 0.09% from some other races and 1.35% from two or more races. Hispanic or Latino people of any race were 0.96% of the population.

There were 791 households, out of which 38.8% had children under the age of 18 living with them, 60.2% were married couples living together, 12.3% had a female householder with no husband present, and 21.5% were non-families. 16.4% of all households were made up of individuals, and 4.9% had someone living alone who was 65 years of age or older. The average household size was 2.88 and the average family size was 3.23.

In the community, the population was spread out, with 28.6% under the age of 18, 8.6% from 18 to 24, 34.0% from 25 to 44, 21.2% from 45 to 64, and 7.7% who were 65 years of age or older. The median age was 34 years. For every 100 females, there were 102.2 males. For every 100 females age 18 and over, there were 100.6 males.

The median income for a household in the community was $56,528, and the median income for a family was $58,393. Males had a median income of $47,333 versus $30,000 for females. The per capita income for the community was $21,025. About 2.7% of families and 3.9% of the population were below the poverty line, including none of those under age 18 and 8.0% of those age 65 or over.

== Education ==
Detroit Beach and its surrounding communities are served by Jefferson Schools.
