= List of highways numbered 56A =

The following highways are numbered 56A:

== United States ==
- Nebraska Spur 56A
- New York State Route 56A (former)

== See also ==
- List of highways numbered 56
