= Edward Loranger House =

Historic house in Michigan, United States

- U.S. National Register of Historic Places
- Michigan State Historic Site
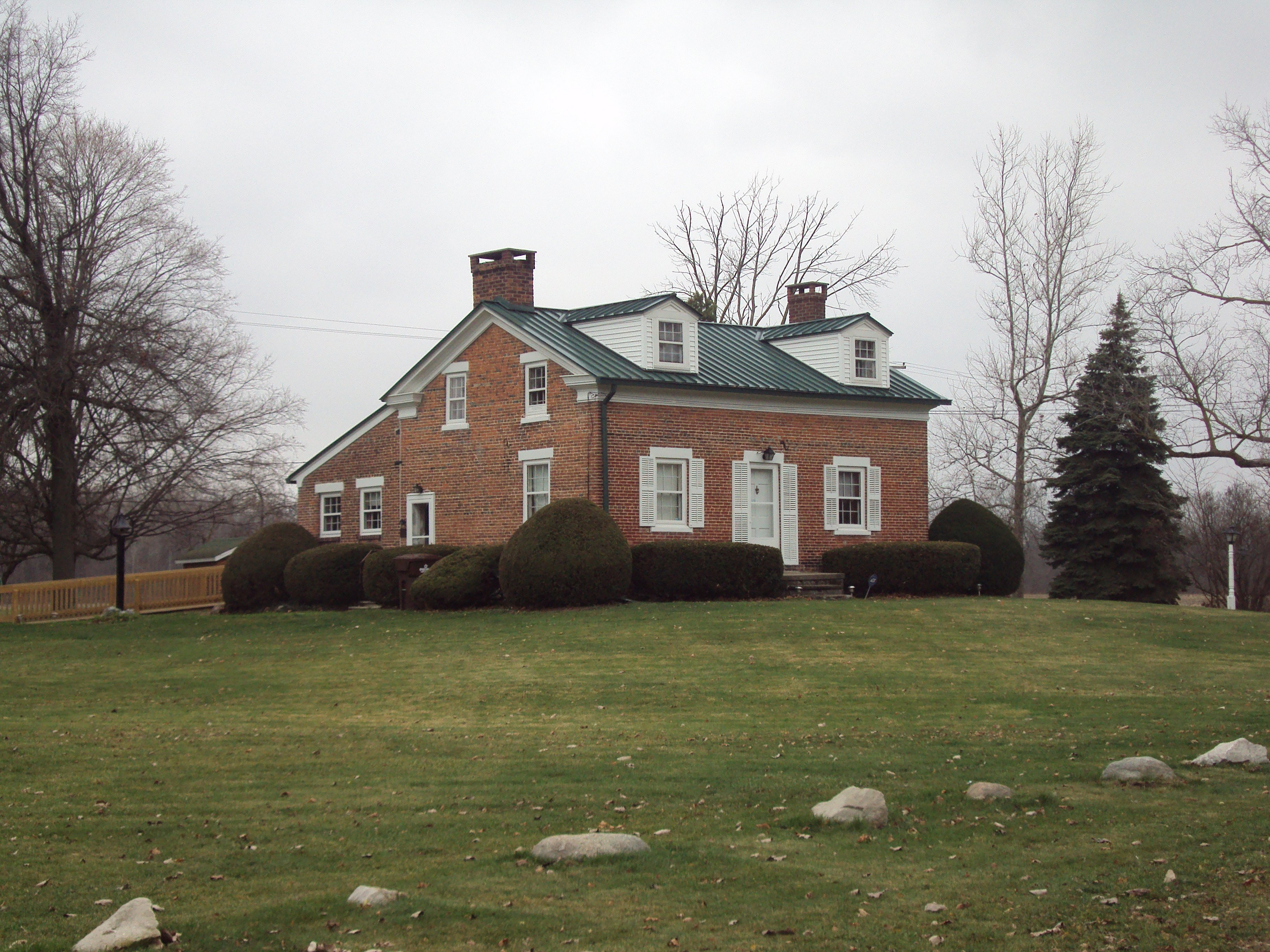

- Location within Michigan Location within the United States
- Interactive map
- Location: 7211 S. Stoney Creek Road; Frenchtown Charter Township, Michigan
- Coordinates: 41°55′54″N 83°22′22″W
- Built: 1825
- Architect: Edward Loranger
- NRHP reference No.: 84001807

Significant dates
- Added to NRHP: May 31, 1984
- Designated MSHS: October 2, 1980

The Edward Loranger House is a private residence located at 7211 South Stoney Creek Road in Frenchtown Charter Township in Monroe County, Michigan. It was listed as a Michigan Historic Site on October 2, 1980 and added to the National Register of Historic Places on May 31, 1984. The house is significant as one of the oldest authentic structures in Michigan — having undergone very little modifications since it was first built.

== History ==
Edward Loranger was born in Trois-Rivières, Canada in 1796. He moved to Michigan in 1816, and in 1822 purchased the land on which this house is now located. He became one of the most prominent landowners and architects in early Monroe County, and constructed many buildings in the area. This house was built in 1825. Loranger married Marianne Navarre In 1826, and the couple had five children. Loranger died in 1887.

The house fell into disrepair over the years but was restored in 1941. It was during this restoration that the dormers were added to the roof. The house remains privately owned.

== Description ==
The Edward Loranger House is a 1½ story, red brick gabled farmhouse on the banks of Stoney Creek about five miles (8 km) north of Monroe and three miles (4.8 km) south of the village of Carleton. The house is a fairly simple and common French-Canadian-style house with no exterior decor. A single-story addition, constructed in 1861, is connected to the rear.

The house is rectangular, and symmetrical in plan, with a center entrance with windows on each side; the windows are six-over-six double hing units, and have stone lintels and sills. A chimney is located at each gable end. It sits on a stone foundation.

The house originally had two rooms and an attic inside. The wall separating the two rooms constructed of brique en poteaux, meaning brick placed between vertical posts. This was an early French-Canadian construction technique. There are two more rooms in the 1861 addition.

The property also includes five outbuildings - a brick smokehouse, a barn, a playhouse, and two storage buildings. Loranger also constructed a gristmill and sawmill on his property. These have since been moved to The Henry Ford.
