= Sandy Creek (Michigan) =

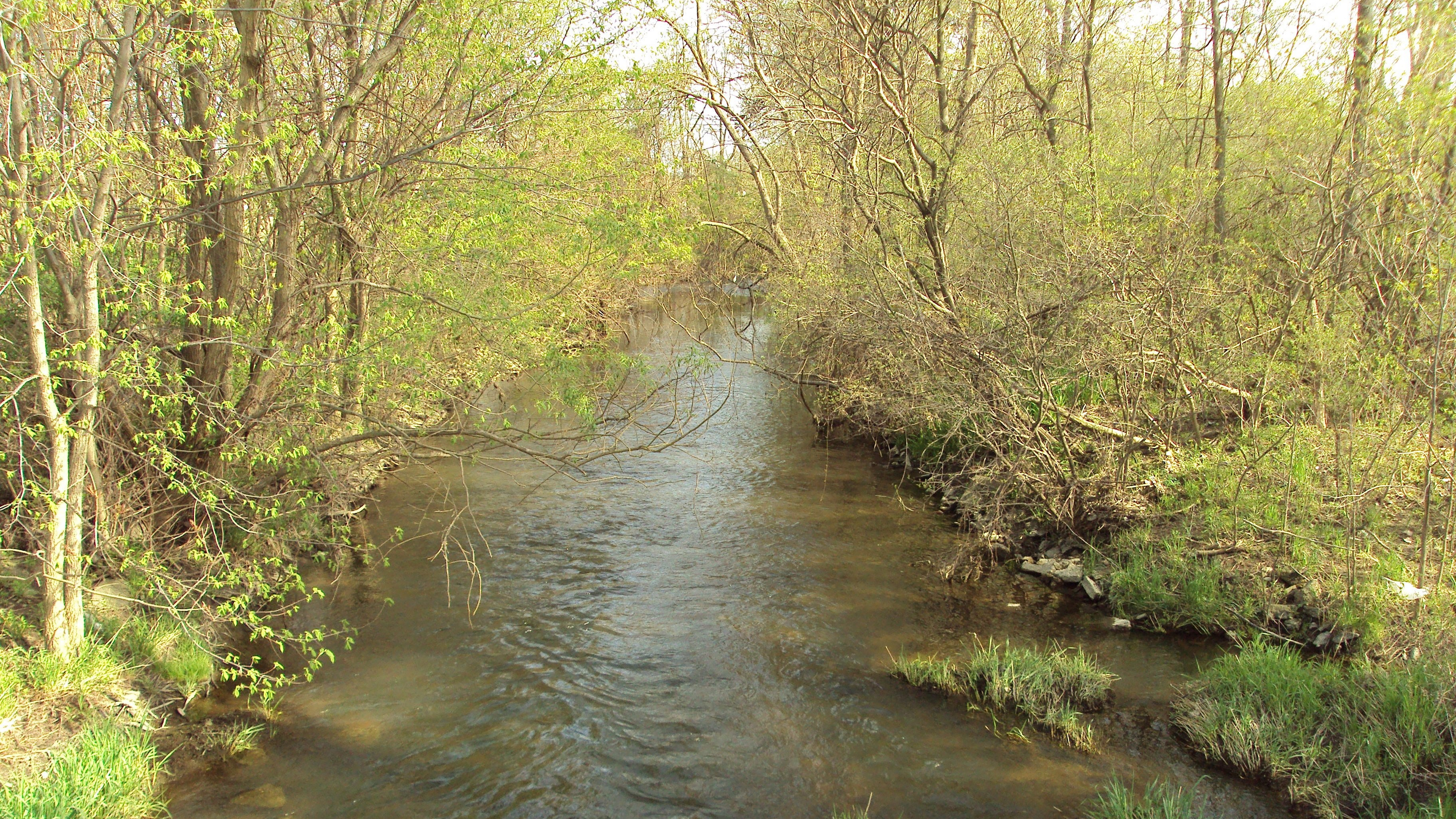
- View from Dixie Highway in Frenchtown Township

- Location within the state of Michigan

Location
- Country: United States
- State: Michigan
- County: Monroe

Physical characteristics
- Source
  - location: London Township
  - coordinates: 42°01′48″N 83°35′31″W
  - elevation: 663 ft (202 m)
- Mouth: Lake Erie
  - location: Frenchtown Charter Township
  - coordinates: 41°55′30″N 83°20′02″W
  - elevation: 571 ft (174 m)
- Length: 18.5 mi (29.8 km)
- Discharge
  - location: Lake Erie

Basin features
- Tributaries
  - right: Little Sandy Creek

Sandy Creek is an 18.5-mile-long (29.8 km) creek entirely in Monroe County in the U.S. state of Michigan. The creek rises in London Township in the north-central portion of the county and flows southeast into Lake Erie in Frenchtown Charter Township at Sterling State Park.

One of the earliest French settlements in the area, known as the Sandy Creek Settlement is along the banks of Sandy Creek. It existed from about 1780–1813 and was abandoned after the Battle of Frenchtown during the War of 1812.

== Geography ==
A narrow and shallow creek, Sandy Creek does not have a dam and is not navigable. However, the creek's watershed serves an important purpose of flood prevention in the area, which has a relatively flat topography and heavy agricultural use. There was a $1.2 million clearcutting project in 2019 along most of the creek to increase its drainage and alleviate flooding along its route. Sandy Creek's watershed includes portions of Frenchtown Charter Township, Raisinville Township, Exeter Township (including the village of Maybee), London Township, Dundee Township, and the city of Monroe.

The creek flows for 18.5 miles (29.8 km) from London Township to Lake Erie in Frenchtown Charter Township. Sterling State Park is to the south of the river mouth, while the unincorporated community of Detroit Beach is to the north. Stone embankments and a pump station were built along the banks of Detroit Beach to decrease flooding from Sandy Creek and potentially rising waters from Lake Erie.

Its only sizable tributary, Little Sandy Creek, flows parallel to the main branch about one mile to the south. Sandy Creek travels under Interstate 75, U.S. Route 24 (North Telegraph Road), and North Monroe Street (M-125).

The creek has no large fish populations and most fish are in the artificially enlarged lagoons of Sterling State Park leading to Lake Erie. Common fish in the area include perch, walleye, crappie, channel and bullhead catfish, largemouth and white bass, carp, northern pike, and bluegill.

== Sandy Creek Settlement ==
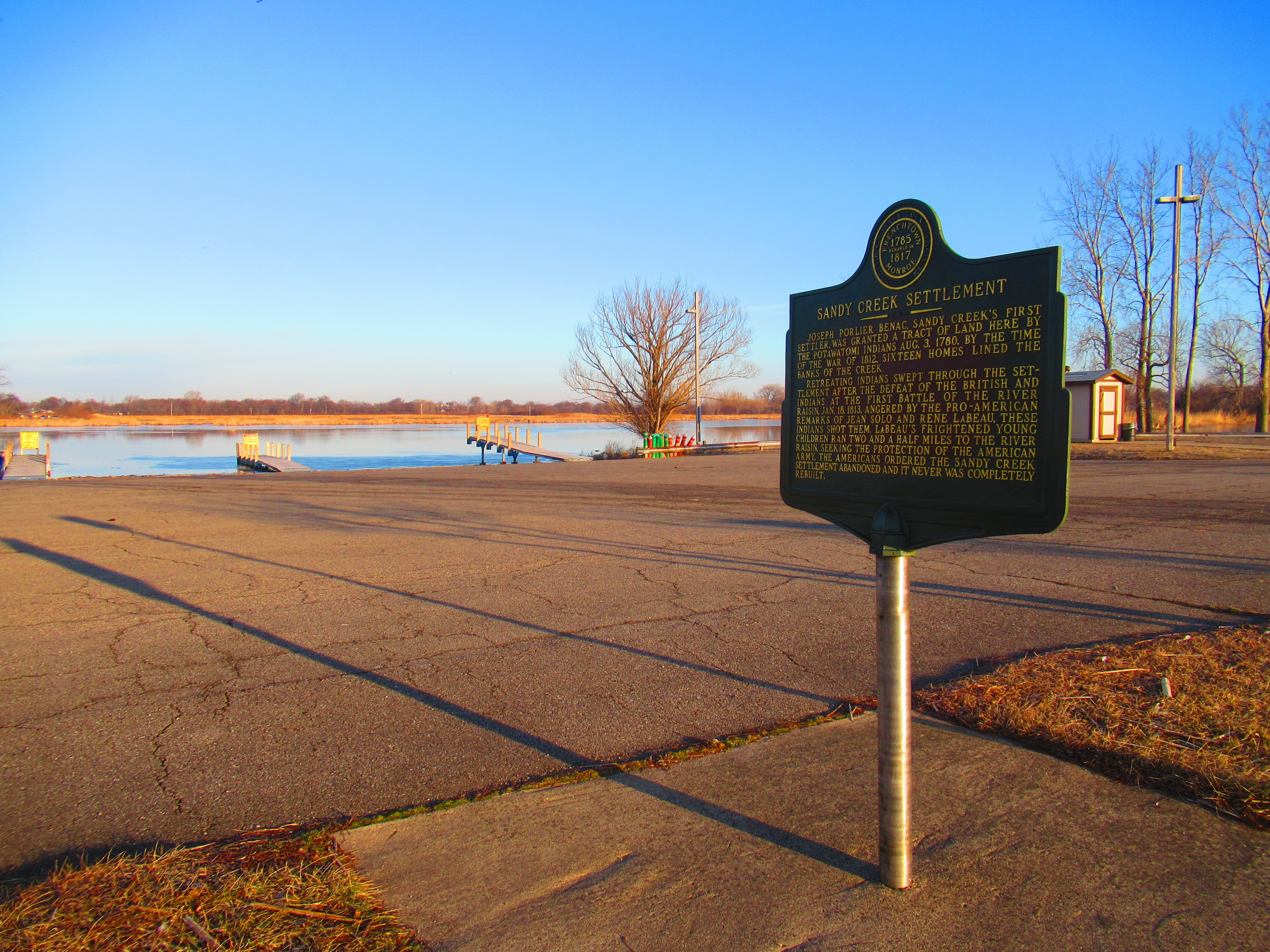
Sandy Creek Settlement historic marker in Sterling State Park

Along the banks of Sandy Creek near Lake Erie was one of the earliest European settlements in the area, known as the Sandy Creek Settlement. The small settlement was founded as early as 1780 by the French shortly before the much larger Frenchtown settlement, which was founded in 1784 just south near the River Raisin. At the time, the area was under the administration of the British Province of Quebec and predated American territorial control. In 1787, the area became part of the newly established American Northwest Territory, then briefly into the Indiana Territory in 1800, and finally into the Michigan Territory in 1805.

The Sandy Creek Settlement was a small area of land given to the early French settlers by the indigenous Potawatomi tribe, which occupied the area beforehand. The small settlement of Sandy Creek, which grew to only a few dozen inhabitants, was abandoned in 1813 after the American's suffered a catastrophic defeat at the Battle of Frenchtown during the War of 1812. During the battle, the Sandy Creek Settlement was abandoned and never resettled.

While parts of Frenchtown later became incorporated into the city of Monroe, there are no remaining traces of the Sandy Creek Settlement. The Sandy Creek Settlement is listed as part of the River Raisin Heritage Corridor as a contributing element of the River Raisin National Battlefield Park. The settlement's history is detailed on a historic marker erected by the Monroe County Historical Commission near the boat launch in Sterling State Park. The historic marker reads:

Joseph Porlier Benec, Sandy Creek's first settler, was granted a tract of land here by the Pottawatomie Indians, August 3, 1780. By the time of the War of 1812, sixteen homes lined the banks of the creek. Retreating Indians swept through the settlement after the defeat of the British and Indians at the first Battle of the River Raisin, January 18, 1813. Angered by the pro-American remarks of Jean Solo and Rene LaBeau, these Indians shot them. LaBeau's frightened young children ran two and a half miles to the River Raisin, seeking the protection of the American Army. The Americans ordered the Sandy Creek settlement abandoned and it never completely rebuilt.
