= A56 =

A56 or A-56 may refer to:

== Roads ==
- A56 road, a road connecting Chester and Broughton in England
- A56 autoroute, a motorway in France
- A56 motorway (Italy), a road connecting Capodichino and Arco Felice in Italy
- A56 highway (Spain), a proposed road to connect Ourense and Lugo in Spain
- Bundesautobahn 56, a formerly proposed road to connect Waldfeucht and Waldbröl in Germany

== Other ==
- Samsung Galaxy A56 5G, a mid-range Android-based smartphone
- Benoni Defense, a group of chess openings generally characterized by the opening moves 1.d4 c5 2.d5
