= List of highways numbered 57 =

The following highways are numbered 57:

== Canada ==
- Alberta Highway 57 (defunct)
- Manitoba Highway 57
- Saskatchewan Highway 57

== Czech Republic ==
- I/57 Highway; Czech: Silnice I/57

== Greece ==
- EO57 road

== India ==
- National Highway 57 (India)

== Mexico ==
- Mexican Federal Highway 57

== Israel ==
- Highway 57 (Israel)

== Italy ==
- Autostrada A57
- Strada statale 57 del Vipacco e dell'Idria

== Japan ==
- Japan National Route 57

== Korea, South ==
- Gukjido 57

== New Zealand ==
- New Zealand State Highway 57

== Philippines ==
- N57 highway (Philippines)

== United Kingdom ==
- British A57 (Liverpool-Lincoln)
- British M57 (Liverpool)

== United States ==
- Interstate 57
- U.S. Route 57
- Alabama State Route 57
  - County Route 57 (Lee County, Alabama)
- Arkansas Highway 57
- California State Route 57
- Colorado State Highway 57
- Connecticut Route 57
- Florida State Road 57
- Georgia State Route 57
- Idaho State Highway 57
- Illinois Route 57
- Indiana State Road 57
- Iowa Highway 57
- K-57 (Kansas highway)
- Kentucky Route 57
- Louisiana Highway 57
  - Louisiana State Route 57 (former)
- Maryland Route 57
- Massachusetts Route 57
- M-57 (Michigan highway)
- Minnesota State Highway 57
- Mississippi Highway 57
- Missouri Route 57 (1922) (former)
- Nebraska Highway 57
  - Nebraska Spur 57A
- Nevada State Route 57 (former)
- New Jersey Route 57
  - County Route 57 (Bergen County, New Jersey)
  - County Route 57 (Monmouth County, New Jersey)
- New Mexico State Road 57
- New York State Route 57 (former)
  - County Route 57 (Cattaraugus County, New York)
  - County Route 57 (Chautauqua County, New York)
  - County Route 57 (Clinton County, New York)
  - County Route 57 (Dutchess County, New York)
  - County Route 57 (Erie County, New York)
  - County Route 57 (Jefferson County, New York)
  - County Route 57 (Montgomery County, New York)
  - County Route 57 (Niagara County, New York)
  - County Route 57 (Onondaga County, New York)
  - County Route 57A (Orleans County, New York)
  - County Route 57 (Oswego County, New York)
    - County Route 57A (Oswego County, New York)
  - County Route 57 (Otsego County, New York)
  - County Route 57 (Putnam County, New York)
  - County Route 57 (Schoharie County, New York)
  - County Route 57 (Suffolk County, New York)
    - County Route 57A (Suffolk County, New York)
    - County Route 57B (Suffolk County, New York)
  - County Route 57 (Wyoming County, New York)
- North Carolina Highway 57
- North Dakota Highway 57
- Ohio State Route 57
- Pennsylvania Route 57 (former)
- South Carolina Highway 57
- Tennessee State Route 57
- Texas State Highway 57
  - Texas State Highway Loop 57 (former)
  - Texas State Highway Spur 57
  - Farm to Market Road 57
  - Texas Park Road 57
- Utah State Route 57
- Virginia State Route 57
- West Virginia Route 57
- Wisconsin Highway 57

== See also ==
- A57 § Roads

Preceded by 56	Lists of highways 57	Succeeded by 58
