= Woodland Beach, Michigan =

- Census-designated place (CDP) & unincorporated community
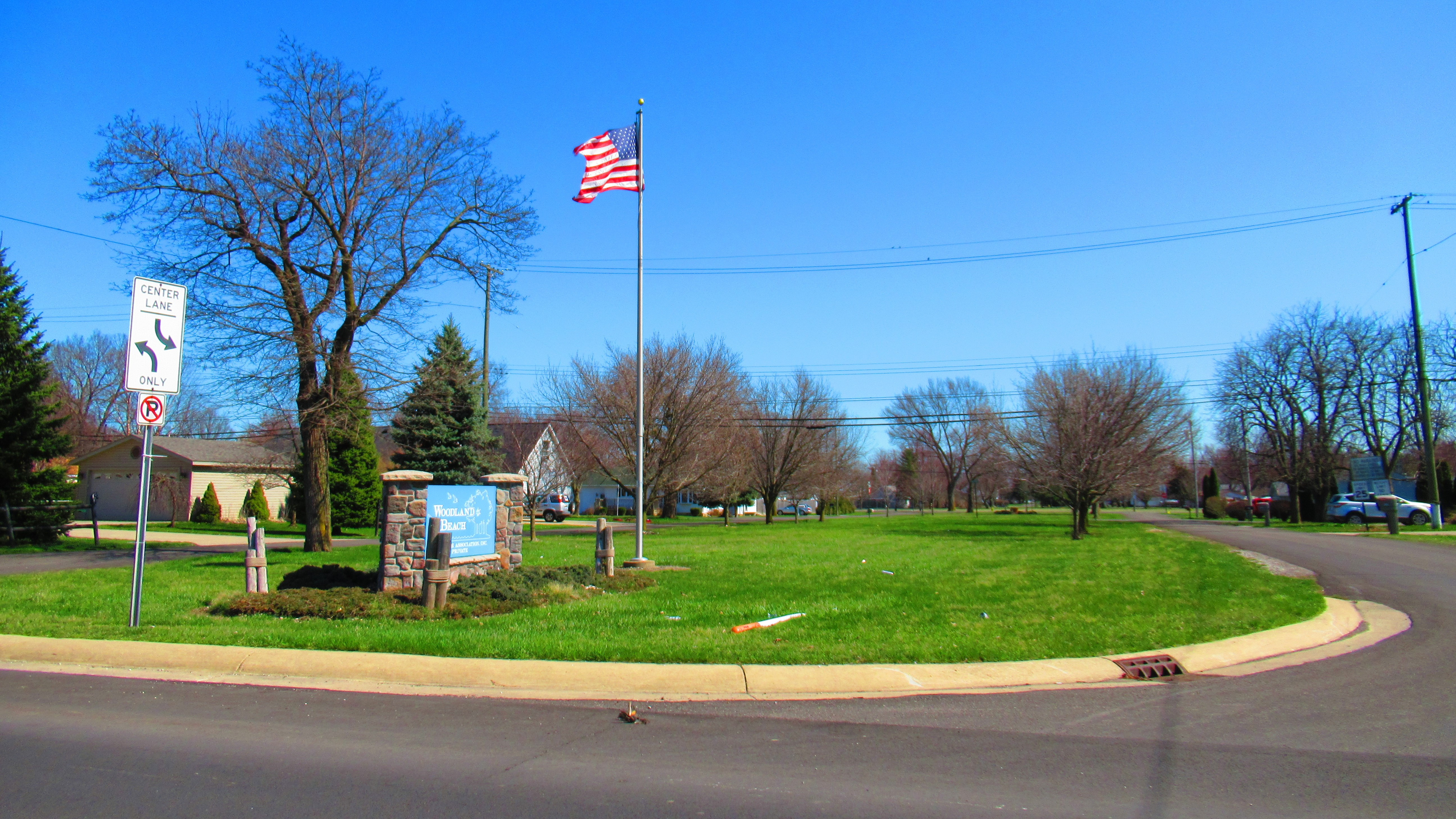
- Woodland Beach along N. Dixie Highway

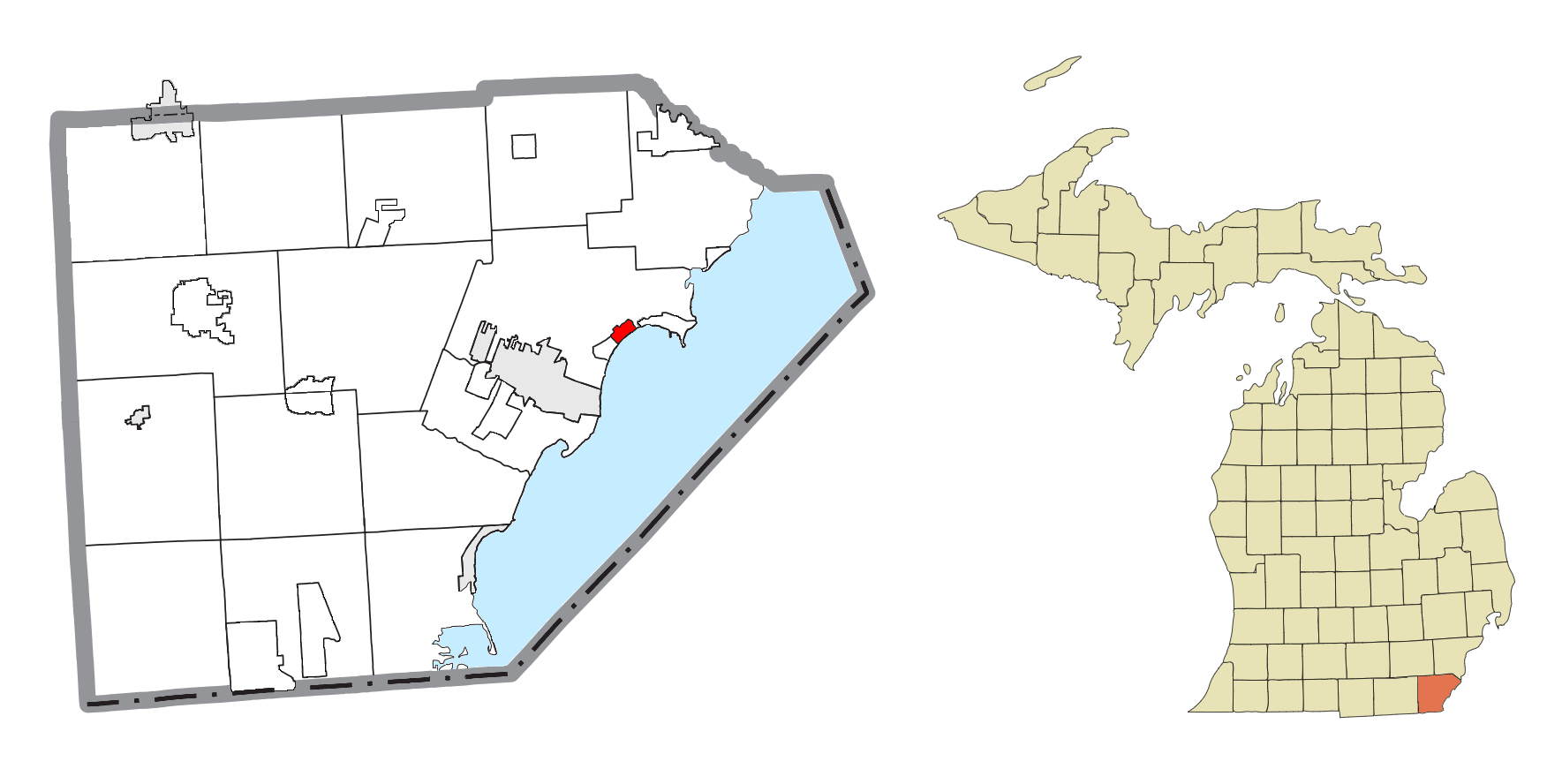
- Location within Monroe County

- Location within the state of Michigan Location within the United States
- Coordinates: 41°56′24″N 83°18′48″W
- Country: United States
- State: Michigan
- County: Monroe
- Township: Frenchtown

Area
  - Total: 0.53 sq mi (1.36 km^{2})
  - Land: 0.52 sq mi (1.35 km^{2})
  - Water: 0.0039 sq mi (0.01 km^{2})
- Elevation: 577 ft (176 m)

Population (2020)
  - Total: 1,899
  - Density: 3,653.3/sq mi (1,410.54/km^{2})
- Time zone: UTC-5 (Eastern (EST))
  - Summer (DST): UTC-4 (EDT)
- ZIP code(s): 48162 (Monroe)
- Area code: 734
- FIPS code: 26-88480
- GNIS feature ID: 1616752

Woodland Beach is a census-designated place (CDP) and unincorporated community in Monroe County in the U.S. state of Michigan. The population was 1,899 at the 2020 census. The CDP is located within Frenchtown Charter Township.

Woodland Beach and its surrounding communities are served by Jefferson Schools.

== Geography ==
According to the U.S. Census Bureau, the CDP has a total area of 0.53 square miles (1.37 km^{2}), of which 0.52 square miles (1.35 km^{2}) is land and 0.01 square miles (0.03 km^{2}) (1.89%) is water.

The CDP includes several lakefront community along the shores of Lake Erie, about 4.0 miles (6.4 km) northeast of the city of Monroe. The communities include Erie Shores, Grand Beach, Indian Trails, and Woodland Beach. The CDP stretches from South Grove Drive on the south to Stony Creek on the north. The majority of the CDP lies southeast of North Dixie Highway with a small portion of the Woodland Beach community extending northwest of North Dixie Highway. The CDP of Detroit Beach is adjacent to the southwest, and the CDP of Stony Point is about 3.0 miles (4.8 km) to the east.

The community was named for its wooded location and beachfront on Lake Erie.

== Demographics ==
Historical population
Census	Pop.	Note	%±
1990	2,309		—
2000	2,179		−5.6%
2010	2,049		−6.0%
2020	1,899		−7.3%
U.S. Decennial Census

=== 2020 census ===
As of the 2020 census, Woodland Beach had a population of 1,899. The median age was 43.3 years. 18.9% of residents were under the age of 18 and 17.1% of residents were 65 years of age or older. For every 100 females there were 104.2 males, and for every 100 females age 18 and over there were 103.2 males age 18 and over.

100.0% of residents lived in urban areas, while 0.0% lived in rural areas.

There were 799 households in Woodland Beach, of which 24.9% had children under the age of 18 living in them. Of all households, 44.4% were married-couple households, 22.0% were households with a male householder and no spouse or partner present, and 22.5% were households with a female householder and no spouse or partner present. About 28.1% of all households were made up of individuals and 9.8% had someone living alone who was 65 years of age or older.

There were 867 housing units, of which 7.8% were vacant. The homeowner vacancy rate was 2.9% and the rental vacancy rate was 7.6%.

Racial composition as of the 2020 census
Race	Number	Percent
White	1,746	91.9%
Black or African American	18	0.9%
American Indian and Alaska Native	4	0.2%
Asian	10	0.5%
Native Hawaiian and Other Pacific Islander	0	0.0%
Some other race	7	0.4%
Two or more races	114	6.0%
Hispanic or Latino (of any race)	73	3.8%

=== 2000 census ===
As of the 2000 census, there were 2,179 people, 794 households, and 605 families residing in the CDP. The population density was 4,155.0 inhabitants per square mile (1,604.3/km^{2}). There were 831 housing units at an average density of 1,584.6 per square mile (611.8/km^{2}). The racial makeup of the CDP was 98.12% White, 0.23% African American, 0.18% Native American, 0.09% from other races, and 1.38% from two or more races. Hispanic or Latino of any race were 0.87% of the population.

There were 794 households, out of which 38.3% had children under the age of 18 living with them, 59.6% were married couples living together, 10.2% had a female householder with no husband present, and 23.8% were non-families. 20.3% of all households were made up of individuals, and 7.2% had someone living alone who was 65 years of age or older. The average household size was 2.74 and the average family size was 3.15.

In the CDP, the population was spread out, with 28.1% under the age of 18, 9.6% from 18 to 24, 32.5% from 25 to 44, 22.6% from 45 to 64, and 7.2% who were 65 years of age or older. The median age was 34 years. For every 100 females, there were 100.8 males. For every 100 females age 18 and over, there were 98.1 males.

The median income for a household in the CDP was $45,417, and the median income for a family was $47,212. Males had a median income of $36,296 versus $23,571 for females. The per capita income for the CDP was $17,824. About 7.2% of families and 7.1% of the population were below the poverty line, including 7.0% of those under age 18 and none of those age 65 or over.
