= Stony Point, Michigan =

- Census-designated place (CDP) & unincorporated community
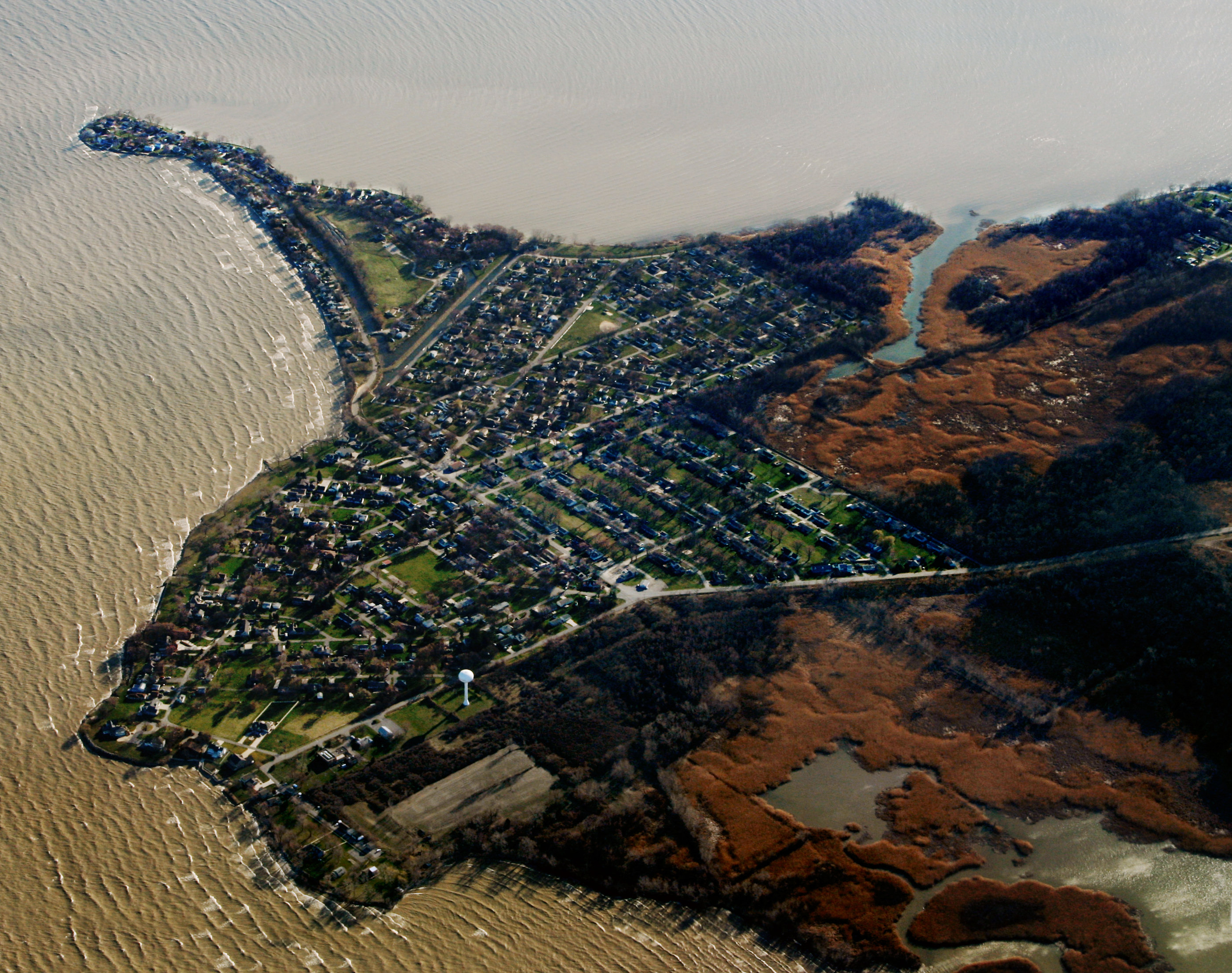
- Stony Point from the air, looking southwest

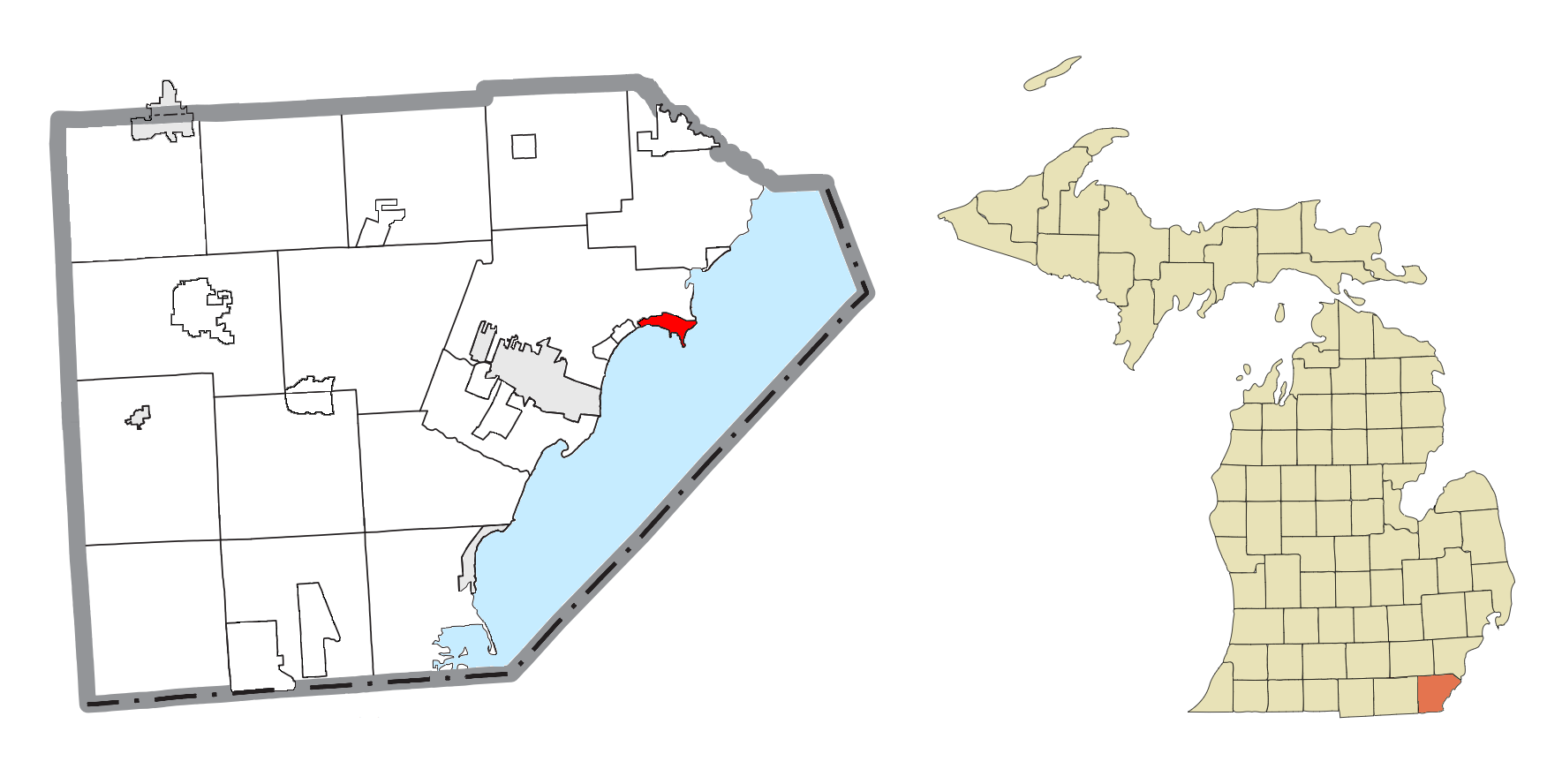
- Location within Monroe County

- Location within the state of Michigan Location within the United States
- Coordinates: 41°56′29″N 83°15′54″W
- Country: United States
- State: Michigan
- County: Monroe
- Township: Frenchtown

Area
  - Total: 1.23 sq mi (3.19 km^{2})
  - Land: 1.21 sq mi (3.13 km^{2})
  - Water: 0.019 sq mi (0.05 km^{2})
- Elevation: 577 ft (176 m)

Population (2020)
  - Total: 1,784
  - Density: 1,469.4/sq mi (567.34/km^{2})
- Time zone: UTC-5 (Eastern (EST))
  - Summer (DST): UTC-4 (EDT)
- ZIP code(s): 48166 (Newport)
- Area code: 734
- FIPS code: 26-76720
- GNIS feature ID: 0638920

Stony Point is an unincorporated community and census-designated place (CDP) in Monroe County in the U.S. state of Michigan. The population was 1,784 at the 2020 census. The CDP is located within Frenchtown Charter Township.

== Geography ==
According to the U.S. Census Bureau, the CDP has a total area of 1.23 square miles (3.19 km^{2}), of which 1.21 square miles (3.13 km^{2}) is land and 0.02 square miles (0.05 km^{2}) (1.63%) is water.

The community is on the shores of Lake Erie, about 7.0 miles (11.3 km) northeast of downtown Monroe. The area defined by the CDP is bounded on the west by Burke Road, on the northwest by Brest Road, and on the north by Pointe aux Peaux Road. The CDP of Woodland Beach is about 3.0 miles (4.8 km) to the west. The Enrico Fermi Nuclear Generating Station is adjacent to the north.

== Demographics ==
Historical population
Census	Pop.	Note	%±
1990	1,598		—
2000	1,775		11.1%
2010	1,724		−2.9%
2020	1,784		3.5%
U.S. Decennial Census

=== 2020 census ===
As of the 2020 census, Stony Point had a population of 1,784. The median age was 42.3 years. 21.0% of residents were under the age of 18 and 15.4% of residents were 65 years of age or older. For every 100 females there were 100.9 males, and for every 100 females age 18 and over there were 98.6 males age 18 and over.

96.4% of residents lived in urban areas, while 3.6% lived in rural areas.

There were 729 households in Stony Point, of which 30.2% had children under the age of 18 living in them. Of all households, 49.8% were married-couple households, 17.3% were households with a male householder and no spouse or partner present, and 22.2% were households with a female householder and no spouse or partner present. About 23.9% of all households were made up of individuals and 9.9% had someone living alone who was 65 years of age or older.

There were 779 housing units, of which 6.4% were vacant. The homeowner vacancy rate was 1.6% and the rental vacancy rate was 10.3%.

Racial composition as of the 2020 census
Race	Number	Percent
White	1,604	89.9%
Black or African American	18	1.0%
American Indian and Alaska Native	16	0.9%
Asian	7	0.4%
Native Hawaiian and Other Pacific Islander	0	0.0%
Some other race	30	1.7%
Two or more races	109	6.1%
Hispanic or Latino (of any race)	58	3.3%

=== 2000 census ===
At the 2000 census, there were 1,775 people, 616 households and 492 families residing in the CDP. The population density was 1,553.6 inhabitants per square mile (599.8/km^{2}). There were 674 housing units at an average density of 589.9 per square mile (227.8/km^{2}). The racial makeup of the CDP was 96.17% White, 0.56% African American, 1.30% Native American, 0.34% Asian, 0.11% Pacific Islander, 0.51% from other races, and 1.01% from two or more races. Hispanic or Latino people of any race were 2.25% of the population.

There were 616 households, of which 43.7% had children under the age of 18 living with them, 63.1% were married couples living together, 11.0% had a female householder with no husband present, and 20.1% were non-families. 16.1% of all households were made up of individuals, and 5.5% had someone living alone who was 65 years of age or older. The average household size was 2.88 and the average family size was 3.23.

30.5% of the population were under the age of 18, 7.6% from 18 to 24, 33.6% from 25 to 44, 21.5% from 45 to 64, and 6.8% who were 65 years of age or older. The median age was 32 years. For every 100 females, there were 109.1 males. For every 100 females age 18 and over, there were 103.1 males.

The median household income was $49,167 and the median family income was $59,583. Males had a median income of $46,542 compared with $30,385 for females. The per capita income for the CDP was $22,667. About 3.3% of families and 4.2% of the population were below the poverty line, including 3.3% of those under age 18 and 5.5% of those age 65 or over.
