= A57 =

A57 may refer to:

== Roads ==
- A57 road, a road connecting Liverpool and Lincoln in England
- A57 autoroute, a road connecting the Tunnel de Toulon to the A8 near Le Luc in France
- A57 motorway, a road connecting Goch and Köln in Germany
- A57 motorway, a road connecting Dolo and Quarto d'Altino in Italy
- A57 highway, a road connecting the autopista AP-9 and autovía A-52 and the airport of Vigo in Spain

== Other uses ==
- Benko Gambit, Encyclopaedia of Chess Openings code A57
- ARM Cortex A57, a computer microprocessor architecture
- Bartini A-57, a 1957 supersonic strategic bomber project
- Chrysler A57 multibank, a Second World War tank engine
- Samsung Galaxy A57 5G, a mid-range Android-based smartphone
- Sony Alpha 57, a DSLT camera
