= Enrico Fermi Nuclear Generating Station =

Nuclear power plant in Frenchtown Charter Township, Michigan

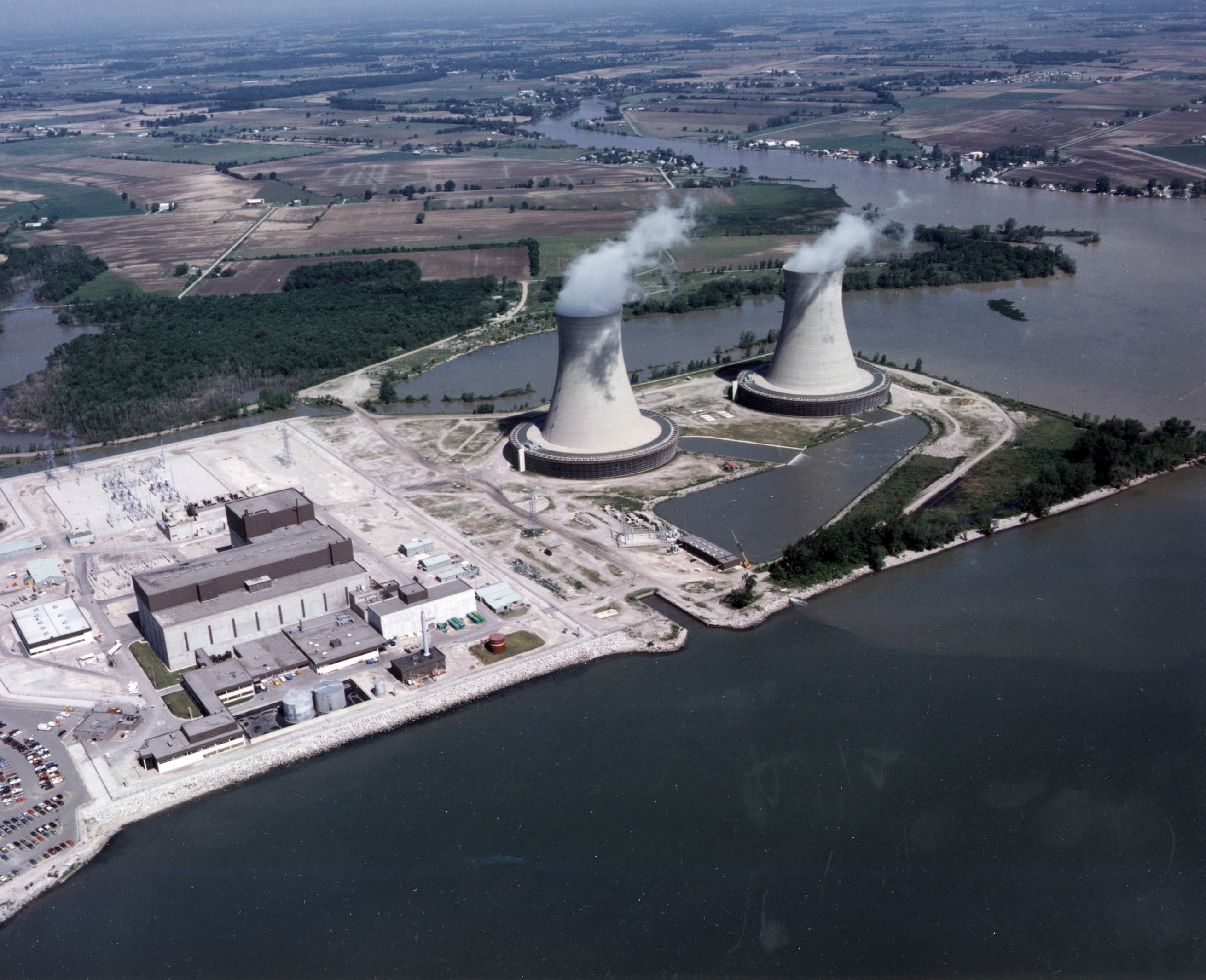
- The Fermi Station (NRC image)
- Official name: Fermi Power Plant
- Country: United States
- Location: Frenchtown Charter Township, Monroe County, Michigan
- Coordinates: 41°57′46″N 83°15′27″W
- Status: Operational
- Construction began: Unit 1: August 8, 1956; Unit 2: September 26, 1972
- Commission date: Unit 1: August 7, 1966; Unit 2: January 23, 1988
- Decommission date: Unit 1: November 29, 1972
- Construction cost: $6.110 billion (2007 USD)
- Owner: DTE Energy
- Operator: DTE Energy

Nuclear power station
- Reactor type: BWR
- Reactor supplier: General Electric
- Cooling towers: 2 × Natural Draft
- Cooling source: Lake Erie
- Thermal capacity: 1 × 3486 MW_{th}

Power generation
- Units operational: 1 × 1202 MW
- Make and model: Unit 1: Liquid Metal FBR; Unit 2: BWR-4 (Mark 1)
- Units planned: 1 × 1520 MW ESBWR
- Units decommissioned: 1 × 61 MW Liquid Metal FBR
- Nameplate capacity: 1150 MW
- Capacity factor: 99.01% (2019); 76.3% (lifetime, excluding Unit 1)
- Annual net output: 9,369 GWh (2021)

External links
- Website: Fermi 2 Power Plant
- Commons: Related media on Commons

The Enrico Fermi Nuclear Generating Station is a nuclear power plant on the shore of Lake Erie near Monroe, in Frenchtown Charter Township, Michigan on approximately 1,000 acres (400 ha). All units of the plant are operated by the DTE Energy Electric Company and owned (100 percent) by parent company DTE Energy. It is approximately halfway between Detroit, Michigan, and Toledo, Ohio. It is also visible from parts of Amherstburg and Colchester, Ontario as well as on the shore of Lake Erie in Ottawa County, Ohio. Two units have been constructed on this site. The first unit's construction started on August 4, 1956 and reached initial criticality on August 23, 1963, and the second unit received its construction permit on September 26, 1972. It reached criticality (head on) on June 21, 1985 and was declared commercial on November 18, 1988. The plant is connected to two single-circuit 345 kV Transmission Lines and three 120 kV lines. They are operated and maintained by ITC Transmission.

The plant is named after the Italian nuclear physicist Enrico Fermi, most noted for his work on the development of the first nuclear reactor as well as many other major contributions to nuclear physics. Fermi won the 1938 Nobel Prize in Physics for his work on induced radioactivity.

On October 5, 1966, Fermi 1, a prototype fast breeder reactor, suffered a partial fuel meltdown, although no radioactive material was released. After repairs it was shut down by 1972.

On August 8, 2008, John McCain was taken on a 45-minute tour of the plant, becoming the first actively campaigning presidential candidate to visit a nuclear plant.

== Fermi 1 ==
The 69 MWe prototype fast breeder reactor Fermi 1 unit was under construction and development at the site from 1956 to 1963. Initial criticality was achieved on August 23, 1963. On October 5, 1966 Fermi 1 suffered a partial fuel meltdown. Two of the 92 fuel assemblies were partially damaged. According to the Nuclear Regulatory Commission (NRC), there was no abnormal radioactivity released into the environment.

Fermi 1 was a liquid metal (sodium) cooled fast breeder reactor design. It was capable of producing 200 megawatts thermal (MWt) power or 69 MW electrical power with 26% enriched metallic uranium fuel. The enriched uranium section of the reactor (core) was a 30 inches (76 cm) in diameter cylinder by 30 inches high and contained 92 fuel assemblies. The core was surrounded by 548 additional assemblies containing depleted uranium. These assemblies were about 2.5 inches (6.4 cm) square by about 8 feet (2.4 m) tall. Only the core section contained the enriched uranium while depleted uranium was placed above and below within the assemblies. The core also contained 2 control rods and 8 safety rods. The plant was designed for 430 MWt and 125 MWe using a newer uranium oxide fuel, but the plant was closed before the fuel was ever ordered.

A 168 MWe oil-fired boiler was added in 1966 to utilize the turbine-generator during periods when the reactor was not producing power.

The main cause of the partial meltdown was a temperature increase caused by a blockage in one of the lower support plate orifices that allowed the flow of liquid sodium into the reactor. The blockage caused an insufficient amount of coolant to enter the fuel assembly; this was not noticed by the operators until the core temperature alarms sounded. Several fuel rod subassemblies reached high temperatures of around 700 °F (370 °C) (with an expected range near 580 °F, 304 °C), causing them to melt.

Following an extended shutdown that involved fuel replacement, repairs to vessel, and cleanup, Fermi 1 restarted in July 1970 and reached full power. Due to lack of funds and aging equipment, it was finally shut down permanently on November 27, 1972, and was officially decommissioned December 31, 1975, under the definition of the Atomic Energy Commission (AEC). Later, the Nuclear Regulatory Commission (NRC) replaced the AEC and under their new definitions, Fermi was re-designated as being in SAFSTOR due to some remaining radioactivity at the site. On May 16, 1996, decommissioning was restarted. However, by November 2011 with very little activity remaining, a decision was made to halt further work. It is currently in SAFSTOR.

== Fermi 2 ==
Fermi 2 is a 1,202 MWe General Electric boiling water reactor owned and operated by DTE Energy. Plans to build were announced in July 1968. Initial criticality was achieved in July 1985, and full commercial operation commenced on January 23, 1988.

The reactor vessel holds 764 fuel assemblies and 185 control rods which modulate the power. The fuel assemblies are about 6 inches (15 cm) square by about 12 feet (3.7 m) long. The original turbine generator was an English Electric unit. After a turbine blade incident in 1993, the company replaced the turbine with a General Electric unit. Water flowing through the reactor vessel changes to saturated steam and then travels to the main turbine-generator to produce electricity. After that, the steam drops into a main condenser where it is condensed to liquid water and is recycled. A secondary loop of water which enters the tube side of the condenser is non-radioactive. It flows to two large cooling towers which stand 400 feet (120 m) tall where the hot water is cooled by natural circulation with ambient air. This is a closed loop with only a small amount of make-up water needed from Lake Erie to replace any evaporation.

Two 345 kV lines send power to the customers. Those same lines are used to supply electricity to the site's safety equipment. Three additional 120 kV lines are also available to supply any needed back-up power to safety equipment. Additionally, four diesel generators and four combustion turbine generators are on site to power plant safety equipment during an emergency.

== Fermi 3 ==
The original Fermi 3 project was to be a companion unit identical to Fermi 2. It was ordered in 1972 and cancelled in 1974.

In September 2008, Detroit Edison filed an application with the Nuclear Regulatory Commission (NRC) for a Combined Construction and Operating License (COL) for a third reactor. The new unit is supposed to be built on the same site, slightly to the southwest of Fermi 2. The reactor design selected is the 1,550 MWe GE-designed passive Economic Simplified Boiling Water Reactor (ESBWR). The cost was estimated at as much as $10 billion. CEO Anthony Earley said that DTE's analysis "so far shows that nuclear power will, over the long term, be the most cost-effective baseload option for our customers, ... We expect nuclear to remain the low-cost option, but we will continue to evaluate nuclear against other resources and will commit to proceeding with construction only at the right time and at the right cost".

In March 2009, a coalition of citizen groups asked federal regulators to reject plans for Fermi 3, contending that it would pose a range of threats to public health and the environment. The groups have filed 14 contentions with the NRC, claiming that a new plant would pose "radioactive, toxic and thermal impacts on Lake Erie's vulnerable western basin."

In May 2015, the NRC approved a combined construction and operating license for Fermi 3, but DTE Energy stated there were no plans for construction at that time.

In 2025, DTE and state legislators expressed openness to moving forward on a Fermi 3 reactor; the company does not have construction plans but retains the NRC license.

== Electricity production ==
Enrico Fermi generated 9,369 GWh in 2021.

Generation (MWh) of Enrico Fermi Nuclear Generating Station (Nuclear Only)
Year	Jan	Feb	Mar	Apr	May	Jun	Jul	Aug	Sep	Oct	Nov	Dec	Annual (Total)
2001	837,317	749,423	826,750	706,554	820,950	788,930	807,415	808,623	789,911	682,435	4,215	732,906	8,554,429
2002	754,646	747,823	787,509	748,349	803,401	782,676	808,970	812,726	761,918	750,016	809,899	733,036	9,300,969
2003	792,252	739,490	715,806	0	511,787	794,164	815,027	647,050	634,415	829,640	808,058	831,137	8,119,826
2004	806,624	780,998	820,295	800,538	819,977	788,170	798,842	559,250	690,868	823,176	120,316	639,135	8,148,189
2005	638,803	580,711	836,444	795,506	824,948	651,229	382,159	808,499	787,950	817,527	803,264	829,535	8,256,575
2006	826,505	741,765	628,246	-4,995	351,357	575,260	298,836	778,553	795,716	834,895	811,764	839,484	8,477,386
2007	834,917	758,801	833,841	803,087	824,781	787,187	809,717	808,869	733,362	-4,585	295,391	828,414	8,513,782
2008	824,333	686,950	832,186	801,333	823,695	782,492	808,543	812,034	783,971	825,617	803,232	829,020	9,312,406
2009	831,971	738,853	683,436	-6,333	790,316	701,690	808,089	804,660	753,809	-12,439	482,400	829,456	7,405,908
2010	826,918	749,495	623,775	793,322	813,878	479,742	795,331	794,235	778,885	618,402	-5,410	469,291	7,737,864
2011	534,432	333,314	838,538	805,527	817,678	785,224	800,118	799,927	785,625	826,294	735,321	828,212	9,089,210
2012	834,658	777,846	656,219	-4,106	653,365	600,935	37,766	524,001	419,846	538,502	96,113	-12,853	5,121,312
2013	537,127	489,402	529,856	432,891	357,159	512,775	522,400	526,801	275,094	789,239	791,587	834,631	6,598,962
2014	758,405	199,990	-7,892	418,973	835,139	803,349	832,984	831,297	675,619	824,306	829,905	790,055	7,491,130
2015	858,364	773,670	488,848	717,719	838,762	800,473	827,467	824,769	311,762	-4,502	36,567	856,647	7,430,546
2016	850,045	777,617	809,987	775,356	528,942	795,328	820,585	735,534	781,395	843,167	579,125	849,685	9,146,766
2017	835,616	703,599	456,092	257,639	812,392	813,633	837,826	837,283	815,015	843,601	742,902	736,097	8,691,095
2018	852,277	769,471	858,594	352,509	548,214	804,769	801,125	829,578	556,224	81,361	822,023	135,797	7,411,942
2019	785,040	778,181	854,992	824,974	843,326	801,909	829,265	834,317	806,150	849,237	833,658	845,211	9,785,260
2020	835,251	789,446	542,950	-4,048	-4,928	-10,767	-12,197	605,277	816,397	826,569	825,019	861,809	6,070,778
2021	862,181	778,083	848,857	854,960	606,853	805,918	720,963	823,172	804,553	833,474	816,979	613,543	9,368,536
2022	447,923	61,614	-4,597	-4,659	428,094	707,974	834,965	835,376	807,845	854,836	830,979	861,750	6,762,100
2023	858,340	776,291	858,879	826,446	849,293	806,748	796,215	460,510	589,351	849,006	827,027	857,884	9,355,990
2024	634,915	694,331	594,205	-3,974	498,966	811,107	837,489	837,336	813,521	845,615	831,310	860,986	8,255,807
2025	860,695	770,685	854,951	823,495	848,523	803,520	828,344	824,738	810,121	841,496	824,766	856,620	9,947,954
2026	807,886	717,071	530,899	-4,216	211,590	640,506	519,957	855,727					--

== Surrounding population ==
The Nuclear Regulatory Commission (NRC) defines two emergency planning zones around nuclear power plants: a plume exposure pathway zone with a radius of 10 miles (16 km), concerned primarily with exposure to, and inhalation of, airborne radioactive contamination, and an ingestion pathway zone of about 50 miles (80 km), concerned primarily with ingestion of food and liquid contaminated by radioactivity.

The 2010 U.S. population within 50 miles (80 km) of Enrico Fermi was 4,799,526, a decrease of 3.4 percent in a decade, according to an analysis of U.S. Census data for msnbc.com. Cities within 50 miles (80 km) include Detroit (30 miles (48 km) to city center) and Toledo (27 miles (43 km)). Additional population within 50 miles (80 km) is in Canada, including Windsor, Ontario, 26 miles (42 km).

== Seismic risk ==
The Nuclear Regulatory Commission's 2010 estimate of the risk each year of an earthquake intense enough to cause core damage to the reactor at Fermi was 1 in 238,095 making it the 88th least likely to be damaged of all US nuclear generating stations.

== Reactor data ==
The Enrico Fermi Nuclear Generating Station consists of one operational reactor, one closed unit and one additional is planned.

Reactor Unit	Reactor Type	Electrical Generation Capacity		Construction Start	Initial Criticality	Commercial Operation Start	Permanent Shutdown
Reactor Unit	Reactor Type	Net	Gross	Construction Start	Initial Criticality	Commercial Operation Start	Permanent Shutdown
Fermi 1	LMFBR	60 MW	69 MW	8/8/1956	8/23/1963	7/8/1966	11/29/1972
Fermi 2	BWR-4	1150 MW	1202 MW	9/26/1972	7/2/1985	1/23/1988	
Fermi 3 (planned)	ESBWR	1490 MW	1550 MW				
