= Sterling State Park =

Park in Michigan, USA

William C. Sterling State Park
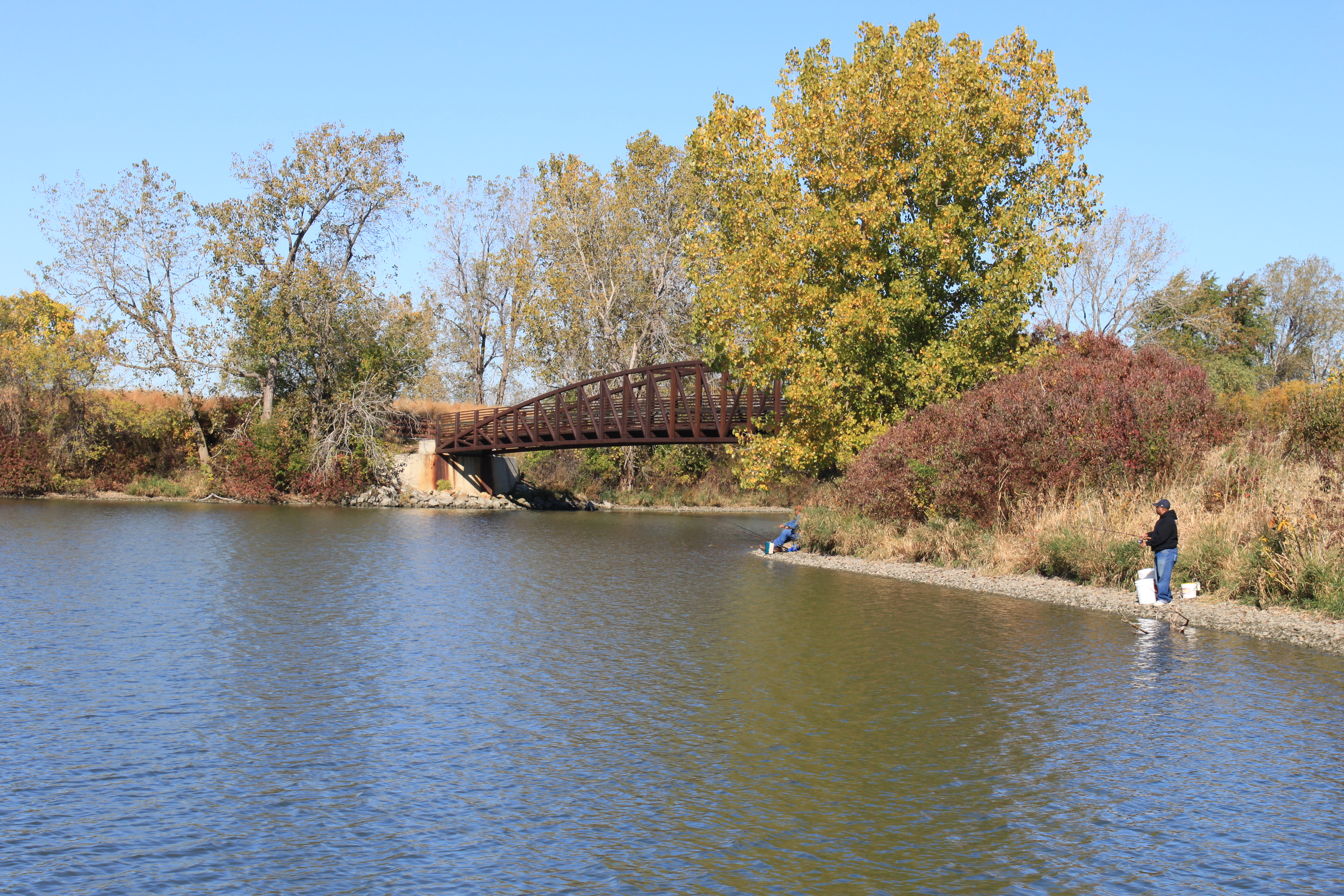
- Pedestrian bridge over lagoon

- Location within Michigan Location within the United States
- Location: Frenchtown Charter Township, Monroe County, Michigan, United States
- Nearest city: Monroe, Michigan
- Coordinates: 41°54′56″N 83°20′01″W
- Area: 1,300 acres (530 ha)
- Elevation: 591 feet (180 m)
- Established: 1935
- Administrator: Michigan Department of Natural Resources
- Designation: Michigan state park
- Website: Official website

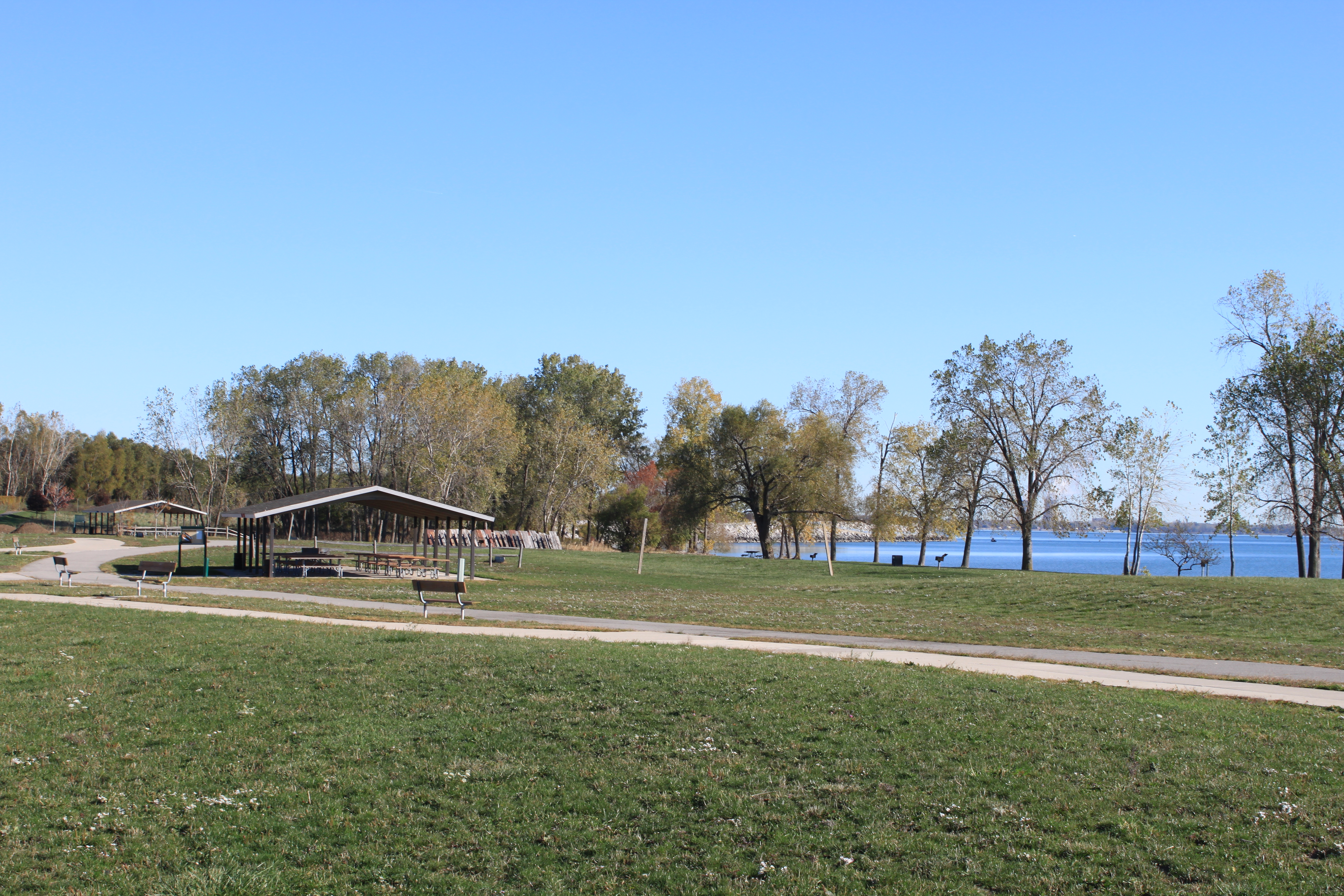
Picnic area adjacent to Lake Erie

William C. Sterling State Park is a public recreation area located in Frenchtown Charter Township with a small portion lying within the city limits of Monroe, Michigan. It is the only Michigan state park located on Lake Erie. The park encompasses 1,300 acres (530 ha) of mostly man-made lagoons and beachfront near the mouth of Sandy Creek. The main attractions at the park include a 256-site campground, beach area, boat launch, and shore fishing lagoons. There are over seven miles (11 km) of biking and hiking trails within the park.

== History ==
The park is named for William Clark Sterling (1849–1924), a businessman and outdoorsman who bought marshland at the mouth of the Detroit River and was one of the first to see the value in protecting swamps for future generations and the good of the environment. The state acquired the park's first 134 acres—a narrow strip lying between Lake Erie and a lagoon—in 1935. A portion of the land had been donated by the city of Monroe and the Monroe Piers Land Company, which had once been owned by Sterling. The park was dedicated the following year.

For quite some time, Sterling State Park was greatly polluted by river runoff from Detroit, and swimming in the water was not recommended and even illegal. In an effort to preserve the Lake Erie coastline after decades of pollutants from the Detroit River emptied into the region—killing off tremendous amounts of wildlife and leaving the lake largely uninhabitable—millions of dollars were spent and the region was cleaned up and partially restored.

In the late 1990s, the Environmental Protection Agency declared the area to be an environmental concern due to the level of pollutants in Lake Erie and the River Raisin. When studying fish in the area, PCB levels increased 87% from the 1988 to 1998. The result of the overpollution came from the sudden industrial growth surrounding the River Raisin delta and Lake Erie. The largest of these industries include a Ford plant and the coal-burning Monroe Power Plant, both of which caused severe impacts on the ecosystem of the area. In September 1997, the Ford completed an environmental dredging project in the River Raisin and removed approximately 25,000 cubic yards (19,000 m³) of toxic PCB-contaminated sediment from the River Raisin.

In 2001, William C. Sterling State Park was included as the southern border of the Detroit River International Wildlife Refuge. This allowed the park to receive federal funding for a $12 million renovation project. The park was closed during the 2003 season while the renovation was carried out to the park, which was remodeled to include miles of wetland walking paths open to the public in an area that had been closed since the early 1900s. Today, the park boasts many lagoons and marshes, providing good habitat for a variety of wildlife and bird life that have returned to the area. During the time of renovation, there was a threat of E. coli bacteria in the lake waters, which resulted in several deaths in neighboring Ontario. William C. Sterling State Park was not tested since the park was closed at the time. Swimming in Lake Erie is constantly monitored to make sure that the level of toxins are low enough not to pose a threat to human safety. The once severely polluted lake has undergone much restoration in the past decade, which has greatly benefited William C. Sterling State Park.

== Activities and amenities ==
William C. Sterling State Park includes 256 camp sites, as well as picnic areas and shelters, biking and hiking trails, a recreational metal detecting area, beach access, and playgrounds.
