= Scofield, Michigan =

- Unincorporated community
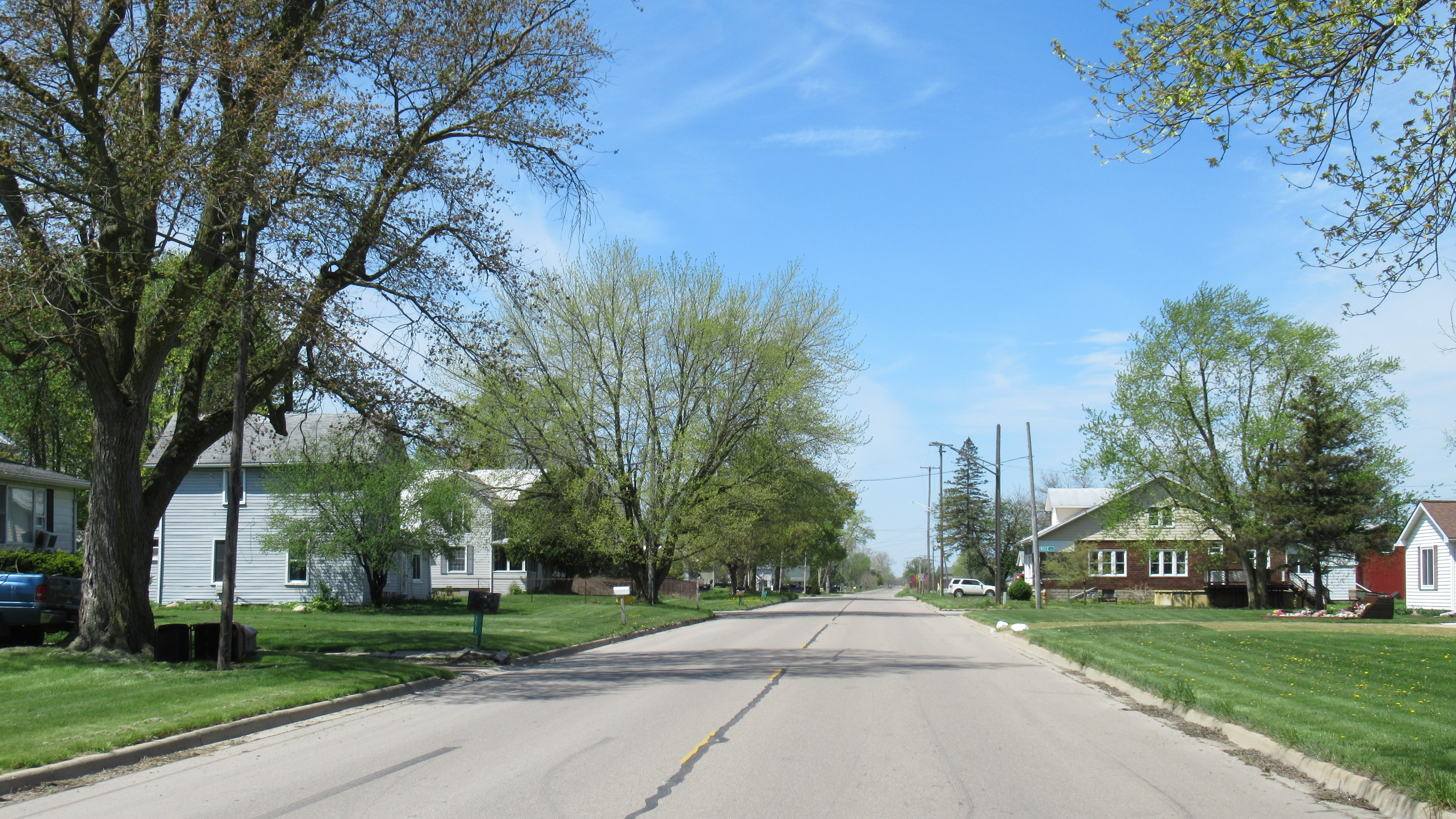
- Looking west along Scofield Road

- Location within the state of Michigan Location within the United States
- Coordinates: 42°01′17″N 83°28′55″W
- Country: United States
- State: Michigan
- County: Monroe
- Township: Exeter
- Settled: 1872
- Elevation: 630 ft (190 m)
- Time zone: UTC-5 (Eastern (EST))
  - Summer (DST): UTC-4 (EDT)
- ZIP code(s): 48159 (Maybee)
- Area code: 734
- GNIS feature ID: 637454

Scofield (/skoʊˈfiːld/ SKOH-field) is an unincorporated community in Monroe County in the U.S. state of Michigan. The community is located within Exeter Township. As an unincorporated community, Scofield has no legally defined boundaries or population statistics of its own.

== Geography ==
Scofield is located in south-central Exeter Township within rural Monroe County. It is centered along the intersection of Scofield Road and Sumpter Road about 10 miles (16.1 km) northwest of the city of Monroe. The community sits at an elevation of 630 feet (190 m) above sea level.

The Helser Drain and Ross Drain run through the community, which provide drainage into Stony Creek. The main branch of Stony Creek runs about one mile (1.6 km) north of the center of the community.

The community of Scofield is served by Monroe Public Schools at the northern edge of the district's boundaries. Scofield does not contain its own post office and uses the Maybee 48159 ZIP Code. Areas just northeast of the center of the community may use the Carleton 48117 ZIP Code.

Other nearby communities include the villages of Maybee to the southwest and Carleton to the northeast, as well as the unincorporated community of Steiner to the southeast.

== History ==
Scofield was first settled around 1872 when a railway line was built through the area. The line was constructed by the Chicago and Canada Southern Railway, and Scofield contained a station along its route. The railway line continues to run just southeast of the center of the community. The line is currently operated by Canadian National Railway but no longer contains a station at this point along its route.

A post office was first established in Scofield on January 20, 1874. The post office remained in operation until it was discontinued on September 15, 1935.

The McGowan School building is located within Scofield. The school began operating in the 1860s, and the current structure was built around 1888. The one-room schoolhouse remained in operation until the area was consolidated into nearby Airport Community Schools, and the McGowan School was closed in 1996. After it was closed, it was restored and moved to Scofield in 2003. It currently serves as a rental hall and is located in a park right behind the current township hall. The current township hall is located at 6158 Scofield Road. The historic Exeter Township Hall was built in 1890 and is located at 10296 Sumpter Road within Scofield. It no longer serves its original purpose, and the structure was dedicated as a Michigan State Historic Site on September 3, 1998.

Scofield remains as an unincorporated community with a small population and a few businesses. It is denoted as the "village of Scofield" according to road signage along Scofield Road and again along Sumpter Road, although the community holds no legal autonomy as an incorporated village.

== Images ==
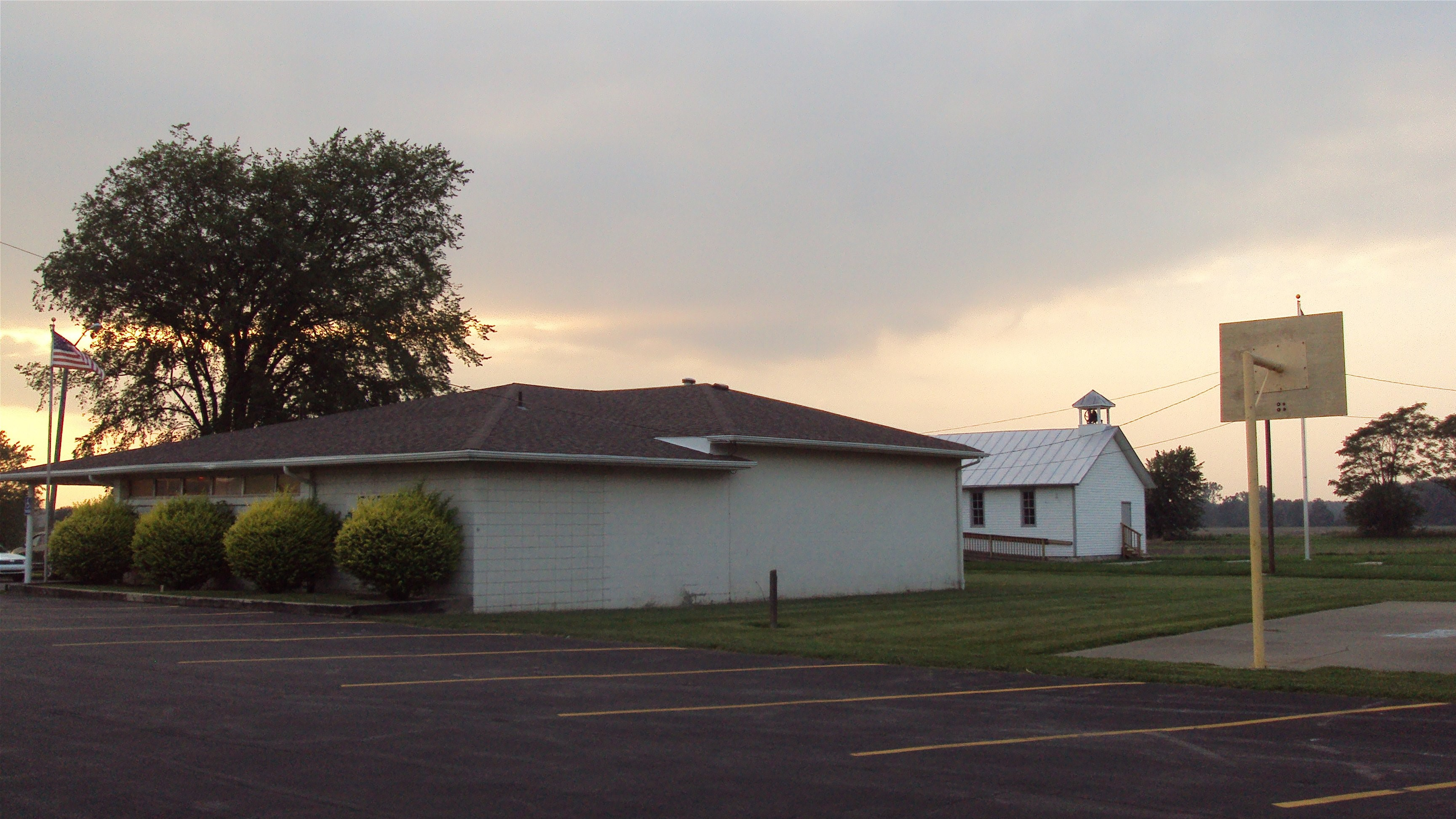
Township hall and McGowan School

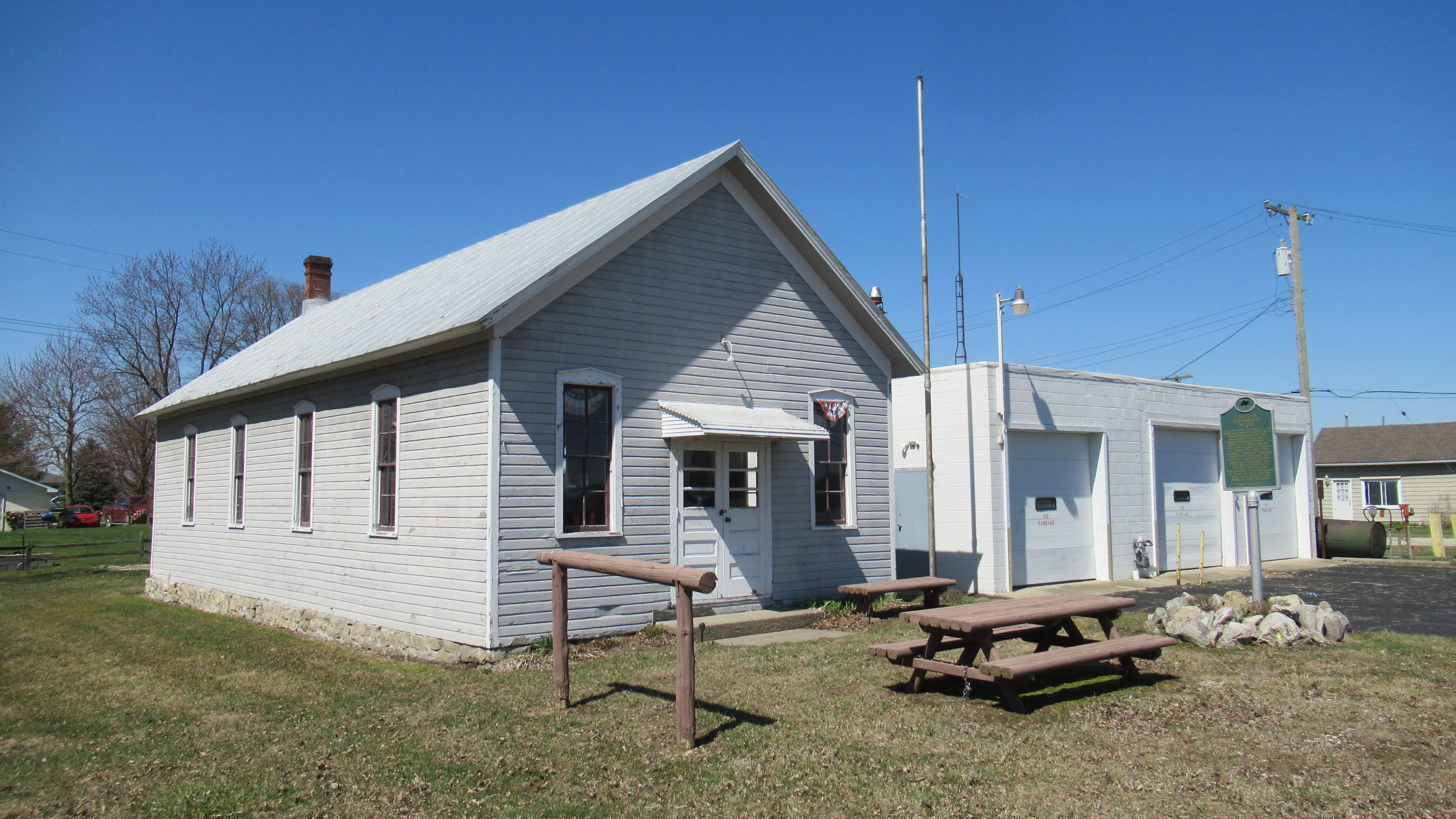
Former township hall in Scofield

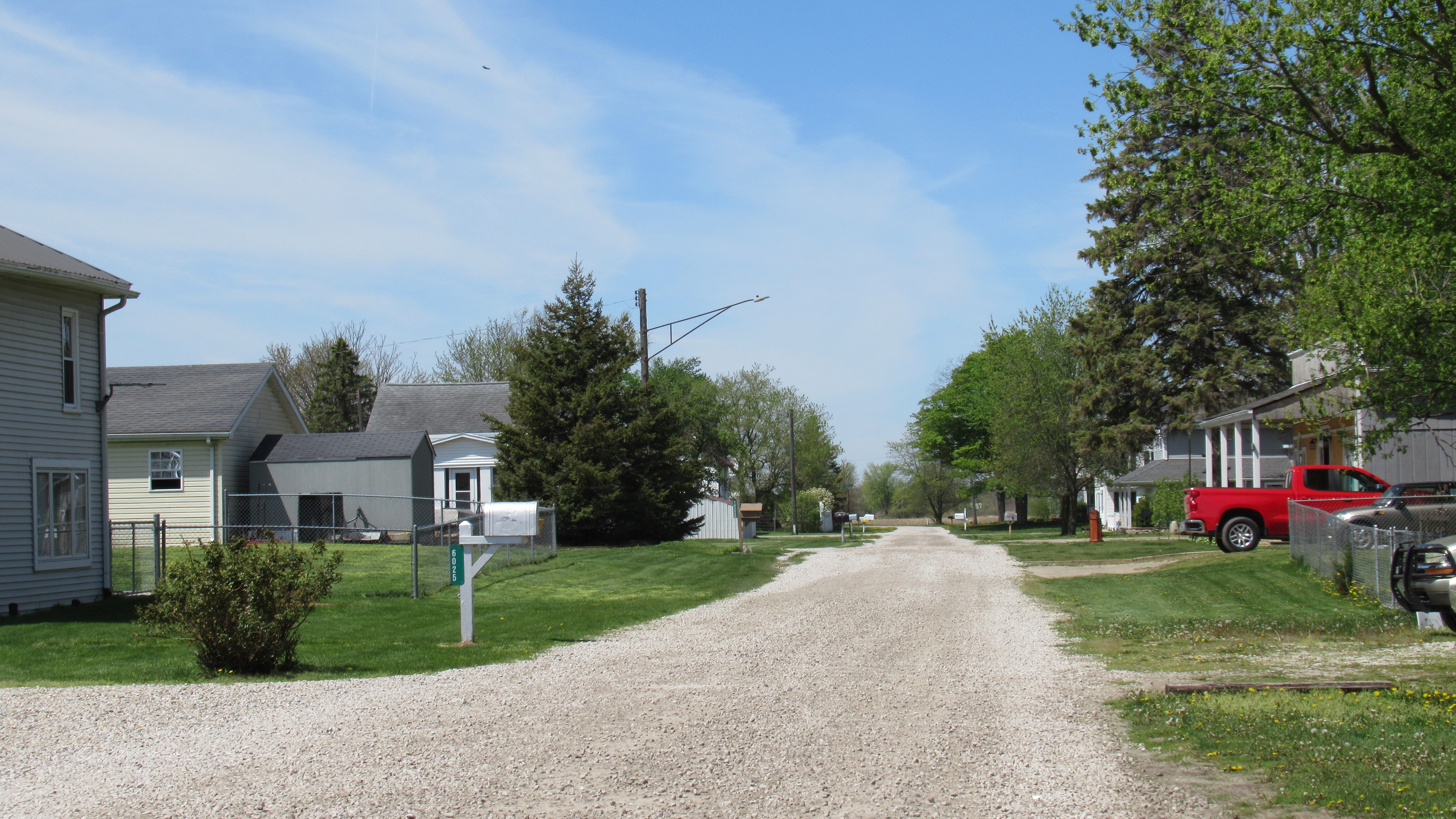
Summit Street toward Main Street

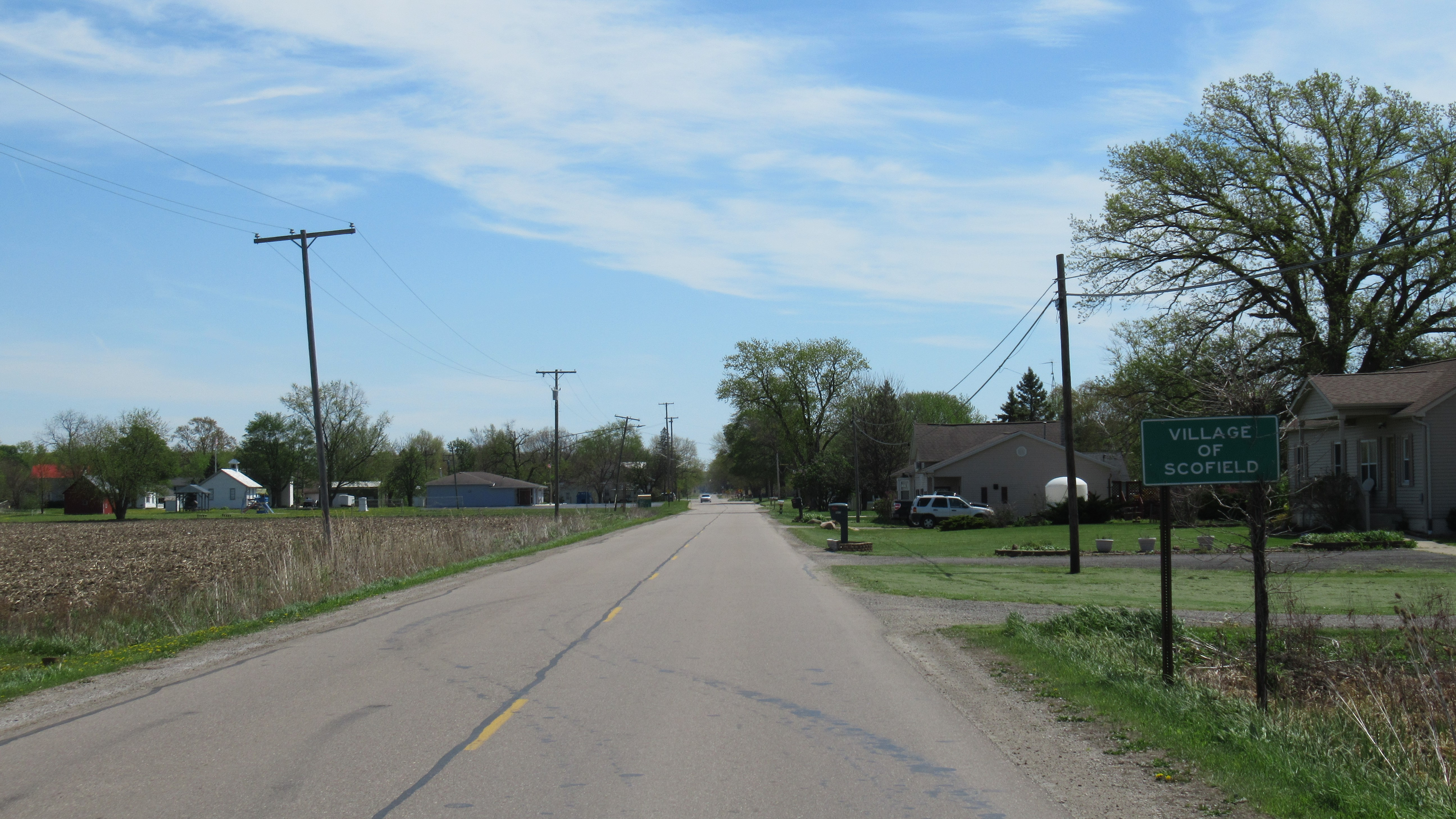
Road signage along Scofield Road
