= Elmina (disambiguation) =

Elmina is a town and the capital of the Komenda/Edina/Eguafo/Abirem District in the Central Region of Ghana.

Elmina may also refer to:

== People ==
- Elmina M. Roys Gavitt (1828–1898), American physician; medical journal founder, editor-in-chief
- Elmina R. Lucke (1889–1987), American educator and social worker
- Elmina Moisan (1897-1938), Chilean painter
- Elmina Shepard Taylor (1830–1904), American women's rights activist
- Elmina D. Slenker (1827–1908), American writer and sex reformer
- Elmina Springer (1831–1912), American women's rights activist
- Elmina Wilson (1870–1918), American civil engineer

== Places ==
- El Mina, Lebanon
- Elmina, Malaysia
- El Mina, Mauritania

== Other uses ==
- Elmina Castle, in Elmina, Ghana
- Elmina Estate, an oil palm plantation in Malaysia
- Battle of Elmina (disambiguation)
- Elmina (film), a 2010 Ghanaian movie
