= Freddie Bishop =

American football player (born 1990)

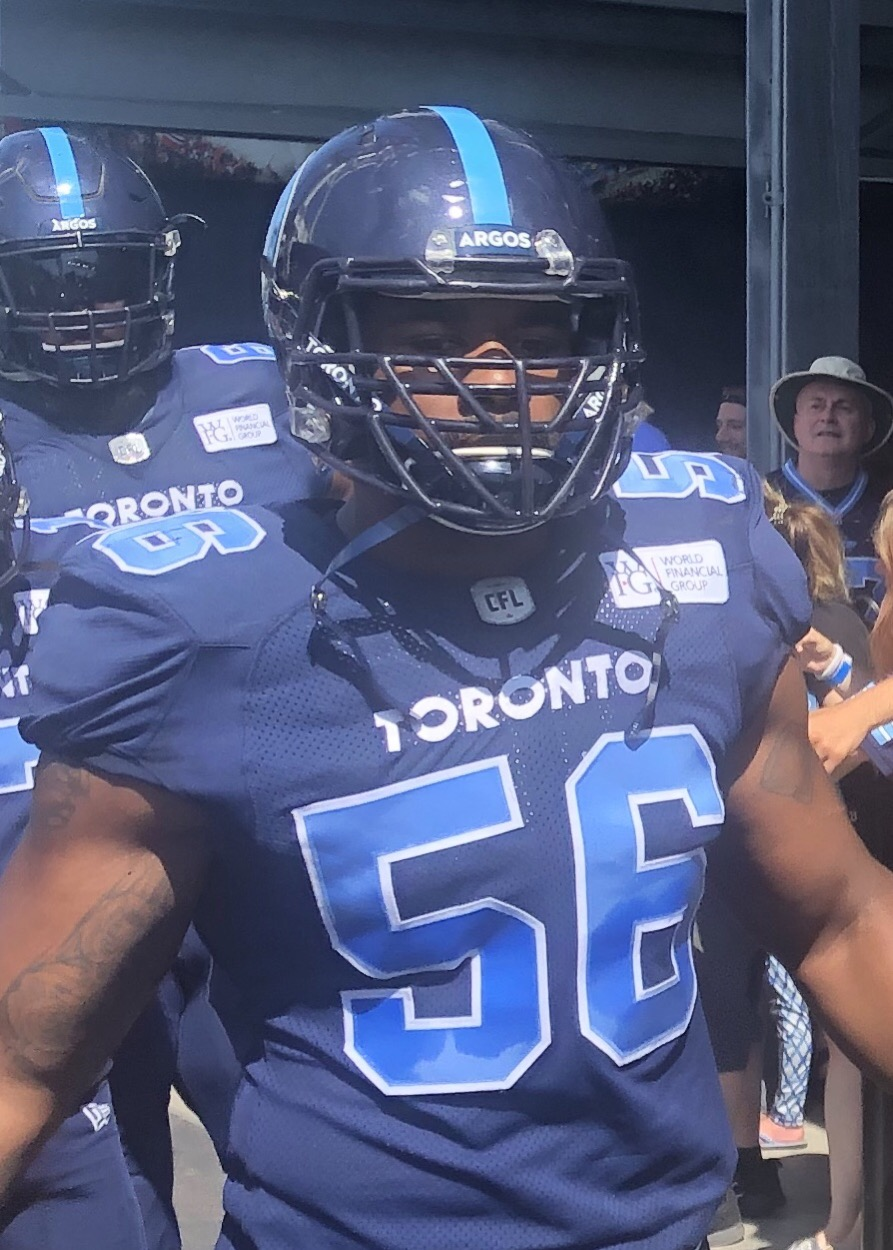
- Bishop with the Toronto Argonauts in 2019

No. 56, 50, 95
- Position: Defensive lineman

Personal information
- Born: February 25, 1990 (age 36); Inkster, Michigan, U.S.
- Listed height: 6 ft 3 in (1.91 m)
- Listed weight: 255 lb (116 kg)

Career information
- High school: Airport (Carleton, Michigan)
- College: Western Michigan
- NFL draft: 2013: undrafted

Career history
- Detroit Lions (2013)*; Calgary Stampeders (2013–2015); New York Jets (2016–2017); Detroit Lions (2018)*; Memphis Express (2019); Toronto Argonauts (2019); Saskatchewan Roughriders (2021)
- * Offseason or practice squad member only

Awards and highlights
- Grey Cup champion (2014); Second-team All-MAC (2012); Third-team All-MAC (2011)

Career NFL statistics
- Total tackles: 19
- Fumble recoveries: 1
- Stats at Pro Football Reference

Career CFL statistics
- Total tackles: 60
- Sacks: 14.0
- Fumble fumbles: 1
- Stats at CFL.ca

Freddie George Bishop III (born February 25, 1990) is an American former professional football player who was a defensive lineman in the National Football League (NFL) and Canadian Football League (CFL). He played college football for the Western Michigan Broncos. He was a member of the Detroit Lions, Calgary Stampeders, New York Jets, Memphis Express, Toronto Argonauts, and Saskatchewan Roughriders.

== Early life ==
Bishop first played high school football at Robichaud High School. He earned all-city honors as a freshman and sophomore in 2004 and 2005. He earned All-Mega Conference honors in 2005 and was named Team Defensive Most Valuable Player in 2004. He transferred to Airport High School in Carleton, Michigan, and earned All-Huron League honors in 2007 and was named first-team all-state as a senior. He also received Honorable Mention All-Huron League honors in 2006.

== College career ==
Bishop played for the Western Michigan Broncos from 2009 to 2012. He was redshirted in 2008. He was named Second-team All-MAC and was the Broncos' outstanding team player after starting all 12 games, recording 63 tackles, including 11.5 tackles for loss and four sacks in 2012. He was also named Third-team All-MAC Defensive End in 2011.

== Professional career ==
Pre-draft measurables
Height	Weight	40-yard dash	10-yard split	20-yard split	20-yard shuttle	Three-cone drill	Vertical jump	Broad jump	Bench press
6 ft 3 in (1.91 m)	253 lb (115 kg)	4.88 s	1.69 s	2.82 s	4.52 s	7.42 s	37 1/2 in (0.95 m)	9 ft 9 in (2.97 m)	30 reps
All values from Western Michigan Pro Day

=== Detroit Lions (first stint) ===
Bishop signed with the Detroit Lions on May 14, 2013 after going undrafted in the 2013 NFL draft. He was released by the Lions on June 26, 2013.

=== Calgary Stampeders ===
Bishop was signed to the Calgary Stampeders' practice roster on July 16, 2013. Bishop, seeing significant playing time due to an earlier injury to Charleston Hughes, recorded five tackles and a sack in the Stampeders win against the Hamilton Tiger-Cats in the 102nd Grey Cup.

=== New York Jets ===
Bishop signed with the New York Jets on February 5, 2016. On September 3, 2016, he was released by the Jets as part of final roster cuts and was signed to the practice squad the next day. He was promoted to the active roster on December 10, 2016.

On September 3, 2017, Bishop was waived by the Jets and was signed to the practice squad the next day. He was promoted to the active roster on September 16, 2017. He was waived on September 21, 2017 and later re-signed to the practice squad on October 4, 2017. He was promoted back to the active roster on October 7, 2017. On October 8, 2017, against the Cleveland Browns, he recovered a fumble.

On June 7, 2018, Bishop was waived by the Jets.

=== Detroit Lions (second stint) ===
On July 23, 2018, Bishop signed with the Lions. He was waived on September 1, 2018.

=== Memphis Express ===
Bishop signed with the Memphis Express of the Alliance of American Football on February 27, 2019.

=== Toronto Argonauts ===
After the AAF ceased operations in April 2019, Bishop signed with the Toronto Argonauts on May 22, 2019.

=== Saskatchewan Roughriders ===
Bishop signed with the Saskatchewan Roughriders on December 29, 2020. On July 8, 2021, Bishop tore his Achilles' tendon in a workout ahead of training camp. He was placed on the injured list on July 14.
