= Exeter Township, Michigan =

- Civil township
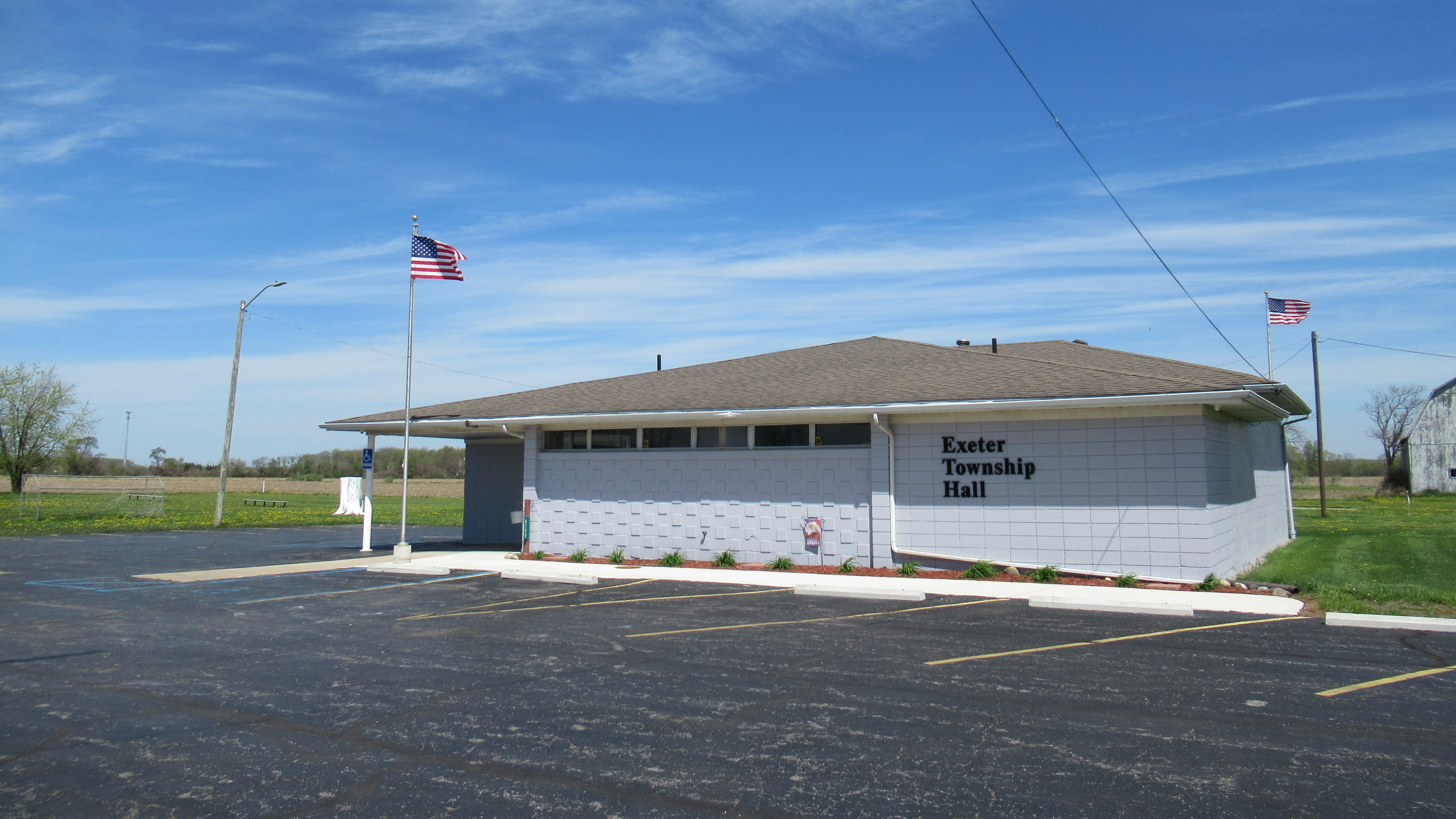
- Exeter Township Hall in Scofield

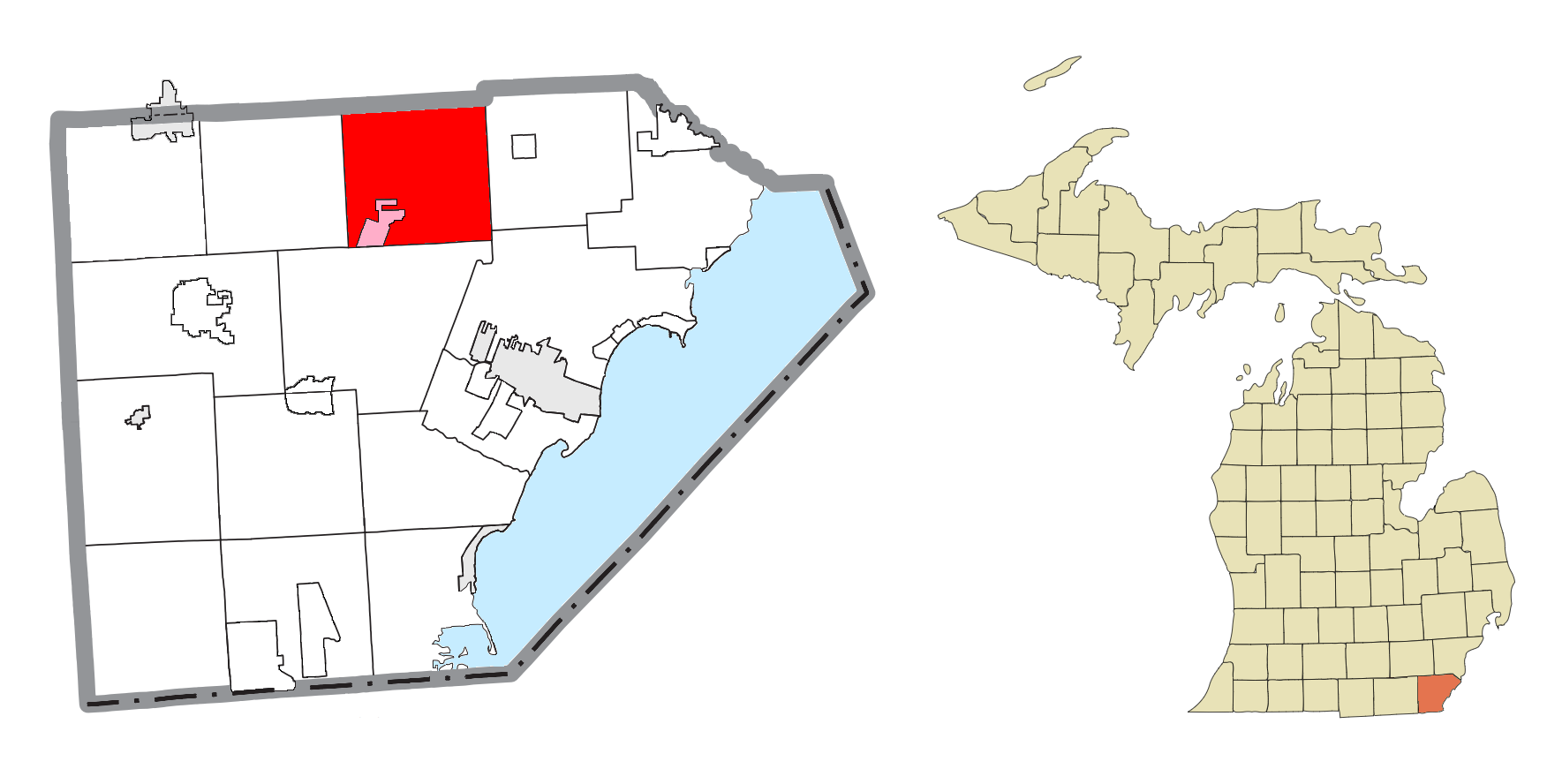
- Left: Location within Monroe County (red) and the administered village of Maybee (pink); Right: Location within the state of Michigan

- Location within Michigan Location within the United States
- Coordinates: 42°02′06″N 83°28′42″W
- Country: United States
- State: Michigan
- County: Monroe
- Organized: 1836

Government
  - Clerk: Christina Bogoski

Area
  - Total: 36.65 sq mi (94.9 km^{2})
  - Land: 36.54 sq mi (94.6 km^{2})
  - Water: 0.11 sq mi (0.28 km^{2})
- Elevation: 633 ft (193 m)

Population (2020)
  - Total: 3,927
  - Density: 107.5/sq mi (41.5/km^{2})
- Time zone: UTC-5 (Eastern (EST))
  - Summer (DST): UTC-4 (EDT)
- ZIP Codes: 48117 (Carleton); 48159 (Maybee); 48162 (Monroe); 48111 (Belleville); 48164 (New Boston)
- Area code: 734
- FIPS code: 26-115-26880
- GNIS feature ID: 1626261
- Website: www.exetertwp.com

Exeter Township Hall
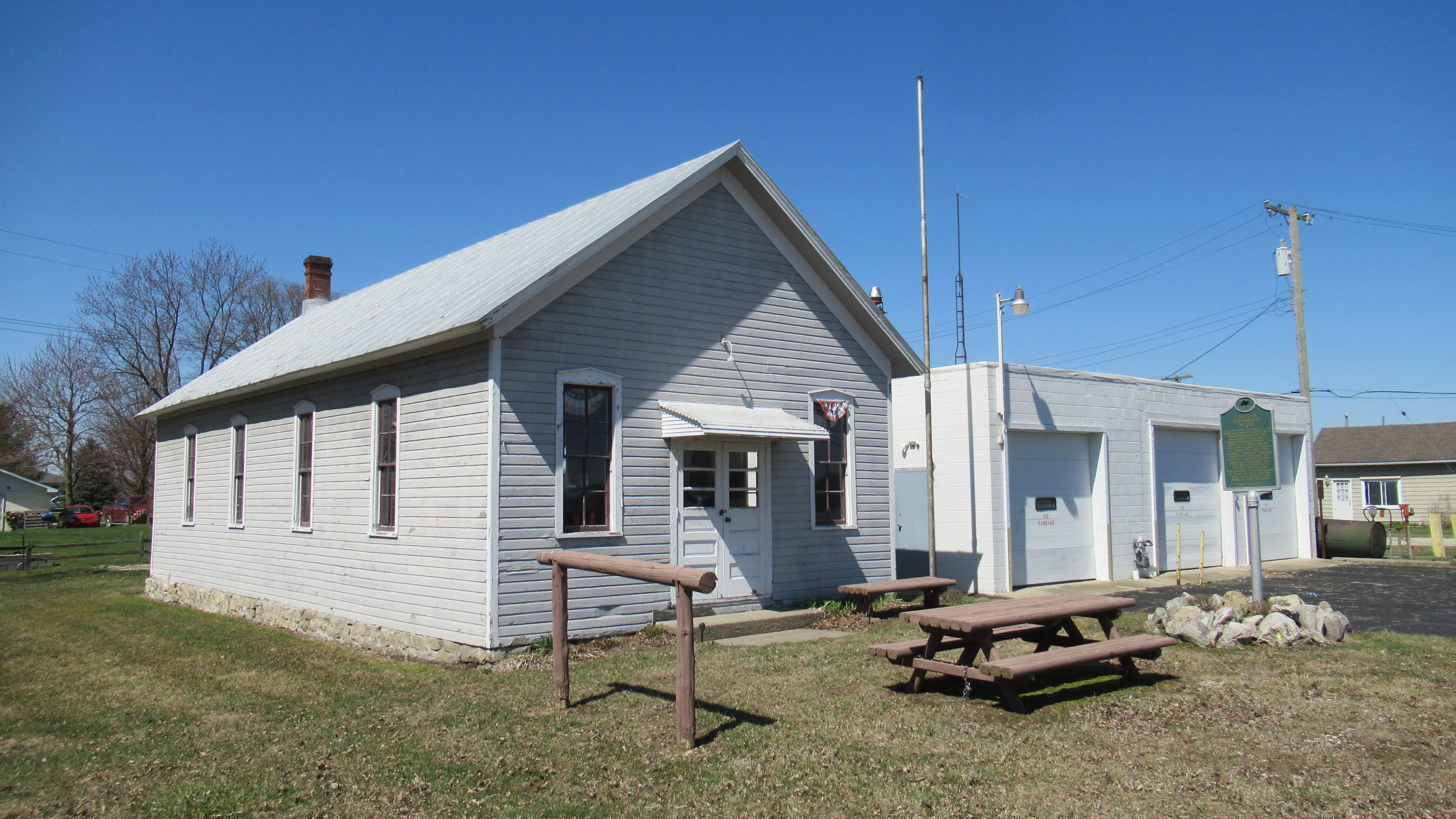
- Interactive map of Exeter Township Hall
- 42.0230°N 83.4798°W
- Location: Southwest corner of Sumpter Road and Grant Street

History
- Built: 1890

Michigan State Historic Site
- Designated: September 3, 1998

Exeter Township is a civil township of Monroe County in the U.S. state of Michigan. The population was 3,927 at the 2020 census.

== Communities ==
- East Exeter is a former settlement within the township that briefly had its own post office from March 14, 1850, until October 2, 1851.
- Exeter is a historic community located at 42°02′48″N 83°29′58″W. Exeter contained its own post office from July 6, 1840, to June 28, 1842, and again from March 14, 1850 to September 14, 1903.
- Maybee is a village in the southwestern portion of the township at 42°00′14″N 83°30′56″W. Maybee has its own post office with the 48159 ZIP Code, which serves the village and portions of Exeter Township, as well as portions of several nearby townships.
- Scofield is an unincorporated community located northeast of Maybee at 42°01′17″N 83°28′55″W.

== Geography ==
Exeter Township is in northern Monroe County and is bordered to the north by Wayne County. The center of the township is 10 miles (16 km) northwest of Monroe, the county seat.

According to the United States Census Bureau, the township has a total area of 36.65 square miles (94.92 km^{2}), of which 36.54 square miles (94.64 km^{2}) are land and 0.11 square miles (0.28 km^{2}), or 0.31%, are water. The township is drained mainly by Stony Creek, which crosses the center of the township, and Swan Creek, which crosses the northeast part of the township. Sandy Creek crosses the southwest corner of the township, passing through the center of the village of Maybee. All three creeks flow to the southeast and are direct tributaries of Lake Erie.

== Demographics ==
Historical population
Census	Pop.	Note	%±
1850	458		—
1860	832		81.7%
1870	1,067		28.2%
1880	1,822		70.8%
1890	1,716		−5.8%
1900	1,696		−1.2%
1910	1,550		−8.6%
1920	1,558		0.5%
1930	1,579		1.3%
1940	1,785		13.0%
1950	2,100		17.6%
1960	2,518		19.9%
1970	2,971		18.0%
1980	3,236		8.9%
1990	3,253		0.5%
2000	3,727		14.6%
2010	3,968		6.5%
2020	3,927		−1.0%
U.S. Decennial Census

As of the census of 2000, there were 3,727 people, 1,262 households, and 1,004 families residing in the township. The population density was 102.0 inhabitants per square mile (39.4/km^{2}). There were 1,307 housing units at an average density of 35.8 per square mile (13.8/km^{2}). The racial makeup of the township was 91.82% White, 6.14% African American, 0.30% Native American, 0.38% Asian, 0.03% Pacific Islander, 0.40% from other races, and 0.94% from two or more races. Hispanic or Latino of any race were 0.94% of the population.

There were 1,262 households, out of which 37.1% had children under the age of 18 living with them, 68.8% were married couples living together, 6.7% had a female householder with no husband present, and 20.4% were non-families. 16.2% of all households were made up of individuals, and 5.6% had someone living alone who was 65 years of age or older. The average household size was 2.95 and the average family size was 3.33.

In the township the population was spread out, with 27.7% under the age of 18, 8.1% from 18 to 24, 31.1% from 25 to 44, 23.5% from 45 to 64, and 9.6% who were 65 years of age or older. The median age was 36 years. For every 100 females, there were 104.7 males. For every 100 females age 18 and over, there were 105.8 males.

The median income for a household in the township was $63,806, and the median income for a family was $69,429. Males had a median income of $50,718 versus $26,818 for females. The per capita income for the township was $24,308. About 2.7% of families and 4.8% of the population were below the poverty line, including 8.1% of those under age 18 and 5.0% of those age 65 or over.

== Education ==
Exeter Township is served by four school districts. The majority of the township is served by Airport Community Schools. The southeastern portion of the township is served by Monroe Public Schools, which also includes the majority of the village of Maybee. The southwestern corner of the township, including a small western portion of the village of Maybee, is served by Dundee Community Schools. The northwestern portion of the township is served by Milan Area Schools.

== Notable people ==
- Lewis Welch (1814–1878), Michigan state senator

== Images ==
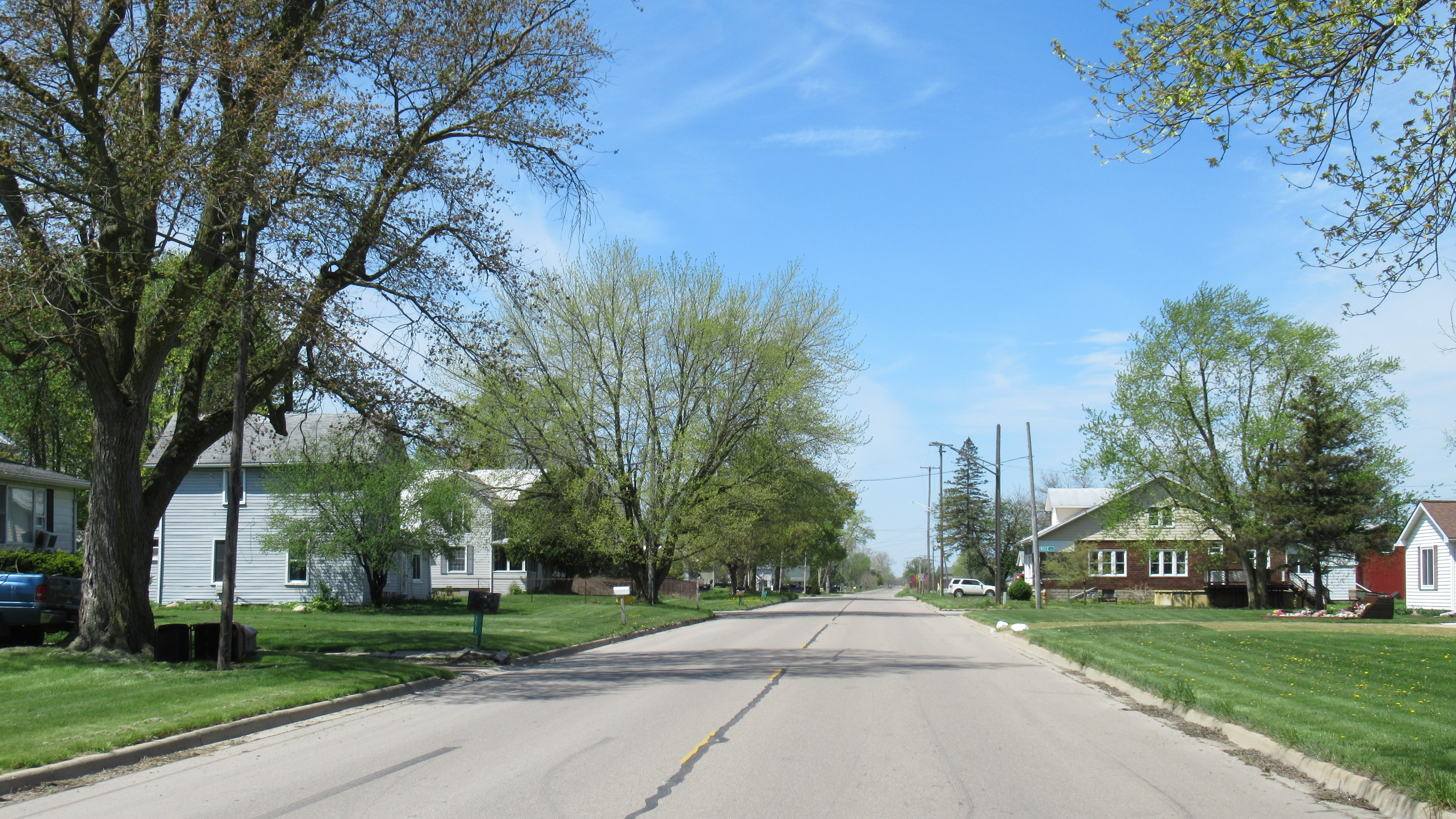
Unincorporated community of Scofield

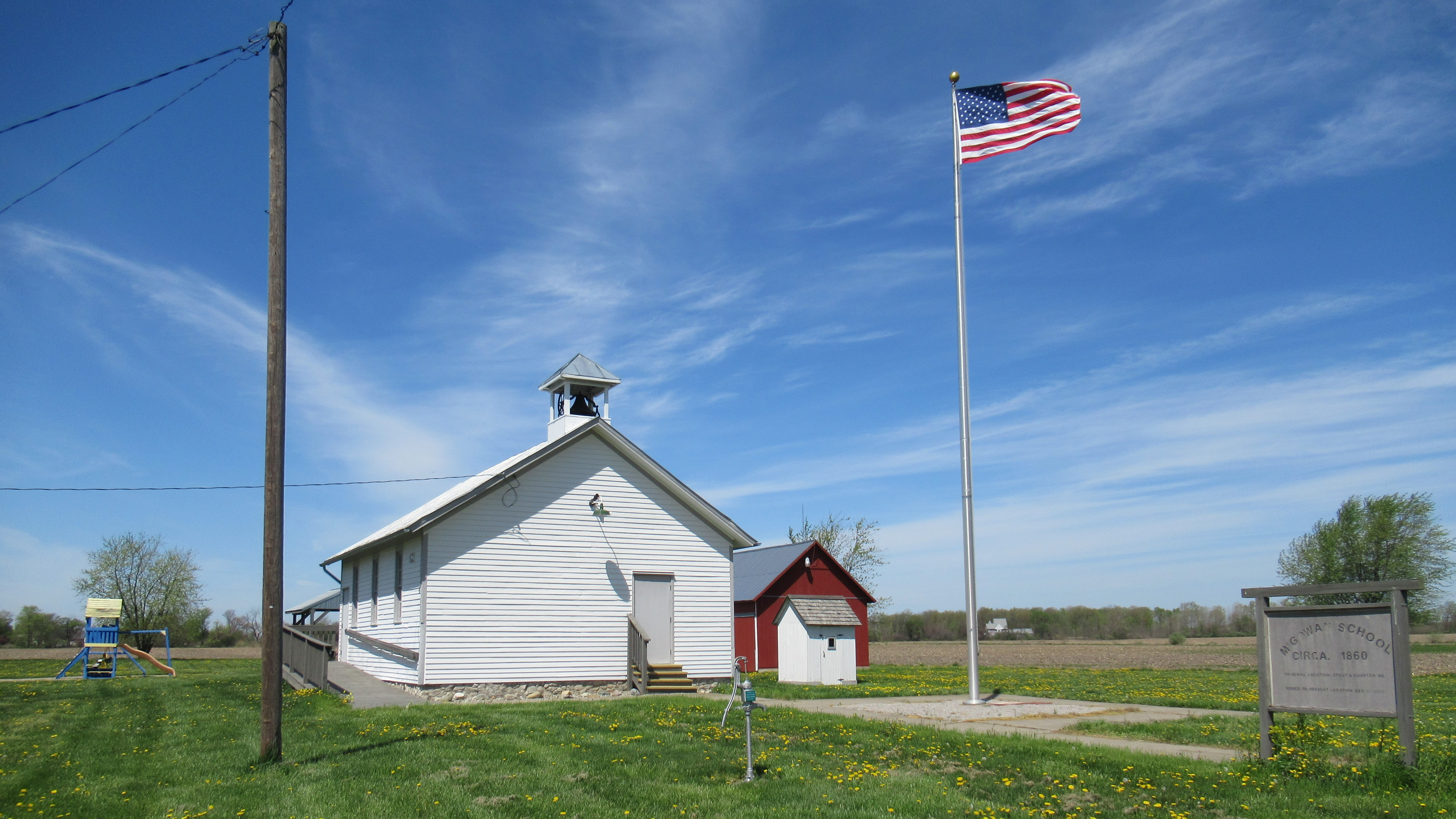
McGowan School, built c. 1860

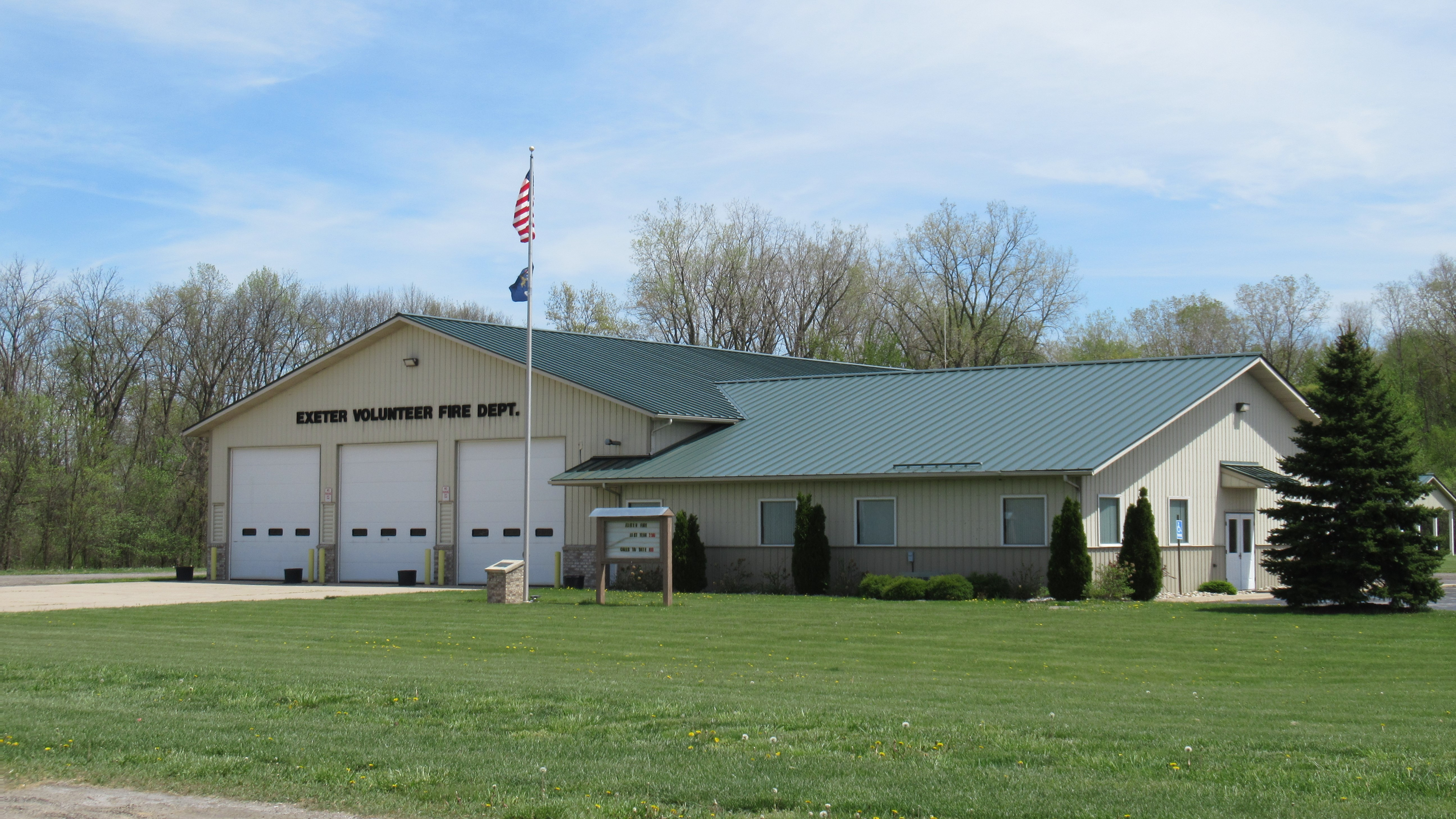
Volunteer fire department
