= Maybee, Michigan =

- Village
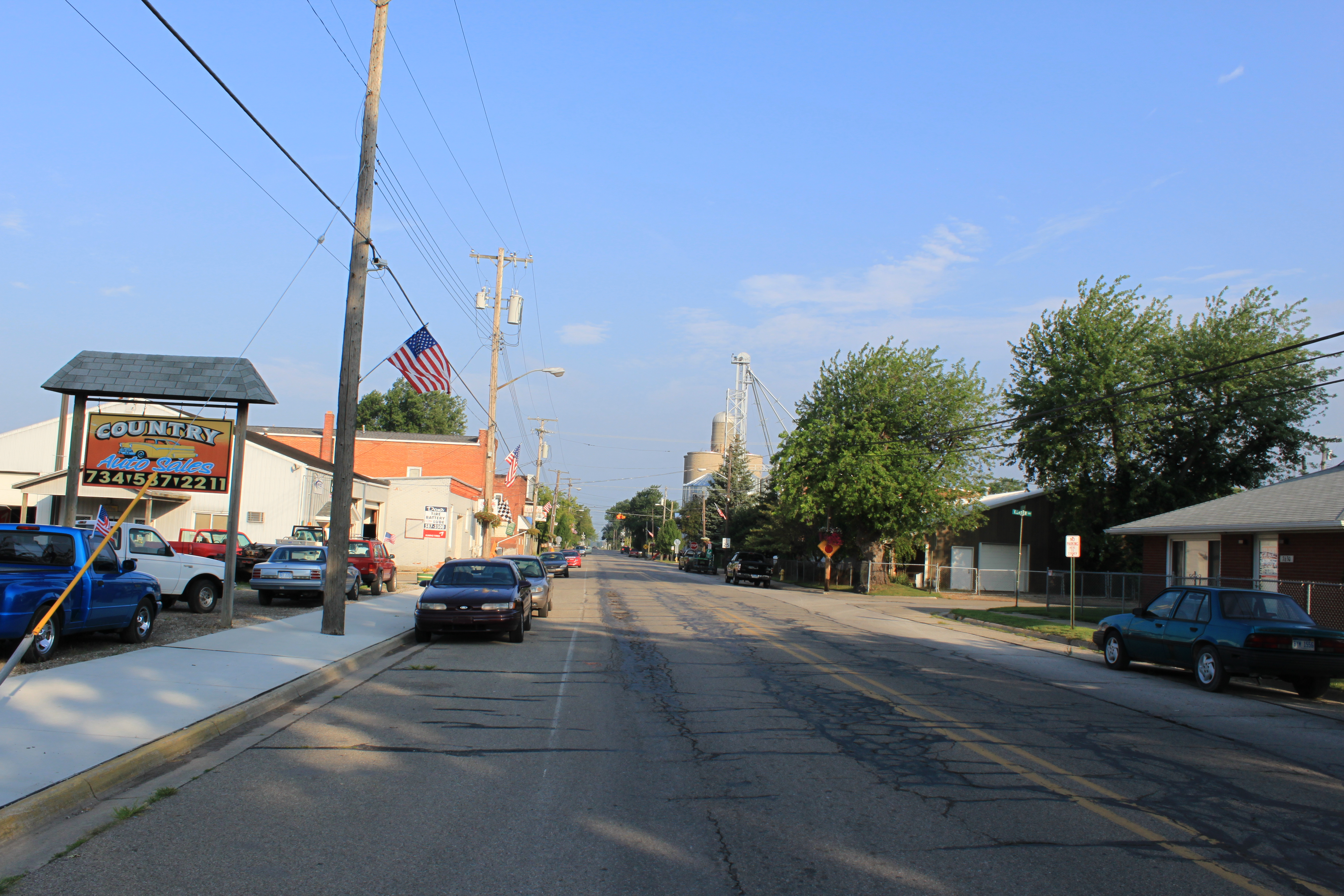
- Looking east along Bluebush Road
- Motto: "The Best Little Town in Michigan"
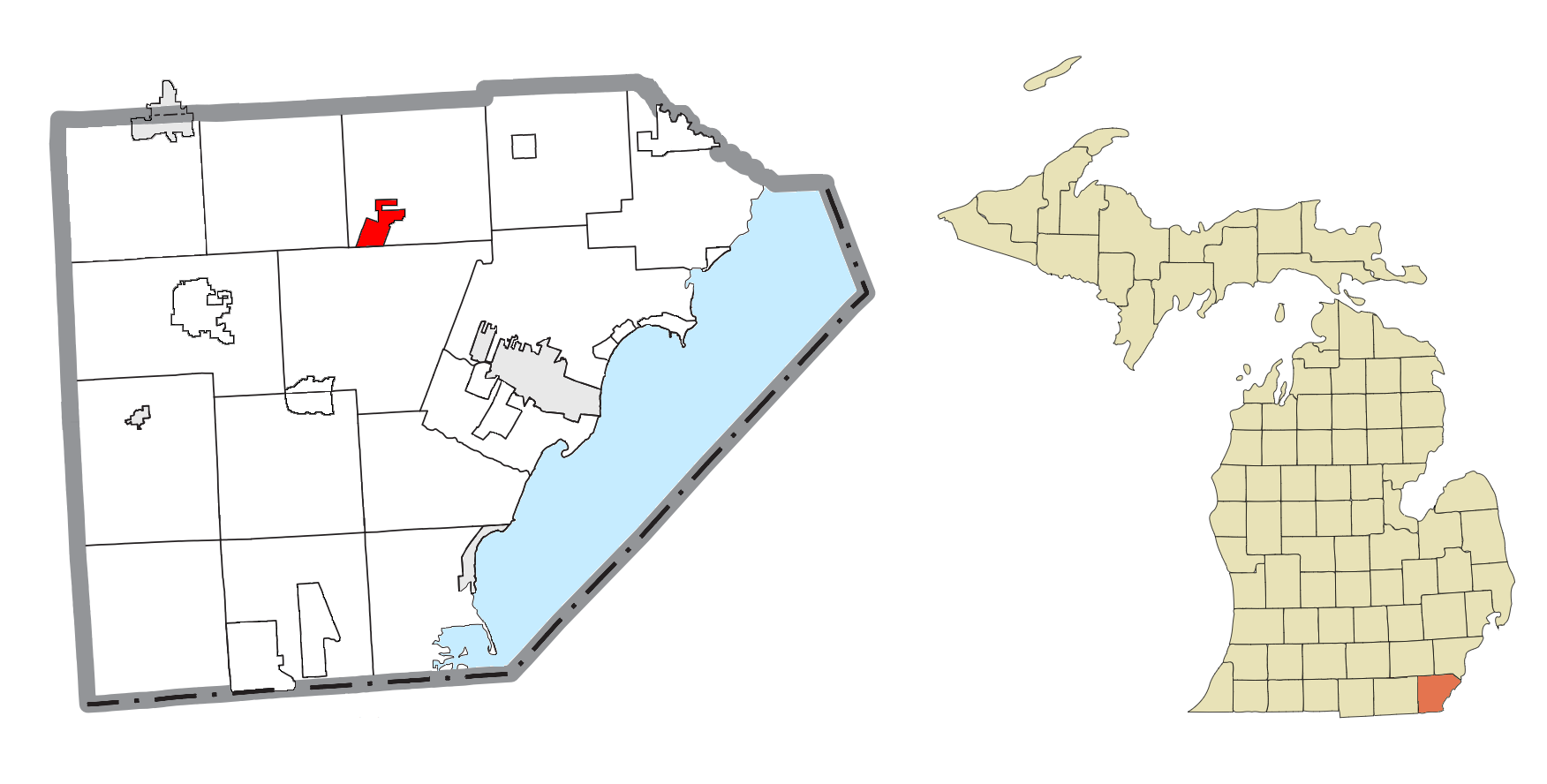
- Location within Monroe County and the state of Michigan

- Location within Michigan Location within the United States
- Coordinates: 42°00′14″N 83°30′56″W
- Country: United States
- State: Michigan
- County: Monroe
- Township: Exeter
- Established: 1873
- Incorporated: 1899

Government
  - Type: Village council
  - President: Joel Grubb
  - Clerk: Kate Napier

Area
  - Total: 1.86 sq mi (4.82 km^{2})
  - Land: 1.84 sq mi (4.77 km^{2})
  - Water: 0.019 sq mi (0.05 km^{2})
- Elevation: 636 ft (194 m)

Population (2020)
  - Total: 545
  - Density: 295.5/sq mi (114.11/km^{2})
- Time zone: UTC-5 (Eastern (EST))
  - Summer (DST): UTC-4 (EDT)
- ZIP Codes: 48159; 48162 (Monroe)
- Area code: 734
- FIPS code: 26-52440
- GNIS feature ID: 631766
- Website: maybeevillage.com

Maybee (/meɪˈbiː/ may-BEE) is a village in Monroe County in the U.S. state of Michigan. The population was 545 at the 2020 census. The village is located within Exeter Township. Maybee was established in 1873 and incorporated as a village in 1899.

== History ==
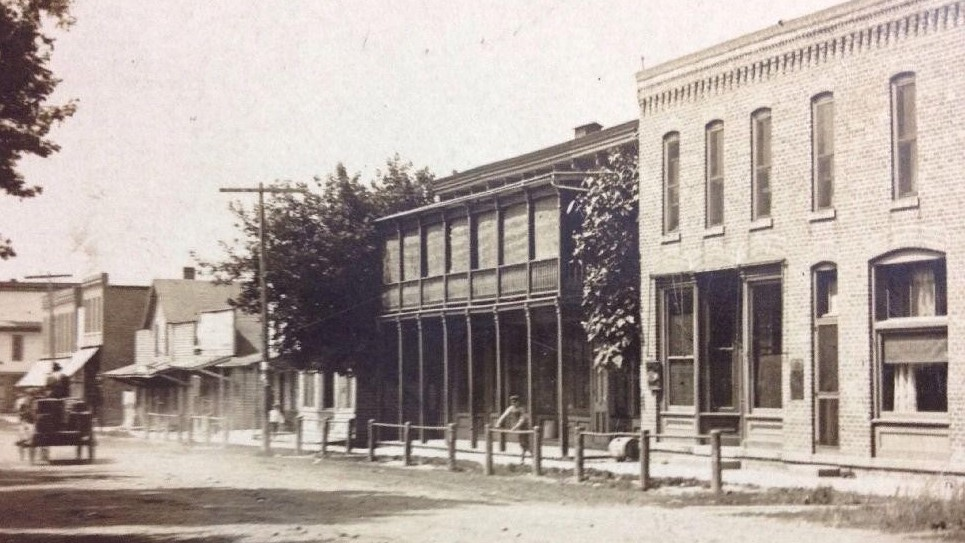
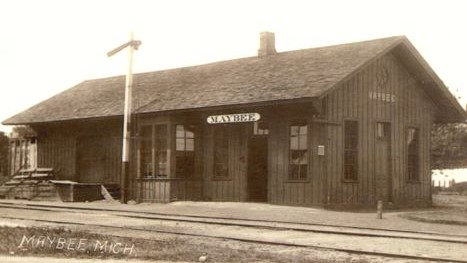
Main Street in 1910 (top) and the former Maybee Station (bottom)

Maybee was established as early as 1873 in the southwest part of Exeter Township when the Canada Southern Railway built a railway line through the area. The line was soon transferred to the Detroit, Toledo and Ironton Railroad, which transported manufactured charcoal and other forest products from Maybee to Detroit in the northeast and Ohio to the south. The community was named for early settler Abram Maybee. Along with Joseph Klotz, the two surveyed, platted, and bought and sold the land by 1875. The village grew to include a grain elevator, gristmill, mining quarry and sand pit, hotel, several churches and schools, and numerous small factories and stores. The growing population led to Maybee becoming incorporated as a village in 1899.

The Maybee Station no longer exists, but the railway line continues to run through the village. The line is currently operated by the Canadian National Railway but no longer contains a station at this point along its route.

Maybee received its first post office on February 24, 1874. This post office was discontinued on February 3, 1972. Another post office was established on August 1, 1903, and this office remains in operation and is currently located at 7580 Mill Street.

The London–Maybee–Raisinville Volunteer Fire Department was formed in 1952 and serves the village and surrounding area. The station is located at 8755 Baldwin Road in the southwest corner of the village.

The village of Maybee contains two active cemeteries along Raisin Street. The Northside Cemetery and Saint Joseph Cemetery are located within the village boundaries. The North Side Cemetery contains graves dating back to 1876, while the Saint Joseph Cemetery has graves dating back to 1871.

The village boundaries remained the same from 1899 until 2013 when the village acquired 546 acres (2.21 km^{2}) of land belonging to the Stoneco Quarry just north of the village. The current village offices are located at 9043 Raisin Street, which is next to the Maybee Village Hall. The historic hall was first constructed in 1912 and housed the village government offices and fire station until 1977. The structure was listed as a Michigan State Historic Site on March 15, 1988. The building has been used since March 2021 as a sheriff substation for the Monroe County Police Department.

== Geography ==
Maybee is in rural northern Monroe County, in the southwest part of Exeter Township. It is 10 miles (16 km) northwest of Monroe, the county seat, and 9 miles (14 km) northeast of Dundee. According to the U.S. Census Bureau, the village has a total area of 1.86 square miles (4.82 km^{2}), of which 1.84 square miles (4.77 km^{2}) are land and 0.012 square miles (0.03 km^{2}), or 0.65%, are water.

The Robert Drain flows through the northern portion of the village and provides drainage into Stony Creek. The Antes Drain flows through the southern portion of the village and connects to Sandy Creek, which also flows through the village. Stony Creek and Sandy Creek are each direct tributaries of Lake Erie.

Maybee has its own post office with the 48159 ZIP Code. The Maybee post office serves a much larger area, including portions of Exeter Township, London Township, Milan Township, and very small portions of Dundee Township and Raisinville Township. The southwestern portion of the village uses the Monroe 48162 ZIP Code.

Other nearby villages include Carleton to the northeast and Dundee to the southwest. Maybee is about halfway between the cities of Milan to the northwest and Monroe to the southeast. The unincorporated community of Scofield is about one mile (1.6 km) to the northeast within Exeter Township.

== Education ==
There are no schools located within Maybee. Although the village is relatively small, it is served by two separate school districts. The majority of the village is served by Monroe Public Schools in the far northwest corner of the district's boundaries. A small portion of the village west of Baldwin Road is served by Dundee Community Schools at the easternmost point of the district's boundaries.

== Demographics ==
Historical population
Census	Pop.	Note	%±
1880	200		—
1910	310		—
1920	290		−6.5%
1930	346		19.3%
1940	390		12.7%
1950	428		9.7%
1960	459		7.2%
1970	485		5.7%
1980	490		1.0%
1990	500		2.0%
2000	505		1.0%
2010	562		11.3%
2020	545		−3.0%
U.S. Decennial Census

=== 2010 census ===
As of the census of 2010, there were 562 people, 205 households, and 154 families living in the village. The population density was 562.0 inhabitants per square mile (217.0/km^{2}). There were 223 housing units at an average density of 223.0 per square mile (86.1/km^{2}). The racial makeup of the village was 96.6% White, 1.4% African American, 0.5% Native American, 0.4% Asian, 0.4% from other races, and 0.7% from two or more races. Hispanic or Latino of any race were 1.8% of the population.

There were 205 households, of which 42.0% had children under the age of 18 living with them, 59.0% were married couples living together, 13.2% had a female householder with no husband present, 2.9% had a male householder with no wife present, and 24.9% were non-families. 22.0% of all households were made up of individuals, and 5.3% had someone living alone who was 65 years of age or older. The average household size was 2.74 and the average family size was 3.23.

The median age in the village was 34.9 years. 31% of residents were under the age of 18; 5.3% were between the ages of 18 and 24; 26.9% were from 25 to 44; 30.9% were from 45 to 64; and 5.9% were 65 years of age or older. The gender makeup of the village was 49.8% male and 50.2% female.

=== 2000 census ===
As of the census of 2000, there were 505 people, 170 households, and 126 families living in the village. The population density was 432.3 inhabitants per square mile (166.9/km^{2}). There were 184 housing units at an average density of 157.5 per square mile (60.8/km^{2}). The racial makeup of the village was 98.42% White, 0.40% African American, 0.20% Pacific Islander, 0.59% from other races, and 0.40% from two or more races. Hispanic or Latino of any race were 1.78% of the population.

There were 170 households, out of which 42.9% had children under the age of 18 living with them, 55.9% were married couples living together, 11.8% had a female householder with no husband present, and 25.3% were non-families. 18.8% of all households were made up of individuals, and 4.7% had someone living alone who was 65 years of age or older. The average household size was 2.96 and the average family size was 3.42.

In the village, the population was spread out, with 31.1% under the age of 18, 11.1% from 18 to 24, 34.1% from 25 to 44, 17.8% from 45 to 64, and 5.9% who were 65 years of age or older. The median age was 31 years. For every 100 females, there were 114.0 males. For every 100 females age 18 and over, there were 118.9 males.

The median income for a household in the village was $50,962, and the median income for a family was $60,000. Males had a median income of $42,386 versus $23,929 for females. The per capita income for the village was $18,716. About 2.4% of families and 4.4% of the population were below the poverty line, including 3.2% of those under age 18 and 3.2% of those age 65 or over.

== Images ==
Maybee Village Hall
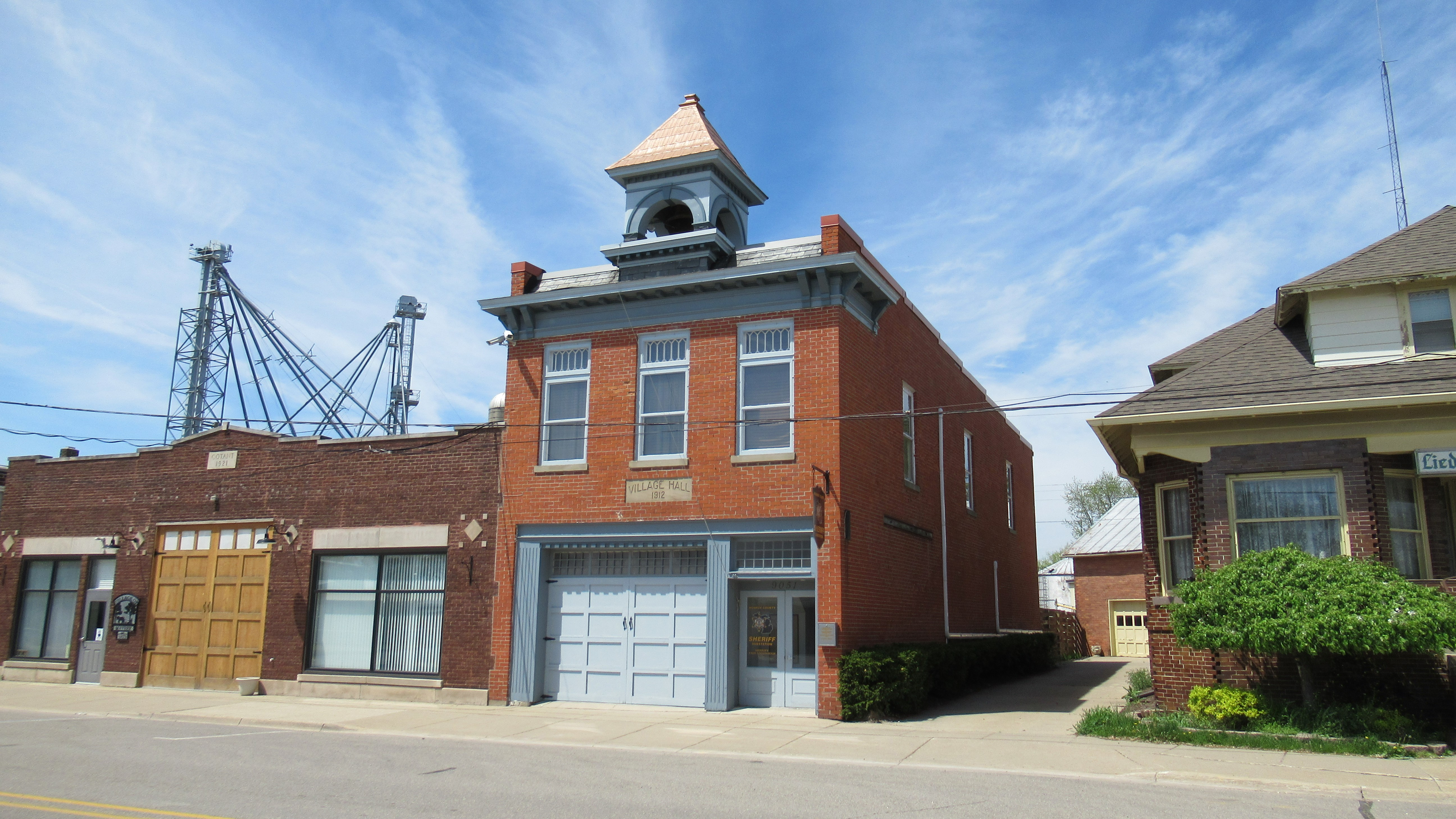
- Interactive map of Maybee Village Hall
- 42°00′17″N 83°30′56″W
- Location: 9051 Raisin Street

History
- Built: 1912

Michigan State Historic Site
- Designated: March 15, 1988

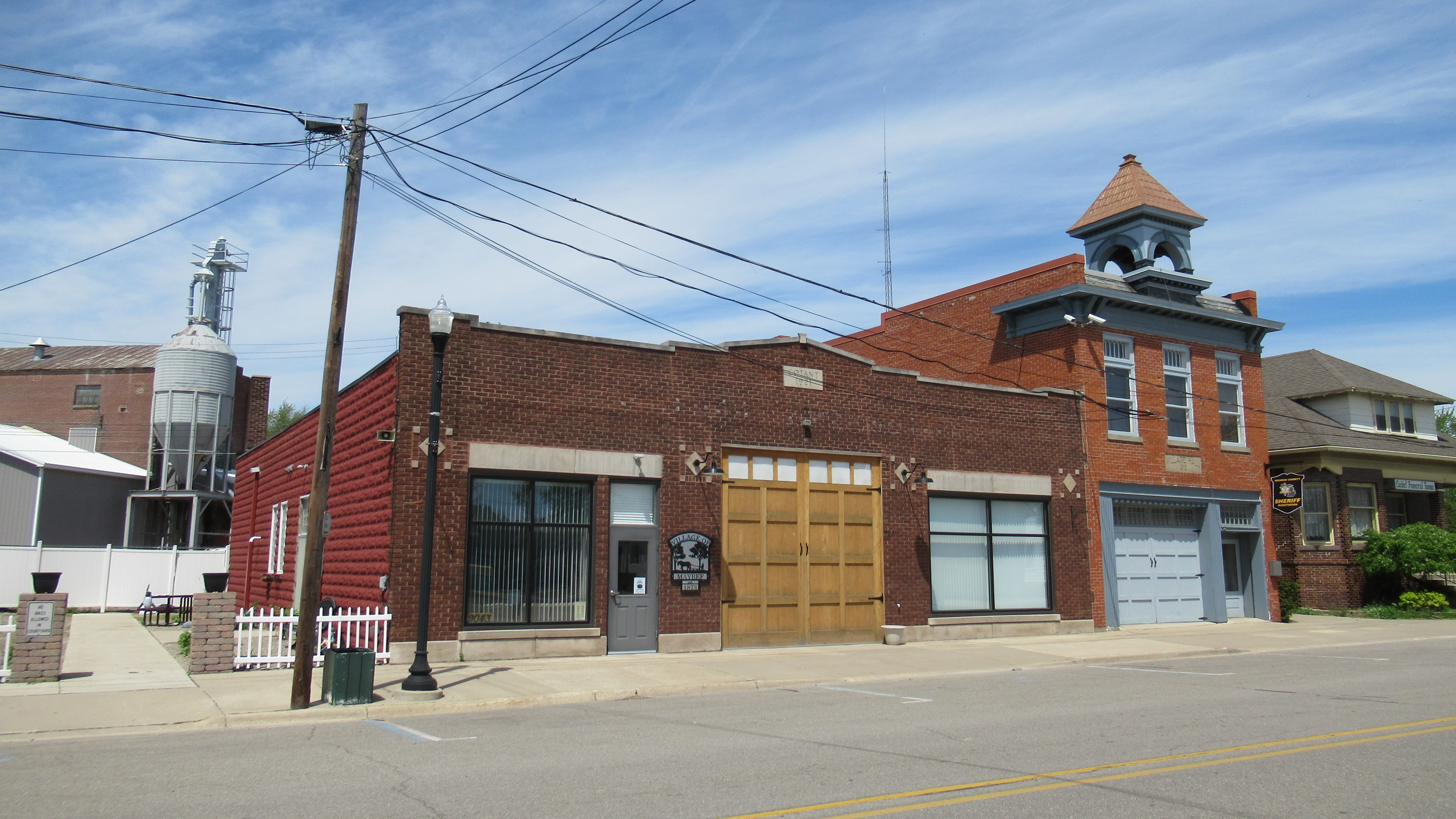
Current village hall

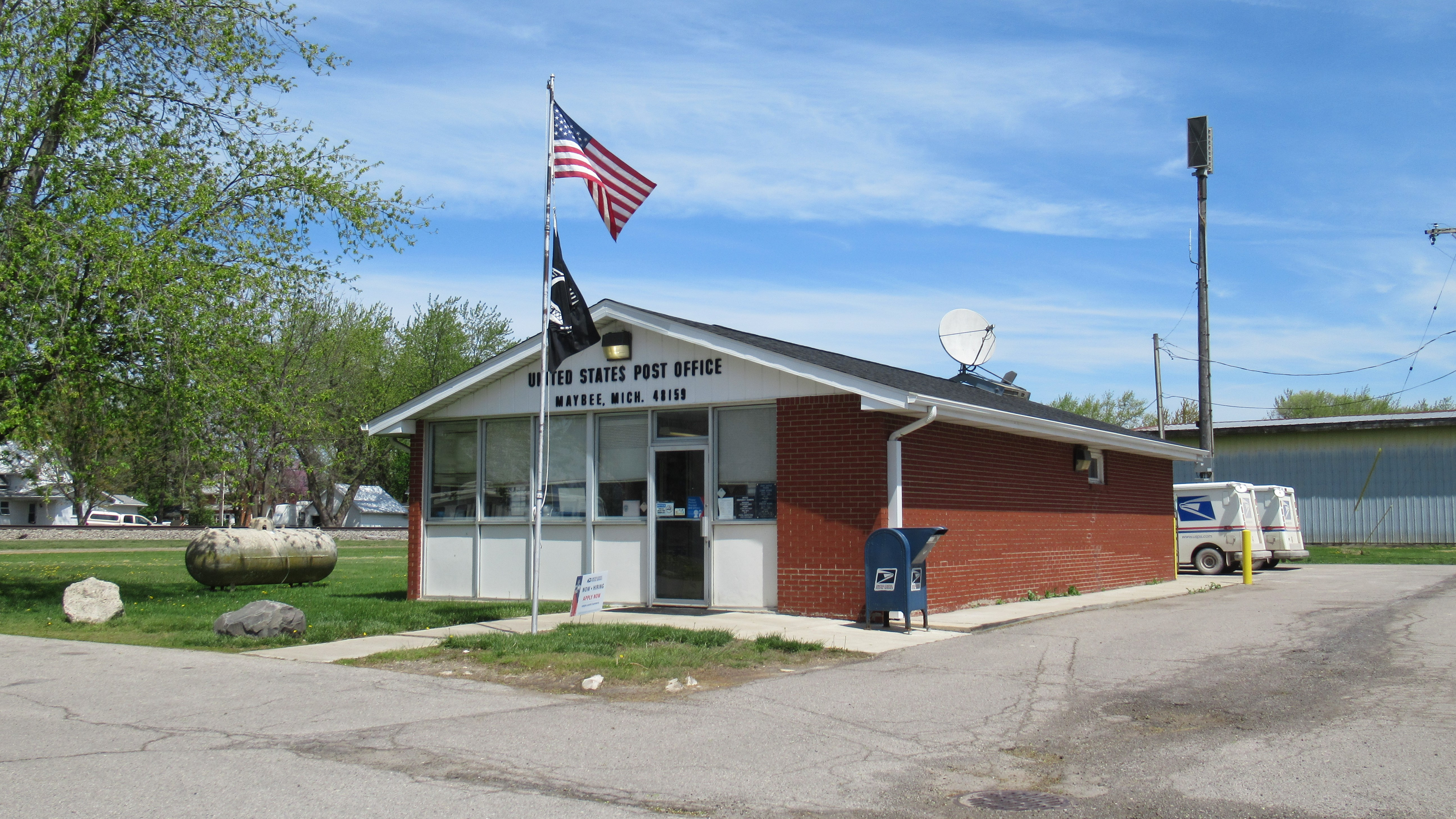
U.S. post office in Maybee

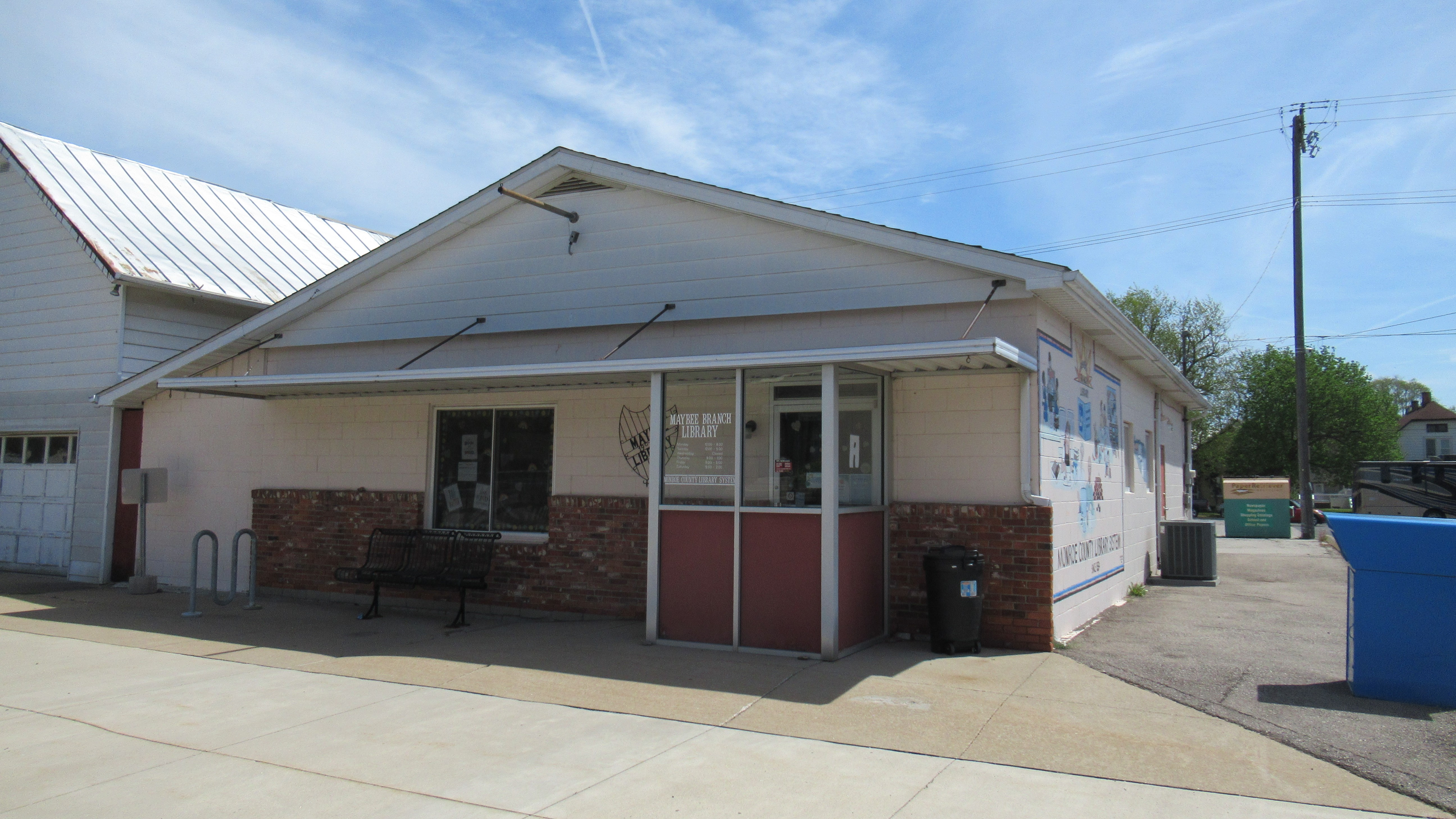
Monroe County Library branch in Maybee

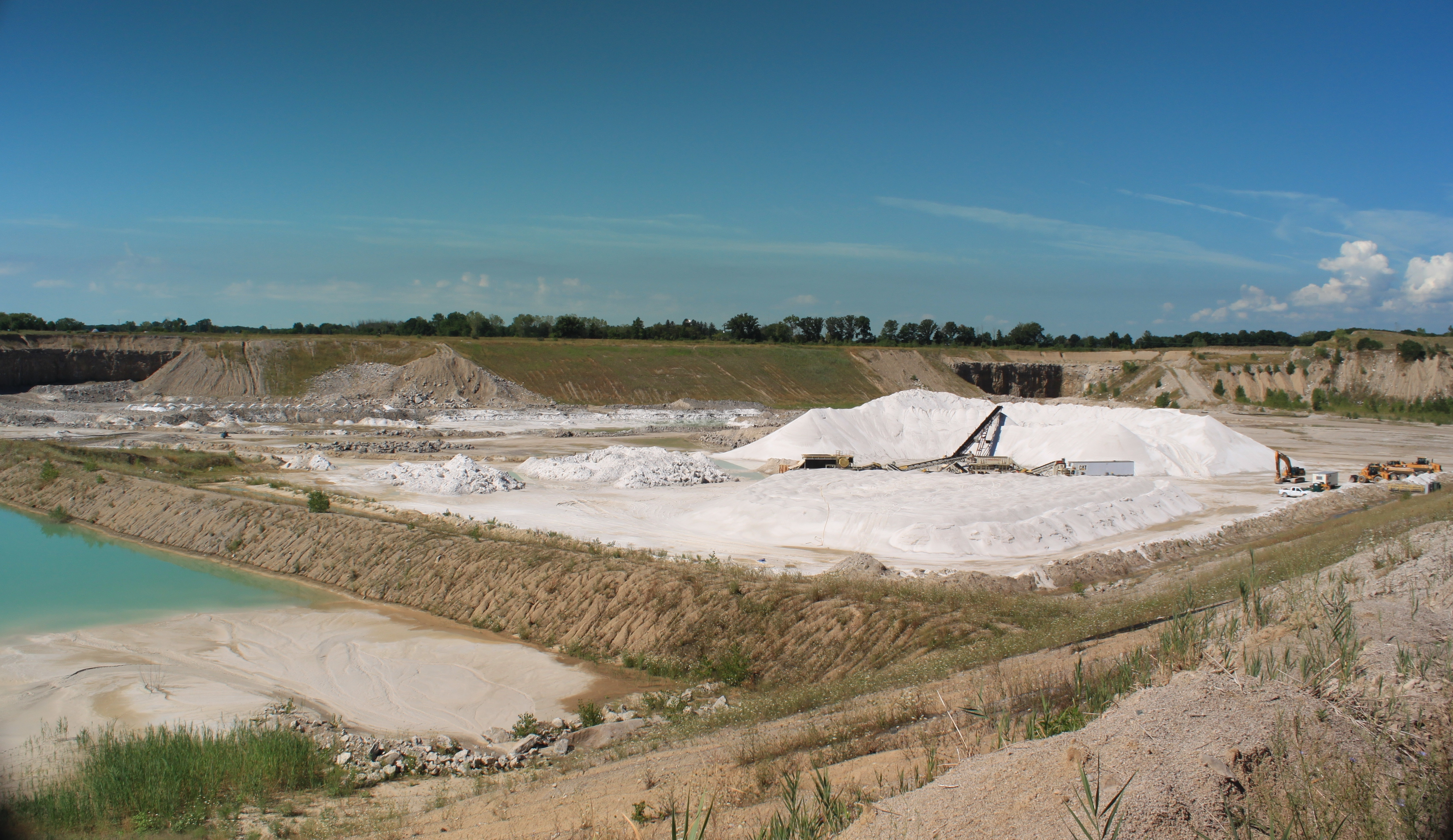
Stoneco Quarry
