= Airport High School =

Airport High School may refer to:

- Airport High School (Michigan)
- Airport High School (South Carolina)
