= Monroe Public Schools (Michigan) =

School district in Michigan

Address
- 1275 N. Macomb St. Monroe, Monroe County, Michigan, 48162; United States
- Coordinates: 41°55′56″N 83°23′10″W

District information
- Motto: Where your child succeeds
- Grades: Pre-Kindergarten-12
- Superintendent: Andrew Shaw
- Schools: 8
- Budget: $95,996,000 2022-2023 expenditures
- NCES District ID: 2624150

Students and staff
- Students: 4,428 (2024-2025)
- Teachers: 237.0 (on an FTE basis) (2024-2025)
- Staff: 745.38 FTE (2024-2025)
- Student–teacher ratio: 18.68 (2024-2025)

Other information
- Website: www.monroe.k12.mi.us

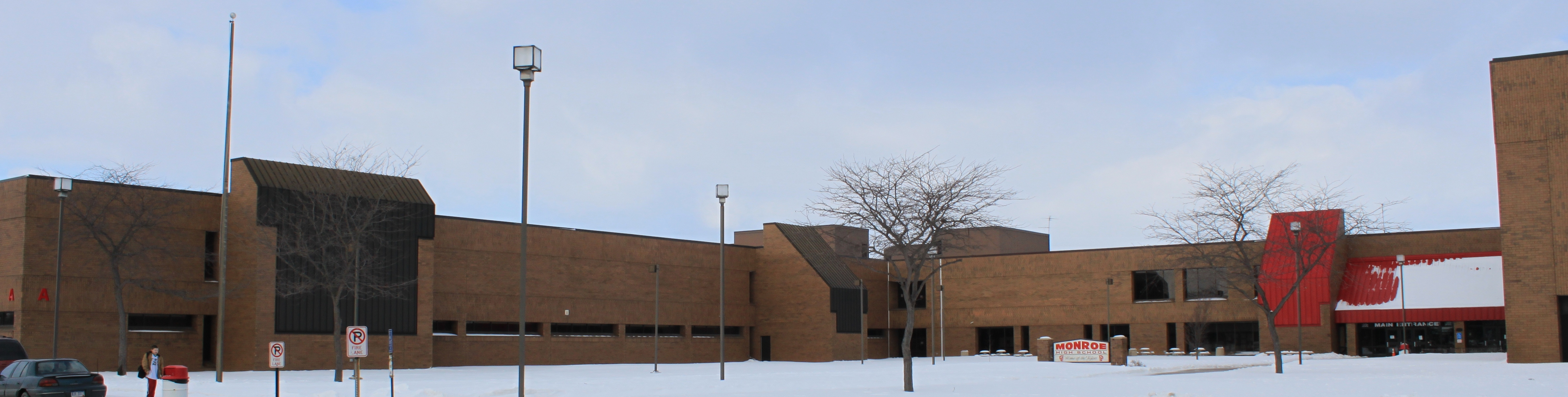
Monroe High School

Monroe Public Schools is a public school district in Monroe County, Michigan. It serves Monroe and parts of Maybee, Exeter Township, Frenchtown Township, LaSalle Township, Monroe Township, and Raisinville Township.

== History ==
Monroe Public Schools is rooted in a union school district established in 1858. That year, a central school building was built in town that held all grades. In 1888, a separate high school building was built. In 1912, the district built a new high school on the block between Cass, Third, Fourth, and Harrison Streets. That school was replaced in 1928 with a new building, which became known as Monroe Middle School in 1975 with the opening of the current high school. The 1912 high school became Boyd Elementary in 1928, and it was demolished in 1971.

== Schools ==
Schools in Monroe Public Schools District
School	Address	Notes
Hollywood Elementary	1135 Riverview Avenue, Monroe	
Cantrick	1135 Riverview Avenue, Monroe	Grades 5-6
Custer Elementary	5003 West Albain Road, Monroe	
Manor Elementary	1731 West Lorain Street, Monroe	
Raisinville Elementary	2300 North Raisinville Road, Monroe	
Waterloo Elementary	1933 South Custer Road, Monroe	
Monroe Middle School	503 Washington Street, Monroe	Grades 7-8. Built 1928.
Monroe High School	901 Herr Road, Monroe	Grades 9-12
Orchard Center High School	1750 Oak St., Monroe	Alternative school, grades 7-12
Riverside Learning Center	77 N. Roessler St., Monroe	Preschool and childcare
