= Elmina R. Lucke =

American educator and social worker

- Born: Elmina Rose Lucke; December 6, 1889; Carleton, Michigan
- Died: October 31, 1987 (aged 97); Sarasota, Florida
- Occupations: educator, Social worker
- Years active: 1912-1969
- Known for: establishing the first master's degree program for social work in Asia

Elmina Rose Lucke (December 6, 1889 – October 31, 1987) was an American educator, social worker and international relations expert. After graduating from Oberlin College, she taught high school in Ohio and worked on social service projects before earning her doctorate in International Law and Relations from Columbia University. From 1927 to 1946, she taught at the Teachers College of Columbia making numerous trips abroad to study social work. In 1946, she moved to India to found the first master's degree program in Asia and second school of social work in the country, serving as its director for the next three years. Between 1950 and 1955, she served as a consultant to social work schools in Cairo, Egypt and Pakistan. From 1959 to 1965, she served as a delegate to the United Nations for various women's groups, presenting proposals on issues which impacted women. She was honored by the United Nations for her work in international relations in 1975 and was inducted into the Michigan Women's Hall of Fame in 1986.

== Early life ==
Elmina Rose Lucke was born on December 6, 1889, in Carleton, Michigan to Carrie (née Strait) and Jacob J. Lucke. Both of Lucke's parents were second generation German immigrants, whose families had been granted land bordering the Western Reserve in lower Michigan. Her father was a cattleman and livestock trader, while her mother raised Lucke and her younger brother, Ralph, encouraging them in their education. Elmina, named after a character in the book John Bull, Uncle Sam and Johnny Crapaud began her education in a one-room schoolhouse before completing her high school education at Central High School in Toledo, Ohio, in 1908. Lucke initially began her quest for a university degree at Smith College, but after difficulties in the living and enrollment process, decided to attend Oberlin College, from where she graduated Phi Beta Kappa in 1912.

== Career ==
Upon completion of her studies, Lucke returned to Carleton and helped found the first high school in the village, before enrolling in the University of Berlin to continue her education. Her graduate study award was eliminated because of the outbreak of World War I and Lucke returned to the states in 1914. Between 1914 and 1917, she worked as a high school teacher at Scott High School in Toledo. Beginning in 1917, Lucke was employed in several governmental social service posts, working as a director of services for the United States Children's Bureau of Gary, Indiana, and the Bureau of Labor Statistics as a social research surveyor in Kansas and Oklahoma through 1919. Simultaneously, she attended courses at the University of Chicago in social work.

Under the auspices of the National Board of the YWCA, Lucke founded the Detroit International Institute in 1919. The organization aimed to provide social services to the half-million recent immigrants in the Detroit metropolitan area. Lucke served as the director for the first five years of the Institute's history, hiring staff speaking the 27 different languages necessary to communicate with their clients. She then returned to teaching high school in 1923. Based on her experience in international relations, she was accepted in 1926 to Columbia University's graduate program in International Law and Relations, as one of the first two women to enter the specialty. Earning her Master of Arts in 1927, Lucke was hired to teach at the Lincoln School of Teachers College, Columbia University, which also allowed her to pursue the research which she needed to complete a PhD. Between August 1930 and August 1931, Lucke traveled throughout Asia, conducting research and teaching which was enabled through funding provided by the American Historical Association. She returned to Columbia and taught until 1946. Simultaneously from 1937, she served on the national board of the American Council of Nationalities Service and was affiliated as an education consultant and social welfare advisor to the United Nations from its founding in 1945.

In 1946, Lucke took a sabbatical from Columbia at the request of the YWCA to found a graduate program for social work in India. At the time, there was one school of social work in India, located in Madras (now known as Chennai). The school's alumni, averaging about 40 graduates per year, were insufficient to provide sufficient service for the population and had to restrict their work to urban areas with high need. Lucke was hired as an advisor to develop a second school, which would also offer a master's program. For the first year, the school operated from Bombay (now Mumbai), visiting various regions to assess the needs throughout the country, speaking with those working in institutions, as well as conducting field work. On the eve of the country's Independence from Britain, the school, which had been intended to serve Burma (now Myanmar), Ceylon (now Sri Lanka) and India, found itself also serving Pakistan and dealing with rioting as they moved to the new facility in Delhi. Lucke remained in India until 1949, as director of the school which became affiliated with the University of Delhi, and the first school in Asia to grant master's degrees in social work.

In 1950, Lucke went to Cairo as a Fulbright Scholar to assist in developing social work schools. Simultaneously, she worked as a consultant to the Point Four Program, launched by President Truman, which provided technical support to developing nations. Between 1952 and 1954, she developed an educational curriculum for social work in Pakistan under the direction of the United Nations Technical Assistance Program. Returning to the United States in 1955, Lucke was appointed to the Lincoln School's Board of Trustees and the following year was granted a Doctor of humane letters degree from Oberlin College.

In 1959, the International Federation of University Women (IFUW) appointed Lucke as the organization's representative to the United Nations. In 1964, she served as a delegate of the IFUW to the Pan-Pacific and Southeast Asia Women's Association (PPSEAWA) Tonga Conference, and attended seminars in Brisbane and Melbourne. The following year, she was appointed by PPSEAWA as its delegate to the United Nations, attending the U.N. Conference on Women in Teheran, where she presented a draft on issues facing women. In 1969, she resigned from the American Council of Nationalities Service and attempted to retire in Florida. Lucke was honored by the United Nations in 1975, for her work which was "marked by a sensitivity to indigenous people and their culture and a deep understanding of social structures and issues". She was inducted into the Michigan Women's Hall of Fame in 1986 for her roles in developing international relations and social work. That same year, Unforgettable Memories, a book printed in India was published about her time in the country, as a diary of her experiences. Unsatisfied with the portrayal, her memoirs Remembering at eighty eight: Letters I should have written were published the following year.

== Death and legacy ==
Lucke died on October 31, 1987, in Sarasota, Florida. Her papers were donated to the Sophia Smith Collection, Women's History Archive at Smith College in Northampton, Massachusetts. Delhi School of Social Work has instituted an award in her memory which is awarded annually to the student who scores highest marks in Field Work practicum of Social Work curriculum at postgraduate level.
