= Battle of Elmina =

Battle of Elmina may refer to:

- Battle of Elmina (1625), during the Dutch-Portuguese War
- Battle of Elmina (1637), during the Dutch-Portuguese War
- Battle of Fort Elmina (1782), during the Fourth Anglo-Dutch War
