= Airport Community Schools =

School district in Michigan

Coordinates: 42°02′18″N 83°22′43″W

Location
- Carleton, Michigan United States

District information
- Type: Public
- Grades: PreK–12
- Superintendent: Ryan Duvall
- Schools: 9
- NCES District ID: 2601980

Students and staff
- Students: 2,701 (2021–22)
- Teachers: 149.05 (FTE)
- Student–teacher ratio: 18.12
- District mascot: Jets
- Colors: Navy blue and gold

Other information
- District area: 110 sq mi (280 km^{2})
- Website: airportschools.com

Airport Community Schools is a public school district in Carleton, Michigan, United States. It is the largest district in Monroe County by area. The districts includes the village of Carleton and the surrounding Ash Township, as well as portions of Frenchtown Charter, Exeter, and Berlin Charter townships. Airport Community Schools also includes a very small portion of Sumpter Township in neighboring Wayne County.

== Schools ==
=== Elementary schools ===
- Fred D. Ritter Elementary School
- Joseph C. Sterling Elementary School
- Loren Eyler Elementary School
- Henry Niedermeier Elementary School

=== Secondary schools ===
- Airport Senior High School
- Edith M. Wagar Middle School 5/6 and 7/8

== Board of education ==
The Airport Community Schools Board of Education consists of seven members, each elected to a term of six years, though this may be abbreviated to only four years at the board's discretion. Elections are held every two years, with members typically up for election in staggered groups, with two separate groups of two, and one group of three. Vacancies are filled by temporary appointment, with existing members selecting an individual to fill the vacancy until the next regular election, at which time that member may run to serve the remainder of the term.

The most recent election was held on Tuesday, November 5, 2024, in which two members were elected to six-year terms. On the ballot, a bond was proposed and voted on to fund numerous projects and address space and accessibility concerns, specifically at Wagar Middle & Junior High School, along with other campus needs. The bond was successful and construction began in the spring of 2026.

=== Membership ===
Officers are elected from within the board, typically during the same meeting at which new or re-elected members are sworn in.

President: Patrick Lewis

Vice President: Margaret Hoffman

Treasurer: Allen Burger

Secretary: Angie Ashcraft

Trustees:

- Leslie Anderson
- Michael Stolkey
- Paul Miller
