= Carleton, Michigan =

- Village
- Village of Carleton
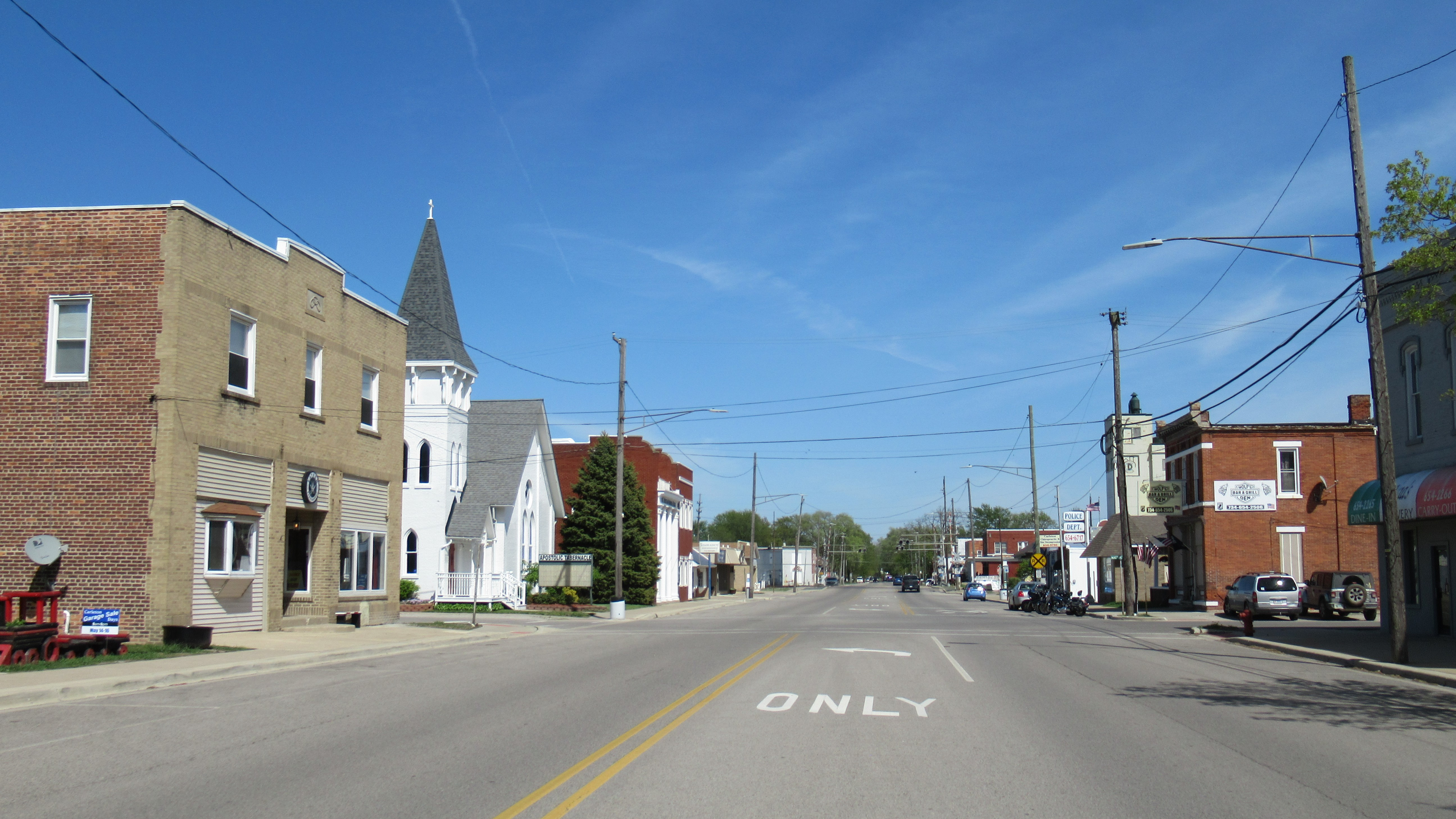
- Looking east along Monroe Street

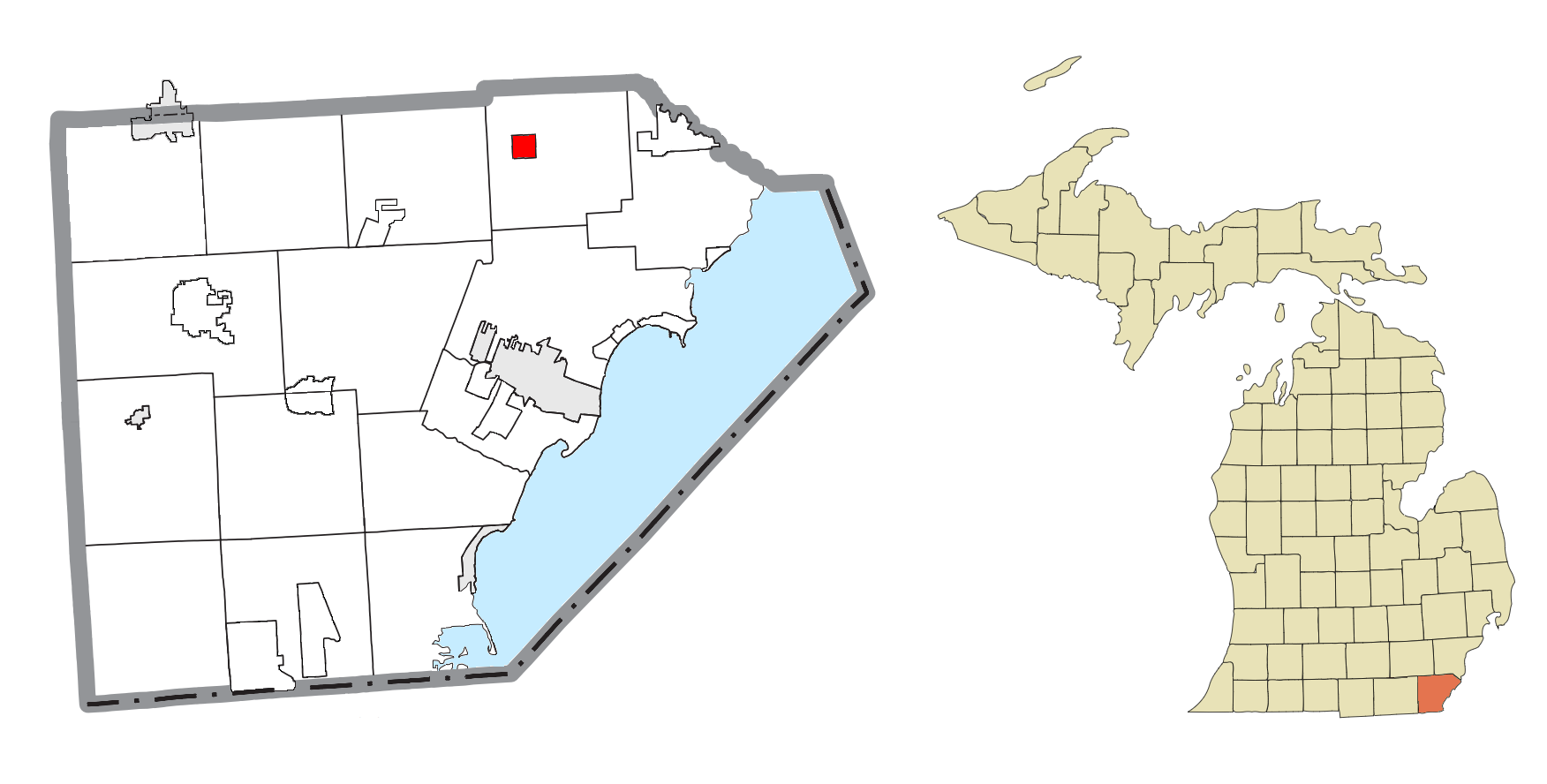
- Location within Monroe County

- Location within the state of Michigan Location within the United States
- Coordinates: 42°03′33″N 83°23′27″W
- Country: United States
- State: Michigan
- County: Monroe
- Township: Ash
- Platted: 1872
- Incorporated: 1911

Government
  - Type: Village council
  - President: James Penix
  - Clerk: Aimee Wiedbrauk

Area
  - Total: 0.99 sq mi (2.56 km^{2})
  - Land: 0.99 sq mi (2.56 km^{2})
  - Water: 0 sq mi (0.00 km^{2})
- Elevation: 617 ft (188 m)

Population (2020)
  - Total: 2,326
  - Density: 239.49/sq mi (92.47/km^{2})
- Time zone: UTC-5 (Eastern (EST))
  - Summer (DST): UTC-4 (EDT)
- ZIP code(s): 48117
- Area code: 734
- FIPS code: 26-13220
- GNIS feature ID: 0622719
- Website: Official website

Carleton is a village in Monroe County in the U.S. state of Michigan. The population was 2,326 at the 2020 census. The village is located within Ash Township.

== History ==
The community was first platted in 1872 by Daniel Matthews, who had worked previously to select Lansing as the state capital. He became the first postmaster when the Carleton post office was established on February 24, 1874. The community was named after Will Carleton, a local poet. The community centered along a railway line first built by the Pere Marquette Railway and a junction with the Chicago and Canada Southern Railway, as well as the nearby Pennsylvania Railroad. The village incorporated in 1911.

== Geography ==
Carleton is in northeastern Monroe County, in the western part of Ash Township. It is 11 miles (18 km) north of Monroe, the county seat, and 6 miles (10 km) southwest of Flat Rock. Interstate 275, a western bypass of the Detroit area, passes one mile east of the village, with access from Exit 5, Carleton Rockwood Road.

According to the U.S. Census Bureau, the village has a total area of 0.99 square miles (2.56 km^{2}), all land. The land is drained to the east and south by tributaries of Swan Creek, which flows southeast toward Lake Erie.

== Demographics ==
Historical population
Census	Pop.	Note	%±
1880	434		—
1890	386		−11.1%
1920	498		—
1930	837		68.1%
1940	864		3.2%
1950	1,039		20.3%
1960	1,379		32.7%
1970	1,503		9.0%
1980	2,786		85.4%
1990	2,770		−0.6%
2000	2,562		−7.5%
2010	2,345		−8.5%
2020	2,326		−0.8%
U.S. Decennial Census

=== 2020 census ===
As of the 2020 census, Carleton had a population of 2,326. The median age was 40.4 years. 21.8% of residents were under the age of 18 and 16.7% of residents were 65 years of age or older. For every 100 females there were 96.3 males, and for every 100 females age 18 and over there were 92.4 males age 18 and over.

0.0% of residents lived in urban areas, while 100.0% lived in rural areas.

There were 990 households in Carleton, of which 31.3% had children under the age of 18 living in them. Of all households, 40.5% were married-couple households, 19.5% were households with a male householder and no spouse or partner present, and 31.6% were households with a female householder and no spouse or partner present. About 30.0% of all households were made up of individuals and 14.4% had someone living alone who was 65 years of age or older.

There were 1,048 housing units, of which 5.5% were vacant. The homeowner vacancy rate was 2.3% and the rental vacancy rate was 5.7%.

Racial composition as of the 2020 census
Race	Number	Percent
White	2,115	90.9%
Black or African American	30	1.3%
American Indian and Alaska Native	9	0.4%
Asian	9	0.4%
Native Hawaiian and Other Pacific Islander	0	0.0%
Some other race	19	0.8%
Two or more races	144	6.2%
Hispanic or Latino (of any race)	86	3.7%

=== 2010 census ===
As of the census of 2010, there were 2,345 people, 953 households, and 631 families living in the village. The population density was 2,368.7 inhabitants per square mile (914.6/km^{2}). There were 1,048 housing units at an average density of 1,058.6 per square mile (408.7/km^{2}). The racial makeup of the village was 96.7% White, 0.2% African American, 0.5% Native American, 0.7% Asian, 0.1% Pacific Islander, 0.2% from other races, and 1.7% from two or more races. Hispanic or Latino of any race were 2.0% of the population.

There were 953 households, of which 34.5% had children under the age of 18 living with them, 45.9% were married couples living together, 13.3% had a female householder with no husband present, 7.0% had a male householder with no wife present, and 33.8% were non-families. 28.2% of all households were made up of individuals, and 10.4% had someone living alone who was 65 years of age or older. The average household size was 2.46 and the average family size was 3.02.

The median age in the village was 37.2 years. 25% of residents were under the age of 18; 8.5% were between the ages of 18 and 24; 27.3% were from 25 to 44; 27.3% were from 45 to 64; and 12% were 65 years of age or older. The gender makeup of the village was 49.6% male and 50.4% female.

=== 2000 census ===
As of the census of 2000, there were 2,562 people, 998 households, and 677 families living in the village. The population density was 2,577.3 inhabitants per square mile (995.1/km^{2}). There were 1,061 housing units at an average density of 1,067.3 per square mile (412.1/km^{2}). The racial makeup of the village was 96.72% White, 0.04% African American, 0.43% Native American, 0.23% Asian, 0.31% from other races, and 2.26% from two or more races. Hispanic or Latino of any race were 1.87% of the population.

There were 998 households, out of which 35.1% had children under the age of 18 living with them, 48.5% were married couples living together, 13.6% had a female householder with no husband present, and 32.1% were non-families. 26.8% of all households were made up of individuals, and 10.1% had someone living alone who was 65 years of age or older. The average household size was 2.57 and the average family size was 3.12.

In the village, the population was spread out, with 28.4% under the age of 18, 9.7% from 18 to 24, 30.5% from 25 to 44, 20.7% from 45 to 64, and 10.7% who were 65 years of age or older. The median age was 33 years. For every 100 females, there were 97.4 males. For every 100 females age 18 and over, there were 92.0 males.

The median income for a household in the village was $44,205, and the median income for a family was $50,000. Males had a median income of $41,289 versus $26,531 for females. The per capita income for the village was $20,394. About 9.6% of families and 10.6% of the population were below the poverty line, including 12.2% of those under age 18 and 13.1% of those age 65 or over.

== Education ==
The village of Carleton is served by Airport Community Schools.

== Notable people ==
- Kathy Angerer, politician who served on the Michigan House of Representatives from 2005 to 2010; born in Carleton
- Frederick Ballen, Civil War veteran and Medal of Honor recipient; buried in Carleton
- Freddie Bishop, retired professional football player; attended school in Carleton
- Jeff Jones, retired professional baseball player and coach
- Elmina R. Lucke, educator and social worker; born in Carleton

== Images ==
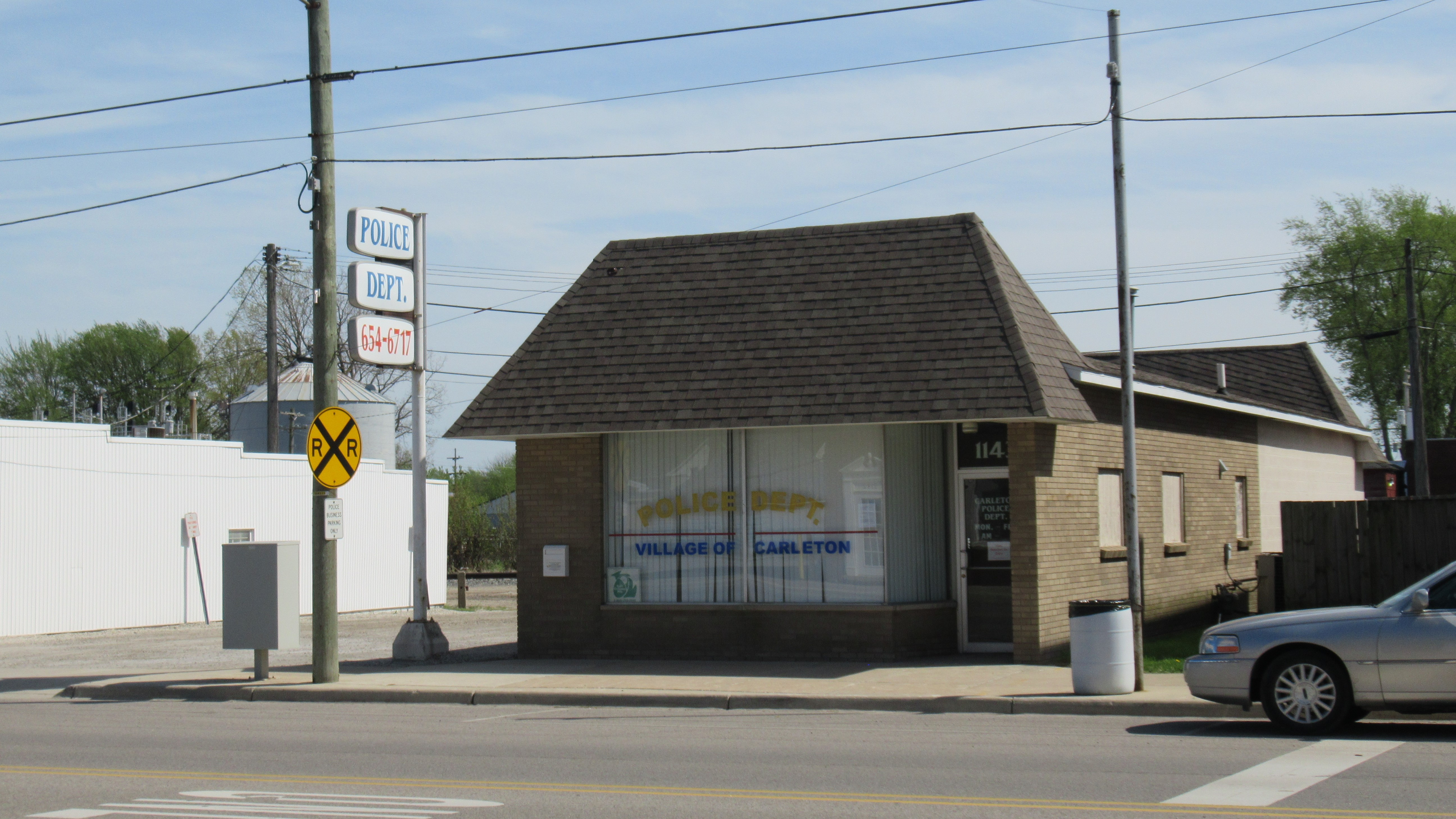
Carleton Police Department

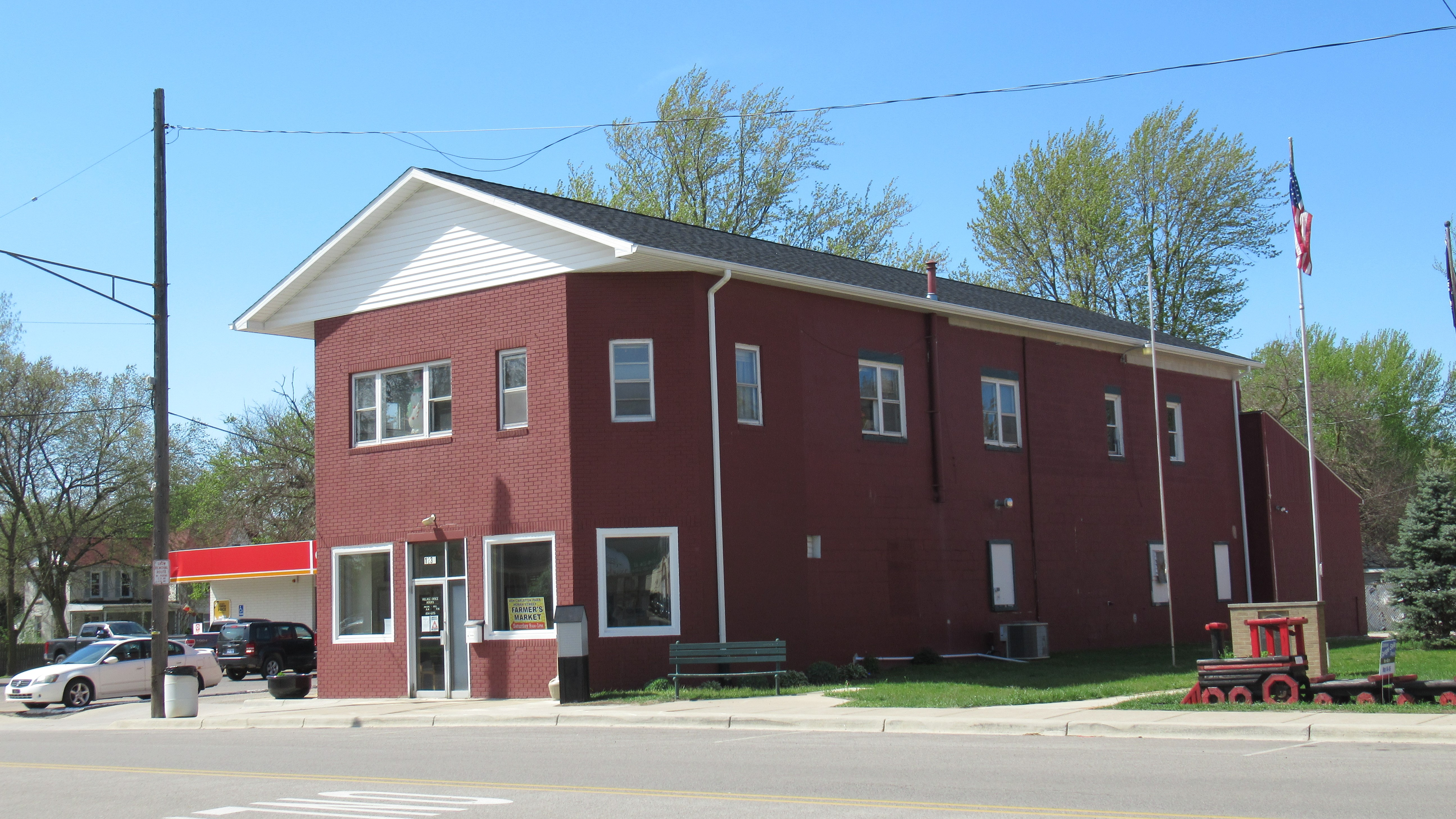
Carleton Village Office

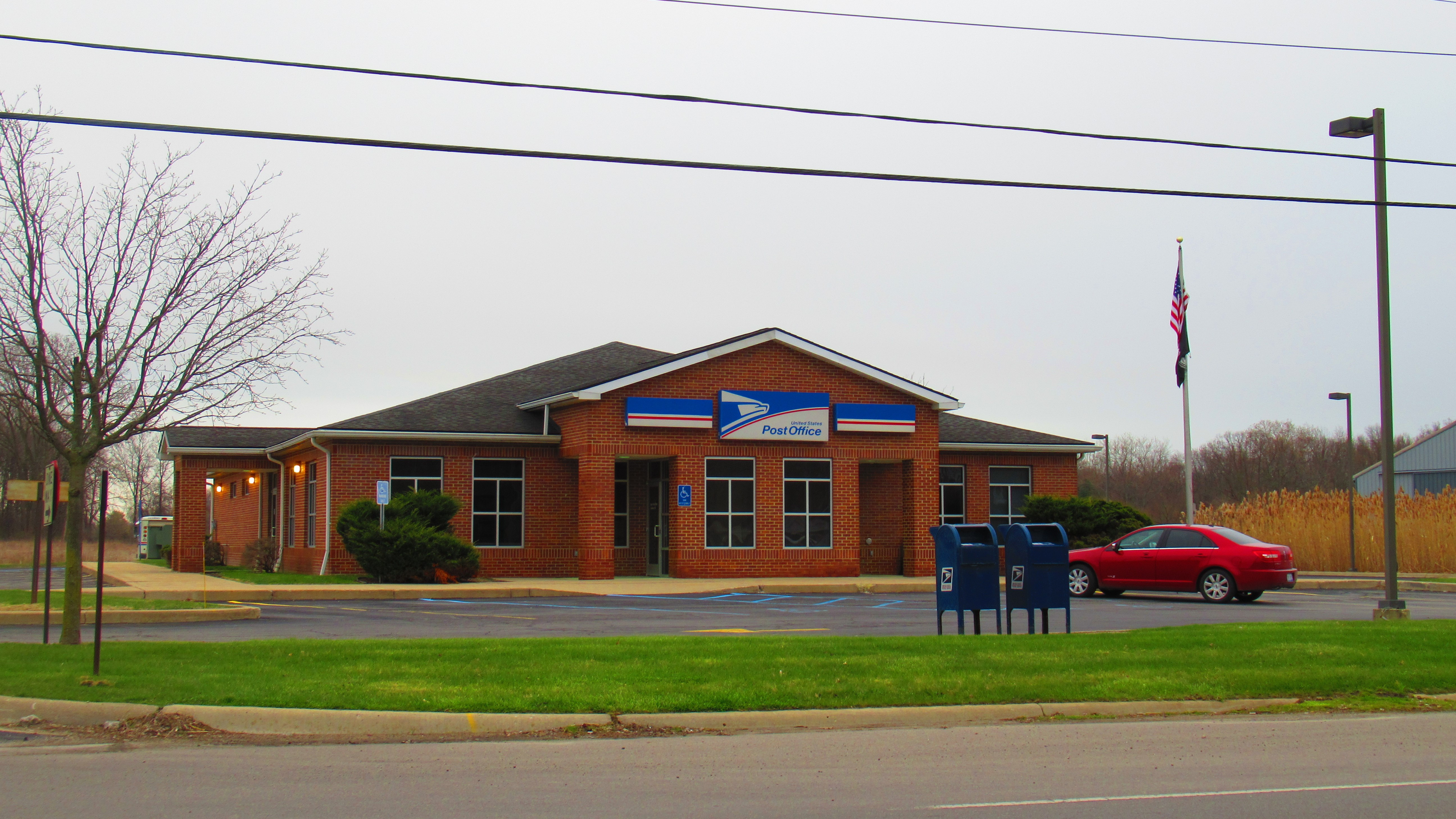
Carleton post office in Ash Township
