= National Register of Historic Places listings in Monroe County, Michigan =

Location of Monroe County in Michigan

This is a list of the National Register of Historic Places listings in Monroe County, Michigan.

This is intended to be a complete list of the properties and districts on the National Register of Historic Places in Monroe County, Michigan, United States. The locations of National Register properties and districts, for which the latitude and longitude coordinates are included below, may be seen in an online map.

There are 19 individual listings on the National Register in the county: nine properties, five historic districts, and one bridge. These listings include a lighthouse, statue, four houses, trading post, former factory, battlefield (Battle of Frenchtown), and six historic districts — one of which is an undeveloped archeological district. Eleven of the listings are located within the county's largest city, Monroe. The oldest of all properties listed is the Navarre-Anderson Trading Post, which was first built in 1789.

This National Park Service list is complete through NPS recent listings posted May 23, 2025.

== Current listings ==
	Name on the Register	Image	Date listed	Location	City or town	Description
1	George Armstrong Custer Equestrian Monument	George Armstrong Custer Equestrian Monument	December 9, 1994 (#94001430)	Junction of Elm Avenue and N. Monroe Street; 41°55′05″N 83°23′48″W	Monroe	A statue of George Armstrong Custer, who spent a portion of his childhood in Monroe, was unveiled by President Taft and Elizabeth Bacon Custer in 1910. Originally located near the courthouse and then later in a nearby park, the statue was moved to its current, prominent location in 1955.
2	Detroit River Light Station	Detroit River Light Station	August 4, 1983 (#83000886)	Lake Erie; 42°00′03″N 83°08′28″W	Berlin Charter Township	Built in 1885, this lighthouse is situated near the mouth of the Detroit River about three miles (4.8 km) off the coast of Pointe Mouillee State Game Area in Lake Erie in the northern portion of the county. The lighthouse is still in operation today, albeit completely automated, and public access is prohibited. It is owned and operated by the United States Coast Guard.
3	Dundee Historic District	Dundee Historic District	August 20, 1990 (#90001239)	Roughly bounded by Main, Monroe, and Toledo Streets; the River Raisin, and Riley, Tecumseh, and Ypsilanti Streets; 41°57′22″N 83°39′38″W	Dundee	Also known as the "Triangle District" for the unique shape of the area's grid plan, surviving buildings in this area date back to 1866, with the area being settled in as early as 1825. The area, which is located about one mile (0.6 km) east of US-23 along the River Raisin, features prominent Italianate and Greek Revival architecture. The buildings today are occupied by various retail businesses and government offices.
4	East Elm-North Macomb Street Historic District	East Elm-North Macomb Street Historic District	May 6, 1982 (#82002853)	Roughly bounded by the River Raisin and Lorain, Monroe, and Macomb Streets; 41°55′08″N 83°23′30″W	Monroe	Consisting of large houses dating back to the 1820s, the area is well known for its wide mixture of Greek Revival, Federal, Second Empire, and Victorian architecture. Some of Monroe's most significant residents, such as Robert McClelland, have resided in this area. Today, these grandiose dwellings are privately owned and are among the largest in Monroe.
5	Hall of the Divine Child	Hall of the Divine Child	April 17, 2017 (#100000885)	810 W. Elm Ave. 41°55′18″N 83°24′19″W	Monroe	
6	Edward Loranger House	Edward Loranger House	May 31, 1984 (#84001807)	7211 S. Stoney Creek Road; 41°58′54″N 83°22′22″W	Frenchtown Charter Township	Built in 1825 by famed local bricklayer, landowner, and architect Edward Loranger, it is one of the oldest intact structures in the county. Other buildings on the property, such as Loranger's sawmill, have been moved to The Henry Ford, while his house remains in its original location and has since been restored by its current owner.
7	Gov. Robert McClelland House	Gov. Robert McClelland House	September 3, 1971 (#71000415)	47 E. Elm Avenue; 41°55′04″N 83°23′40″W	Monroe	Robert McClelland lived for a brief period of time in this house, which was built in 1841. He was a very well known politician on the local, state, and national levels. His house is a prime example of Greek Revival architecture. Today, the house is privately owned and is also part of the East Elm-North Macomb Street Historic District
8	Jefferson Avenue-Huron River and Harbin Drive-Silver Creek Canal Bridges	Jefferson Avenue-Huron River and Harbin Drive-Silver Creek Canal Bridges	February 10, 2000 (#00000080)	W. Jefferson Avenue over Huron River and Harbin Drive over Silver Creek Canal; 42°02′32″N 83°12′52″W	Berlin Charter Township	This listing covers two separate bridges: the Jefferson Avenue Bridge, which carries W. Jefferson Avenue over the Huron River and the smaller Harbin Drive Bridge spanning the Silver Creek Canal. Only the Jefferson Avenue Bridge is in Monroe County, as it connects Monroe County to Brownstown Charter Township in Wayne County. For that reason, it is also listed on the NRHP listings in Wayne County article.
9	Main Street Historic District	Main Street Historic District	April 14, 1999 (#99000434)	3-153 E. Main, 1-41 W. Main, and 8 Park Lane; 42°05′05″N 83°41′01″W	Milan	The Main Street Historic District is a commercial historic district that includes structures originally built as a hotel, city hall/fire station, post office, church, hospital, meeting hall, and theatre. Although within Milan, the district spans the county line between Washtenaw County, Michigan and Monroe County, Michigan, containing structures within both counties. For that reason, it is also listed on the NRHP listings in Washtenaw County article.
10	Navarre-Anderson Trading Post	Navarre-Anderson Trading Post	July 31, 1972 (#72000645)	West of Monroe at N. Custer (M-130) and Raisinville Roads; 41°56′05″N 83°27′35″W	Frenchtown Charter Township	The main building of this small complex was built in 1789 and is the oldest wooden residential building in the state. The cookhouse dates to 1810, while other buildings, such as the barn, are replicas. The buildings were moved from their original location in 1894, and the complex has been restored and sits near the corner of North Custer Road (formerly M-130) and Raisinville Road in the outskirts of Frenchtown Township along the River Raisin.
11	Rudolph Nims House	Rudolph Nims House	October 18, 1972 (#72000644)	206 W. Noble Street; 41°55′21″N 83°23′52″W	Monroe	Located two blocks west of M-125 in Monroe, this house was built between 1836–1846 in the style of Greek Revival architecture. Built by Jacques Godfroy, Rudolph Nims purchased the house in 1848, and the house remained in his family for over a century. The house has undergone extensive additions and remodeling, but the front facade remains original. Today, the house is privately owned.
12	North Maumee Bay Archeological District	North Maumee Bay Archeological District	December 5, 1980 (#80001882)	Address Restricted; 41°45′N 83°27′W	Erie Township	While the official address of the archeological site is restricted, the district incorporates the area of the North Maumee Bay at the mouth of the Ottawa River and Maumee River in Lake Erie. The sparsely populated area includes the Woodtick Peninsula, Garb Island, Indian Island, the Erie Fish and Hunt Club, and much of the grassy shoreline and interior wetlands.
13	Old Village Historic District	Old Village Historic District	May 6, 1982 (#82002854)	M-50 and M-125; 41°54′45″N 83°24′00″W	Monroe	This district centers around Front Street and Monroe Street (M-125) and extends several blocks in the downtown area. Some of the buildings date back as early as 1830, and these buildings are now owned by various retail businesses and apartments. The outer areas of this district include the courthouse (1880) and the city's first post office (1913), which is now a museum.
14	River Raisin Battlefield Site	River Raisin Battlefield Site	December 10, 1982 (#82000542)	1403 E. Elm Ave. 41°54′49″N 83°22′43″W	Monroe	The River Raisin National Battlefield Park is an authorized addition to the United States National Park System under the Omnibus Public Land Management Act of 2009. Located along the River Raisin, the park, which is still under construction, will commemorate the Battle of Frenchtown during the War of 1812. Though authorized, it is not yet included in the list of National Battlefield Parks. A boundary increase in 2019 added the house at 1403 E. Elm Ave.
15	St. Mary's Academy Historic District	St. Mary's Academy Historic District	June 12, 2019 (#82005047)	610 W. Elm Ave. 41°55′15″N 83°24′18″W	Monroe	
16	St. Mary's Church Complex Historic District	St. Mary's Church Complex Historic District	May 6, 1982 (#82002855)	Elm Avenue and Monroe Street (M-125); 41°55′08″N 83°23′48″W	Monroe	This complex comprises four main buildings: St. Mary Church, the rectory, St. Mary Catholic Central High School, and the Brothers of Holy Cross Hall. The church itself dates back to 1788 and is one of the oldest Catholic parishes still in operation, while the current church building dates back to 1835 and is renowned for its Gothic Revival architecture. The church continues to be one of the most important religious institutions in Monroe.
17	Sawyer House	Sawyer House	November 23, 1977 (#77000721)	320 E. Front Street; 41°54′53″N 83°23′36″W	Monroe	This Italianate house is on the oldest piece of European settled land in Monroe. The property was settled in as early as 1785 and had several incarnations and owners before the current house was built in 1873. The most famous resident of the property was Dr. Alfred Sawyer, who lived there from 1859 to 1870. In 1938, the house was given to the city. The house is currently open to the public for a wide variety of functions.
18	Weis Manufacturing Company	Weis Manufacturing Company	October 26, 1981 (#81000313)	Union and West 7th Streets; 41°54′56″N 83°24′39″W	Monroe	This complex was constructed between 1905–1912 and was a major employer in Monroe for many decades. The company produced office equipment until it was converted into a manufacturing facility for La-Z-Boy in 1964. The facility was shut down in 1978. The city of Monroe purchased the abandoned facility in 1980 and has since remodeled it as a residential hall for senior citizens.
19	Wing–Allore House	Wing–Allore House	December 10, 2014 (#14001008)	203 E. Elm Ave. 41°55′03″N 83°23′35″W	Monroe	

== Former listings ==
	Name on the Register	Image	Date listed	Date removed	Location	City or town	Description
1	Fix House	Fix House	March 16, 1972 (#72000643)	June 1, 1981	Sterling State Park; 41°55′39″N 83°20′37″W	Monroe	The Fix House, demolished in 1980, was a one-and-one-half-story brick structure built in the tradition of French-Canadian vernacular cottages. It was built in 1853 and side additions were constructed some years later. Only fifteen such buildings were identified in Monroe County, which was settled by French pioneers in the 1780s.

== See also ==
- List of Michigan State Historic Sites in Monroe County, Michigan
- List of National Historic Landmarks in Michigan
- National Register of Historic Places listings in Michigan
- Listings in neighboring counties: Lenawee, Lucas (OH), Washtenaw, Wayne
