= List of Michigan State Historic Sites in Monroe County =

Location of Monroe County in Michigan

The following is a list of Michigan State Historic Sites in Monroe County, Michigan. Sites marked with a dagger (†) are also listed on the National Register of Historic Places in Monroe County, Michigan.

== Current listings ==
Name	Image	Location	Municipality	Listing date
Alfred Wilkerson Grist Mill		242 Toledo Street	Dundee	August 3, 1979
Bedford District No. 6 School		25 East Sterns Road	Bedford Township	August 12, 1983
Bridge School		96 Ida Maybee Road	Raisinville Township	December 17, 1987
Edward Loranger House †		7211 South Stony Creek Road	Frenchtown Township	October 2, 1980
Exeter Township Hall		Southwest corner of Sumpter Road and Grant Street	Exeter Township	September 3, 1998
First Organized Public School District		T7S, R8 & 9E	Monroe vicinity	September 17, 1957
Fix House (Demolished, NRHP delisted 1981)		Sterling State Park; 2800 State Park Road	Frenchtown Township	October 29, 1971
George Armstrong Custer Equestrian Monument †		Southwest corner of Elm Street and North Monroe Street	Monroe	June 15, 1992
Governor Robert McClelland House †		47 East Elm Street	Monroe	March 3, 1971
Johnson-Phinney House		22 West Second Street	Monroe	February 23, 1978
Lake Erie Informational Designation		Sterling State Park; 2800 State Park Road	Frenchtown Township	January 19, 1957
Maybee Village Hall		9051 Raisin Street	Maybee	March 15, 1988
Michigan Historic Crossroads Informational Site		Michigan Welcome Center; Northbound Interstate 75 at 10 mile marker	Monroe Township	September 17, 1957
Michigan Southern Railroad		Intersection of First Street and Front Street	Monroe	September 25, 1956
Monroe County Informational Designation		126 South Monroe Street	Monroe	July 19, 1956
Monroe Paper Industry		East Elm Street and North Dixie Highway	Monroe	September 25, 1956
Navarre–Anderson Trading Post †		3775 North Custer Road	Frenchtown Township	June 16, 1972
Potter Cemetery / Public Act 525 of 2012		3700 East Sigler Road	Ash Township	2017
River Raisin Battlefield Site †		333 North Dixie Highway	Monroe	February 18, 1956
Rudolph Nims House †		206 West Noble Avenue	Monroe	October 29, 1971
St. John the Baptist Catholic Church		511 Monroe Street	Monroe	April 15, 1999
St. John Evangelical Lutheran Church and Parsonage		460 Riley Street	Dundee	September 19, 1991
St. Patrick Church		2996 West Labo Road	Ash Township	October 10, 1989
Sawyer House †		320 East Front Street	Monroe	June 19, 1975
Seitz Inn		8941 North Custer Road	Raisinville Township	October 23, 1979
Toledo War Informational Designation		Michigan Welcome Center; Northbound Interstate 75 at 10 mile marker	Monroe Township	November 27, 1956
Woodland Cemetery		438 Jerome Street	Monroe	July 21, 1988

== See also ==
- National Register of Historic Places listings in Monroe County, Michigan

== Sources ==
- Historic Sites Online – Monroe County. Michigan State Housing Developmental Authority. Accessed May 18, 2011.
