= St. Mary's Academy Historic District (Monroe, Michigan) =

- U.S. National Register of Historic Places
- U.S. Historic district
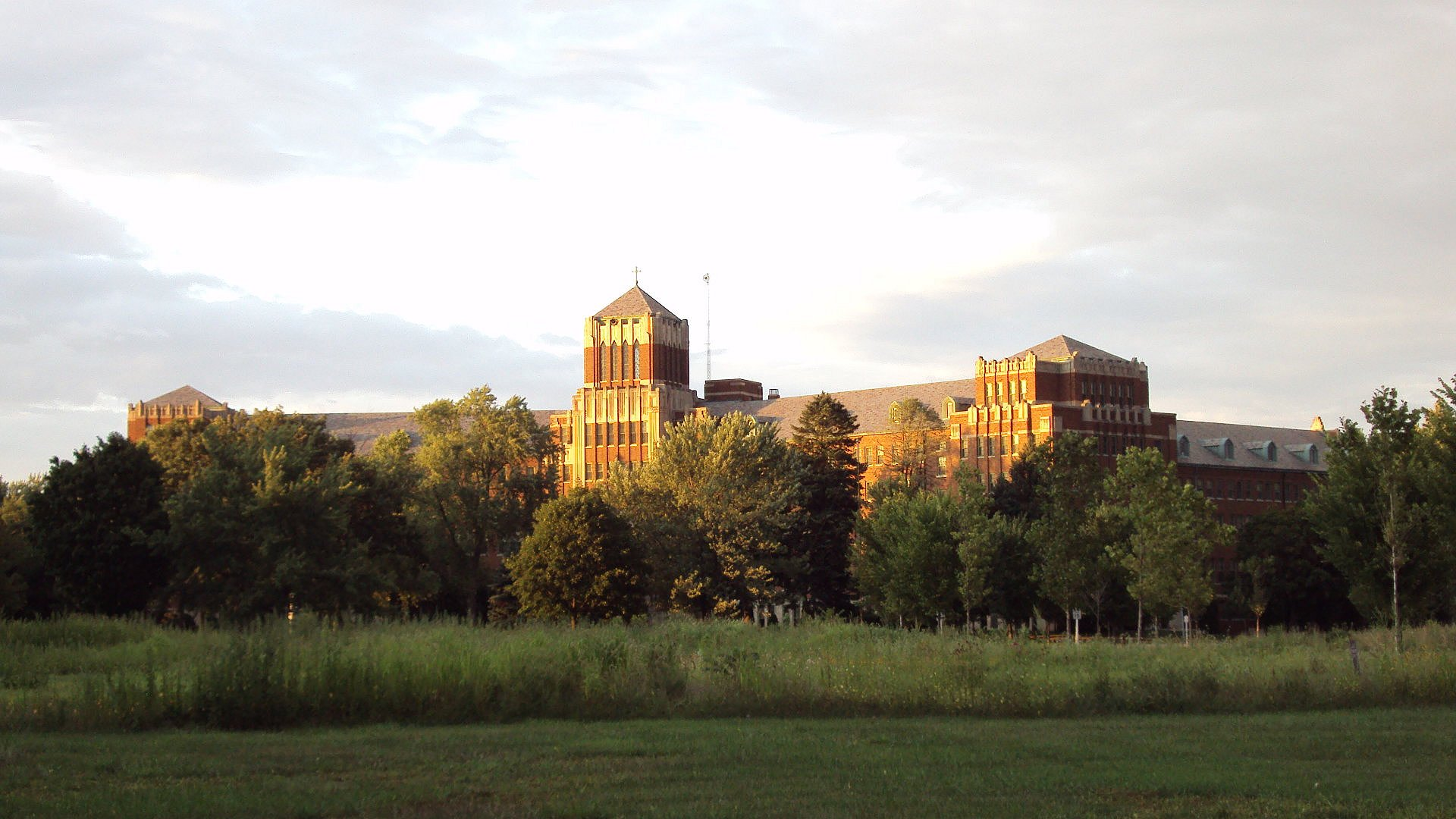
- Interactive map
- Location: 610 W. Elm Ave., Monroe, Michigan
- Coordinates: 41°55′15″N 83°23′18″W
- Area: 69 acres (28 ha)
- Built: 1916
- Architect: D.A. Bohlen & Son
- Architectural style: Art Deco, Tudor Revival, Tudor Gothic
- MPS: City of Monroe MRA
- NRHP reference No.: 82005047
- Added to NRHP: June 12, 2019

The St. Mary's Academy Historic District is a religious building complex located at 610 W. Elm Avenue in Monroe, Michigan. It was listed on the National Register of Historic Places in 2019.

== History ==
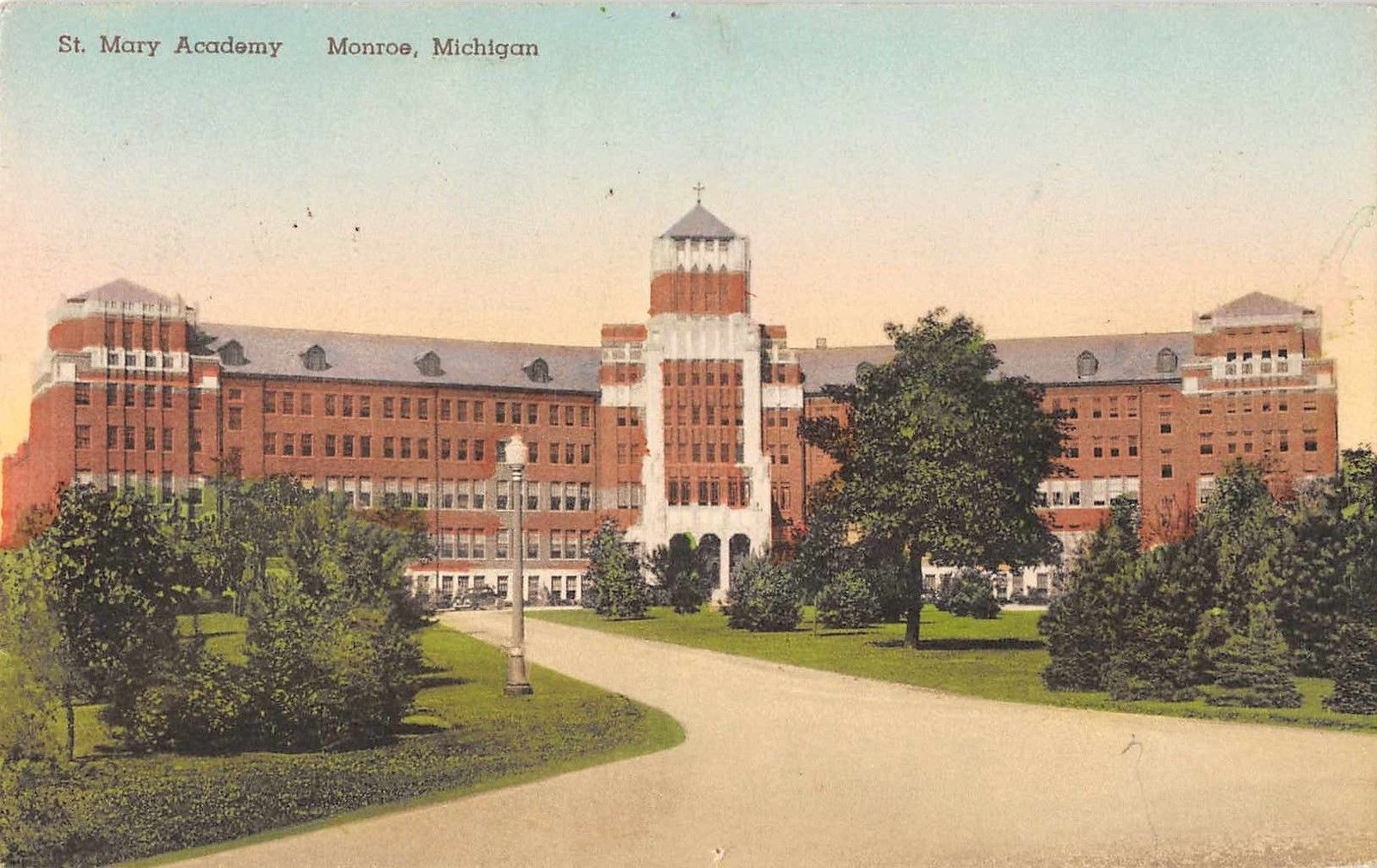

In 1845, Sisters Theresa Renauld, Theresa Maxis and Ann Shaaf moved to Monroe to found the Sisters, Servants of the Immaculate Heart of Mary. In 1846, the opened St. Mary Academy as a boarding school for girls, then located at the corner of Monroe and Elm. At first, the school grew slowly, but the pace quickened in the 1870s, prompting the construction of a new building in 1881. By 1904, a second building was needed; this was constructed at the current site of St. Mary Catholic Central High School. This building was destroyed by fire in 1929. A third building, the present one, was constructed in 1932 on the site of the SSIHM Motherhouse.

In 1945, an all-boys school, Monroe Catholic Central, was established at the previous site of the St. Mary Academy. By the 1970s, however, both St. Mary Academy and Monroe Catholic Central were faced with declining enrollment. In 1986, the two schools merged, moving into the Monroe Catholic Central facility to form St. Mary Catholic Central High School. The former St. Mary Academy building was vacated.

== Description ==
The St. Mary Academy building was designed by the Indianapolis architectural firm of D.A. Bohlen & Son. The building is Gothic in style, made of soft-tone variegated brick with stone trim. It consists of a central tower with five-story wings radiating outward.
