= Old Village Historic District (Monroe, Michigan) =

Historic district in Michigan, United States

- U.S. National Register of Historic Places
- U.S. Historic district
- Michigan State Historic Site
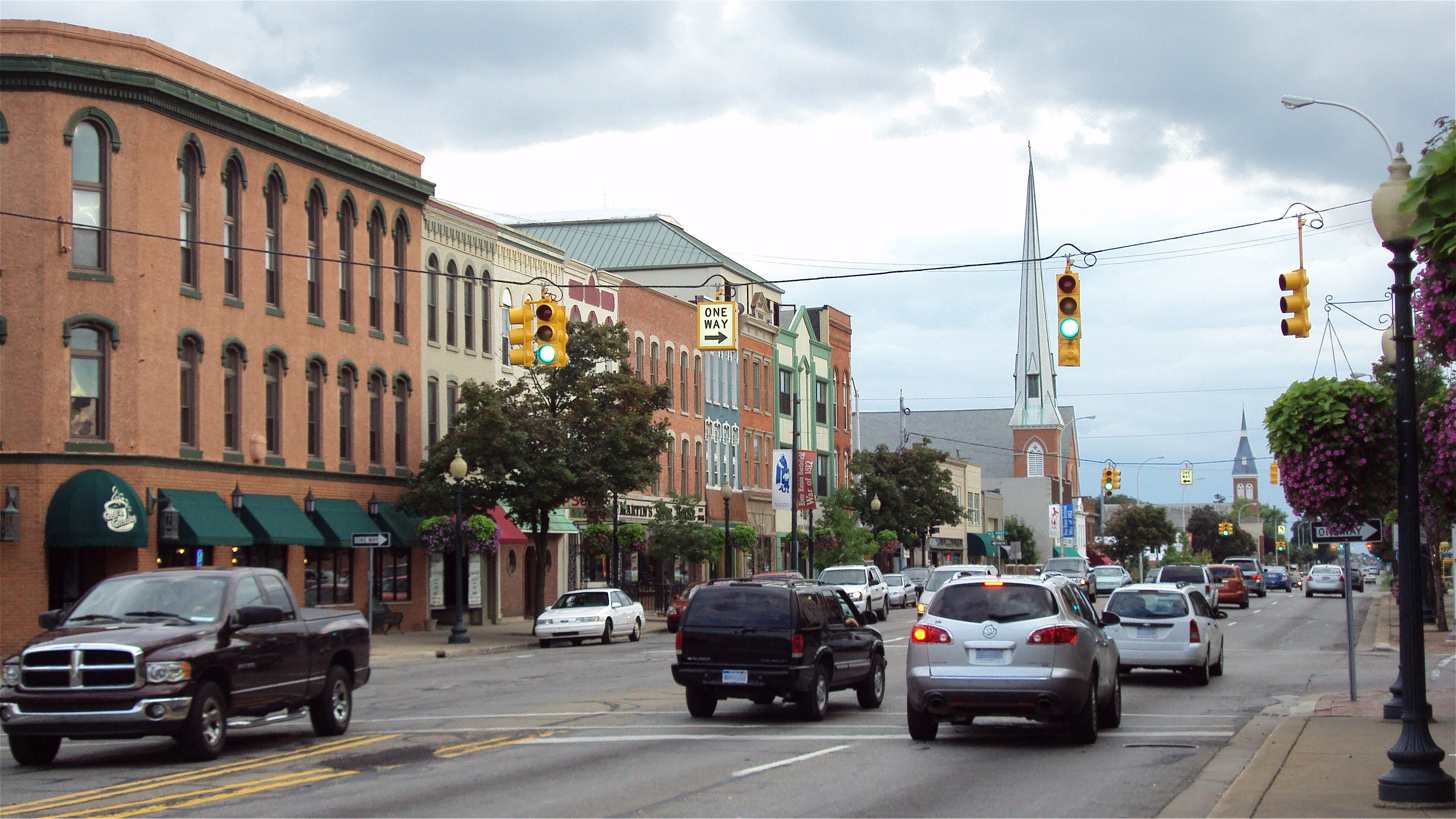
- Looking south along Monroe Street (M-125)

- Location within Michigan Location within the United States
- Interactive map
- Location: Monroe, Michigan
- Coordinates: 41°54′45″N 83°24′00″W
- NRHP reference No.: 82002854
- Added to NRHP: May 6, 1982

The Old Village Historic District is a commercial and residential historic district consisting of the downtown area of the city of Monroe in Monroe County, Michigan. The district was listed as a Michigan Historic Site and added to the National Register of Historic Places on May 6, 1982.

The area is commonly referred to as the downtown area and is the oldest settled area in Monroe, dating back to 1817 when the area was first platted. Some of the oldest surviving buildings in this district date back to 1830, and the district incorporates several different architectural styles. The stretch of the district that runs along M-125 is also designated as one of the Pure Michigan Byways.

== History ==
The area dates back to 1817 when the first roads were drawn out on a piece of land given by local landowner Joseph Loranger for the establishment of the village for the newly organized Monroe County. The grid plan, drawn up by Henry Disbrow, was modeled after the system used in New York City, with streets named after numbers. Although small at first, the city grew rapidly along the River Raisin beginning around 1830. While much of the growing population began spreading throughout Monroe County, the majority lived within the Old Village where the center of government and industry resided. The current county courthouse was built in 1880, although the plot of land it is located on has housed the seat of the county government since 1817. Monroe opened its first post office in 1913. The main industry at the time was Monroe's numerous paper mills along the River Raisin. The Dundee Historic District in Dundee was settled further up the river around the same time, and the two heavily relied on the river and built several dams along its course.

The Navarre-Anderson Trading Post, built in 1789, was originally part of the Old Village along the River Raisin. However, development in the area threatened the historic structure, and it was moved in 1894 and again in 1971. Today, it is far removed from the rest of the Old Village. The Sawyer House was built in 1873 and is located at 320 East Front Street within the Old Village Historic District.

On July 4, 1910, then-President William Howard Taft and Elizabeth Bacon Custer unveiled a statue to commemorate George Armstrong Custer, who spent much of his early life living in Monroe. The statue was located in the middle of the intersection of East First Street and Washington Street in the Old Village. This was during a time when automobile traffic in Monroe was very light. However, with the increase of automobile traffic, the statue's location in the middle of an intersection warranted protests as a traffic hazard. On June 20, 1923, the city moved the statue out of the Old Village to a less prominent location along the River Raisin, where it remained until it was moved again in August 1955 to its current location on the other side of the river from the Old Village. Today, the statue is listed on the National Register of Historic Places as the George Armstrong Custer Equestrian Monument.

The district has seen little redevelopment or expansion since the 1930s. In the 1960s, several older buildings within the district were demolished to make way for new modern buildings and parking lots, as the district was seen as old fashioned and unable to keep with the demands of new industries and growing populations.

== Present day ==
Today, the district itself centers around M-125 and M-50, known locally as Monroe Street and Front Street respectively, and extends for several blocks east and south. The district is roughly bounded by the River Raisin on the north, 7th Street on the south, and Navarre Street on the east.

Most of the major businesses and industries began moving to the more spacious outer core of Monroe. Today, the center of government and law enforcement within Monroe remains in the Old Village. The row buildings along Monroe Street consist of small businesses on the ground level and apartments and offices on the second and third floors. The outer areas of the Old Village include the city hall, post office, county courthouse and jail, various small businesses, Monroe Middle School, a food-packaging plant, and larger houses. The Old Village remains an active part of Monroe's economy, although the majority of businesses have moved elsewhere in the city. The Old Village Historic District is located directly across the river from the East Elm-North Macomb Street Historic District and the St. Mary's Church Complex Historic District.

== Gallery ==
=== Historic images ===
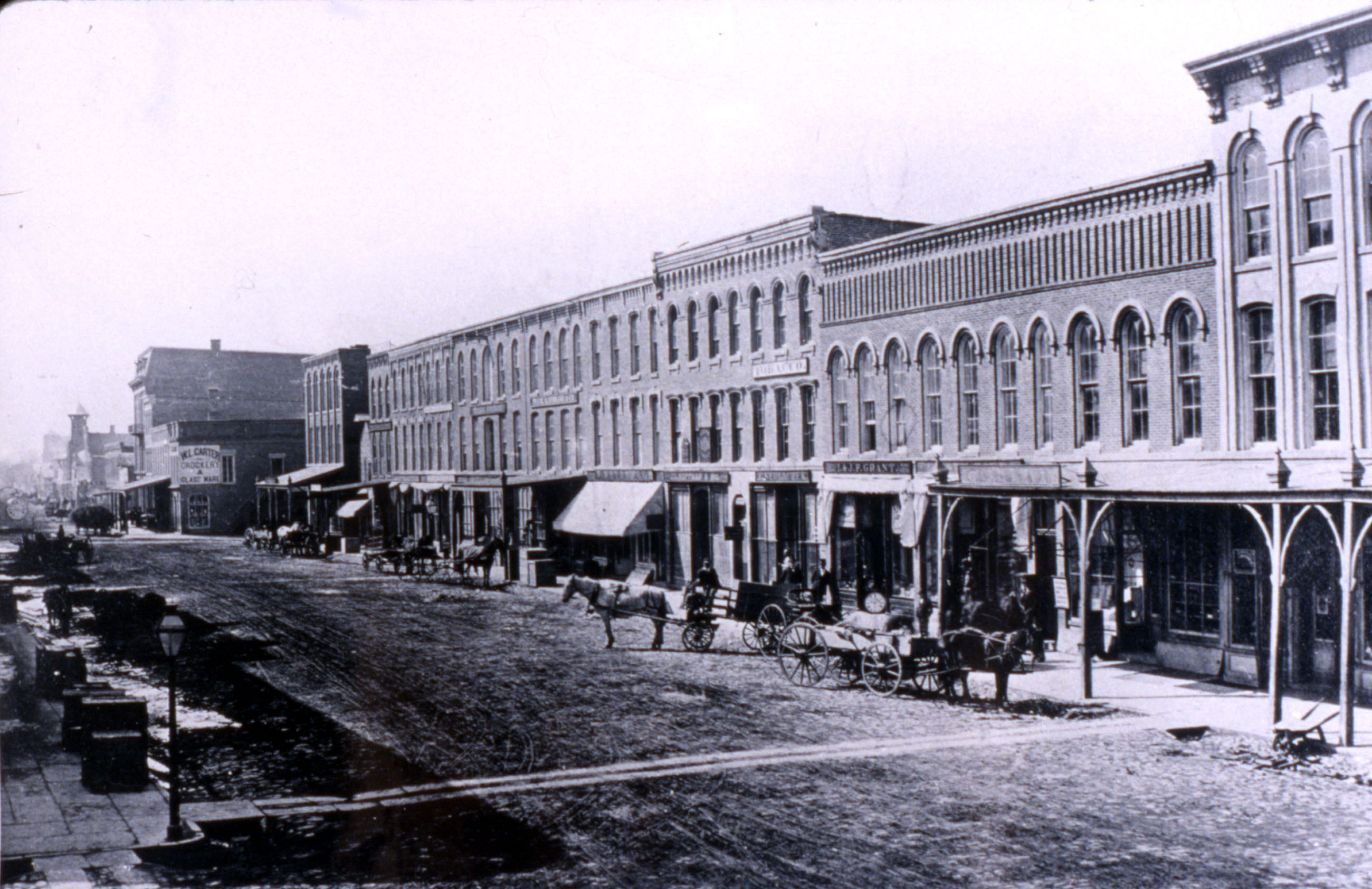
Front Street looking west toward the rest of the district in the year 1880

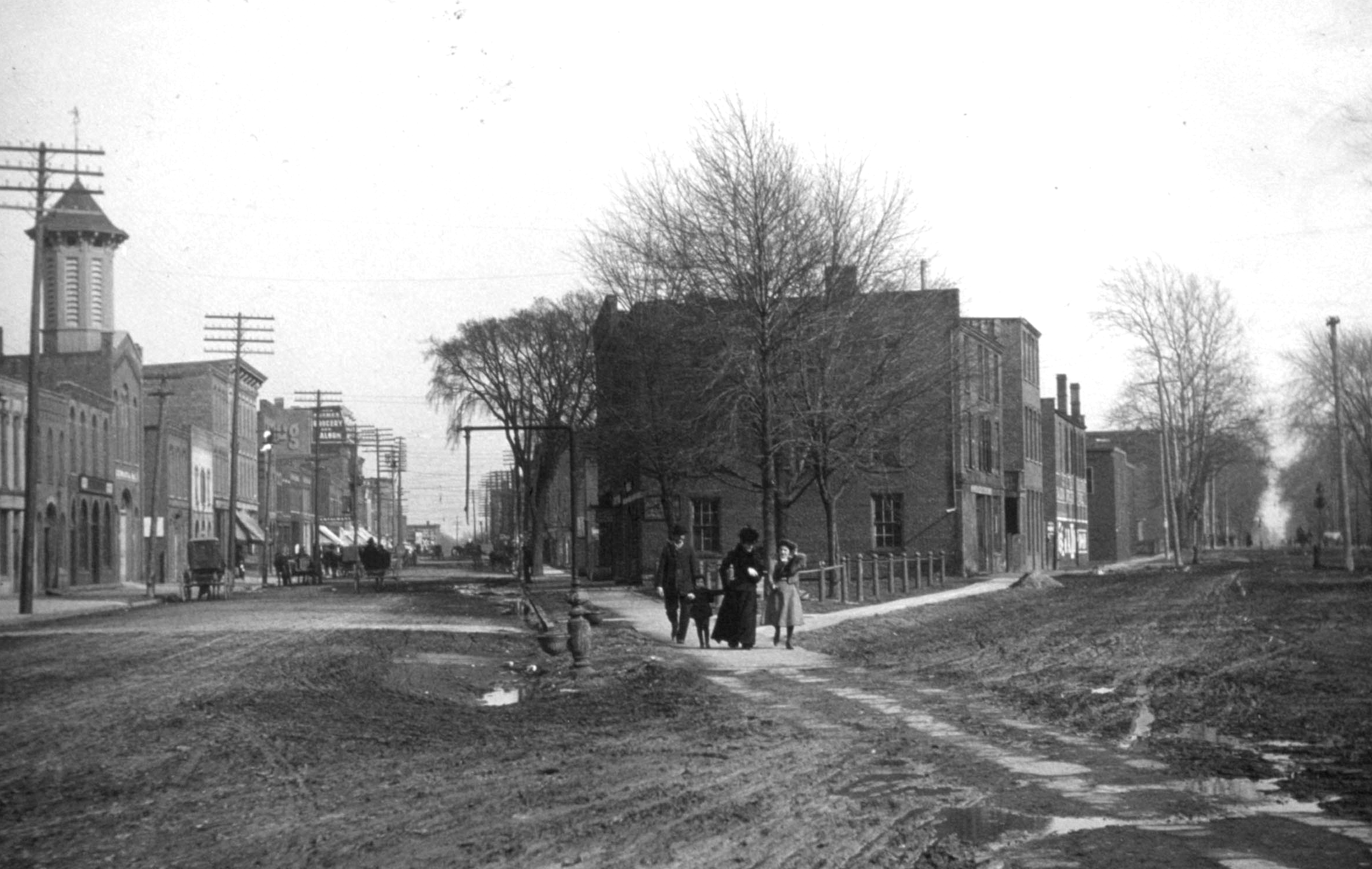
Front Street looking east toward the Old Village in the year 1900

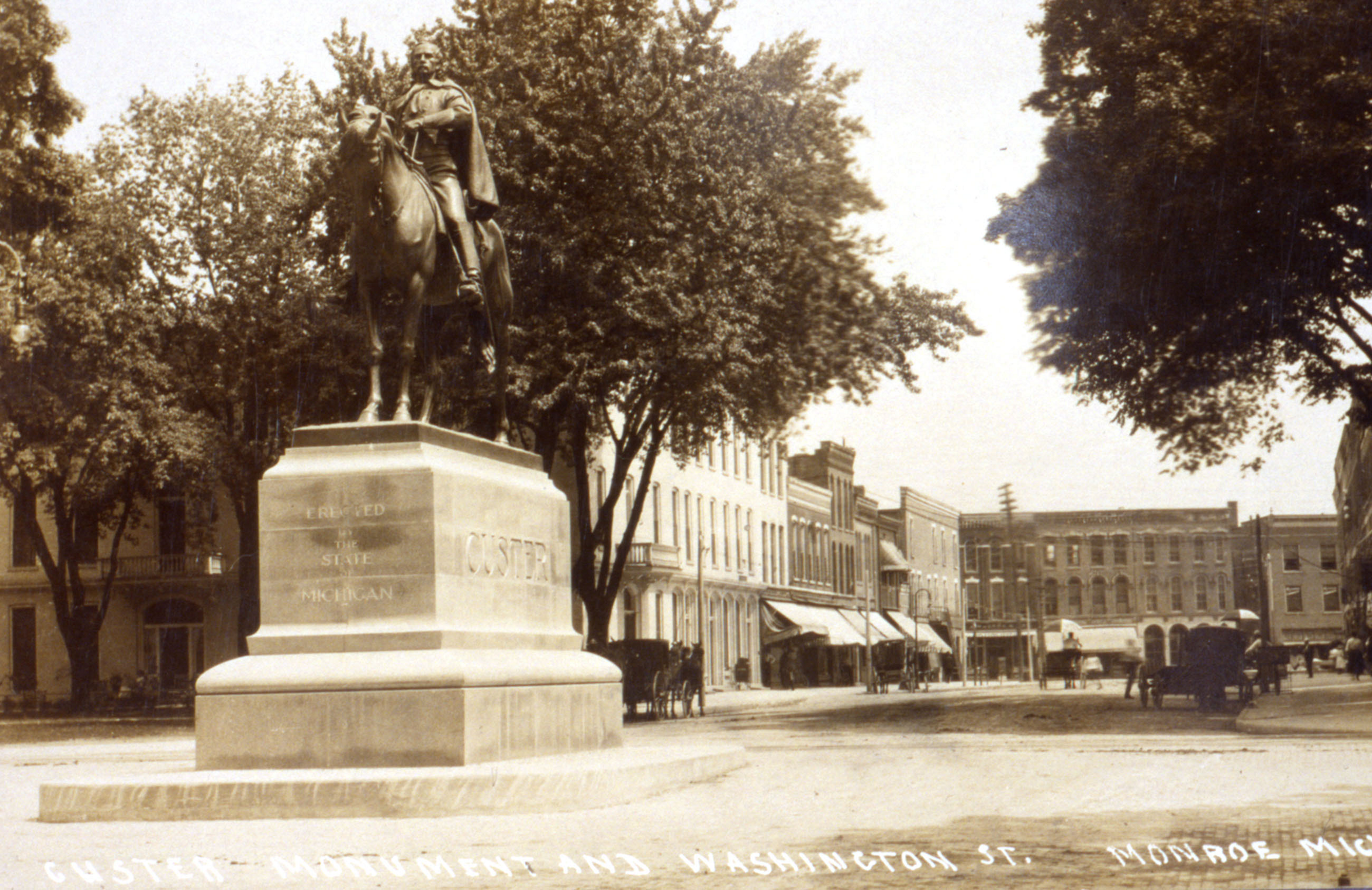
The original location of the Custer statue at Washington and East First (1910)

=== Modern images ===
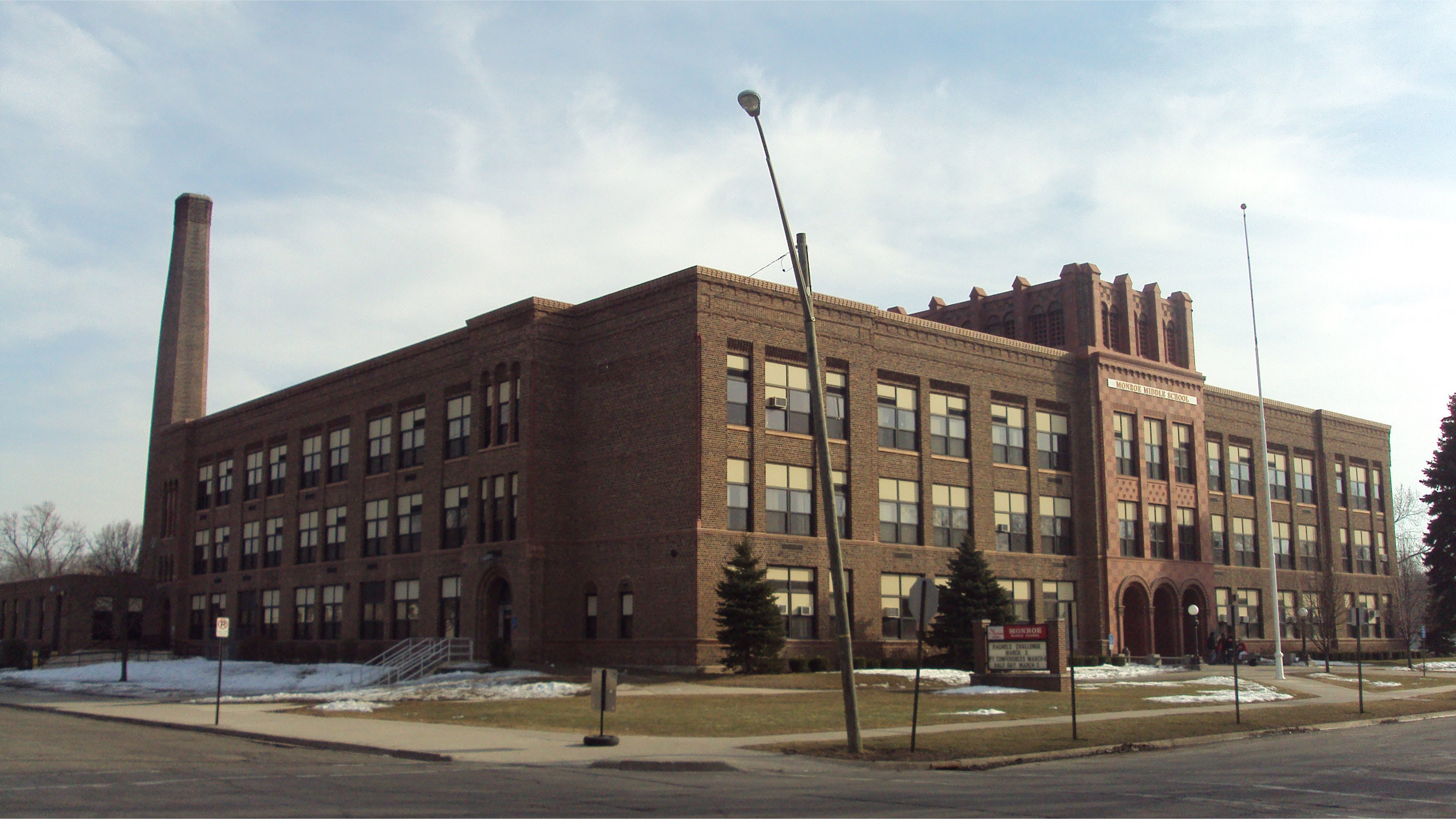
Monroe Middle School (1930), originally the high school, at 503 Washington Street

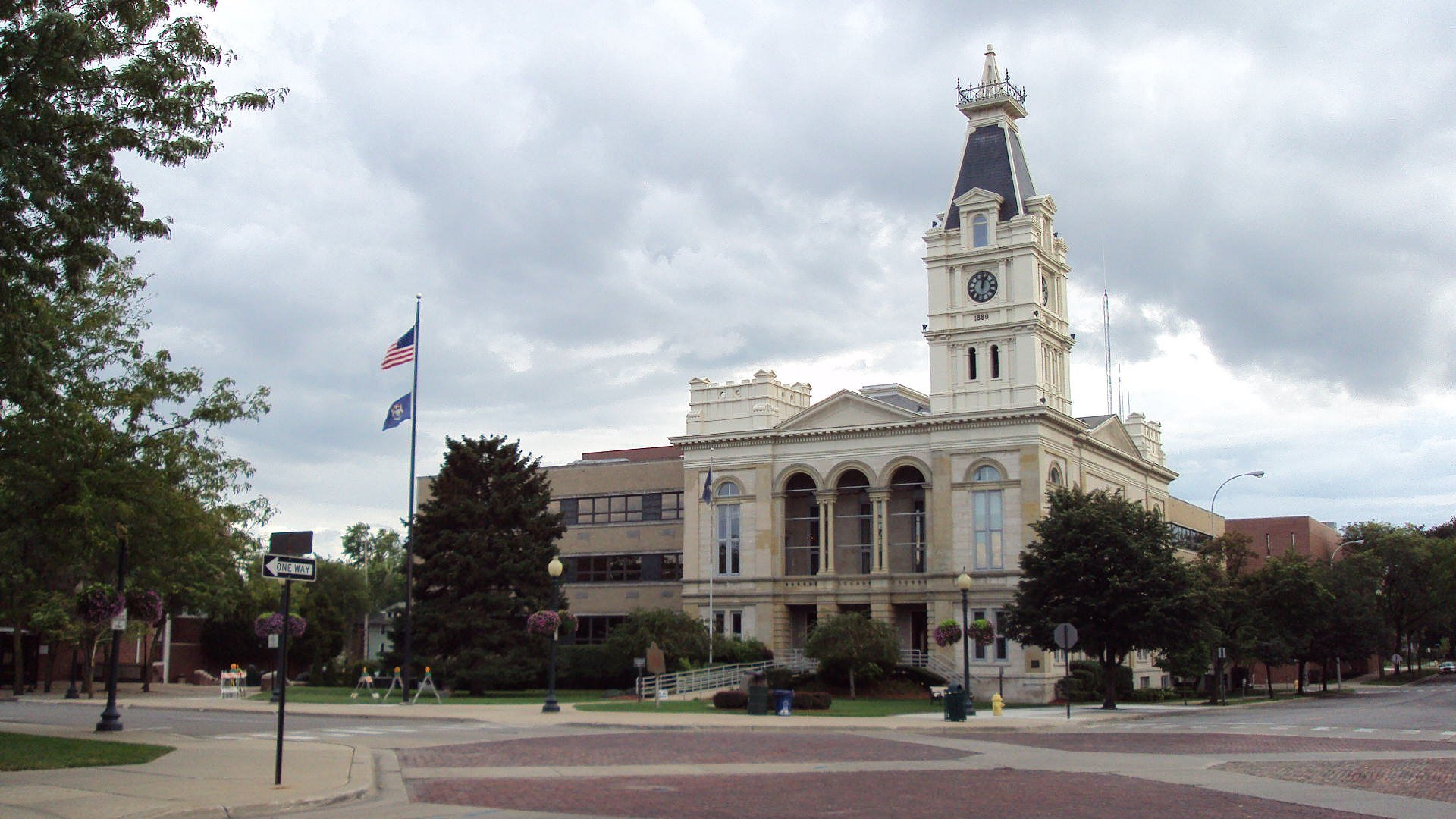
The current county courthouse (1880), located at 106 E. First Street

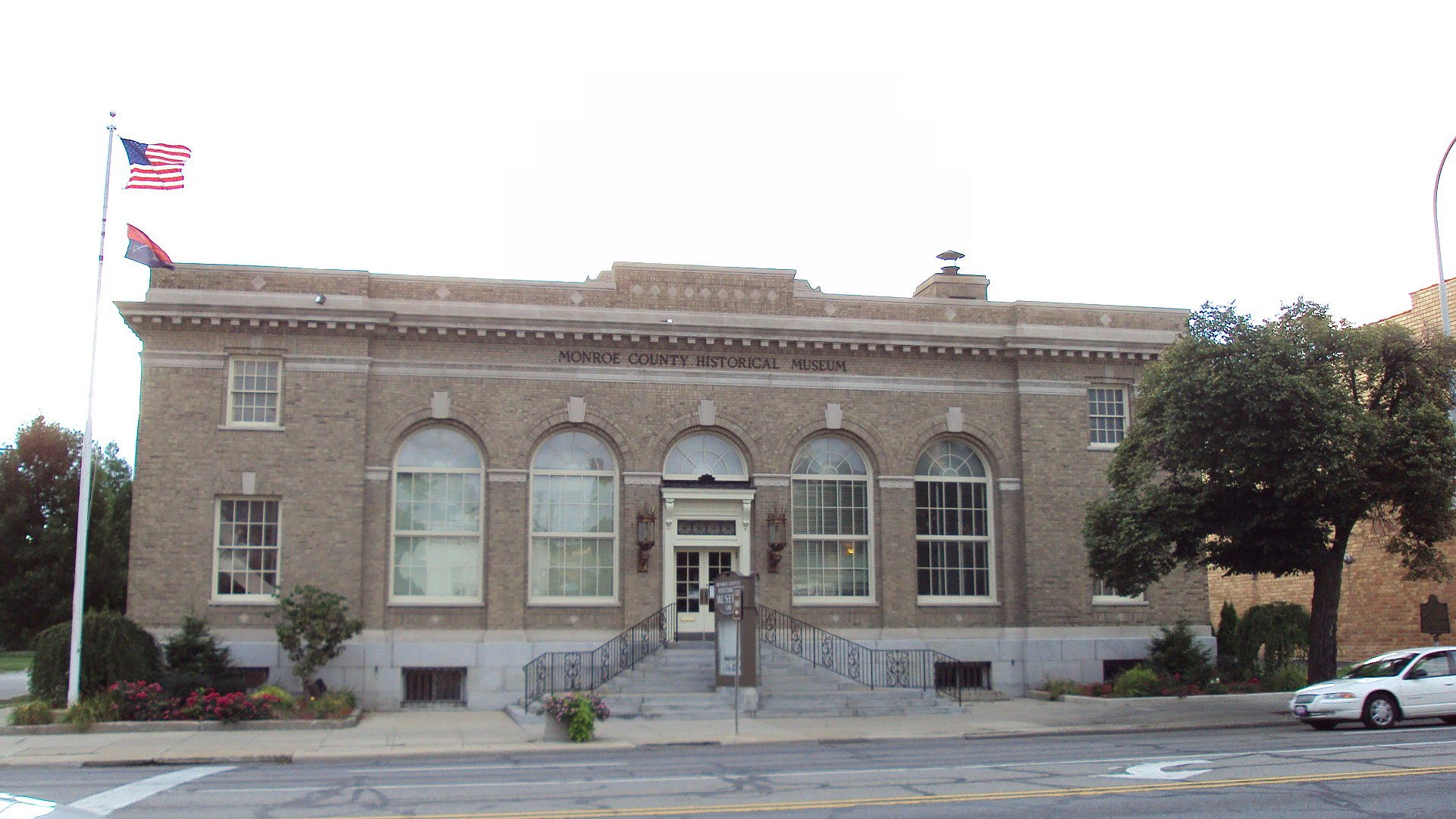
Former post office (1913), at 126 S. Monroe Street, now the county museum

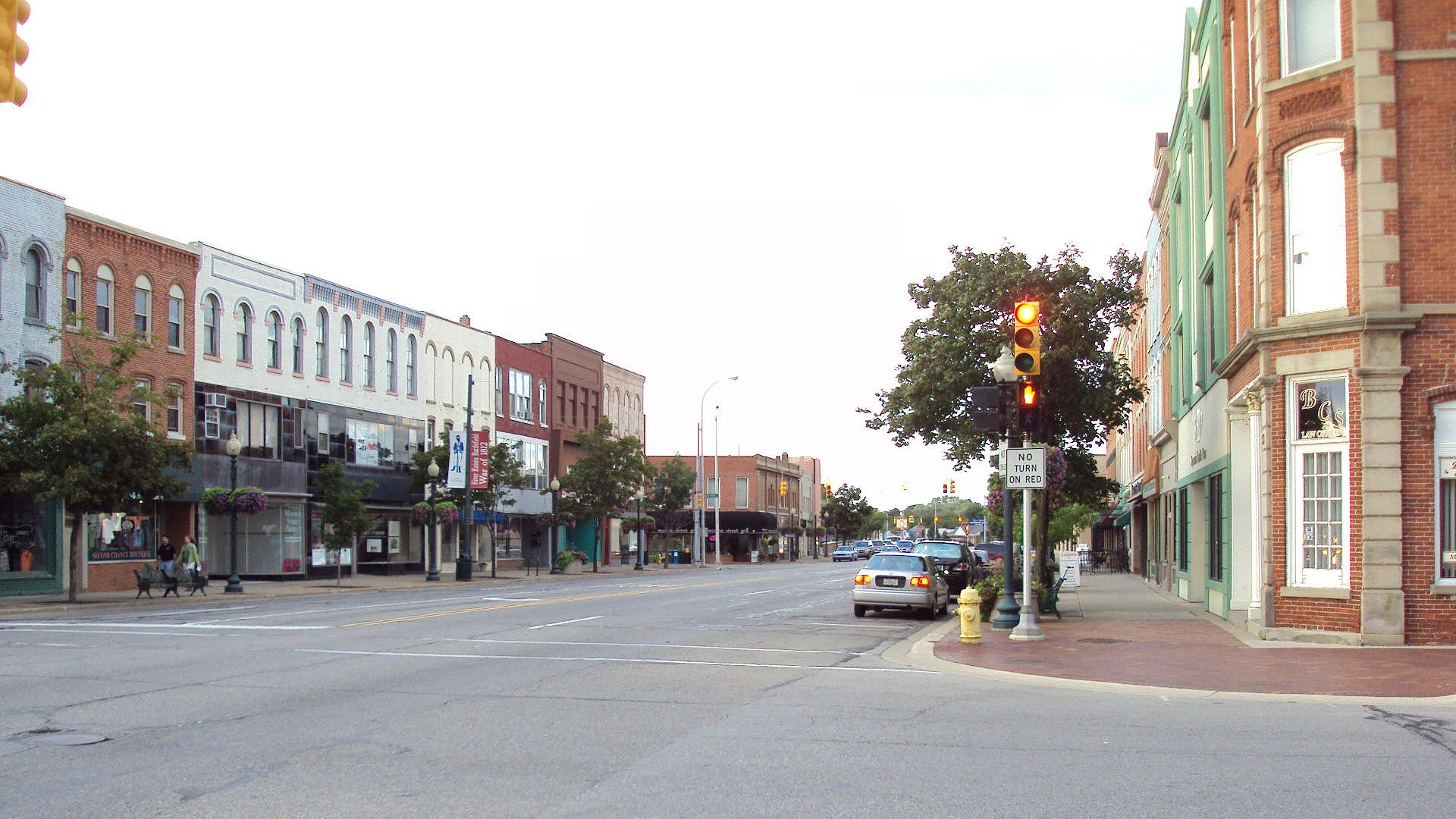
Downtown Monroe, looking north along M-125, known locally as Monroe Street

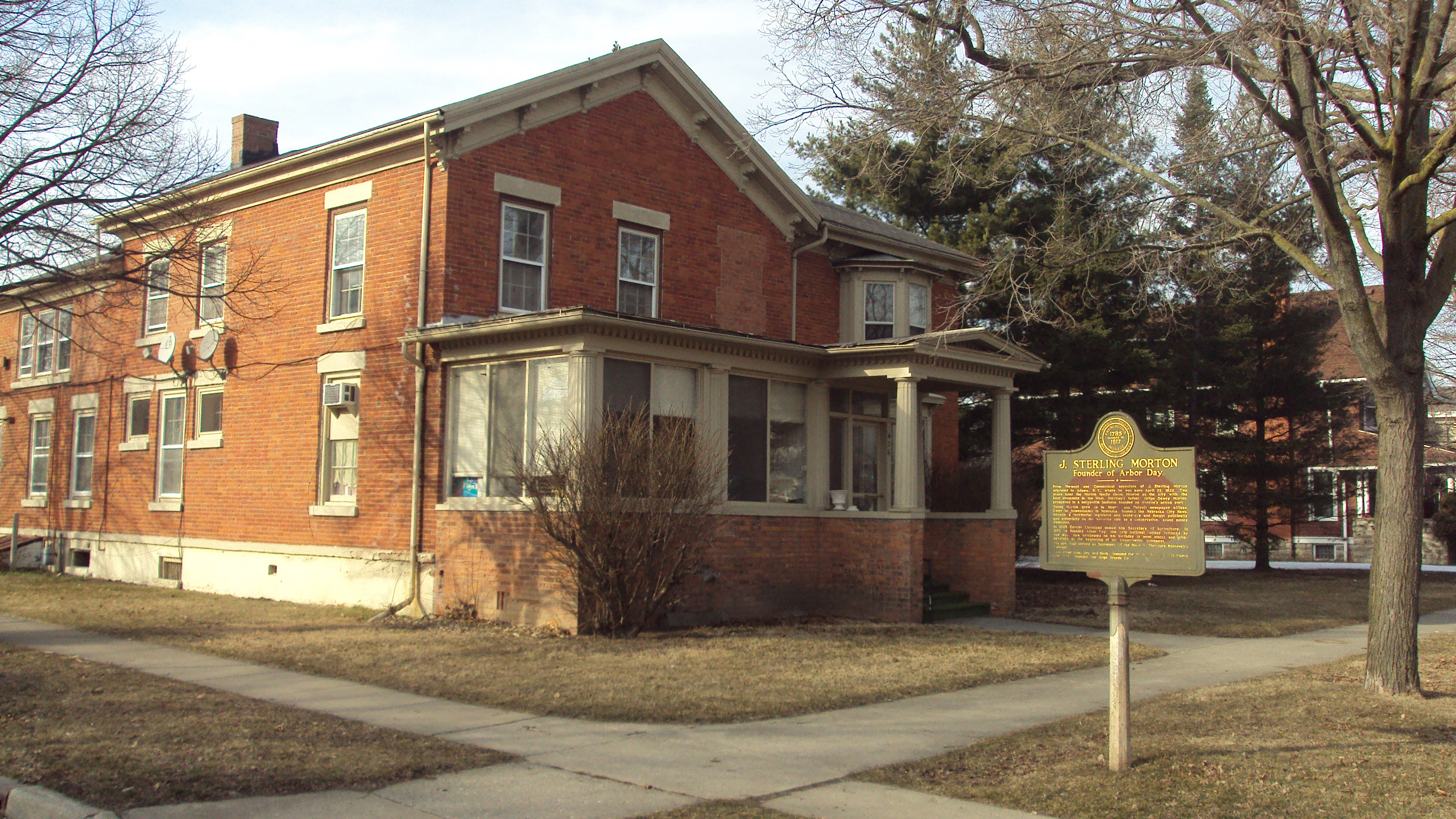
The early childhood home of J. Sterling Morton, located at 85 East Fifth Street

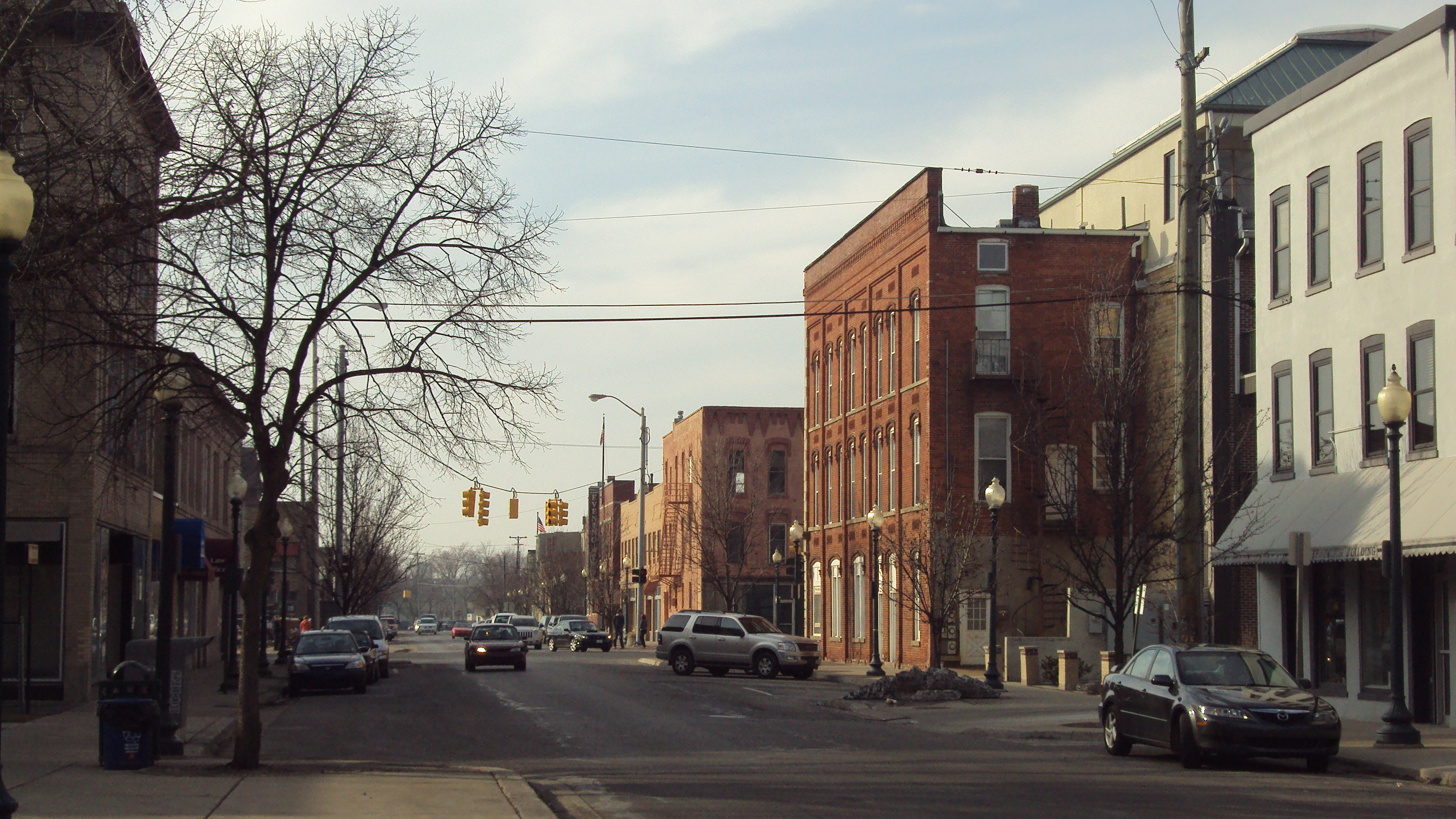
The Old Village Historic District looking west along First Street

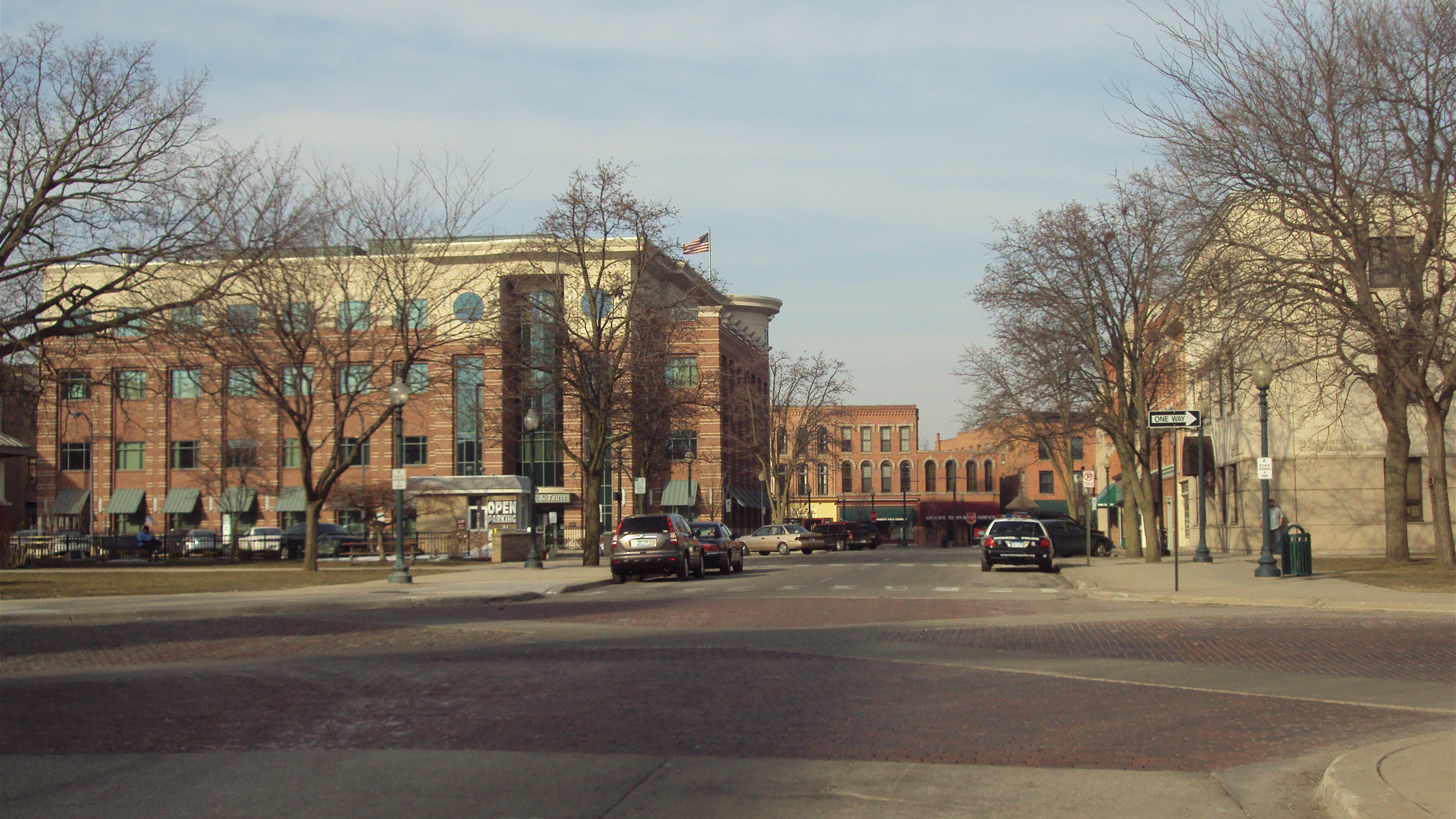
The original location of the Custer statue with MB&T headquarters on the left

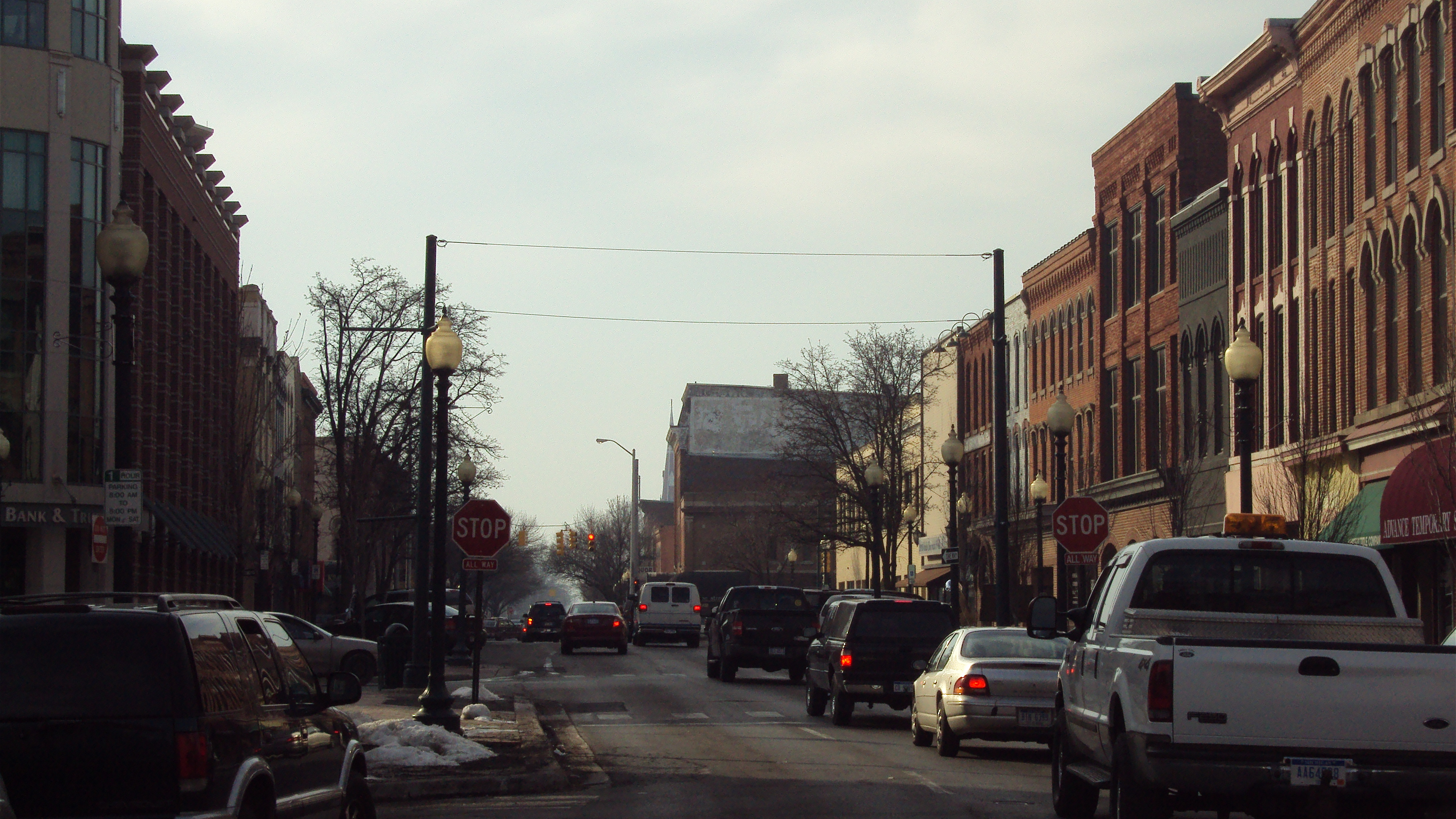
The Old Village Historic District looking west along East Front Street
