= Rudolph Nims House =

Historic house in Michigan, United States

- U.S. National Register of Historic Places
- Michigan State Historic Site
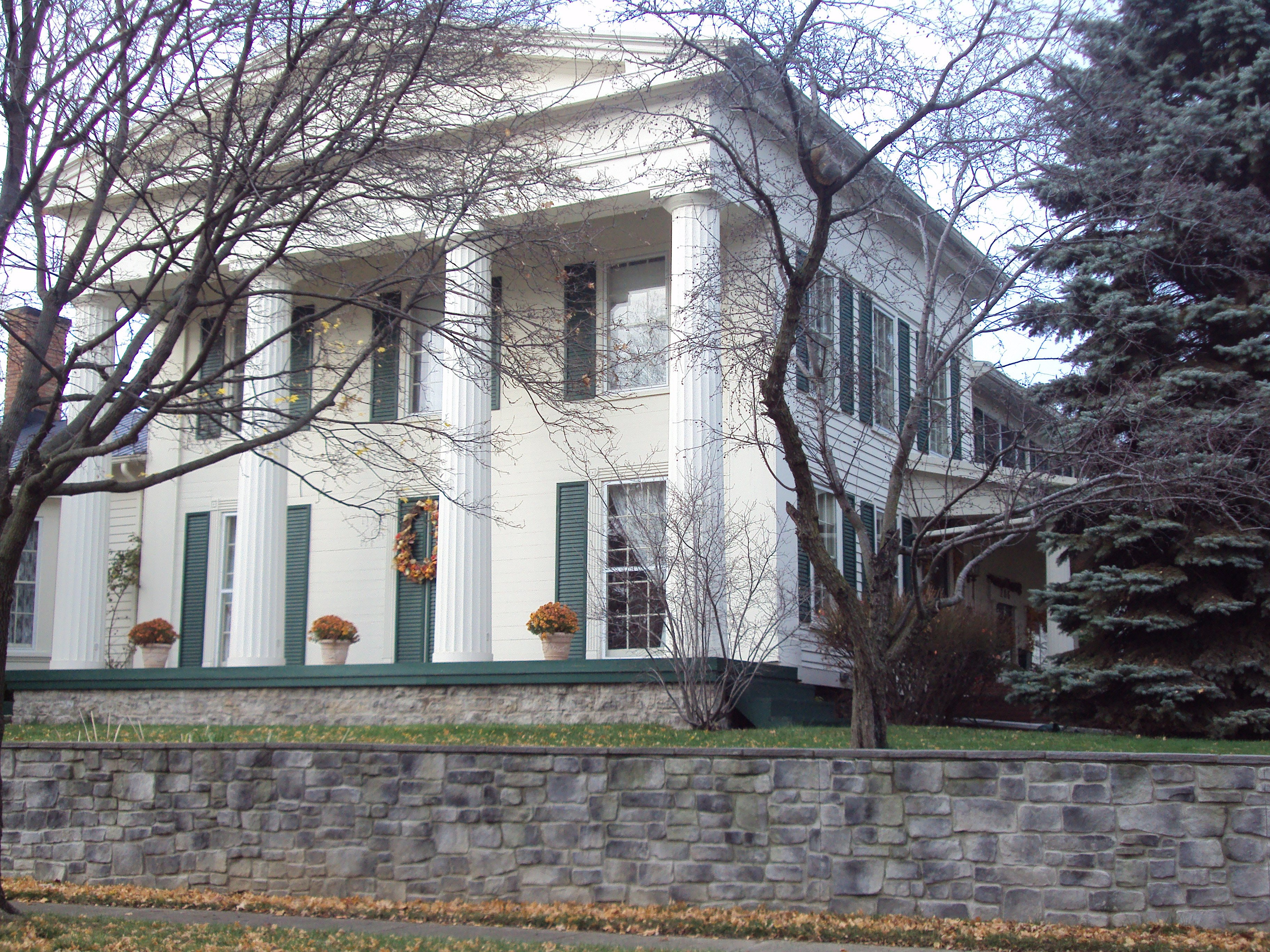

- Location within Michigan Location within the United States
- Interactive map
- Location: 206 West Noble Street; Monroe, Michigan
- Coordinates: 41°55′22″N 83°23′51″W
- Built: 1846
- Architect: Jacques Godfroy
- Architectural style: Greek Revival
- NRHP reference No.: 72000644

Significant dates
- Added to NRHP: October 18, 1972
- Designated MSHS: October 29, 1971

The Rudolph Nims House is a private residence located at 206 West Noble Street in the city of Monroe in Monroe County, Michigan. It was listed as a Michigan Historic Site on October 29, 1971 and added to the National Register of Historic Places on October 18, 1972.

== History ==
The house was built in 1846 by Jacques Godfroy, who acquired the land from a government grant. While the house was built by Godfroy, it is unknown if he ever actually lived in the house. He sold the house to his business partner Rudolph Nims in 1848. Several additions were made to the house in subsequent years, including the addition of a dining room in 1850, another small room in 1863, a summer kitchen in 1911 and a small porch in 1914.

The Nims family owned the house for over a hundred years before selling it. It remains privately owned.

The Rudolph Nims House is a block away from the St. Mary's Church Complex Historic District.

== Description ==
The Rudolph Nims House is a two-story frame Greek Revival structure covered with clapboards. The house measures 32 feet by 32 feet, and sits on a fieldstone foundation. The house has a two-story extension at the rear, as well as a single story addition behind and another to the side. The main section of the house has a gable roof, and separate gable roofs top the additions. Atwo-story Doric portico fronts the house, and separate one-story polygonal one-story entrance porch is located on one side.

The portico shelters a blind recess simulating a door. The recess is flanked by floor-length windows which slide into the wall. Despite the several additions to the house, and the heavy modification of the interior, the front facade has remained unchanged.
