= Navarre–Anderson Trading Post =

- U.S. National Register of Historic Places
- Michigan State Historic Site
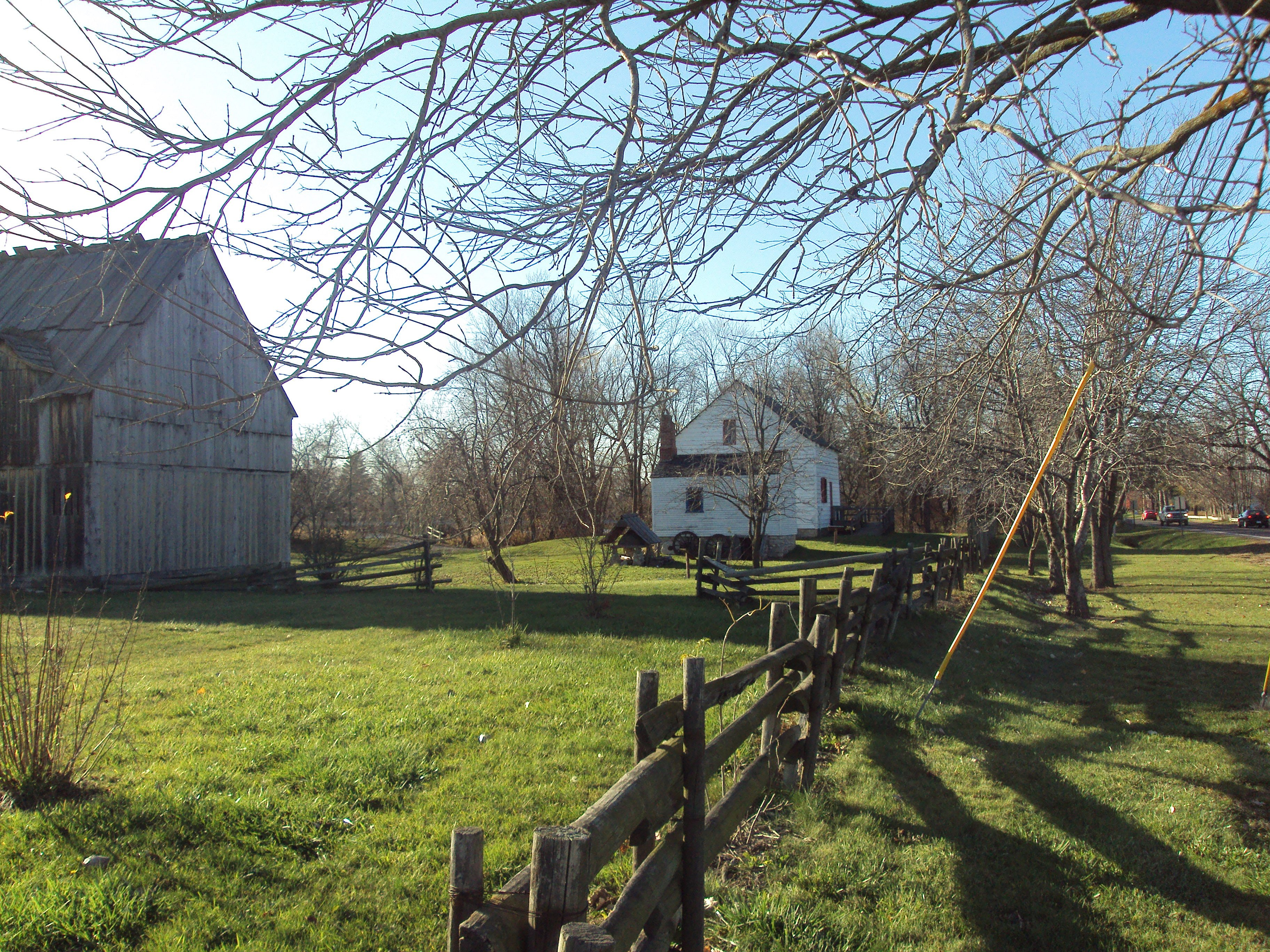

- Location within Michigan Location within the United States
- Interactive map
- Location: 3775 North Custer Road; Frenchtown Charter Township, Michigan
- Coordinates: 41°56′05″N 83°27′35″W
- Built: 1789
- NRHP reference No.: 72000645

Significant dates
- Added to NRHP: July 31, 1972
- Designated MSHS: June 16, 1972

The Navarre–Anderson Trading Post is a former trading post complex located at 3775 North Custer Road in Frenchtown Charter Township along the River Raisin in Monroe County, Michigan. It was listed as a Michigan Historic Site on June 16, 1972 and also listed on the National Register of Historic Places on July 31, 1972.

The main building on the complex dates back to 1789, and is claimed to be the oldest surviving wooden residential building in the state. However, architectural analyses of the Biddle and McGulpin houses on Mackinac Island indicate they could date back as far as 1780. The Navarre–Anderson complex was established by the early French settlers Francois Marie Navarre dit Utreau and John Anderson, who were among the first to settle the area of present-day Monroe. In addition to the main building, which also served as a house, the cookhouse building was built in 1810. The original barn is no longer standing, but a 1790s replica was built on the complex.

The complex was originally located several miles downstream in the present-day Old Village Historic District. When advancing development threatened this historical complex, it was moved in 1894 and again in 1971. The complex was restored back to its appearance from what it looked like 1799. Today, the complex is owned by the Monroe County Historical Museum and is open to the public for special events and group tours.
