= Sawyer House (Monroe, Michigan) =

Historic house in Michigan, United States

- U.S. National Register of Historic Places
- U.S. Historic district – Contributing property
- Michigan State Historic Site
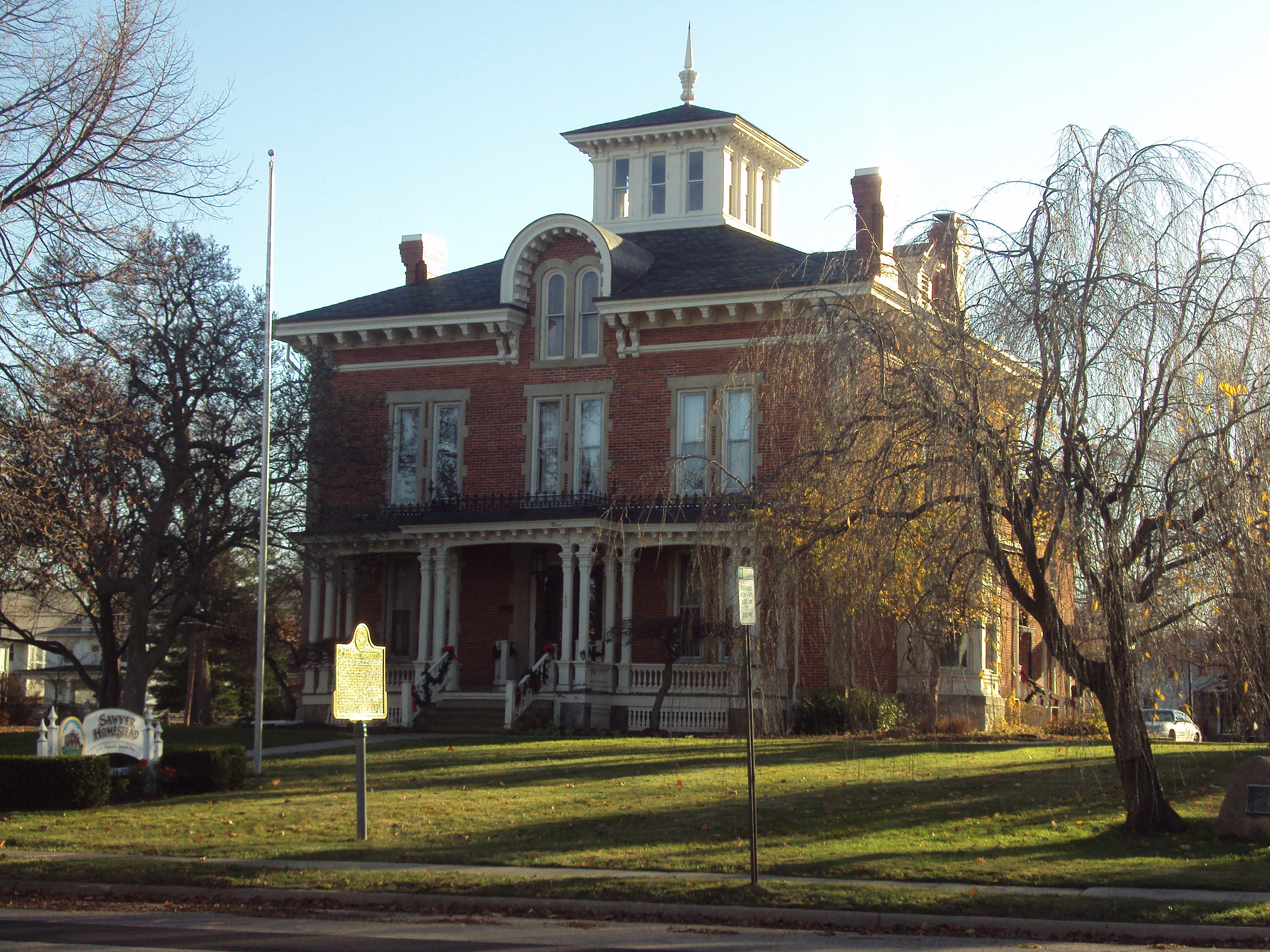

- Location within Michigan Location within the United States
- Interactive map
- Location: 302 East Front Street; Monroe, Michigan
- Coordinates: 41°54′53″N 83°23′36″W
- Built: 1873
- Part of: Old Village Historic District
- NRHP reference No.: 77000721

Significant dates
- Added to NRHP: November 23, 1977
- Designated MSHS: June 19, 1975

The Sawyer House, also known as the Sawyer Homestead and in its previous incarnation as the Navarre House, is a city-owned house located at 320 East Front Street in Monroe, Michigan. It was listed as a Michigan Historic Site on June 19, 1975. The house was listed on the National Register of Historic Places on November 23, 1977, and is also part of the larger Old Village Historic District.

The property was settled in as early as 1785 along the banks of the River Raisin, and it was the first piece of land settled by European explorers. There have been two different houses on the property since 1785. The first house on the property was built by early-French explorer Francois Navarre, who was the first European to settle the area that would later become Monroe. The property was given to Navarre from the native Potawatomi tribe and served as the center of the new settlement. The Navarre House was famously used as the military headquarters for James Winchester, who commanded his troops during the ill-fated Battle of Frenchtown during the War of 1812. The house had several different owners, but its namesake comes from Dr. Alfred Sawyer, who was a famous early proponents of homeopathy. Dr. Sawyer lived on the property from 1859 to 1870. When the Navarre House was demolished in 1873 to make way for the current house, it was the oldest structure in the county.

The Sawyer House, built in Italianate architecture, replaced the Navarre House on the property in 1873. Timbers from the original Navarre House were used to create the stair banister in the Sawyer House. While Dr. Sawyer did not live in the house after 1870, the property remained in his family's ownership. His daughter, Jenny Toll Sawyer, gave the house to the city of Monroe in 1938. The house was used by a variety of organizations, such as the Monroe County Historical Museum, Red Cross, the Camp Fire Girls, and the Boy Scouts. The house stood empty before a group of citizens pooled their private funds and restored the building, and creating an organization whose main reason for existence was the maintenance of the historic structure. Today, the house remains owned by the City of Monroe and is available for public use through the custodial group, called The Sawyer Homestead, a 501(c)3 group who collects rent to fund the house's upkeep.

== Gallery ==
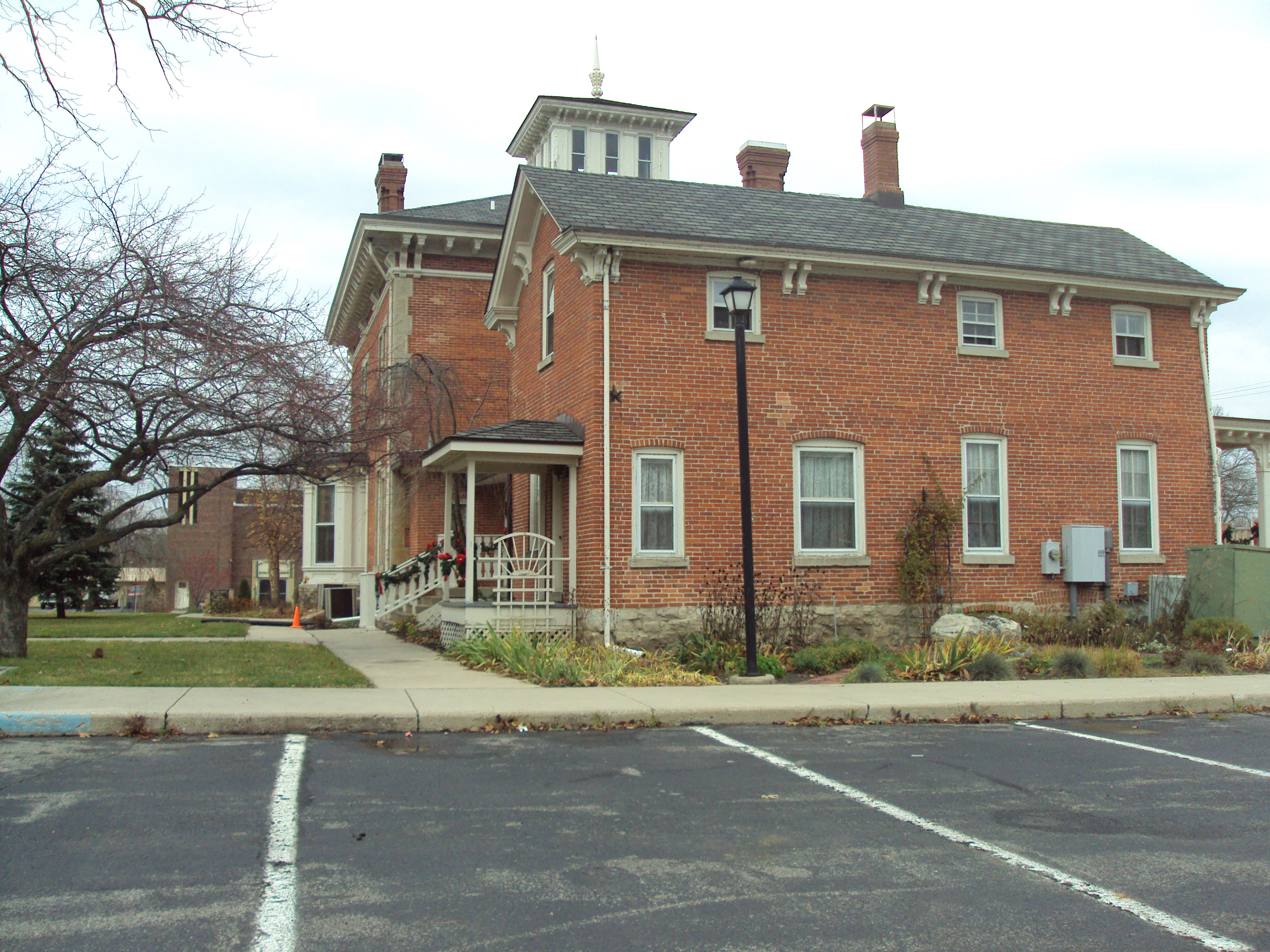

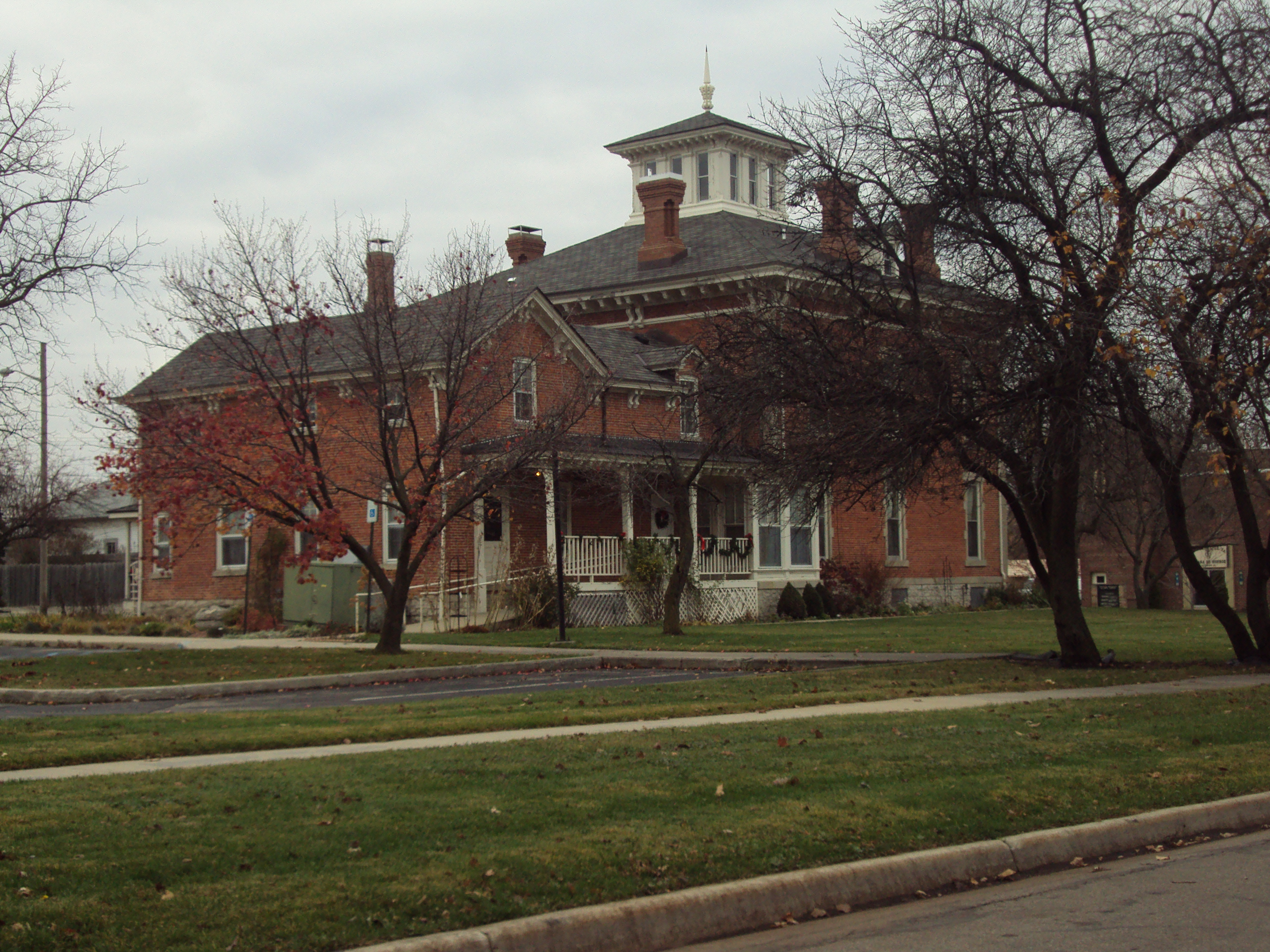

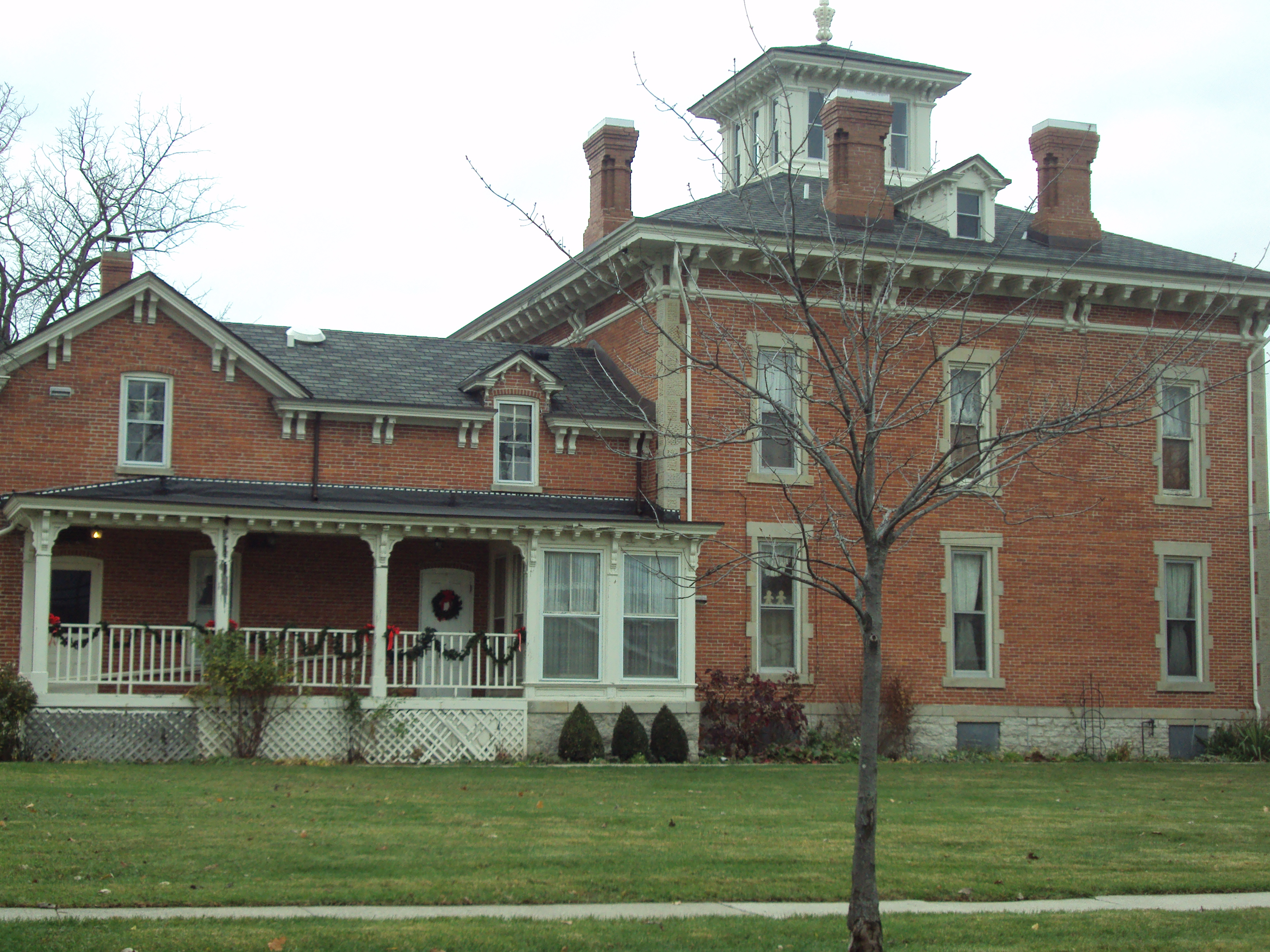

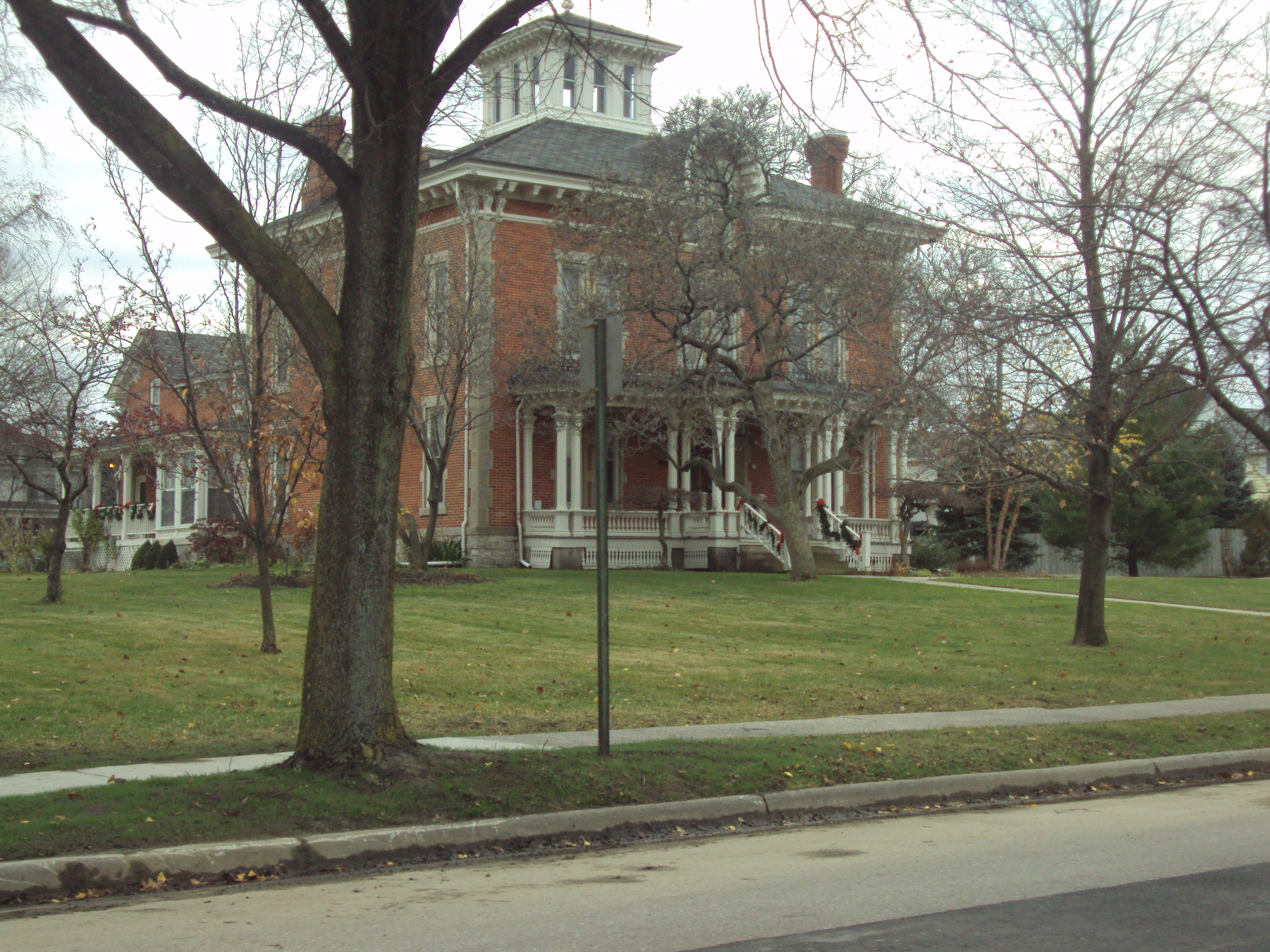
