= St. Mary Catholic Central High School =

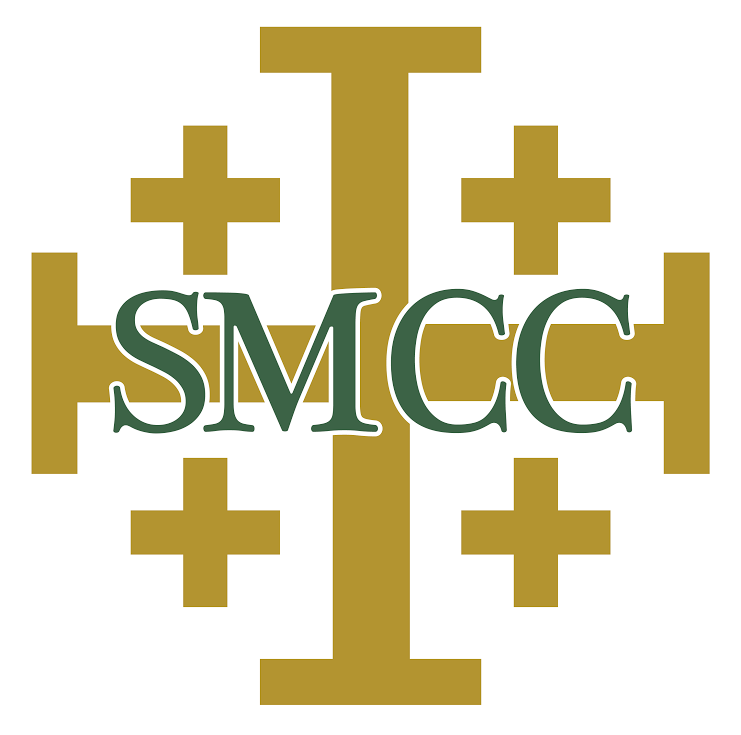

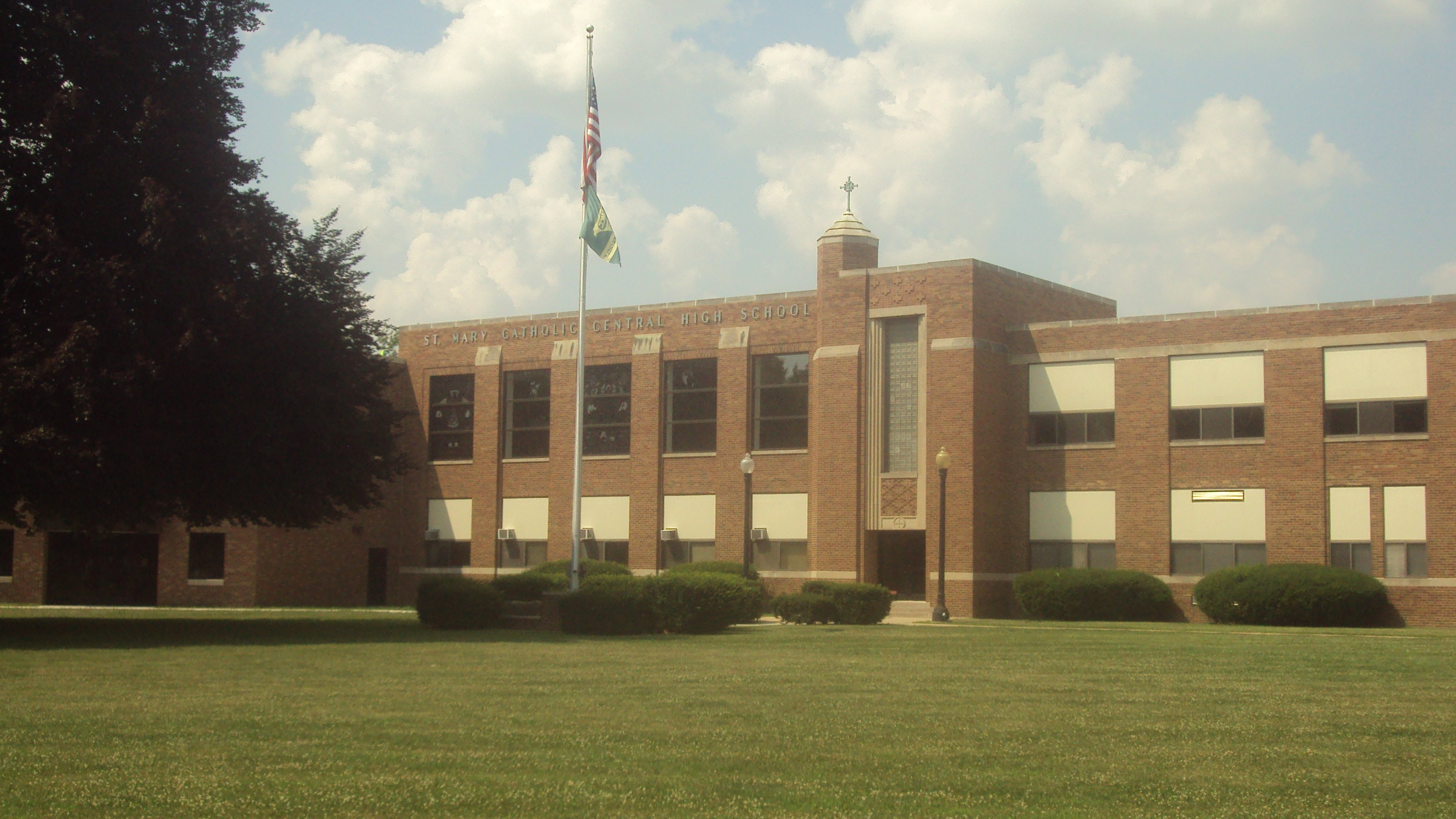

Location
- 108 West Elm Avenue; Monroe, Michigan 48162; United States; 41°55′10″N 83°23′50″W

Information
- Former names: St. Mary Academy (all girls); Monroe Catholic Central (all boys)
- Type: Private
- Motto: Living Faith, Gaining Knowledge, Serving Others
- Religious affiliation: Roman Catholic
- Patron saint: St. Mary
- Established: 1846; 180 years ago
- Founder: Sisters, Servants of the Immaculate Heart of Mary; Brothers of Holy Cross
- School district: Archdiocese of Detroit Catholic Schools
- President: Sean Jorgensen, '91, P '18, '21
- Principal: Joseph Carroll
- Grades: 9–12
- Gender: Coeducational
- Enrollment: 338 (2022–2023)
- Student to teacher ratio: 12:1
- Colors: Green and gold
- Athletics conference: Huron League
- Nickname: Falcons (boys); Kestrels (girls)
- Accreditation: North Central Association of Colleges and Schools
- Yearbook: The Epoch
- Feeder schools: Monroe Catholic Elementary School, St. Charles Newport, St. Patrick Carleton, St. Stephen New Boston, St. Joseph Erie
- Website: www.smccmonroe.com
- St. Mary Catholic Central
- U.S. Historic district – Contributing property
- Location within Michigan Location within the United States
- Built: 1846
- Part of: St. Mary's Church Complex Historic District (ID82002855)

St. Mary Catholic Central High School, known colloquially as SMCC, is a Catholic, co-educational, parochial, secondary school located at 108 West Elm Avenue in Monroe, Michigan. SMCC is sponsored by the Catholic parishes of the Vicariate of Monroe under the auspices of the Roman Catholic Archdiocese of Detroit. The school itself is listed as a contributing property within the St. Mary's Church Complex Historic District.

== About SMCC ==
St. Mary Catholic Central High School is a heritage school formed from the 1986 merger of St. Mary Academy and Monroe Catholic Central. SMCC continues the church's educational tradition in Monroe that began when the Sisters, Servants of the Immaculate Heart of Mary founded St. Mary Academy in 1846. The Brothers of Holy Cross came to Monroe in 1944 to staff Monroe Catholic Central, a new all-boys Catholic secondary school established by the Archdiocese and several local parishes.

The Vicariate of Monroe, which is contiguous with Monroe County borders, has fourteen parishes and five Catholic elementary schools. SMCC has students representing all fourteen parishes. The school is the only Catholic secondary institution in the Vicariate. Further, it is one of only two non-public high schools in Monroe County.

Among the current student body, 68% come from a Catholic elementary school in the Monroe Vicariate or from surrounding Catholic parishes in Huron Township, Downriver Detroit, or Toledo. The remaining 32% comes from local public middle schools, one of three area local Lutheran elementary schools, a public charter school, the local Montessori school, or home-schooled settings.

== Founding ==
The name St. Mary Catholic Central comes from the two schools that formed it: St. Mary Academy (SMA) and Monroe Catholic Central High School (MCC). The merger of the two schools took place in 1986. St. Mary Academy was an all-girls school run by the Sisters, Servants of the Immaculate Heart of Mary, located at 610 West Elm Avenue in Monroe, Michigan. The academy was founded in 1846. Monroe Catholic Central was an all-boys school run by the Brothers of the Holy Cross, located in the building which now houses St. Mary Catholic Central.

The merger between the schools began during the 1986–1987 school year when male and female students began taking classes together in both buildings, which are approximately five blocks apart. During previous years, students were only able to take classes at the other school if a course was not offered at their school. In the inaugural school year of SMCC (1986–1987), the St. Mary Academy building was named “St. Mary Catholic Central West Campus” and the building of Monroe Catholic Central was labeled as “St. Mary Catholic Central East Campus.” The two-campus High School lasted for only one school year. In the 1987–1988 school year, the building of St. Mary Academy was no longer used, with all classes held at the east campus of SMCC which was Monroe Catholic Central.

== Academics ==
SMCC is fully accredited through Cognia. The school offers students a college preparatory program with three levels of learning, including Honors/AP, College Prep, and Concepts levels.

All students have iPads. SMCC became one of the first schools in the nation to fully implement the use of digital textbooks in place of traditional hardcover or softcover texts.

The school has 24 faculty members, four administrators, six full and part-time student service staff members, and 10 full and part-time support staff.

== Athletics ==
SMCC offers athletic opportunities in 23 sports programs. Male and female athletes compete as members of 35 teams on the varsity, junior varsity, and freshman level. SMCC teams are part of the Michigan High School Athletic Association, and the Huron League. The boys' teams continue to use the nickname Falcons and the girls' teams use the nickname Kestrels, as they had prior to the merger.

SMCC has claimed 17 state championships and has finished as state runner up on 12 other occasions. The state championships include seven titles in girls volleyball, four football state championships, two wrestling state championships, three softball state championships, and one girls track and field state championship.

== Notable alumni ==
- Randy Richardville, former Michigan State Senate Majority Leader
- Paul W. Smith, radio presenter, morning drive-time host at 760am WJR radio since 1996
