= East Elm–North Macomb Street Historic District =

Historic district in Michigan, United States

- East Elm–North Macomb Street; Historic District
- U.S. National Register of Historic Places
- U.S. Historic district
- Michigan State Historic Site
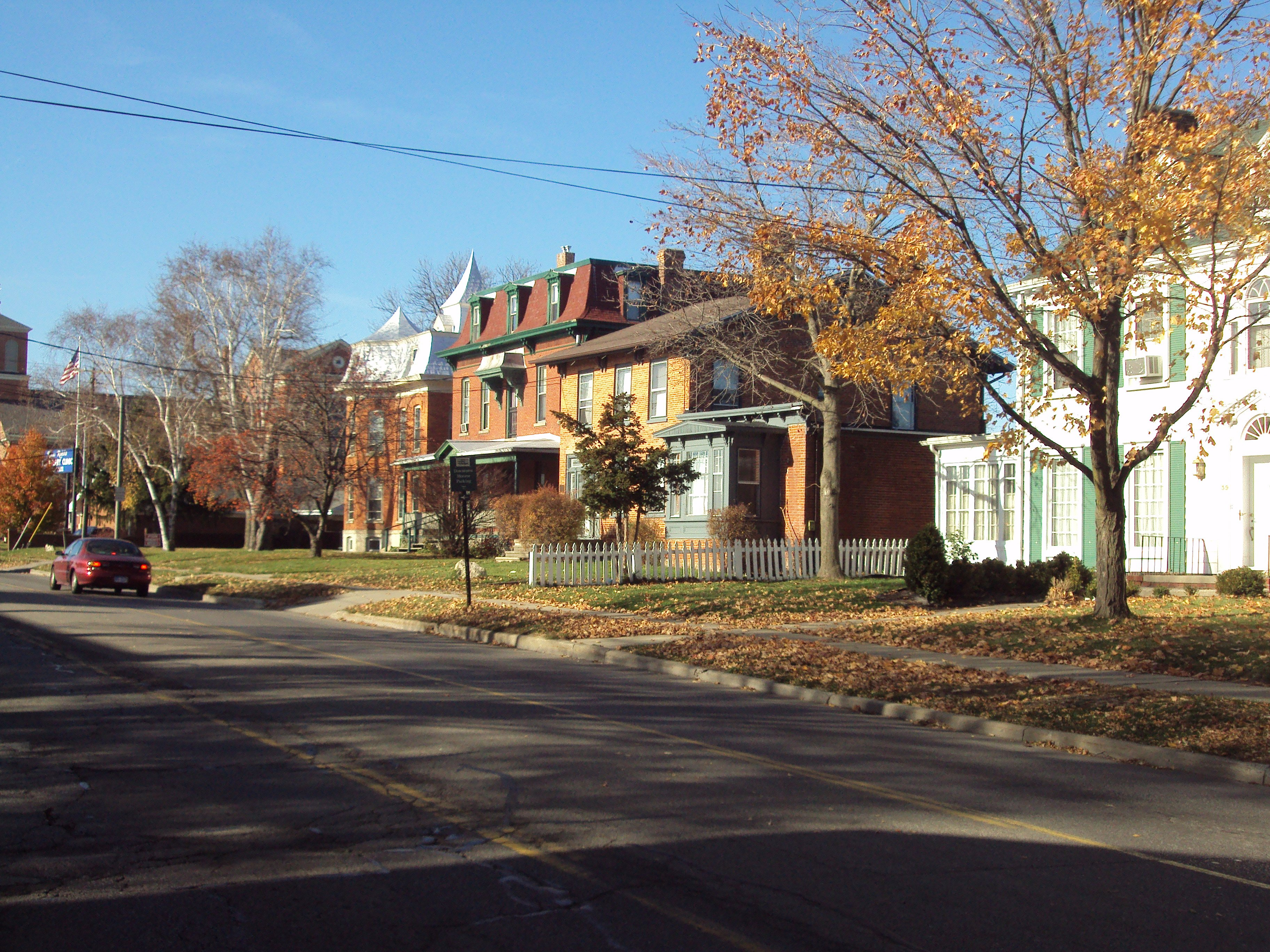
- The historic district along East Elm Avenue

- Location within Michigan Location within the United States
- Interactive map
- Location: Monroe, Michigan
- Coordinates: 41°55′12″N 83°23′36″W
- Area: 0.75 mi^{2} (1.9 km^{2})
- NRHP reference No.: 82002853
- Added to NRHP: May 6, 1982

The East Elm–North Macomb Street Historic District is a residential historic district located in the city of Monroe in Monroe County, Michigan. The district was listed as a Michigan Historic Site and added to the National Register of Historic Places on May 6, 1982.

This district comprises approximately 0.75 square miles (1.9 km^{2}), bordering the River Raisin on the south and North Monroe Street (M-125) on the west. The district extends to the north to East Lorain Street and to the east to North Macomb Street. Streets within the district also include Tremont, East Willow, East Vine, East Noble, Gee, Sackett, and Glendale.

== History ==
Some of the houses in this district date back to 1820, when the district was first developed as houses were constructed along the river road (now Elm Avenue) near the Monroe Street bridge. Later in the 19th century, more suburban houses appeared north of Elm. The district was gradually platted over the next century as an exclusively residential zone. The area became a prestigious neighborhood due to its attractive topography and easy access to the downtown. By the 1920s, the area was completely built up.

== Description ==
The district includes a wide array of Greek Revival, Federal, Second Empire, and Victorian architecture, as well as some twentieth century bungalows and Prairie-influenced houses. The majority of the properties in this district are privately owned houses and range from large mansions to lower-class dwellings and apartments, while small businesses line the stretch along North Monroe Street.

The core of the district contains two 1836 plats, with a series of fine residential mansions along Elm Avenue. A few early suburban houses are still scattered north of Elm. The remainder of the district contains more modest houses built during the latter part of the 19th century and the early 20th century.

The Governor Robert McClelland House, which is also listed on the National Register of Historic Places, is located within this district at 47 East Elm Street. Robert McClelland lived in this house briefly when he served as mayor of Monroe in 1841 before leaving to embark in national politics. The East Elm–North Macomb Street Historic District is also located across North Monroe Street from the St. Mary's Church Complex Historic District and adjacent to the George Armstrong Custer Equestrian Monument.
