= George Armstrong Custer Equestrian Monument =

Statue in Monroe, Michigan, United States

- George Armstrong Custer; Equestrian Monument
- U.S. National Register of Historic Places
- Michigan State Historic Site
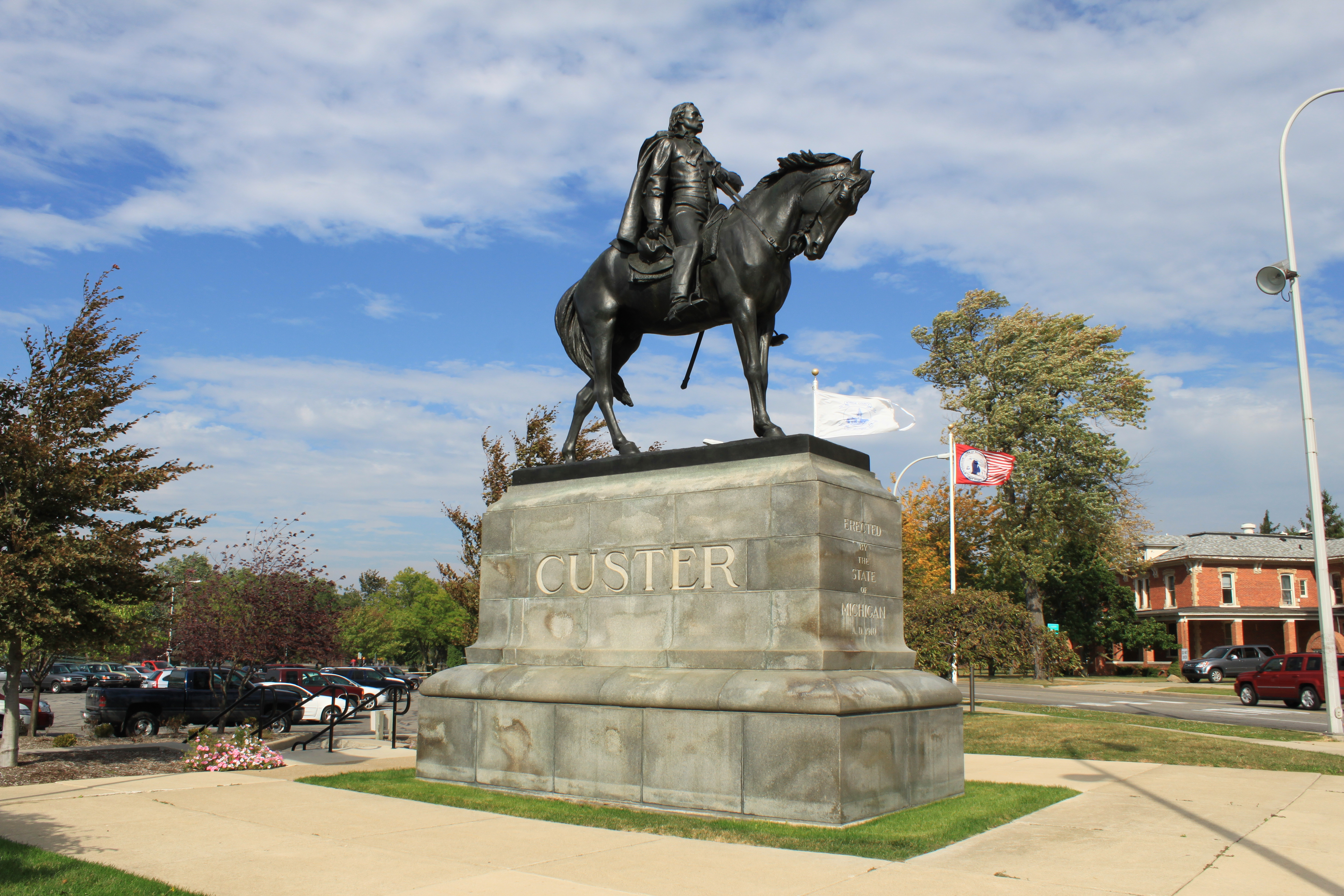

- Location within Michigan Location within the United States
- Interactive map
- Location: Junction of Elm Avenue and North Monroe Street; Monroe, Michigan
- Coordinates: 41°55′05″N 83°23′48″W
- Built: 1910
- Architect: Hunt & Hunt
- Sculptor: Edward Clark Potter
- NRHP reference No.: 94001430

Significant dates
- Added to NRHP: December 9, 1994
- Designated MSHS: June 15, 1992

The George Armstrong Custer Equestrian Monument, also known as Sighting the Enemy, is a 1910 equestrian statue of General George Armstrong Custer located in Monroe, Michigan. The statue, sculpted by Edward Clark Potter, was designated as a Michigan Historic Site on June 15, 1992 and soon after listed on the National Register of Historic Places on December 9, 1994.

== Background ==
While Custer was not born in Monroe, he lived much of his early childhood there with relatives and attended the schools in Monroe. During his youth, he met his future wife Elizabeth Bacon, whom he returned to marry in 1864. Custer left Monroe to attend the United States Military Academy and fight in the Civil War. Because of his hard work and success during the war—as well as the Union's need for officers—he was promoted to the rank of major general and became a very well-known military figure. After the Civil War, he fought in the Indian Wars in the West. His previous accomplishments in the Civil War, however, were overshadowed by his catastrophic defeat and death at the Battle of the Little Big Horn on June 25, 1876.

To honor him, a $24,000, 14-foot (4.27 m) bronze equestrian statue, sculpted by Edward Clark Potter, was unveiled in Monroe in June 1910 by President William Howard Taft and the widowed Elizabeth Bacon Custer. The statue commemorates his successful actions during the Civil War and not his more well-known defeat in 1876.

== Location ==
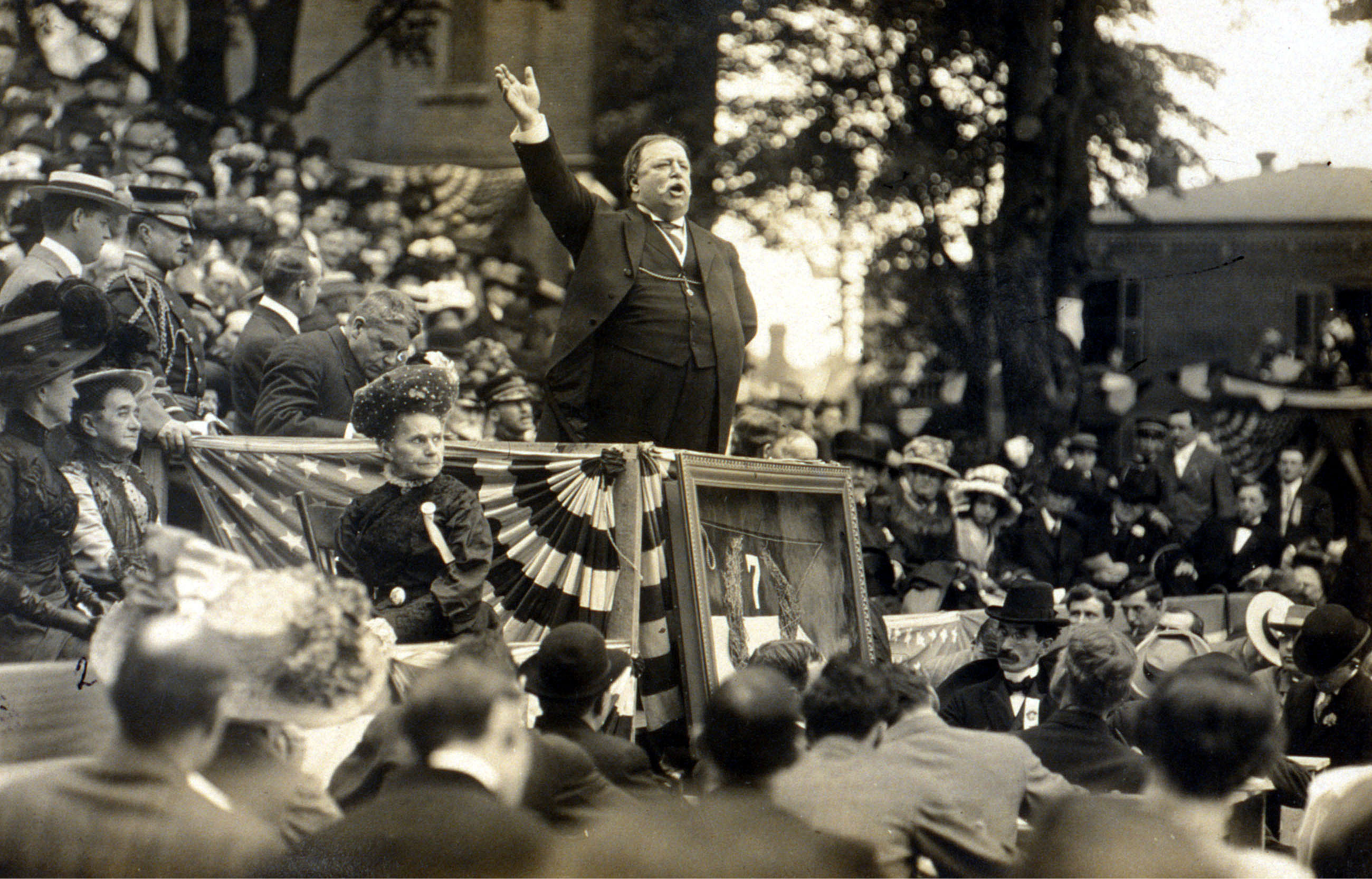
President Taft speaks to a crowd at the unveiling of the statue in 1910. Elizabeth Bacon Custer is pictured just below Taft to his right.

In the century since the statue was installed, it has been placed at three different sites. It was originally located in the middle of the brick-paved intersection of First and Washington streets in front of the courthouse; this area is part of the present-day Old Village Historic District. His widow Elizabeth Custer, who spent much of her later life improving Custer's reputation and public image, argued that the statue deserved a better location. Some residents complained that it was a traffic hazard in the middle of an intersection. When the statue was first erected, traffic was sparse in Monroe, but automobile traffic was markedly increasing. On June 20, 1923, the statue was moved to a new location in Soldiers and Sailors Park along the River Raisin. There, the statue stood in relative isolation and was eventually obscured by unkempt scrubs and trees.

Because of public protests, the city moved the statue to a better location in August 1955. When movers arrived to take the statue to a new location, they originally could not find it within the overgrown vegetation. The statue was moved to its current location on the southwest corner of Elm Avenue and North Monroe Street along the River Raisin. This is one of the most prominent intersections in the city, and the statue is well-lit at night. The statue is now one of the most recognizable objects in Monroe. The George Armstrong Custer Equestrian Monument is located across Elm Street from the St. Mary's Church Complex Historic District and adjacent to the East Elm-North Macomb Street Historic District.

== Monument ==
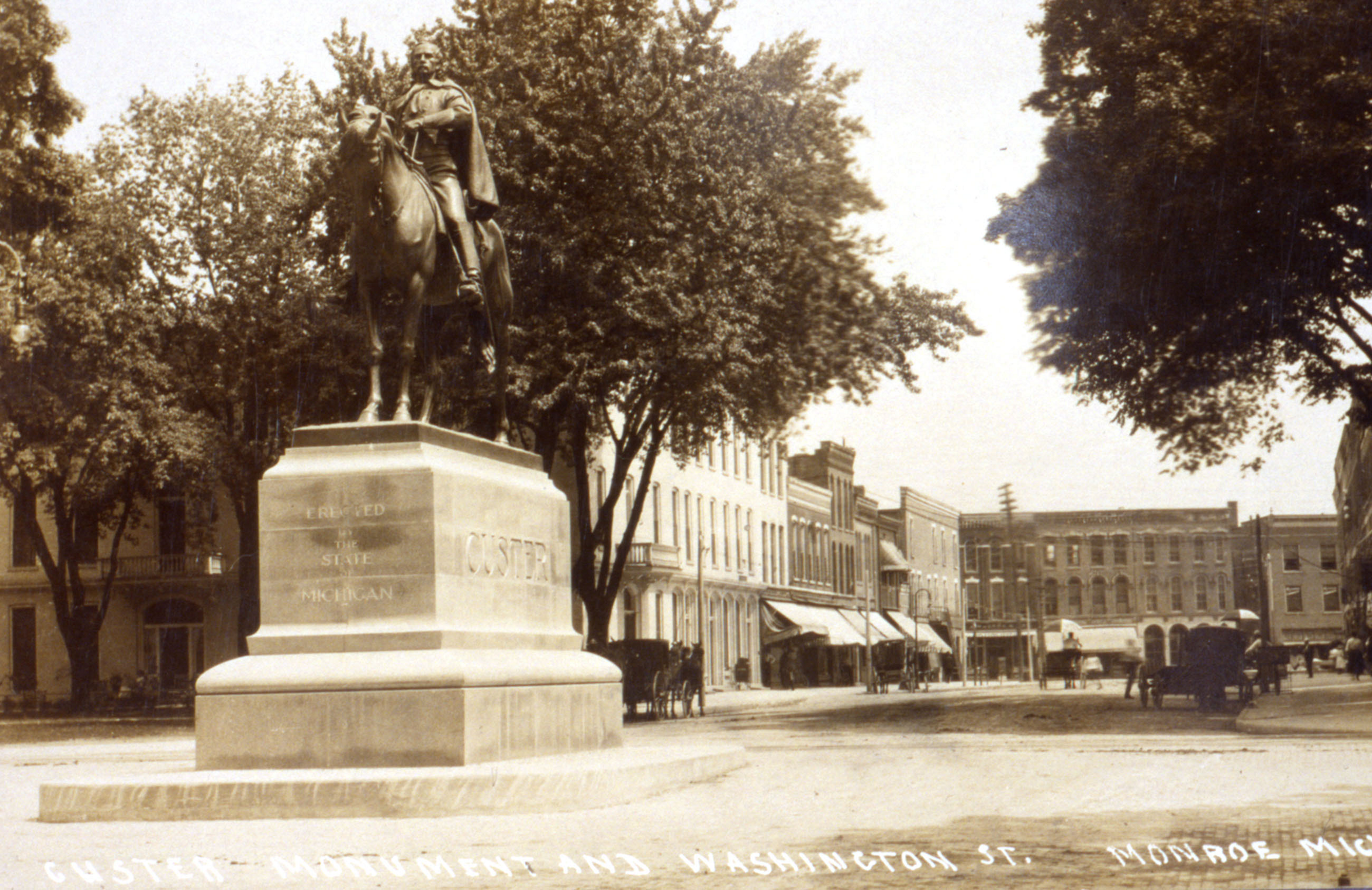
The statue in its original location at Washington and First Street in 1910

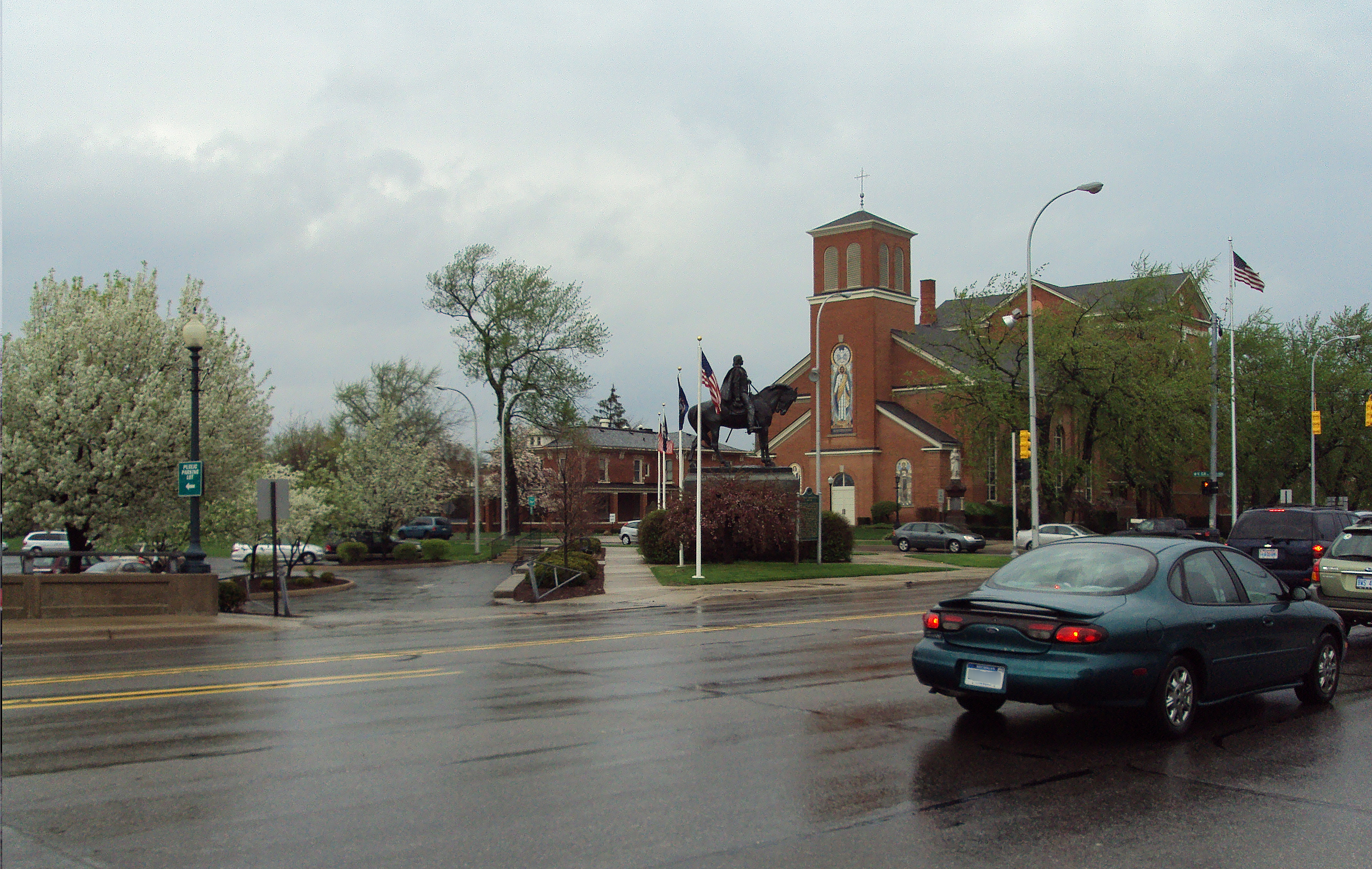
The statue in its current location at the corner of Elm Street and North Monroe Street

Proponents of the statue argue that it commemorates Custer's spectacular service to the Union during the Civil War and not his failure at the Battle of the Little Big Horn. The statue shows Custer wearing his Civil War uniform. In keeping with sculptural convention, his horse has all four feet on the ground, as Custer did not die during that period of service. The historical marker commemorating the statue reads:

Born in New Rumley, Ohio, George A. Custer grew up in Monroe in the home of his half-sister, Mrs. David Reed. On February 9, 1864, in the Presbyterian Church here, he married Libbie Bacon, the only daughter of Judge and Mrs. Daniel S. Bacon. During the Civil War, Custer served with distinction, including at the Battle of Gettysburg. He received six brevets and was made brigadier-general before he was 26 years old, a rare distinction. From 1866 until his death at the Battle of the Little Big Horn, Custer commanded the famous Seventh Cavalry Regiment, leading them in scouting and Indian fighting throughout Kansas and the Dakota Territory. His rank at death was lieutenant colonel, as he reverted to colonel from brigadier general at the end of the Civil War. (He was promoted to lieutenant colonel in 1866, at Ft Riley, Kansas.) This statue of General Custer, created by Edward C. Potter, was erected by the State of Michigan, unveiled by Mrs. Elizabeth B. Custer and dedicated by President William Howard Taft on June 4, 1910. The statue was rededicated September 3, 1955, by the members of the First Cavalry Division, of which Custer's Seventh Cavalry Regiment was a part.
