= Governor Robert McClelland House =

Historic house in Michigan, United States

- U.S. National Register of Historic Places
- U.S. Historic district – Contributing property
- Michigan State Historic Site
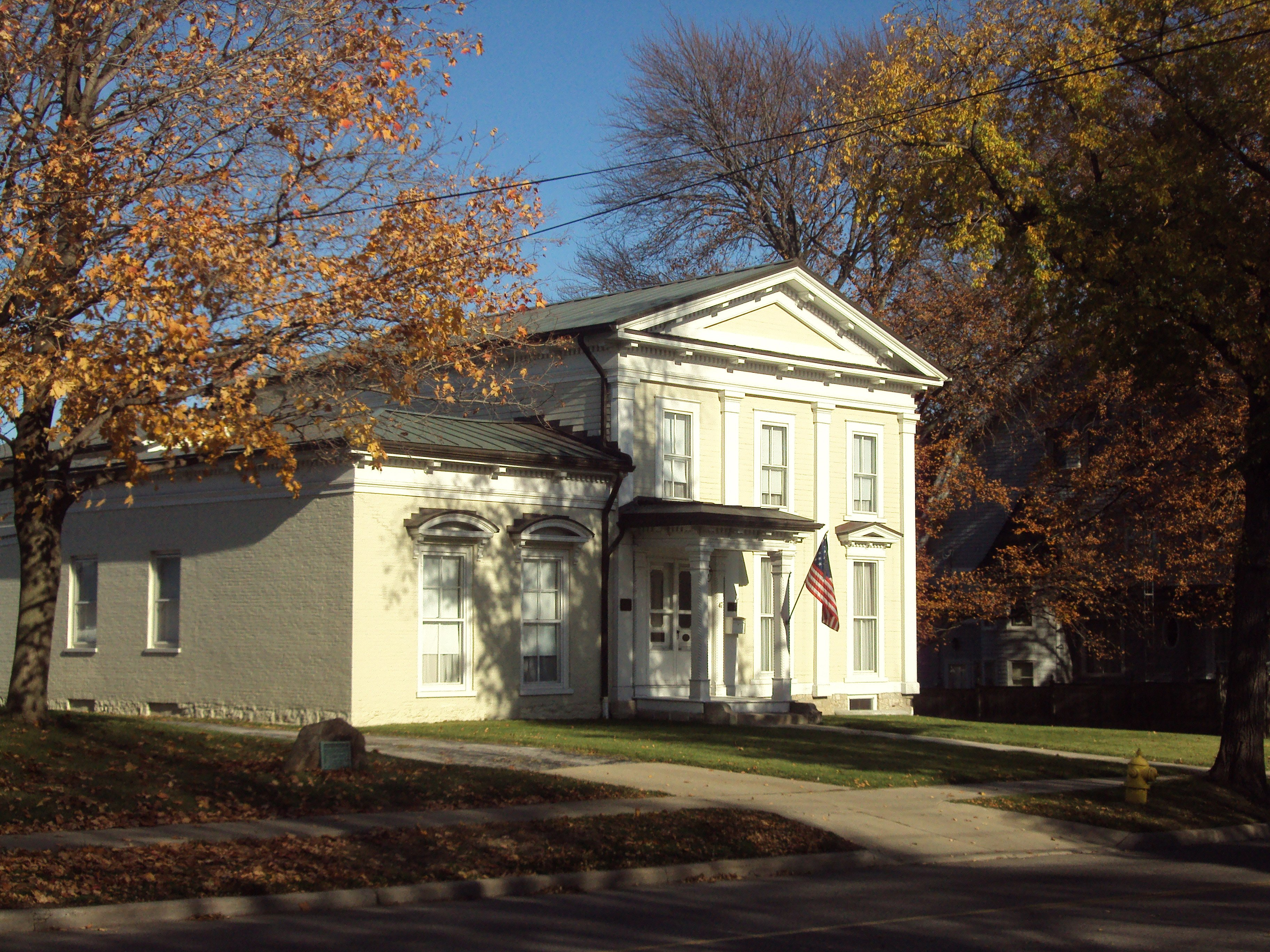

- Location within Michigan Location within the United States
- Interactive map
- Location: 47 East Elm Avenue; Monroe, Michigan
- Coordinates: 41°55′04″N 83°23′40″W
- Built: 1841
- Part of: East Elm-North Macomb Street Historic District
- NRHP reference No.: 71000415

Significant dates
- Added to NRHP: September 3, 1971
- Designated MSHS: March 3, 1971

The Governor Robert McClelland House is a private residence located at 47 East Elm Avenue in the city of Monroe in Monroe County, Michigan. It was listed as a Michigan Historic Site on March 3, 1971, and it was the first property in the county to be listed on the National Register of Historic Places on September 3, 1971.

The house was named in honor of famed politician Robert McClelland, who owned the house from 1841 to 1853. Today, the house is also part of the larger East Elm-North Macomb Street Historic District and is located in its original location just east of North Monroe Street (M-125) and across East Elm Avenue from the River Raisin in one of the oldest sections of Monroe.

== History ==
The property on which this house sites was first platted in 1836. It was sold to Robert McClelland in about 1841, then mayor of Monroe. The house was built in 1841 for McClelland. McClelland was a very well known local and state politician and eventually rose to national politics. He left Monroe to serve in the United States House of Representatives, representing Michigan's 1st congressional district from 1843 to 1849. McClelland maintained ownership of the house even after he was elected Governor of Michigan in 1852. It was from this position that he was selected by President Franklin Pierce to be his Secretary of the Interior in 1853.

At that point, McClelland sold his house to local merchant Benjamin Dansard. The entire western portion of the house, which contains a library, bedroom, kitchen, and dining room, was not part of the original house and was later added by Dansard. Dansard died in 1888, but the house remained in the family until 1917, when it was sold to Kirke G. Bumpus.

Today, the house is privately owned.

== Description ==
The house is a Greek Revival architecture structure. The front entrance was originally off-centered and surrounded by balusters, but these were removed with the addition of the west wing.
