= St. Mary's Church Complex Historic District (Monroe, Michigan) =

Historic church in Michigan, United States

- U.S. National Register of Historic Places
- U.S. Historic district
- Michigan State Historic Site
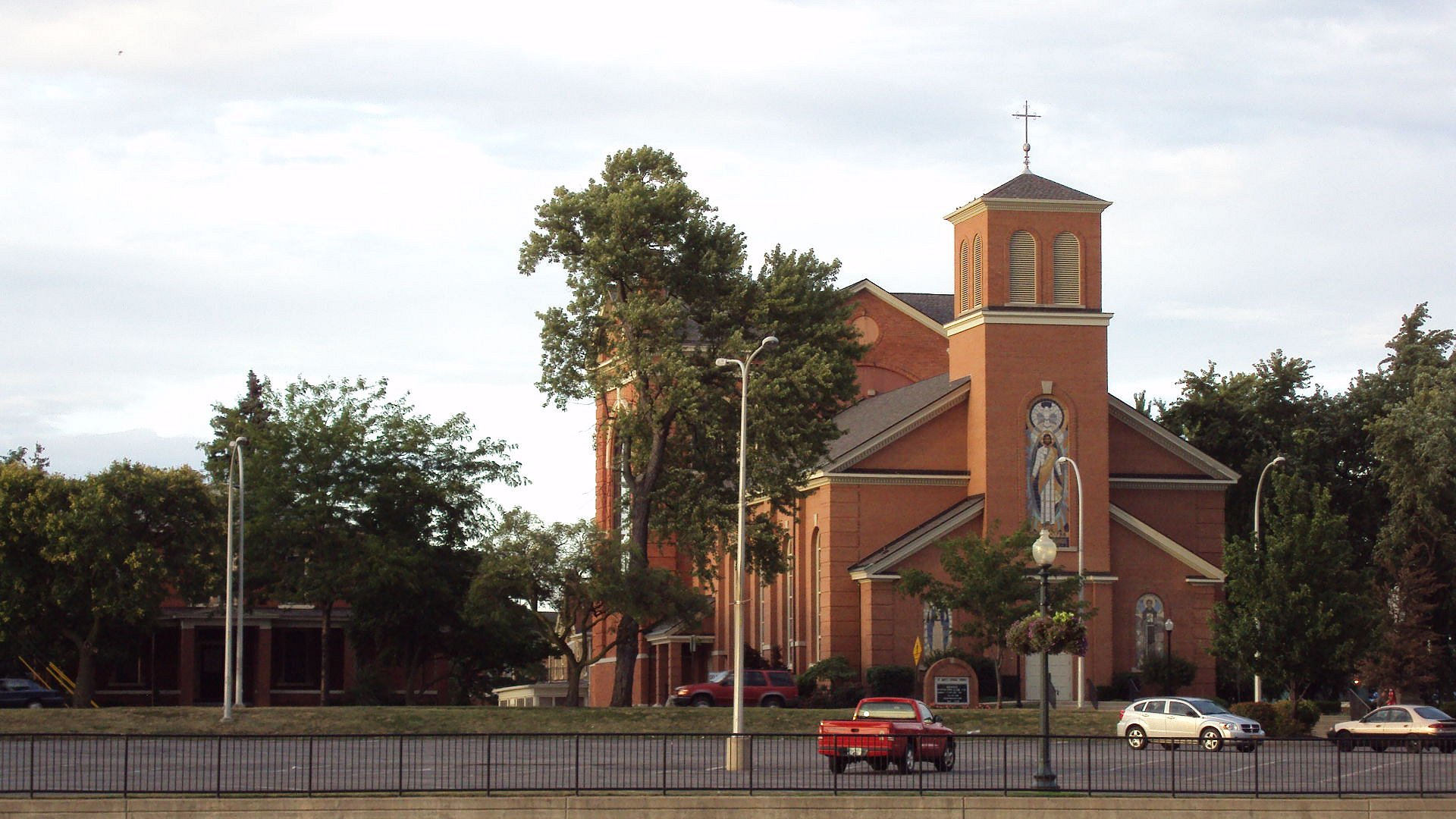
- St. Mary Church from across the River Raisin

- Location within Michigan Location within the United States
- Interactive map
- Location: East Elm Avenue and North Monroe Street; Monroe, Michigan
- Coordinates: 41°55′08″N 83°23′48″W
- Area: 60 acres (24 ha)
- Built: 1834; 192 years ago
- NRHP reference No.: 82002855
- Added to NRHP: May 6, 1982

The St. Mary's Church Complex Historic District is a historic district located at the junction of Elm Avenue and North Monroe Street (M-125) in the city of Monroe, Michigan. It was listed as a Michigan Historic Site and added to the National Register of Historic Places on May 6, 1982.

The complex consists of four buildings. The centerpiece of the district is St. Mary Church at 117 North Monroe Street. The church traces its origins to St. Antoine aux Rivière Raisin, which was founded by ethnic French Canadians on October 15, 1788. It is the oldest church in Monroe County. The current site was constructed in 1834, consecrated in 1839, and renamed in 1845. That year, the church fell under the leadership of the Roman Catholic Archdiocese of Detroit.

The Sisters, Servants of the Immaculate Heart of Mary (IHM) was founded in Monroe the same year. Its first Mother Superior was Theresa Maxis Duchemine, an African-American woman of Haitian descent who was born in Baltimore. She was a founding member there of the Oblate Sisters of Providence, the first African-American religious order in the United States. Catholic churches had been founded in the 18th century by French Canadians in the Detroit area and across the Detroit River in Canada.

In 1846, St. Mary Academy, an all-girls educational facility, was built down the road from the church. Monroe Catholic Central was an all-boys school built next to the main church. These two schools merged in 1986 to form the coeducational St. Mary Catholic Central (SMCC) high school. It was based in the Monroe Catholic Central building, which had been expanded next to the church at 108 West Elm Avenue. The school continues to operate at that site. It is the largest building in the historic district and the largest private school in the county.

The original church building was not changed from its completion in 1839 until it was expanded in 1903. he Brothers of the Holy Cross residential building was constructed in 1870. The St. Mary Parochial Elementary School was completed in 1903. The current rectory was added to the north side of the church in the 1920s. Each of these buildings has its own unique architecture. Except for some additions to the SMCC building, the remaining buildings in the complex have remained largely unchanged since the 1920s.

The St. Mary's Church Complex Historic District is bordered to the west by Borgess Avenue, to the north by West Willow Street, to the south by Elm Avenue, and to the east by North Monroe Street (M-125). It occupies an area of about 60 acres (24 hectares). The district is located across Elm Avenue from the George Armstrong Custer Equestrian Monument and across North Monroe Street from the East Elm-North Macomb Street Historic District. The church complex is also located just across the River Raisin from the Old Village Historic District.
