= Monroe County Intermediate School District =

School district in Michigan, United States

Coordinates: 41°55′26″N 83°28′01″W

Location
- Monroe County, Michigan

District information
- Type: Intermediate
- Motto: Preparing Today's Students for Tomorrow's World
- Superintendent: Stephen McNew
- Budget: $40,672,005

Other information
- Assistant Superintendents: Joshua Dyer; Lisa Montrief; Elizabeth Taylor; Michelle Brahaney
- Website: Official website

The Monroe County Intermediate School District (commonly abbreviated as the Monroe County ISD or MCISD) is an intermediate school district that provides educational services throughout Monroe County, Michigan. The ISD provides numerous services to all nine of Monroe County's public schools, as well as two public charter schools and 15 private schools. The ISD also provides educational services for adjudicated youth at the Monroe County Youth Center and works with other government agencies, charitable organizations (such as United Way), Monroe County Community College, and the county's library system.

While the Monroe County ISD serves all schools in Monroe County, its boundary is not conterminous with Monroe County and follows the district lines drawn by the county's public schools. Certain portions of Monroe County, especially those in the northern portions near Milan, Flat Rock, and South Rockwood, are within the boundaries of schools in Wayne County and are incorporated into the Wayne County RESA. Not all students in Monroe County attend a school in Monroe County and therefore are not under the ISD's jurisdiction. At the same time, the ISD provides services for those out-of-county students who attend schools in Monroe County — most notably Whiteford Agricultural Schools and Airport Community Schools, who have boundaries extending into neighboring counties.

== Main campus ==
While the Monroe County Intermediate School District works through numerous other schools, their main campus is located in Monroe Charter Township on South Raisinville Road just south of M-50 and down the street from Monroe County Community College. The campus provides numerous educational services, though the only students who regularly attend school on the main campus are those with severe impairments who require specialized assistance. The ISD also employs numerous staff and teachers who work in other schools. These employees include special education teachers, special education aides, paraprofessional educators (such as speech and language pathologists and social workers), and substitute teachers. While employed through the ISD, these workers may work in any of the schools in which the ISD provides services. Many teachers and other employees throughout the county often meet at the ISD's main campus for conferencing and professional development. The Monroe County Intermediate School District runs independently of other districts in the county, and the ISD itself receives its funding through the government. The ISD consists of its own Board of Directors, led by superintendent Stephen McNew and assistant superintendents Joshua Dyer, Lisa Montrief, Elizabeth Taylor, and Michelle Brahaney.

Many distant learning classes are taught from the main campus. This is done primarily for classes at individual schools that do not have enough participating students to warrant a teacher. One such example is Japanese, which is taught by one teacher from Dundee and broadcast live to students at a number of other schools. Many other technology programs and supplies are provided by the ISD.

=== Special education ===
As a special school, the main campus of the Monroe County Intermediate School District is most well known for its special education services. The main campus contains three special education buildings: the Educational Center, main Special Education building, and Transition Center. The Educational Center provides services for students with severe impairments ranging from ages 3–26. The main Special Education building houses administrative offices and the Youth Opportunity Program, which provides education opportunities for low-income students who are looking for jobs or attempting to get their GED. The Transition Center is the smallest building on the main campus and serves to provide assistance to students who have difficulties transitioning into adulthood.

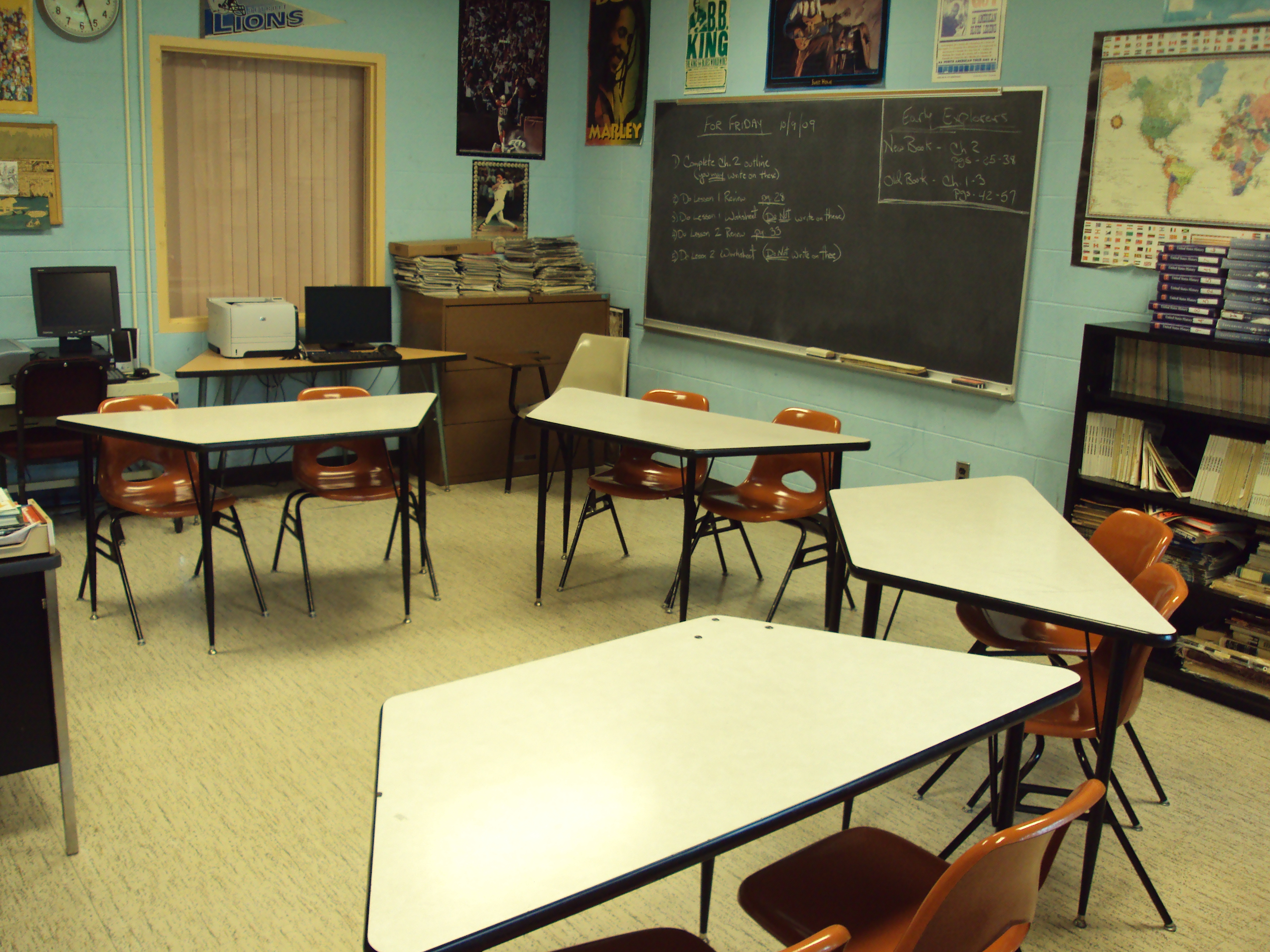
Special education classrooms (shown here at the Youth Center) are much smaller than regular education classes.

While only students with severe impairments attend classes on the main campus, other special education students with less required assistance attend self-contained classrooms in the public school system, where they are able to partake in general education to the best of their abilities. These students are technically enrolled through the ISD but may be placed in any of the nine public school districts, where they may earn their high school diploma from the school they attend. The ISD provides services to these students and also employs the special education teachers and aides. The ISD leases classrooms from other schools to use for special education students. All ISD classrooms are required to have a certified aide who assists the teacher and the classroom, and the number of students in each class is very low compared to other classes. The ISD also oversees classrooms and teachers at the Monroe County Youth Center.

The ISD has its own buses and provides transportation for special education students, especially those who attend a school while living outside of that school district's boundaries. For the most part, an ISD classroom operates independently from the rest of the school in which they are located. The number of ISD classrooms a school has depends on the number of special education students within that school. Most special education students do not leave their ISD classroom during the school day, except for lunch and to attend "out" classes, such as physical education, art, music, etc. They may also go to a resource room for certain subjects in which the student is semi-proficient. These classes are taught by special education teachers but are not run by the ISD.

=== Monroe County Middle College ===
Starting the 2009–10 school year in September 2009, the Monroe County Intermediate School District — in collaboration with Monroe County Community College and the Mercy Memorial Hospital System — formed the Monroe County Middle College (MCMC) for student in grades 9–13. The program, which has selective enrollment, is designed for students who desire early entry into mainly health care professions. Upon graduation from MCMC, student receive their high school diploma and may have earned up to 60 college credits — the equivalent to an associate degree upon graduating from high school. These students are on a College Campus taking their classes.

== Schools served ==
=== Public school districts ===
- Airport Community Schools
- Bedford Public Schools
- Dundee Community Schools
- Ida Public Schools
- Jefferson Schools
- Mason Consolidated Schools
- Monroe Public Schools
- Summerfield Schools
- Whiteford Agricultural Schools

=== Charter schools ===
- New Bedford Academy (Lambertville)
- Triumph Academy (Frenchtown)

=== Private schools ===
- Holy Ghost Lutheran School (Frenchtown)
- Lutheran High School South (Newport)
- Meadow Montessori School (Monroe Township)
- St. Charles School (Newport)
- St. John School (Monroe)
- St. Joseph School (Erie)
- St. Mary Catholic Central (Monroe)
- St. Mary Parish School (Monroe)
- St. Michael School (Monroe)
- St. Patrick School (Carleton)
- State Line Christian School (Temperance)
- Trinity Lutheran School (Monroe)
- Zion Lutheran School (Frenchtown)

=== Juvenile detention schools ===
- Monroe County Youth Center (Monroe Township)
- Moreau Center (Frenchtown)
