= Monroe Charter Township, Michigan =

Monroe Township, Michigan
- Charter township
- Monroe Charter Township
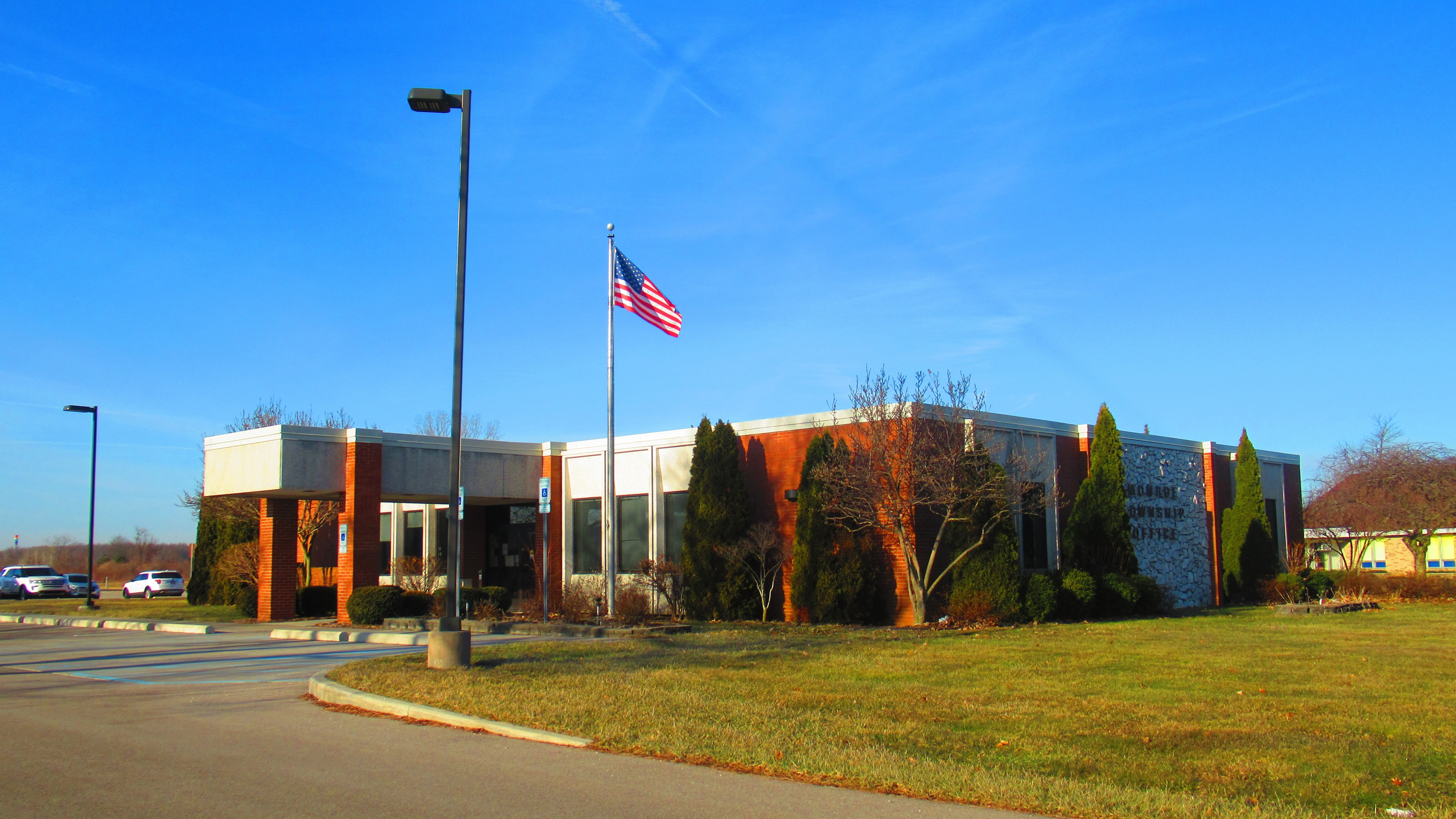
- Township Office along East Dunbar Road

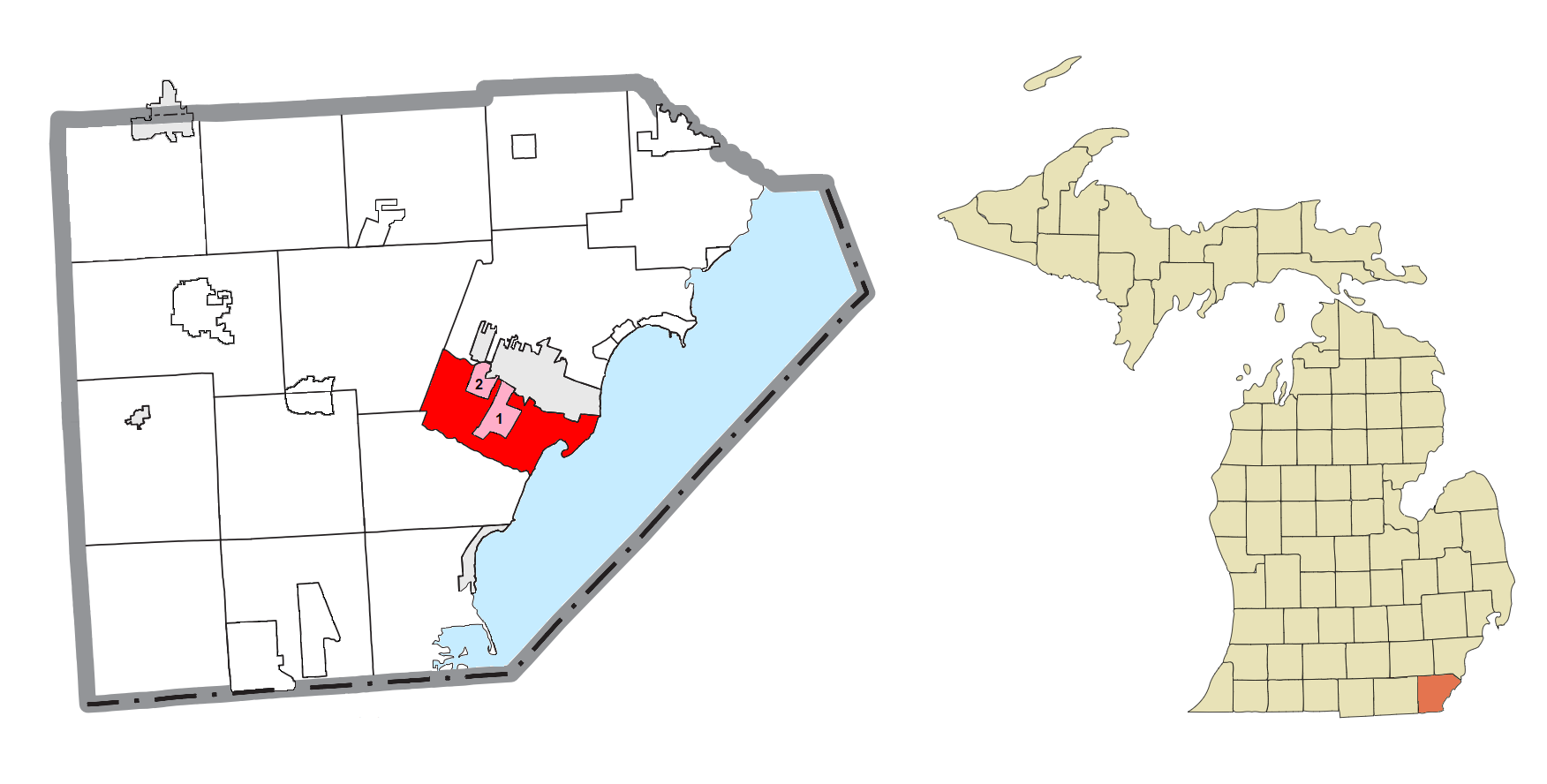
- Location within Monroe County and the administered CDPs of South Monroe (1) and West Monroe (2)

- Location within Michigan Location within the United States
- Coordinates: 41°53′40″N 83°24′50″W
- Country: United States
- State: Michigan
- County: Monroe
- Organized: 1827

Government
  - Supervisor: John Manor
  - Clerk: Christina Smith

Area
  - Total: 18.11 sq mi (46.9 km^{2})
  - Land: 16.88 sq mi (43.7 km^{2})
  - Water: 1.23 sq mi (3.2 km^{2})
- Elevation: 597 ft (182 m)

Population (2020)
  - Total: 14,391
  - Density: 852.7/sq mi (329.2/km^{2})
- Time zone: UTC-5 (Eastern (EST))
  - Summer (DST): UTC-4 (EDT)
- ZIP Codes: 48161 (Monroe); 48145 (La Salle)
- Area code: 734
- FIPS code: 26-115-55040
- GNIS feature ID: 1626755
- Website: monroechartertownship.org

Monroe Charter Township is a charter township of Monroe County in the U.S. state of Michigan. As of the 2020 census, the township population was 14,391.

The township is bordered by the city of Monroe to the north, but the two are administered autonomously. The township was organized in 1827 and named after James Monroe, the fifth president of the United States.

== Communities ==
- Avalon Beach is an unincorporated community located at 41°51′26″N 83°23′34″W.
- Bolles Harbor is an unincorporated community located at 41°52′03″N 83°23′10″W. The community was first platted in 1921 by William Bolles, who began selling lots for year round residents.
- Evergreen Acres is an unincorporated community located at 41°54′26″N 83°25′52″W.
- Greening is a former settlement located within the township. It was settled in 1898 by nurserymen Charles and George Greening about 2.0 miles (3.2 km) southeast of the city of Monroe. A post office in Greening operated very briefly from March 3 to August 6, 1898.
- Patterson Gardens is an unincorporated community located at 41°55′06″N 83°25′50″W.
- South Monroe is an unincorporated community and census-designated place located at 41°54′45″N 83°25′04″W.
- West Monroe is an unincorporated community and census-designated place located at 41°54′50″N 83°25′54″W. Monroe High School is located in West Monroe.

== Geography ==
The township is in eastern Monroe County and is bordered to the northeast by the city of Monroe and to the southeast by the shore of Lake Erie. According to the U.S. Census Bureau, the township has a total area of 18.11 square miles (46.90 km^{2}), of which 16.88 square miles (43.72 km^{2}) are land and 1.23 square miles (3.19 km^{2}), or 6.81%, are water.

=== Major highways ===
- I-75 runs south–north along the eastern end of the township near Lake Erie.
- US 24 (Telegraph Road) runs south–north through the center of the township.
- US 25 is a former U.S. highway from 1926–1973 that is now replaced with M-125.
- M-50 (S. Custer Road) runs west through the township on the south side of the River Raisin.
- M-125 (S. Dixie Highway) runs parallel east of US 24.

== Demographics ==
Historical population
Census	Pop.	Note	%±
1870	1,003		—
1880	1,018		1.5%
1890	890		−12.6%
1900	1,137		27.8%
1910	1,141		0.4%
1920	1,232		8.0%
1930	2,876		133.4%
1940	3,713		29.1%
1950	5,856		57.7%
1960	8,343		42.5%
1970	9,351		12.1%
1980	11,654		24.6%
1990	11,909		2.2%
2000	13,491		13.3%
2010	14,568		8.0%
2020	14,391		−1.2%
U.S. Decennial Census

As of the census of 2010, there were 14,568 people, 5,312 households, and 3,686 families residing in the township. The population density was 777.0 inhabitants per square mile (300.0/km^{2}). There were 5,572 housing units at an average density of 320.9 per square mile (123.9/km^{2}). The racial makeup of the township was 94.93% White, 1.87% African American, 0.19% Native American, 0.82% Asian, 0.01% Pacific Islander, 0.79% from other races, and 1.39% from two or more races. Hispanic or Latino of any race were 1.97% of the population.

There were 5,312 households, out of which 33.5% had children under the age of 18 living with them, 52.4% were married couples living together, 12.3% had a female householder with no husband present, and 30.6% were non-families. 26.7% of all households were made up of individuals, and 10.9% had someone living alone who was 65 years of age or older. The average household size was 2.50 and the average family size was 3.02.

In the township the population was spread out, with 26.2% under the age of 18, 8.5% from 18 to 24, 29.5% from 25 to 44, 22.3% from 45 to 64, and 13.4% who were 65 years of age or older. The median age was 36 years. For every 100 females, there were 93.1 males. For every 100 females age 18 and over, there were 89.7 males.

The median income for a household in the township was $45,694, and the median income for a family was $52,517. Males had a median income of $44,949 versus $26,674 for females. The per capita income for the township was $23,276. About 8.2% of families and 10.7% of the population were below the poverty line, including 14.1% of those under age 18 and 8.8% of those age 65 or over.

== Education ==
Monroe Township is served by two separate public school districts. The majority of the township is served by Monroe Public Schools, in which Monroe High School is located within the township. A small western portion of the township is served by Ida Public Schools, which is centralized in Ida Township.

Monroe County Community College is located within the township.
