= Monroe County, Michigan =

County in Michigan, United States

- County
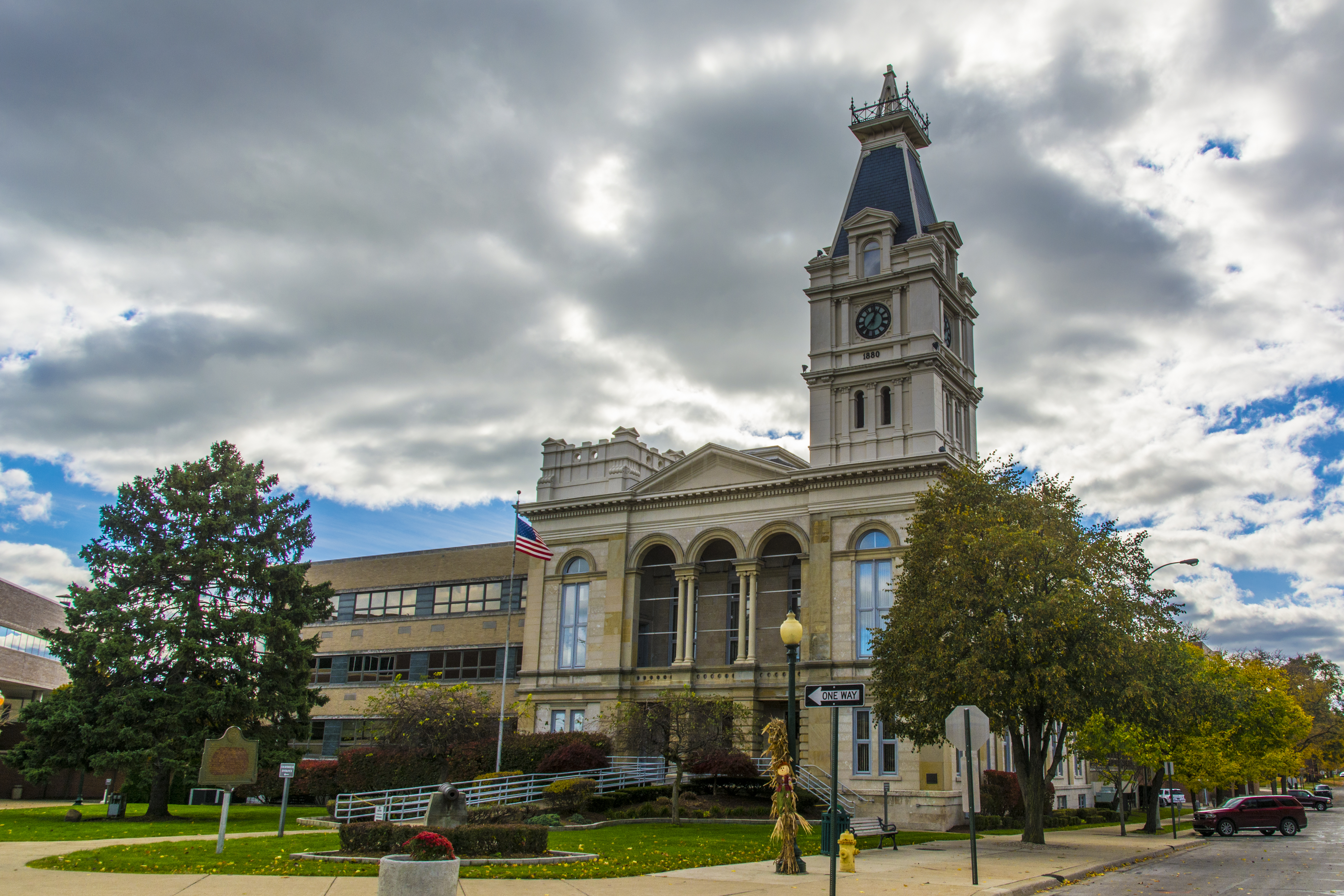
- Monroe County Courthouse

- Flag Seal

- Location within the U.S. state of Michigan
- Coordinates: 41°55′N 83°30′W
- Country: United States
- State: Michigan
- Founded: July 14, 1817
- Named for: James Monroe
- Seat: Monroe
- Largest city: Monroe

Area
  - Total: 680 sq mi (1,800 km^{2})
  - Land: 549 sq mi (1,420 km^{2})
  - Water: 131 sq mi (340 km^{2}) 19%

Population (2020)
  - Total: 154,809
  - Estimate (2025): 156,004 ▲
  - Density: 282/sq mi (109/km^{2})
- Time zone: UTC−5 (Eastern)
  - Summer (DST): UTC−4 (EDT)
- Congressional districts: 5th, 6th
- Website: www.co.monroe.mi.us

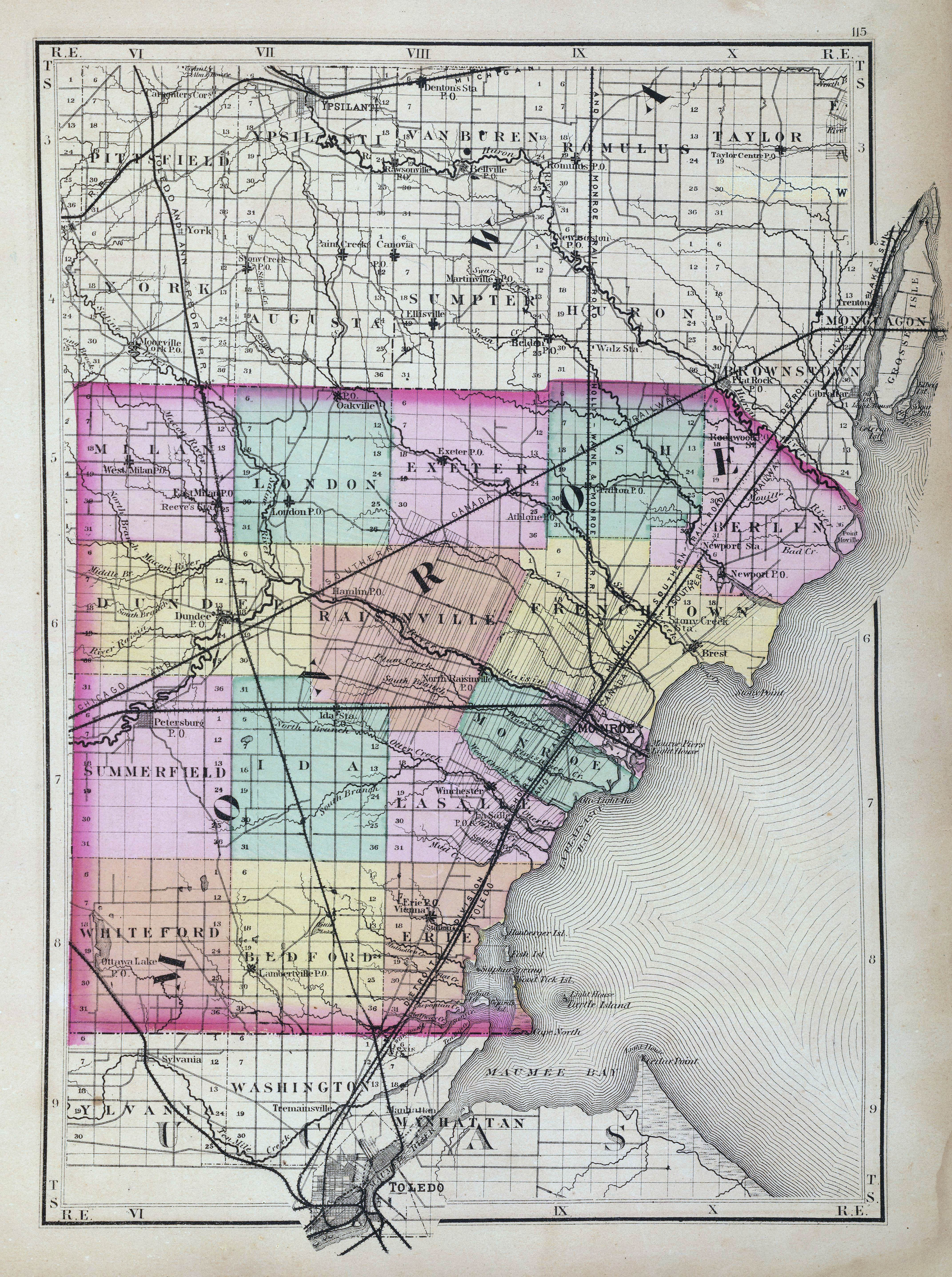
Map of Monroe County from 1873

Monroe County is a county in the U.S. state of Michigan. As of the 2020 Census, the population was 154,809. The largest city and county seat is Monroe. The county was established as the second county (after Wayne County) in the Michigan Territory in 1817 and was named for then-President James Monroe. Monroe County is coterminous with the Monroe metropolitan statistical area.

== History ==
Before the county's formation, the primary settlement was Frenchtown, which was settled in as early as 1784 along the banks of the River Raisin. The small plot of land was given to the early French settlers by the Potawatomi Native Americans, and the area was claimed for New France. The settlement of Frenchtown, Michigan and the slight northerly settlement of Sandy Creek drew in a total of about 100 inhabitants. During the War of 1812, the area was the site of the Battle of Frenchtown, which was the worst American defeat in the war and remains the deadliest conflict ever on Michigan soil. The site of the battle is now part of the River Raisin National Battlefield Park.

Monroe County was formed from the southern portion of Wayne County in 1817. At the time, the Michigan Territory, which had not yet received statehood, consisted of only Wayne County since Detroit was the only area which had a non-indigenous population over 1,000 people. When the area became more populated, the southern portion of Wayne County was broken off to form Monroe County; the settlement of Frenchtown was platted with the name "Monroe".

The settlement also incorporated as a village in 1817 and became the county seat of Monroe County. The county and its county seat were named in honor of then-President James Monroe in anticipation of his upcoming visit to the city. Shortly after its formation, Monroe County's population was recorded at only 336 in the 1820 census. When the county was originally formed, it stretched for 60 miles (97 km) inland (twice its current size), but the western half was split off to form Lenawee County in 1826.

Monroe County's most famous resident, George Armstrong Custer (1839–1876), moved to Monroe as a child and lived with his half-sister and brother-in-law. Although not born in Monroe, he attended school in Monroe and later moved away to attend the United States Military Academy. He returned to Monroe in 1864 during the Civil War to marry Elizabeth Bacon (1842–1933), whom he met while previously living in Monroe. Much of Custer's family resided in Monroe, included Elizabeth Bacon, Henry Armstrong Reed (1858–1876), and Boston Custer (1848–1876). After their deaths in the Battle of the Little Bighorn, Henry and Boston were interred and memorialized in Monroe's historic Woodland Cemetery, as are many members of Bacon's family. Although George Custer died in the same battle, he was interred at West Point Cemetery and Elizabeth Bacon was buried next to him when she died many decades later. In 1910, then-President William Howard Taft and the widowed Elizabeth Bacon unveiled an equestrian statue of Custer which now sits at the corner of Elm Street and Monroe Street in the heart of downtown Monroe.

=== Border disputes ===
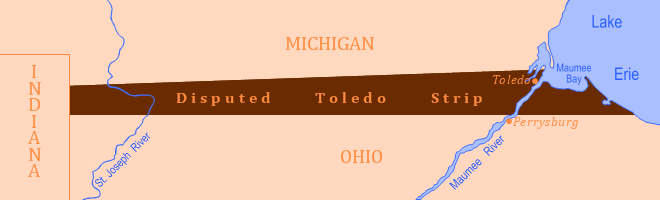
The portion of the Michigan Territory claimed by the State of Ohio known as the Toledo Strip

When the city of Toledo was incorporated in 1833, it was part of Monroe County instead of the state of Ohio. The small strip of land surrounding the mouth of the Maumee River was under the jurisdiction of the Michigan Territory, because the borders originally drawn up for the Northwest Ordinance of 1787 set a territorial boundary as the southernmost edge of Lake Michigan. When Ohio became the first in the Northwest Territory to gain statehood in 1803, the state's northern border claimed this important area, even though the boundaries of the Michigan Territory when it was formally organized in 1805 also included this area. From 1833 to 1836, Toledo belonged to Monroe County, which led to the very heated Toledo War border dispute between the Michigan Territory and the state of Ohio for the area known as the Toledo Strip. In late 1836, President Andrew Jackson, who earlier had appointed his brilliant young aide Stevens T. Mason as the Michigan Territory's "boy governor", intervened to settle the dispute. The federal government gave the Toledo Strip to Ohio in exchange for Michigan getting the Upper Peninsula, then considered a wasteland, when it became a state on January 26, 1837. While Toledo was part of Monroe County, it surpassed Monroe in terms of size and population. In 1915, Michigan Governor Woodbridge N. Ferris and Ohio Governor Frank B. Willis called a ceremonial truce to the border conflict when new state line markers were erected.

The new state line at the end of the Toledo War was established at approximately the 41°44' north latitude line just north of the mouth of the Maumee River. This gave the river and the city of Toledo to the state of Ohio, but it also created an unintended consequence for a specific area of Michigan. The state line also cut through the smaller Ottawa River and inadvertently cut off a small section of Monroe County, creating an exclave known as the "Lost Peninsula" (41°44′08.3″N 83°27′35.6″W). The few Michigan residents that live on the small peninsula must travel south into Lucas County, Ohio on a 10-minute drive before going north to get back to the rest of Michigan. The Lost Peninsula is administered by Erie Township and most of the peninsula contains a marina.

Monroe County's boundary remained unchanged from 1837 to 1973, when a final unresolved dispute from the Toledo War was resolved, 136 years after the conflict. Ownership over the very small, uninhabited Turtle Island in a remote portion of Lake Erie was disputed for decades after the island's lighthouse was shut down. The island was long controlled by Michigan but still disputed by Ohio. On February 22, 1973, an agreement was met, and state lines were redrawn for the last time to cut exactly through the tiny island, which divided the island between Monroe County and Lucas County. Erie Township has jurisdiction over the Michigan half of Turtle Island, and the city of Toledo controls the other half. What to do with the island remains a contentious issue since neither side can come to any agreement. Today, the island has several abandoned structures, and the recent building of new structures was halted by a court order.

=== Economic history ===
The Monroe Power Plant, owned by Detroit Edison, has the tallest structures in Monroe County.

Prior to the mid-20th century, Monroe County remained largely agrarian and was well known for its numerous paper mills—the first of which was founded in 1834. In 1916, August Meyer founded Brisk Blast, which was a bicycle pump manufacturer that was later expanded to produce automotive shocks in 1919 as the Monroe Auto Equipment Company. In 1977, the company merged with the international Tenneco company. Today, their world headquarters are located in Monroe Charter Township and continue to manufacture Monroe Shocks and Struts. In 1927, cousins Edward Knabusch and Edwin Shoemaker founded a small furniture making company in their garage. This would later evolve into the worldwide La-Z-Boy Incorporated, and their world headquarters are located on North Telegraph Road in Monroe.

In 1957, the Enrico Fermi Nuclear Generating Station first opened in Frenchtown Charter Township near Lake Erie. Today, the plant is operated by Detroit Edison but is entirely owned by parent company DTE Energy. In 1974, the Monroe Power Plant, currently the fourth largest coal firing plant in North America, opened. At 805 feet (245 m) tall, the dual smokestacks are visible from over 25 miles (40 km) away and are among the tallest structures in the state. A third smokestack—shorter and wider than the other two—was constructed as the plant responds to meet environmental regulations. In 1929, Newton Steel opened a manufacturing plant on Lake Erie in Monroe, and this plant would later be purchased by Alcoa in 1942, Kelsey-Hayes in 1947, the Ford Motor Company in 1949 later under their Visteon division in 2000 and then as the Automotive Components Holdings in 2005. The plant, one of the most prominent manufacturing job in the county, produces various car parts for Ford. The plant itself is also well known for its high level of chemicals that once polluted Lake Erie and the River Raisin. Although threatened to close, the factory remains open with 1,200 employees. Today the Port of Monroe is still heavily industrialized and various other industries have moved to Monroe County in recent years. In 2001, Cabela's built a store in Dundee. As one of the largest stores of its kind, this location is a major tourist destination and has greatly improved the economy of Dundee. The Global Engine Manufacturing Alliance was also founded in Dundee in 2002.

== Geography ==
According to the U.S. Census Bureau, the county has a total area of 680 square miles (1,800 km^{2}), of which 549 square miles (1,420 km^{2}) is land and 131 square miles (340 km^{2}) (19%) is water. Monroe is Michigan's only county on Lake Erie. The River Raisin and Sandy Creek flow through the county. Sterling State Park is the county's only state park and the only of Michigan's 98 state parks located on Lake Erie. The Detroit River International Wildlife Refuge extends south into Monroe County and includes part of the North Maumee Bay Archeological District. Monroe County sits at the lowest elevation in Michigan, which is the shores of Lake Erie at 571 feet (174 meters).

=== Adjacent counties ===
- Wayne County (northeast)
- Washtenaw County (northwest)
- Essex County, Ontario, Canada (east)
- Lenawee County (west)
- Lucas County, Ohio (south)

=== Climate ===
Monroe County lies in the humid continental climate zone. The city of Monroe only receives an average of 28.5 inches (72 cm) of snow a year — the lowest average snowfall for any large city in the state. July is the warmest month with an average high temperature of 84 °F (29 °C), and January is the coldest month with an average low temperature of 16 °F (−9 °C). The county does not normally have extremely hot or cold temperatures. On average, the temperature only drops below 0 °F (−18 °C) a couple of times during a winter season, and it is even rarer for the temperature to rise above 100 °F (38 °C) during the summer. The coldest recorded temperature was −21 °F (−29 °C) on February 5, 1918. The highest recorded temperature was 106 °F (41 °C) on July 24, 1934, with another equal temperature recorded on one occasion many years earlier.

Severe weather events are very rare. Monroe County has experienced a total approximately 30 tornadoes since 1950. Infrequent waterspouts can also be seen out on Lake Erie. Many tornadoes have been a part of major outbreaks, and none have directly affected the heavily populated areas. Three separate F4 tornadoes killed 13 people during the 1965 Palm Sunday tornado outbreak on April 11, 1965. In the Super Outbreak of April 3–4, 1974, two tornadoes (one F2 and one F3) caused five deaths. The most tornadoes from a single storm came on August 29, 1979, when four tornadoes touched down in and near Monroe. However, the tornadoes were weak (three F1 and one F0), and there were no deaths. The most recent tornado to touchdown and cause significant damage in the county struck Dundee Township in a minor outbreak that caused several tornadoes around the southern portion of Michigan on the morning of June 6, 2010.

Since Monroe is too far north and inland, no hurricanes have struck Monroe County directly. However, some of the strongest hurricanes have affected the county with a few irregular inches of increased rainfall, although they have had no more power in the area than a depression does. Tropical Storm Candy (1968) traveled unusually far inland and dropped 2.5 inches (6.4 cm) of rain. Other storms, such as Hurricane Hugo (1989) and Hurricane Isabel (2003) also dropped trace amounts of rain with over 30 miles per hour (48 km/h) winds—long after they lost their hurricane status.

== Demographics ==
Historical population
Census	Pop.	Note	%±
1830	3,187		—
1840	9,922		211.3%
1850	14,698		48.1%
1860	21,593		46.9%
1870	27,483		27.3%
1880	33,624		22.3%
1890	32,337		−3.8%
1900	32,754		1.3%
1910	32,917		0.5%
1920	37,115		12.8%
1930	52,485		41.4%
1940	58,620		11.7%
1950	75,666		29.1%
1960	101,120		33.6%
1970	118,479		17.2%
1980	134,659		13.7%
1990	133,600		−0.8%
2000	145,945		9.2%
2010	152,021		4.2%
2020	154,809		1.8%
2025 (est.)	156,004	▲	0.8%
U.S. Decennial Census; 1790–1960 1900–1990; 1990–2000 2010–2019

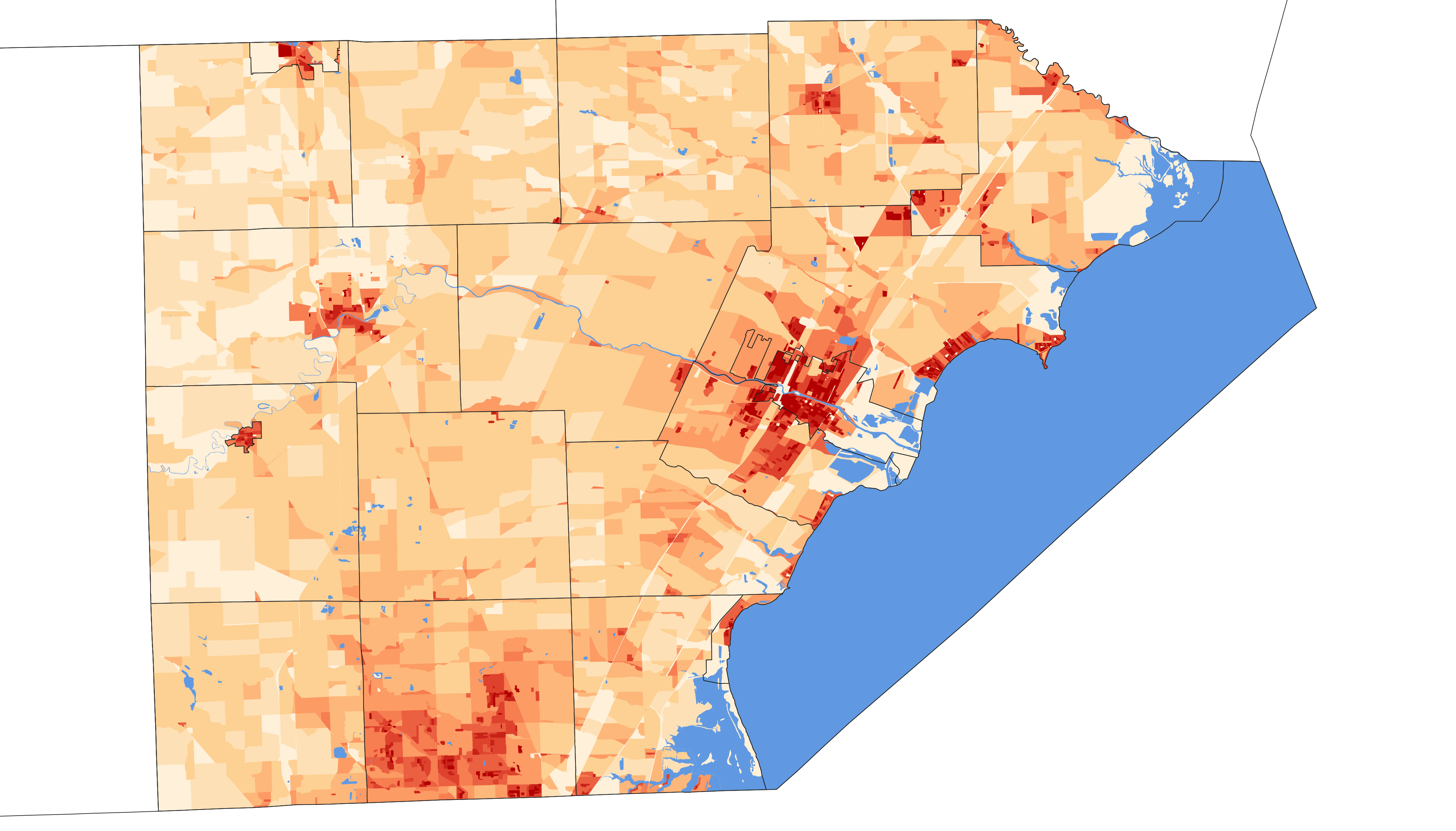
2020 population density of Monroe County MI by census block

=== Racial and ethnic composition ===
Monroe County, Michigan – Racial and ethnic composition Note: the US Census treats Hispanic/Latino as an ethnic category. This table excludes Latinos from the racial categories and assigns them to a separate category. Hispanics/Latinos may be of any race.
Race / Ethnicity (NH = Non-Hispanic)	Pop 1980	Pop 1990	Pop 2000	Pop 2010	Pop 2020	% 1980	% 1990	% 2000	% 2010	% 2020
White alone (NH)	129,902	128,188	137,391	140,609	135,369	96.47%	95.95%	94.14%	92.49%	87.44%
Black or African American alone (NH)	2,297	2,308	2,686	3,144	4,036	1.71%	1.73%	1.84%	2.07%	2.61%
Native American or Alaska Native alone (NH)	255	430	351	397	414	0.19%	0.32%	0.24%	0.26%	0.27%
Asian alone (NH)	280	570	674	837	952	0.21%	0.43%	0.46%	0.55%	0.61%
Native Hawaiian or Pacific Islander alone (NH)	x	x	11	24	24	x	x	0.01%	0.02%	0.02%
Other race alone (NH)	122	27	102	78	490	0.09%	0.02%	0.07%	0.05%	0.32%
Mixed race or Multiracial (NH)	x	x	1,620	2,265	7,293	x	x	1.11%	1.49%	4.71%
Hispanic or Latino (any race)	1,803	2,077	3,110	4,667	6,231	1.34%	1.55%	2.13%	3.07%	4.02%
Total	134,659	133,600	145,945	152,021	154,809	100.00%	100.00%	100.00%	100.00%	100.00%

=== 2020 census ===
As of the 2020 census, the county had a population of 154,809. The median age was 42.5 years. 21.2% of residents were under the age of 18 and 18.6% of residents were 65 years of age or older. For every 100 females there were 99.5 males, and for every 100 females age 18 and over there were 98.4 males age 18 and over.

The racial makeup of the county was 88.9% White, 2.7% Black or African American, 0.4% American Indian and Alaska Native, 0.6% Asian, <0.1% Native Hawaiian and Pacific Islander, 1.2% from some other race, and 6.2% from two or more races. Hispanic or Latino residents of any race comprised 4.0% of the population.

62.3% of residents lived in urban areas, while 37.7% lived in rural areas.

There were 62,152 households in the county, of which 27.9% had children under the age of 18 living in them. Of all households, 50.7% were married-couple households, 18.4% were households with a male householder and no spouse or partner present, and 23.4% were households with a female householder and no spouse or partner present. About 26.8% of all households were made up of individuals and 11.9% had someone living alone who was 65 years of age or older.

There were 65,845 housing units, of which 5.6% were vacant. Among occupied housing units, 77.9% were owner-occupied and 22.1% were renter-occupied. The homeowner vacancy rate was 1.2% and the rental vacancy rate was 6.8%.

=== 2000 census ===
As of the 2000 census, there were 145,945 people, 53,772 households, and 39,952 families residing in the county. The population density was 265 inhabitants per square mile (102/km^{2}). There were 56,471 housing units at an average density of 102 per square mile (39/km^{2}). The racial makeup of the county was 95.42% White, 1.90% Black or African American, 0.28% Native American, 0.47% Asian, 0.01% Pacific Islander, 0.62% from other races, and 1.31% from two or more races. 2.13% of the population was Hispanic or Latino of any race. 28.5% were of German, 8.9% American, 8.3% Polish, 8.2% French, 8.0% Irish, 7.5% English and 5.7% Italian ancestry, 96.4% spoke only English at home, while 1.5% spoke Spanish.

There were 53,772 households, out of which 36.00% had children under the age of 18 living with them, 60.00% were married couples living together, 10.10% had a female household with no husband present, and 25.70% were non-families. 21.70% of all households were made up of individuals, and 8.50% had someone living alone who was 65 years of age or older. The average household size was 2.69 and the average family size was 3.14.

In the county, 27.40% of the population was under the age of 18, 8.10% was from 18 to 24, 29.80% from 25 to 44, 23.50% from 45 to 64, and 11.10% was 65 years of age or older. The median age was 36 years. For every 100 females, there were 98.40 males. For every 100 females age 18 and over, there were 95.20 males. The median income for a household in the county was $51,743, and the median income for a family was $59,659. Males had a median income of $46,715 versus $27,421 for females. The per capita income for the county was $22,458. About 4.80% of families and 7.00% of the population were below the poverty line, including 8.10% of those under age 18 and 8.30% of those age 65 or over.

== Education ==
Monroe County contains nine public school districts. There are approximately 23,000 students in public schools in the county. Public school district boundaries are not conterminous with the county boundary or any municipality boundaries within the county. The county is a "district of choice" county, and students have the option to attend any district in the county, even if they do not live within a particular district. Students near the county line, especially those in northern locations such as Milan, Flat Rock, Milan Township, and London Township, are assigned to districts in the neighboring counties of Wayne and Washtenaw. Located primarily in Monroe County, Airport Community Schools and Whiteford Agricultural Schools have boundaries that extend into neighboring counties thus a small number of out-of-county students attend schools in Monroe County.

There are two charter schools in the county with a total of 750 students. There are also 15 parochial schools with approximately 2,200 students enrolled in the private sector. The county is also served by one independent school district, the Monroe County Intermediate School District, which provides education services and staff support at all of the county's schools. Established in 1964 and first opened to students in 1967, Monroe County Community College is the only higher education institution in the county. Marygrove College, sponsored by the local Sisters, Servants of the Immaculate Heart of Mary (IHM), was founded in Monroe in 1905 as a Catholic, liberal arts college. The college moved to its current location in Detroit in 1927. The IHM also operated a boarding school, the Hall of the Divine Child, in Monroe from 1918 to 1980. Students in the county may be homeschooled.

=== K-12 education ===
Monroe County is served by 14 public school districts, with nine of them based in the county. The largest of these is Monroe Public Schools, which enrolls approximately 6,450 students in the city of Monroe and outlying area of the city limits. With around 2,100 students, Monroe High School is one of the largest high schools in the state. The Monroe County Intermediate School District is an independent school district that provides services to both public and private schools in the county. Students in Monroe County can choose to enroll in any public school district in the county, granted the district has available space. If a student attends a school outside of their normal district, the school will usually not provide transportation for the student. The district boundary map is provided by the Michigan Department of Information Technology. All district's athletic teams are governed by the Michigan High School Athletic Association. A small number of schools have been closed down or reused for different purposes, and some of the smaller districts consists of a single elementary school and a combined middle and high school.

=== Districts ===
School districts include:

- Airport Community School District
- Bedford Public Schools
- Blissfield Community Schools
- Britton Deerfield School District
- Flat Rock Community Schools
- Dundee Community Schools
- Huron School District
- Ida Public School District
- Jefferson Schools
- Mason Consolidated Schools
- Milan Area Schools
- Monroe Public Schools
- Summerfield School District
- Whiteford Agricultural School District

=== Schools ===
Public schools in Monroe County

Secondary school
Primary school
Alternative school
Specialized learning centers

District	School	Location	
Airport Community Schools	Airport Senior High School	Ash Township	42°02′24″N 83°22′35″W
Airport Community Schools	Edith M. Wagar Middle School	Ash Township	42°02′18″N 83°22′44″W
Airport Community Schools	Fred W. Ritter Elementary School	South Rockwood	42°03′43″N 83°16′21″W
Airport Community Schools	Joseph C. Sterling Elementary School	Ash Township	42°02′31″N 83°22′39″W
Airport Community Schools	Loren Eyler Elementary School	Ash Township	42°03′56″N 83°21′10″W
Airport Community Schools	Niedermeier Elementary School	Berlin Township	41°59′57″N 83°18′36″W
Bedford Public Schools	Bedford Junior High School	Temperance	41°46′07″N 83°35′19″W
Bedford Public Schools	Bedford Senior High School	Temperance	41°45′58″N 83°35′20″W
Bedford Public Schools	Douglas Road Elementary School	Lambertville	41°44′26″N 83°36′26″W
Bedford Public Schools	Jackman Road Elementary School	Temperance	41°45′41″N 83°35′10″W
Bedford Public Schools	Monroe Road Elementary School	Lambertville	41°45′26″N 83°38′17″W
Bedford Public Schools	Open Door Alternative High School	Temperance	41°44′58″N 83°35′01″W
Bedford Public Schools	Smith Road Elementary School	Temperance	41°44′06″N 83°34′14″W
Bedford Public Schools	Temperance Road Elementary School	Temperance	41°46′41″N 83°34′59″W
Dundee Community Schools	Dundee Alternative High School	Dundee	41°57′13″N 83°39′33″W
Dundee Community Schools	Dundee Elementary School	Dundee	41°57′37″N 83°39′28″W
Dundee Community Schools	Dundee High School	Dundee	41°57′45″N 83°39′44″W
Dundee Community Schools	Dundee Middle School	Dundee	41°57′40″N 83°39′32″W
Ida Public Schools	Ida Elementary School	Ida Township	41°54′27″N 83°34′04″W
Ida Public Schools	Ida High School	Ida Township	41°54′23″N 83°34′11″W
Ida Public Schools	Ida Middle School	Ida Township	41°54′22″N 83°34′17″W
Jefferson Schools	Harold F. Sodt Elementary School	Frenchtown Township	41°56′45″N 83°19′14″W
Jefferson Schools	Jefferson 5/6 Elementary School	Frenchtown Township	41°57′12″N 83°18′46″W
Jefferson Schools	Jefferson Early Childhood Center	Frenchtown Township	41°56′17″N 83°20′56″W
Jefferson Schools	Jefferson High School	Frenchtown Township	41°57′24″N 83°18′42″W
Jefferson Schools	Jefferson Middle School	Frenchtown Township	41°57′15″N 83°18′45″W
Jefferson Schools	North Elementary School	Berlin Township	41°59′55″N 83°16′43″W
Mason Consolidated Schools	Mason Central Elementary School	Erie Township	41°48′38″N 83°29′27″W
Mason Consolidated Schools	Mason Middle School	Erie Township	41°48′38″N 83°29′36″W
Mason Consolidated Schools	Mason Senior High School	Erie Township	41°48′48″N 83°29′29″W
Monroe Public Schools	Custer #1 Elementary School	South Monroe	41°53′01″N 83°25′57″W
Monroe Public Schools	Custer #2 Elementary School	South Monroe	41°52′58″N 83°26′04″W
Monroe Public Schools	Cantrick Elementary School	Monroe	41°55′37″N 83°22′56″W
Monroe Public Schools	Hollywood Elementary School	Monroe	41°55′45″N 83°22′58″W
Monroe Public Schools	Knabusch Mathematics & Science Center	Monroe Township	41°52′30″N 83°23′27″W
Monroe Public Schools	Manor Elementary School	Monroe	41°55′56″N 83°25′05″W
Monroe Public Schools	Monroe High School	West Monroe	41°55′07″N 83°26′17″W
Monroe Public Schools	Monroe Middle School	Monroe	41°54′39″N 83°23′58″W
Monroe Public Schools	Orchard Center High School	Monroe	41°54′05″N 83°22′42″W
Monroe Public Schools	Raisinville Elementary School	Raisinville Township	41°58′14″N 83°26′47″W
Monroe Public Schools	Riverside Early Childhood Center	Monroe	41°55′21″N 83°24′31″W
Monroe Public Schools	Waterloo Elementary School	West Monroe	41°55′12″N 83°25′33″W
Summerfield Schools	Summerfield Elementary School	Petersburg	41°53′59″N 83°42′32″W
Summerfield Schools	Summerfield High School	Petersburg	41°54′18″N 83°42′07″W
Summerfield Schools	Summerfield Middle School	Petersburg	41°54′20″N 83°42′09″W
Whiteford Agricultural Schools	Whiteford Elementary School	Whiteford Township	41°45′58″N 83°42′15″W
Whiteford Agricultural Schools	Whiteford High School	Whiteford Township	41°46′05″N 83°42′08″W
Whiteford Agricultural Schools	Whiteford Middle School	Whiteford Township	41°46′04″N 83°42′14″W

Private schools in Monroe County

Public charter school
Parochial school
Independent school

School	Location		Grades	Enrollment
Holy Ghost Lutheran School	Raisinville Township	41°59′32″N 83°25′44″W	Pre–8	100
Meadow Montessori School	Raisinville Township	41°54′50″N 83°28′39″W	Infant–12	180
Monroe Catholic Elementary Schools: St. Michael Early Elementary School, St. John Elementary School, St. Mary Middle School	Monroe	N/A	Infant–8	531
New Bedford Academy	Lambertville	41°43′48″N 83°37′37″W	K–8	150
St. Charles School	Berlin Township	41°59′43″N 83°17′18″W	Pre–8	177
St. Joseph School	Erie Township	41°54′42″N 83°24′05″W	Pre–8	110
St. Mary Catholic Central High School	Monroe	41°55′10″N 83°23′53″W	9–12	425
St. Patrick Catholic School	Ash Township	42°01′32″N 83°25′06″W	K–8	134
State Line Christian School	Temperance	41°44′03″N 83°33′59″W	Pre–12	275
Trinity Lutheran School	Monroe	41°54′42″N 83°23′46″W	Pre–8	205
Triumph Academy	Frenchtown Township	41°57′13″N 83°21′43″W	K–8	600
Zion Lutheran School	Frenchtown Township	41°56′12″N 83°23′00″W	Pre–8	94

Other schools in Monroe County

School	Location		Classification
Monroe County Community College	Monroe Township	41°55′01″N 83°28′08″W	Community college
Monroe County Intermediate School District	Monroe Township	41°55′26″N 83°28′01″W	Intermediate school district
Monroe County Middle College	Monroe Township	41°55′01″N 83°28′08″W	Alternative high school
Monroe County Youth Center	Monroe Township	41°55′55″N 83°27′32″W	Youth detention center
Moreau Center	Frenchtown Township	41°57′45″N 83°22′01″W	Youth detention center

== Politics ==
United States presidential election results for Monroe County, Michigan
Year	Republican		Democratic		Third party(ies)	
Year	No.	%	No.	%	No.	%
1884	3,025	41.88%	3,920	54.27%	278	3.85%
1888	3,430	45.33%	3,940	52.07%	197	2.60%
1892	2,914	41.50%	3,769	53.68%	338	4.81%
1896	4,053	48.13%	4,208	49.97%	160	1.90%
1900	3,876	48.88%	3,859	48.67%	194	2.45%
1904	4,407	56.95%	3,127	40.41%	205	2.65%
1908	4,206	53.07%	3,451	43.54%	269	3.39%
1912	2,253	30.88%	2,995	41.04%	2,049	28.08%
1916	3,787	46.64%	4,202	51.76%	130	1.60%
1920	8,646	61.34%	5,224	37.06%	226	1.60%
1924	8,940	58.12%	4,981	32.38%	1,462	9.50%
1928	10,202	58.27%	7,242	41.37%	63	0.36%
1932	7,255	36.26%	12,417	62.05%	338	1.69%
1936	8,330	39.14%	11,075	52.03%	1,879	8.83%
1940	13,517	56.45%	10,368	43.30%	60	0.25%
1944	13,478	56.54%	10,275	43.11%	83	0.35%
1948	11,070	50.72%	10,434	47.81%	320	1.47%
1952	17,159	57.06%	12,758	42.42%	157	0.52%
1956	18,782	56.39%	14,414	43.28%	109	0.33%
1960	18,607	48.43%	19,684	51.23%	132	0.34%
1964	11,499	30.17%	26,528	69.61%	84	0.22%
1968	15,685	39.64%	18,921	47.81%	4,966	12.55%
1972	23,263	54.76%	17,726	41.73%	1,490	3.51%
1976	20,676	46.36%	23,290	52.22%	631	1.41%
1980	25,612	51.26%	20,578	41.19%	3,774	7.55%
1984	29,419	59.69%	19,617	39.80%	251	0.51%
1988	26,189	54.19%	21,847	45.21%	288	0.60%
1992	20,250	34.30%	24,957	42.28%	13,824	23.42%
1996	19,678	37.46%	26,072	49.63%	6,779	12.91%
2000	28,940	46.83%	31,555	51.06%	1,300	2.10%
2004	37,470	50.54%	36,089	48.68%	573	0.77%
2008	35,858	46.79%	39,180	51.13%	1,593	2.08%
2012	35,593	48.69%	36,310	49.68%	1,192	1.63%
2016	43,261	57.95%	26,863	35.98%	4,531	6.07%
2020	52,710	60.39%	32,975	37.78%	1,597	1.83%
2024	57,405	62.84%	32,622	35.71%	1,329	1.45%

United States Senate election results for Monroe County, Michigan1
Year	Republican		Democratic		Third party(ies)	
Year	No.	%	No.	%	No.	%
2024	54,082	60.79%	32,420	36.44%	2,460	2.77%

Michigan Gubernatorial election results for Monroe County
Year	Republican		Democratic		Third party(ies)	
Year	No.	%	No.	%	No.	%
2022	38,312	55.53%	29,482	42.73%	1,203	1.74%

Monroe County was a swing county in presidential elections. It has voted for the winning candidate for president in 16 of the last 19 presidential elections, the only exceptions being in 1968, 2000, and 2020. In 2016, Donald Trump received 58% of the vote, the largest percentage since Ronald Reagan in 1984. In 2020, Trump outdid his 2016 total by winning 60.4% of the vote. In 2024, he yet again improved in the county, taking 62.8% of the vote, likely indicating that Monroe County is now a consistently Republican-leaning county.

The county prohibits construction of solar power plants.

== Landmarks and attractions ==
- Custer Airport
- Detroit River International Wildlife Refuge
- Detroit River Light
- Dundee Historic District
- Eby Log Cabin
- East Elm-North Macomb Street Historic District
- Edward Loranger House
- Enrico Fermi Nuclear Generating Station
- George Armstrong Custer Equestrian Monument
- Governor Robert McClelland House
- Hall of the Divine Child, now the Norman Towers residence hall
- Jefferson Avenue-Huron River Bridge
- La-Z-Boy world headquarters
- Martha Barker Country Store Museum
- Monroe County Fair (Stock Arena)
- Monroe County Historical Museum
- Monroe County Labor History Museum
- Monroe County Vietnam Veterans Historical Museum
- Monroe Multi-Sports Complex
- Monroe Power Plant
- Navarre-Anderson Trading Post
- North Maumee Bay Archeological District
- Old Mill Museum
- Old Village Historic District
- Pointe Mouillee State Game Area
- River Raisin Battlefield Visitor Center
- River Raisin National Battlefield Park
- River Raisin Centre for the Arts
- Rudolph Nims House
- St. Mary's Church Complex Historic District
- St. Michael the Archangel Church
- Sawyer House
- Sisters, Servants of the Immaculate Heart of Mary
- Southern Michigan Timberwolves are based in Monroe.
- Sterling State Park
- The Mall of Monroe (formerly known as Frenchtown Square Mall)
- Weis Manufacturing Company
- Woodland Cemetery

== Transportation ==

Portions of Monroe County are served by the Lake Erie Transit public transportation bus system. Established in 1975, Lake Erie Transit currently has a fleet of 31 buses and serves approximately 400,000 riders every year. In 2008, the system logged 764,000 miles. The system operates buses on eight fixed routes in and around the city of Monroe. It also serves several neighboring townships outside of its normal routes should a passenger call ahead for a ride. From Bedford Township, its provides transportation to and from two shopping malls in Toledo, Ohio.

- I-75 travels through the eastern portion of the county and provides access to Toledo to the south and Detroit to the north. I-75 provides an uninterrupted route as far south as South Florida and as far north as the Sault Ste. Marie International Bridge.
- I-275 has its southern terminus just north of Monroe in the northeast portion of the county. Splitting off from I-75, I-275 is a western bypass around Detroit but does not actually merge back with I-75. I-275 serves as a main route to the Metro Airport.
- US 23 runs along the western portion of the county, passing right through Dundee and proceeding north through Ann Arbor. US 23 is a limited-access freeway with interchanges rather than intersections.
- US 24 travels through Monroe and provides access to Toledo and western portions of Detroit. The road is known locally as North Telegraph and South Telegraph—divided at the River Raisin. US 24 also connects to I-275 just north of Monroe.
- US 25 was the designated name for the portion of Dixie Highway north of Cincinnati, including the portion running through Monroe. Like Dixie Highway, US 25 was largely replaced, and the existing highway was truncated at Cincinnati.
- US 223 only runs a short distance through the southwestern corner of the county, where it connects Toledo to US 127 in Michigan. In Monroe County, it is known as St. Anthony Road, and the US 223 designation continues on a 90° bend south with US 23.
- M-50 has its eastern terminus is in Monroe at US 24 and provides a direct route from Monroe to Dundee and further into the state. In Monroe, M-50 is known locally as South Custer Road. In Dundee, it is referred to as East Monroe Street and, after the River Raisin, Tecumseh Road.
- M-125 travels directly through downtown Monroe before merging into US 24 north of Monroe. South of downtown after Jones Avenue, it is called South Dixie Highway. In the downtown area, it is South Monroe Street. North of the River Raisin, it is North Monroe Street.
- M-130 was a state highway existing from 1930 to 1955 and ran along the north banks of the River Raisin. M-130 had its eastern terminus at US 24 and ran for just over nine miles (14 km). In 1955, control of the highway was transferred back to the county and is now called North Custer Road.
- M-151 was a state highway existing from 1935 to 1977. It ran through the southern portion of the county, connecting US 23 to the now-decommissioned US 25. Today, the road is called Samaria Road, with the eastern portion called Lakeside Road.
- Dixie Highway ran through Monroe County in as early as 1915. Originally one of the few ways to reach places like Florida, the highway was largely replaced by I-75 beginning in the 1960s. Today, the namesake of the highway is used for two non-connecting highways (one being M-125), although the same route and remnants of the original highway are long gone.
- Custer Airport was built in 1946 and is located just west of downtown Monroe. It is a general aviation airport, with no commercial or passenger service. The airport has one paved runway primarily used by small private aircraft. There is also a small aviation school on the site.
- Toledo Suburban Airport, not to be confused with the much larger Toledo Express Airport, is located in the southwest portion of the county near Lambertville. Like the Custer Airport, this is a general aviation facility with one paved runway and no scheduled flights. It serves as a fueling station, a test center, and a flight instruction center.

== Communities ==
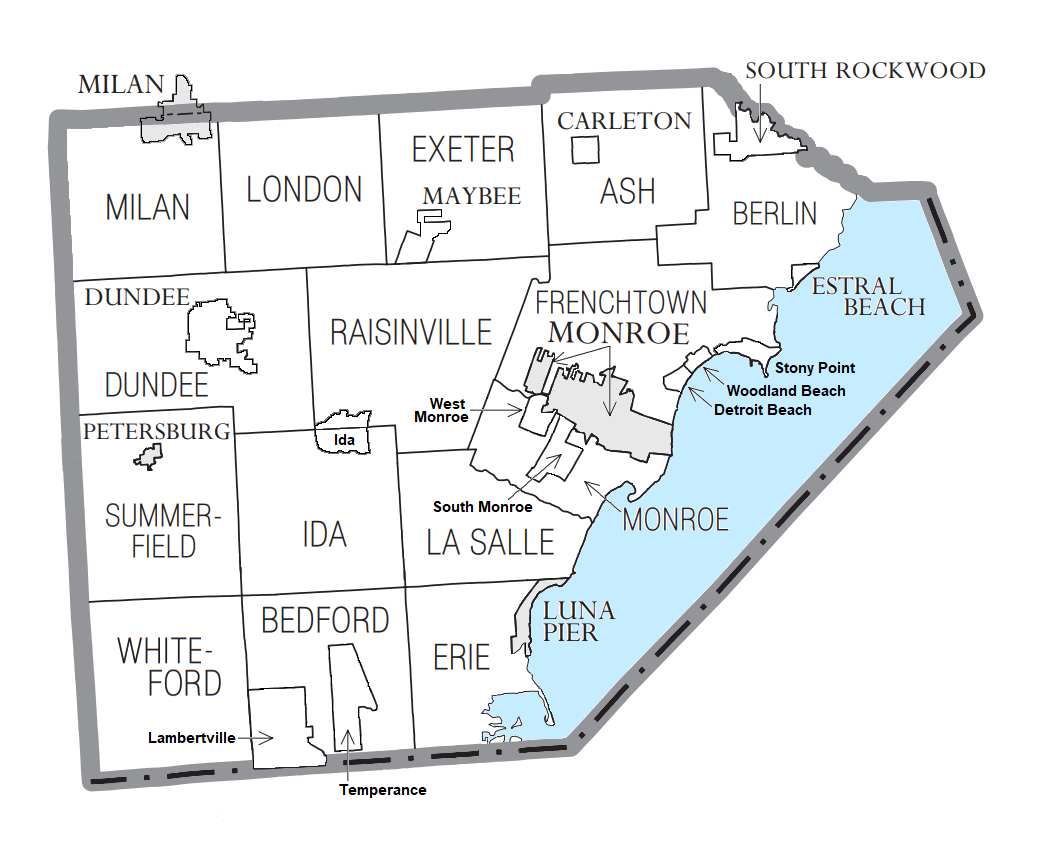
U.S. Census data map showing local municipal boundaries within Monroe County, as well as CDP boundaries. Shaded areas represent incorporated cities

=== Cities ===
- Flat Rock (partial)
- Luna Pier
- Milan (partial)
- Monroe (county seat)
- Petersburg

=== Villages ===
- Carleton
- Dundee
- Estral Beach
- Maybee
- South Rockwood

=== Charter townships ===
- Berlin Charter Township
- Frenchtown Charter Township
- Monroe Charter Township

=== Civil townships ===
- Ash Township
- Bedford Township
- Dundee Township
- Erie Township
- Exeter Township
- Ida Township
- La Salle Township
- London Township
- Milan Township
- Raisinville Township
- Summerfield Township
- Whiteford Township

=== Census-designated places ===
- Detroit Beach
- Ida
- Lambertville
- South Monroe
- Stony Point
- Temperance
- West Monroe
- Woodland Beach

=== Other unincorporated communities ===
- Avalon Beach
- Azalia
- Bolles Harbor
- Cone
- Diann
- Erie
- Evergreen Acres
- Exeter
- Golfcrest
- Grand View
- Grape
- Hillcrest Orchard
- Ida Center
- La Salle
- Liberty Corners
- London
- Lost Peninsula
- Lulu
- Newport
- North Shores
- Oakville
- Oldport
- Ottawa Lake
- Patterson Gardens
- Petersburg Junction
- Pointe aux Peaux
- Rea
- Saint Anthony
- Samaria
- Scofield
- Steiner
- Stony Creek
- Strasburg
- Vienna
- Whiteford Center
- Yargerville

== Notable people ==
- Betty Whiting (1925–1967), All-American Girls Professional Baseball League player
- Boston Custer (1848–1876), younger brother of George Custer, lived in Monroe
- Bronco McKart (b. 1971), former World Boxing Organization champion
- Carl Ford (b. 1980), American football player
- Charles Blue Jacket (1817–1897), Shawnee chief who lived in northern Monroe County
- Christie Brinkley (b. 1954), model who was born in Monroe
- Elisha P. Ferry (1825–1895), first Governor of Washington, was born in Monroe
- Elizabeth Bacon Custer (1842–1933), wife of General Custer, was born in Monroe
- Elizabeth Caroline Crosby (1888–1983), noted neuroanatomist, was born and lived in Petersburg
- Elizabeth McWebb (1904–2004), author of the Little Brown Bear book series
- Elroy M. Avery (1844–1935), politician, author, and historian who was born in Erie Township
- Eric Wilson (b. 1978), Canadian football player for the Montreal Alouettes
- Ernest Ingersoll (1852–1946), environmentalist and naturalist
- George Armstrong Custer (1839–1876), Major General who lived much of his early life in Monroe
- George Spalding (1836–1915), former teacher and politician
- Harry L. Corl (1914–1942), Navy Cross recipient who lived in Lambertville
- Henry Armstrong Reed (1858–1876), nephew of George Custer, lived in Monroe
- Isaac P. Christiancy (1812–1890), former Chief Justice of the Michigan Supreme Court
- J. Sterling Morton (1832–1902), prominent conservationist who lived in Monroe from 1834 to 1854
- Kaye Lani Rae Rafko (b. 1963), native from Monroe who was the 1988 Miss America winner
- Mary Harris Jones (1837–1930), union organizer who moved to Monroe from Ireland
- Megan Moulton-Levy (b. 1985), collegiate tennis player born in Monroe
- Oswald J. Gaynier (1915–1942), Navy Cross recipient who was born in Monroe
- Rico Hoye (b. 1974), professional boxer
- Robert McCelland (1807–1880), prominent Michigan politician
- Vern Sneider (1916–1981), American novelist who lived in Monroe
- Vic Braden (1929–2014), former tennis champion and coach

== See also ==
- List of Michigan State Historic Sites in Monroe County
- National Register of Historic Places listings in Monroe County, Michigan
- Monroe County, Kentucky
