= Federman =

Federman is a surname of German origin, originating as an occupational surname for someone who traded feathers or quill pens. Notable people with the surname include:

- Daniel Federman (1928-2017), American endocrinologist and professor
- Irwin Federman (born 1936), American businessman and philanthropist
- Noam Federman (born 1969), Israeli activist
- Raymond Federman (1928-2009), French-American novelist and academic
- Ross Federman, American drummer, part of the band Tally Hall
- Wayne Federman (born 1959), American comedian, actor, author, writer, comedy historian, producer, and musician

== See also ==
- Federman, Michigan, a former unincorporated community
- Federmann
- Faderman
