= Monroe County Community College =

Community college in Monroe County, Michigan, U.S.

Coordinates: 41°54′58″N 83°28′10″W

- Type: Public community college
- Established: 1964
- President: Kojo Quartey
- Students: 4,624
- Location: Monroe Charter Township and Temperance, Michigan
- Campus: 210 acres (85 ha)
- Mascot: Husky
- Website: www.monroeccc.edu

Monroe County Community College (MCCC) is a public community college in Monroe County, Michigan, United States. The main campus is located in Monroe Charter Township with a smaller off-campus location further south in Temperance.

MCCC was founded in 1964 and is the only higher education institution in the county. The college was established in 1964. Classes were initially held at the Ida Public Schools in the fall of 1965. Classes were first held at the main campus in the fall of 1967.

== Academics ==
MCCC offers a general education program for students seeking transfer to a four-year university or those seeking a career in a vocational education. The college has a nursing school. The highest degree that one can achieve solely through MCCC is an associate degree. Nearby universities, such as Eastern Michigan University and Siena Heights University, offer some of their undergraduate courses at Monroe County Community College so students can earn a bachelor's degree without ever leaving MCCC's campus. MCCC also has a student operated newspaper, and programs available in distance learning, courses on video, and online courses.

In 2026, Time Magazine named MCCC as one of the best community colleges in the country.

== Campus ==
The main campus was built in 1967 just west of Monroe, Michigan in Monroe Charter Township near the River Raisin. There are seven classroom buildings on the campus. The property of the main campus is 274 acres (110.88 ha). The newest buildings are the Health Building (1996) and the La-Z-Boy Center (2006) — the latter of which was so named since the La-Z-Boy company, whose headquarters are located in Monroe, donated money for the construction of the new building. Each of the buildings on the main campus are commonly referred to by a letter abbreviation.

In 1991, MCCC built the Whitman Center about 15 miles (24 km) south in Temperance, Bedford Township to better serve the growing population in the southern portion of the county, as well as providing a closer facility for those in Toledo, Ohio. The Whitman Center offers the same services as the main campus, such as offices and a bookstore, but with limited space and class offerings since the complex consists of only one building with eight classrooms and one computer lab. The complex was named after a nearby Ford dealership, Whitman Ford, which donated money for its construction.
