= West Monroe, Michigan =

- Census-designated place (CDP) & unincorporated community
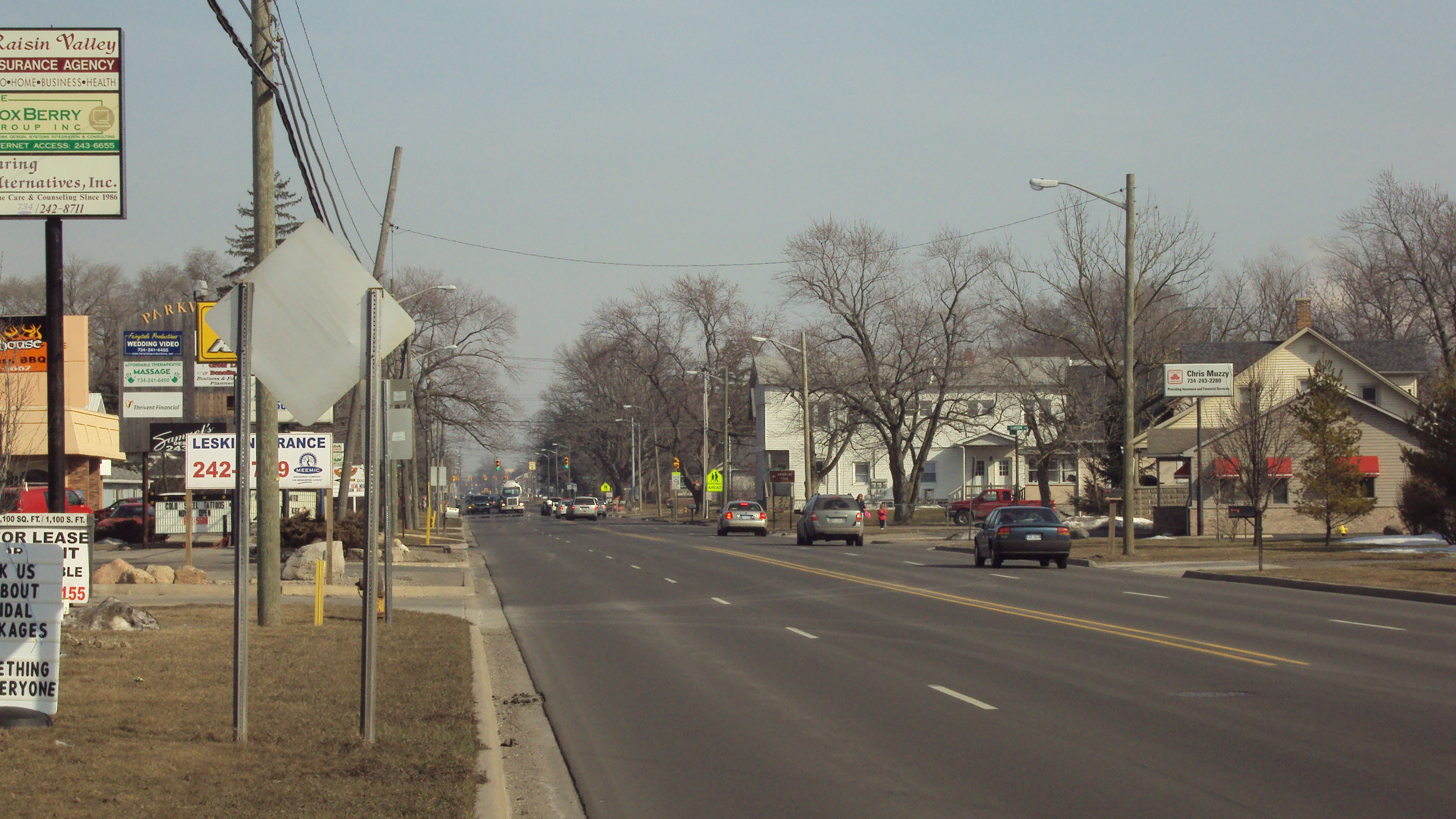
- West Monroe looking east along M-50

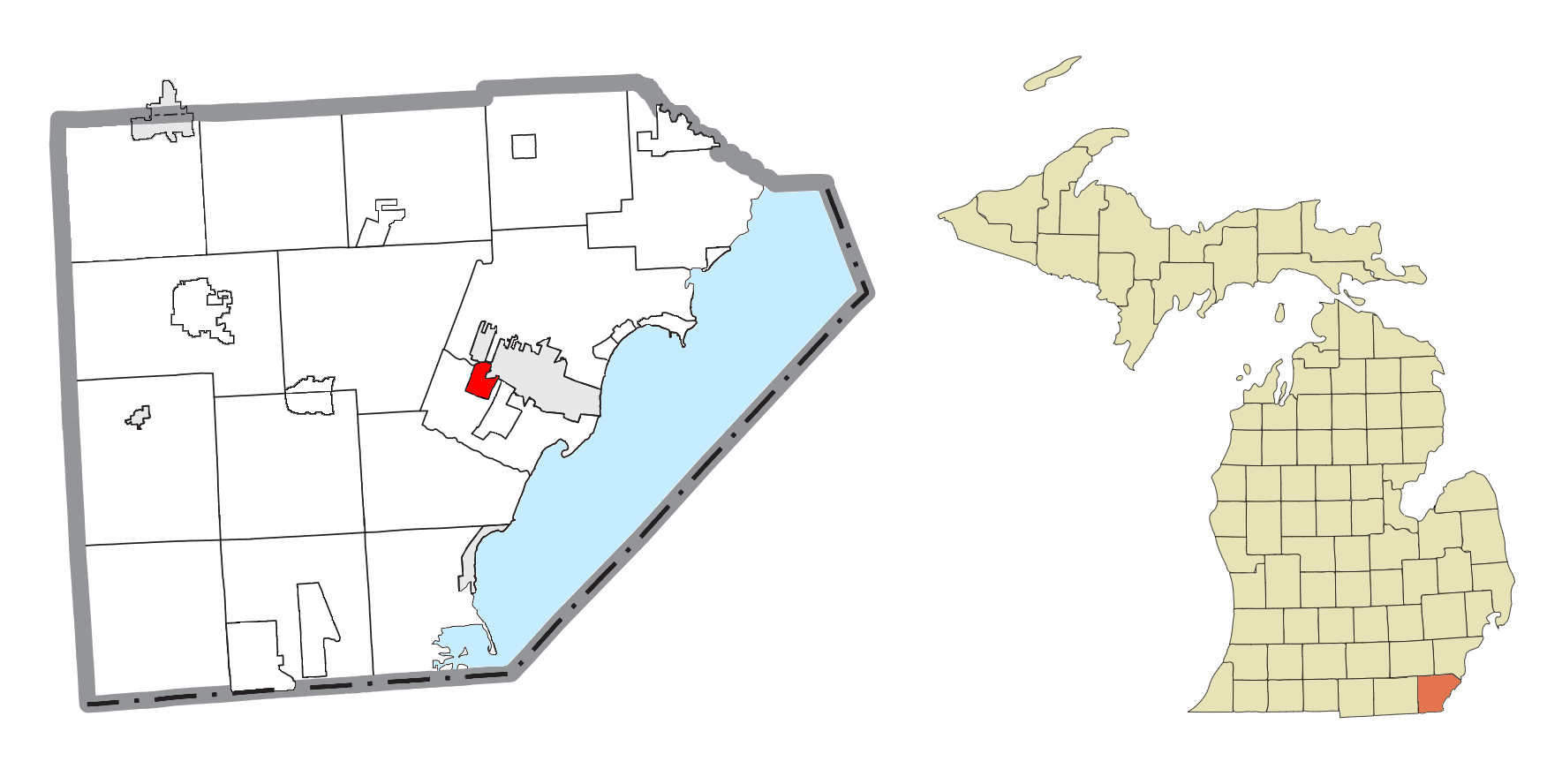
- Location within Monroe County

- Location within the state of Michigan Location within the United States
- Coordinates: 41°54′50″N 83°25′54″W
- Country: United States
- State: Michigan
- County: Monroe
- Township: Monroe

Area
  - Total: 1.27 sq mi (3.29 km^{2})
  - Land: 1.25 sq mi (3.24 km^{2})
  - Water: 0.019 sq mi (0.05 km^{2})
- Elevation: 600 ft (183 m)

Population (2020)
  - Total: 3,227
  - Density: 2,579.3/sq mi (995.89/km^{2})
- Time zone: UTC-5 (Eastern (EST))
  - Summer (DST): UTC-4 (EDT)
- ZIP code(s): 48161 (Monroe)
- Area code: 734
- FIPS code: 26-86050
- GNIS feature ID: 1867326

West Monroe is an unincorporated community and census-designated place (CDP) in Monroe County in the U.S. state of Michigan. The population was 3,227 at the 2020 census. The CDP is located within Monroe Charter Township.

== Geography ==
According to the U.S. Census Bureau, the CDP has a total area of 1.27 square miles (3.29 km^{2}), of which 1.25 square miles (3.24 km^{2}) is land and 0.02 square miles (0.05 km^{2}) (1.60%) is water.

=== Major highways ===
- US 24 (Telegraph Road) forms most of the eastern boundary of the CDP.
- M-50 (S. Custer Road) runs east–west through the northern portion of the CDP.

== Demographics ==
Historical population
Census	Pop.	Note	%±
1990	3,919		—
2000	3,893		−0.7%
2010	3,503		−10.0%
2020	3,227		−7.9%
U.S. Decennial Census

=== 2020 census ===
As of the 2020 census, West Monroe had a population of 3,227. The median age was 34.2 years. 24.5% of residents were under the age of 18 and 13.3% of residents were 65 years of age or older. For every 100 females there were 101.9 males, and for every 100 females age 18 and over there were 100.2 males age 18 and over.

100.0% of residents lived in urban areas, while 0.0% lived in rural areas.

There were 1,238 households in West Monroe, of which 31.6% had children under the age of 18 living in them. Of all households, 37.6% were married-couple households, 22.6% were households with a male householder and no spouse or partner present, and 26.3% were households with a female householder and no spouse or partner present. About 26.1% of all households were made up of individuals and 8.9% had someone living alone who was 65 years of age or older.

There were 1,352 housing units, of which 8.4% were vacant. The homeowner vacancy rate was 0.9% and the rental vacancy rate was 9.1%.

Racial composition as of the 2020 census
Race	Number	Percent
White	2,747	85.1%
Black or African American	140	4.3%
American Indian and Alaska Native	16	0.5%
Asian	8	0.2%
Native Hawaiian and Other Pacific Islander	1	0.0%
Some other race	64	2.0%
Two or more races	251	7.8%
Hispanic or Latino (of any race)	189	5.9%

=== 2000 census ===
As of the census of 2000, there were 3,893 people, 1,505 households, and 1,044 families residing in the CDP. The population density was 3,100.4 inhabitants per square mile (1,197.1/km^{2}). There were 1,599 housing units at an average density of 1,273.5 per square mile (491.7/km^{2}). The racial makeup of the CDP was 96.48% White, 0.98% African American, 0.26% Native American, 0.64% Asian, 0.69% from other races, and 0.95% from two or more races. Hispanic or Latino of any race were 1.77% of the population.

There were 1,505 households, out of which 36.7% had children under the age of 18 living with them, 48.6% were married couples living together, 13.9% had a female householder with no husband present, and 30.6% were non-families. 25.3% of all households were made up of individuals, and 7.9% had someone living alone who was 65 years of age or older. The average household size was 2.59 and the average family size was 3.09.

In the CDP, the population was spread out, with 28.1% under the age of 18, 10.7% from 18 to 24, 32.1% from 25 to 44, 19.7% from 45 to 64, and 9.4% who were 65 years of age or older. The median age was 32 years. For every 100 females, there were 97.1 males. For every 100 females age 18 and over, there were 93.4 males.

The median income for a household in the CDP was $42,986, and the median income for a family was $48,628. Males had a median income of $39,958 versus $25,635 for females. The per capita income for the CDP was $20,067. About 7.9% of families and 12.0% of the population were below the poverty line, including 17.0% of those under age 18 and 7.4% of those age 65 or over.
