= South Monroe, Michigan =

- Census-designated place (CDP) & unincorporated community
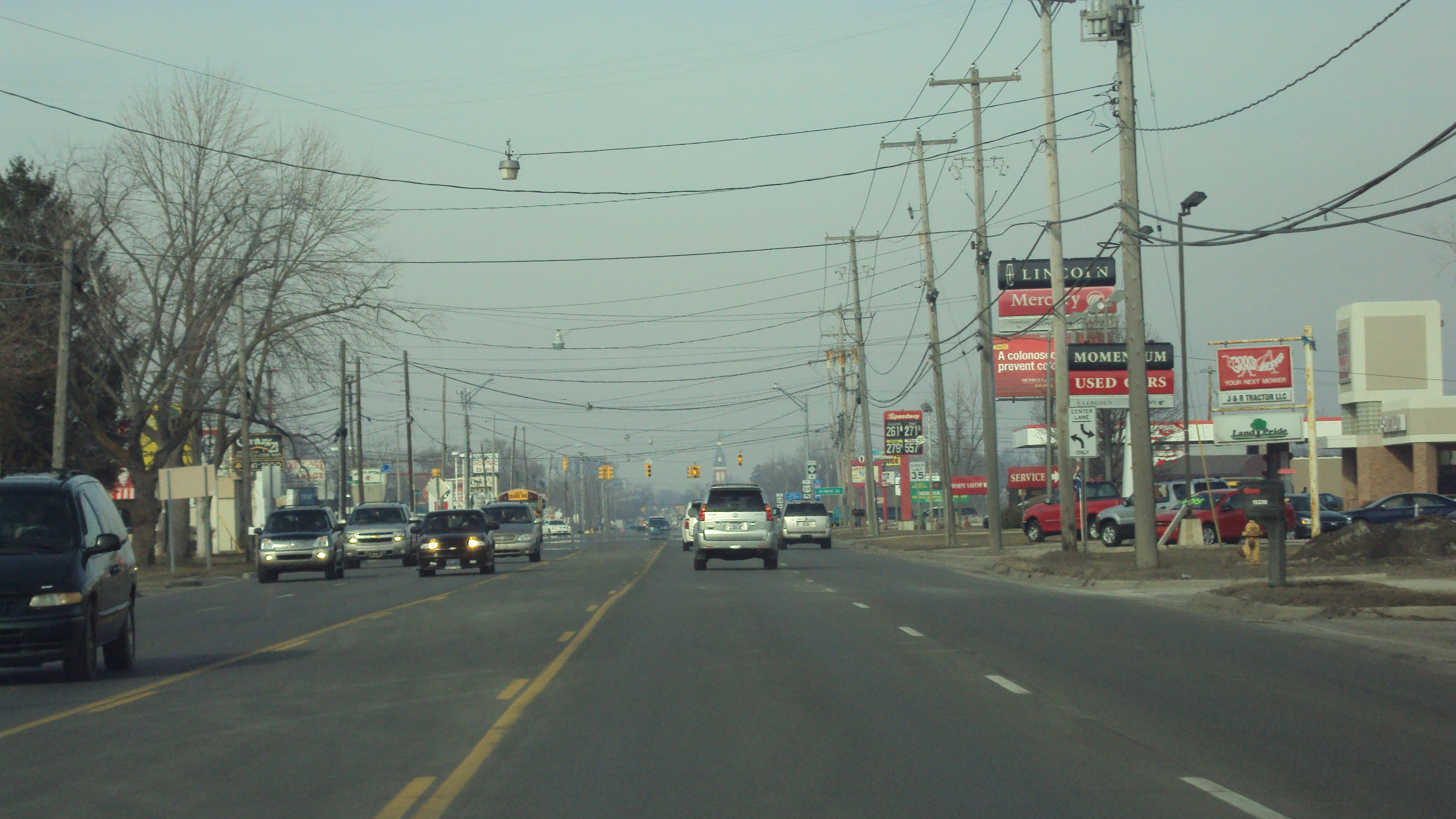
- South Monroe looking north along M-125

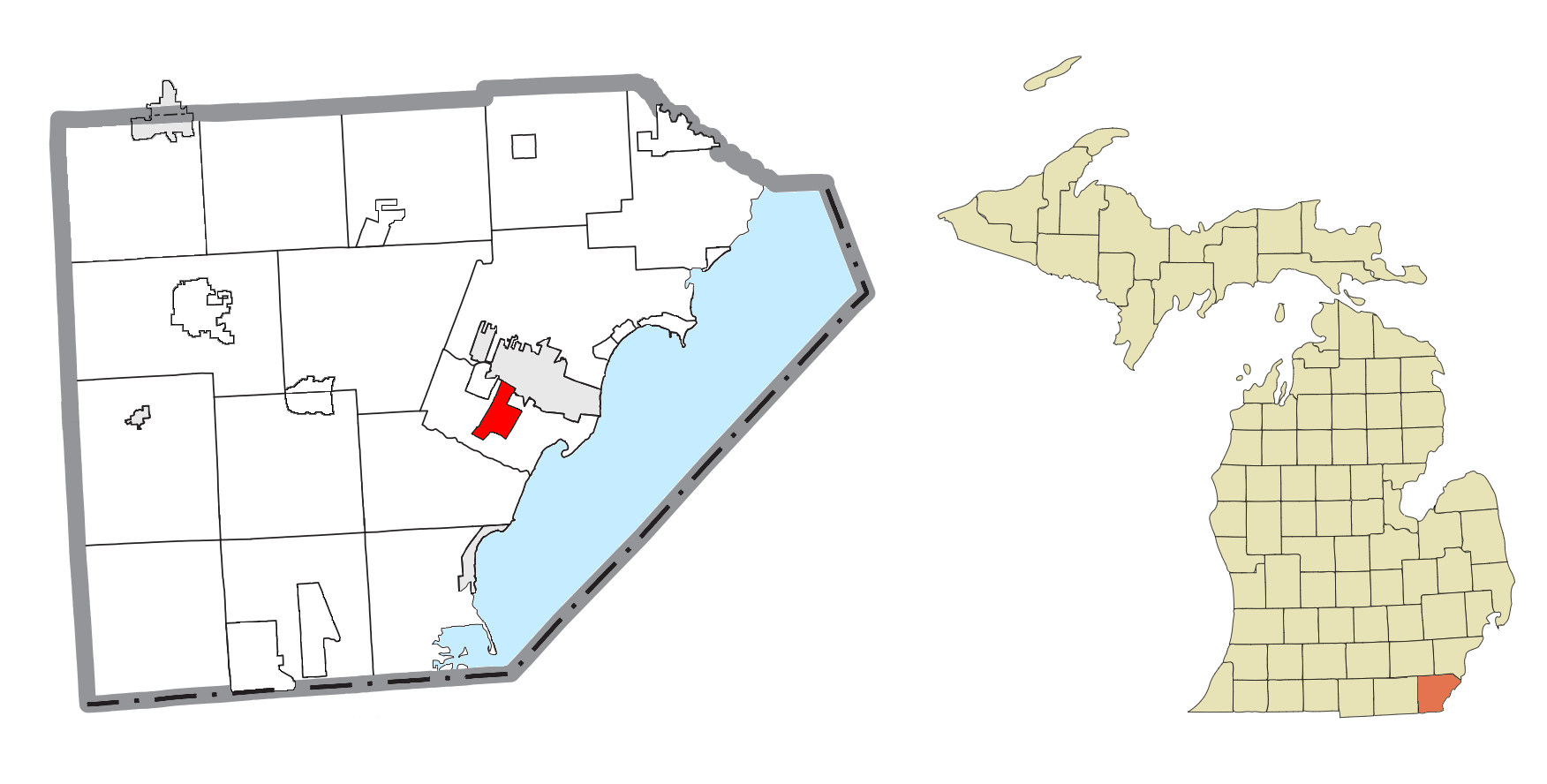
- Location within Monroe County

- Location within the state of Michigan Location within the United States
- Coordinates: 41°53′45″N 83°25′04″W
- Country: United States
- State: Michigan
- County: Monroe
- Township: Monroe

Area
  - Total: 2.43 sq mi (6.29 km^{2})
  - Land: 2.43 sq mi (6.29 km^{2})
  - Water: 0 sq mi (0.00 km^{2})
- Elevation: 597 ft (182 m)

Population (2020)
  - Total: 6,468
  - Density: 2,663.4/sq mi (1,028.36/km^{2})
- Time zone: UTC-5 (Eastern (EST))
  - Summer (DST): UTC-4 (EDT)
- ZIP code(s): 48161 (Monroe)
- Area code: 734
- FIPS code: 26-75140
- GNIS feature ID: 1867324

South Monroe is an unincorporated community and census-designated place (CDP) in Monroe County in the U.S. state of Michigan. The population was 6,468 at the 2020 census. The CDP is located within Monroe Charter Township.

== Geography ==
According to the U.S. Census Bureau, the CDP has a total area of 2.43 square miles (6.29 km^{2}), all land.

=== Major highways ===
- US 24 (Telegraph Road) runs briefly along the southwestern boundary of the CDP.
- M-125 (S. Dixie Highway) runs south–north through the center of the CDP.

== Demographics ==
Historical population
Census	Pop.	Note	%±
1990	5,266		—
2000	6,370		21.0%
2010	6,433		1.0%
2020	6,468		0.5%
U.S. Decennial Census

=== 2020 census ===
As of the 2020 census, South Monroe had a population of 6,468. The median age was 43.6 years. 20.2% of residents were under the age of 18 and 22.3% of residents were 65 years of age or older. For every 100 females there were 88.0 males, and for every 100 females age 18 and over there were 86.6 males age 18 and over.

100.0% of residents lived in urban areas, while 0.0% lived in rural areas.

There were 2,841 households in South Monroe, of which 24.3% had children under the age of 18 living in them. Of all households, 38.8% were married-couple households, 19.7% were households with a male householder and no spouse or partner present, and 34.4% were households with a female householder and no spouse or partner present. About 36.7% of all households were made up of individuals and 19.3% had someone living alone who was 65 years of age or older.

There were 2,993 housing units, of which 5.1% were vacant. The homeowner vacancy rate was 1.7% and the rental vacancy rate was 2.7%.

Racial composition as of the 2020 census
Race	Number	Percent
White	5,600	86.6%
Black or African American	306	4.7%
American Indian and Alaska Native	20	0.3%
Asian	49	0.8%
Native Hawaiian and Other Pacific Islander	0	0.0%
Some other race	87	1.3%
Two or more races	406	6.3%
Hispanic or Latino (of any race)	253	3.9%

=== 2000 census ===
As of the census of 2000, there were 6,370 people, 2,605 households, and 1,740 families residing in the CDP. The population density was 2,675.9 inhabitants per square mile (1,033.2/km^{2}). There were 2,702 housing units at an average density of 1,135.1 per square mile (438.3/km^{2}). The racial makeup of the CDP was 92.68% White, 2.94% African American, 0.19% Native American, 1.18% Asian, 0.02% Pacific Islander, 1.16% from other races, and 1.84% from two or more races. Hispanic or Latino of any race were 2.42% of the population.

There were 2,605 households, out of which 31.5% had children under the age of 18 living with them, 49.6% were married couples living together, 13.8% had a female householder with no husband present, and 33.2% were non-families. 29.6% of all households were made up of individuals, and 14.9% had someone living alone who was 65 years of age or older. The average household size was 2.40 and the average family size was 2.96.

In the CDP, the population was spread out, with 25.4% under the age of 18, 7.8% from 18 to 24, 27.6% from 25 to 44, 22.2% from 45 to 64, and 17.1% who were 65 years of age or older. The median age was 38 years. For every 100 females, there were 85.0 males. For every 100 females age 18 and over, there were 80.3 males.

The median income for a household in the CDP was $43,665, and the median income for a family was $54,042. Males had a median income of $46,286 versus $26,490 for females. The per capita income for the CDP was $23,490. About 8.5% of families and 10.6% of the population were below the poverty line, including 15.1% of those under age 18 and 9.2% of those age 65 or over.
