= Federmann =

Federmann is a surname of German origin. Notable people with the surname include:

- Michael Federmann (born 1943), Israeli businessman and billionaire
- Nikolaus Federmann (c. 1505-1542), German adventurer and conquistador

== See also ==
- Federman
