= Boston Custer =

Soldier and brother of George Armstrong Custer

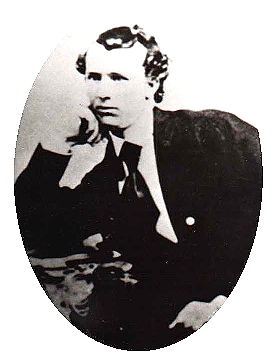
- Boston Custer
- Born: October 31, 1848; New Rumley, Ohio, U.S.
- Died: June 25, 1876 (aged 27); Little Bighorn, Montana Territory, U.S.
- Burial place: Woodland Cemetery, Monroe, Michigan
- Military career
- Allegiance: United States
- Rank: Civilian contractor
- Units: 7th U.S. Cavalry, 1874 - 1876
- Conflicts: Indian Wars; Battle of the Little Bighorn †

Boston Custer (October 31, 1848 – June 25, 1876) was the youngest brother of U.S. Army Lt. Colonel George Armstrong Custer and two-time Medal of Honor recipient Captain Thomas Custer. He was killed at the Battle of the Little Bighorn along with his two brothers.

== Early life ==
Boston Custer was born in New Rumley, Ohio, one of five children born to Emanuel Henry Custer and Maria Ward Kirkpatrick Custer. In 1863, the family left Ohio and moved to Monroe, Michigan. Boston's older brother Nevin became a farmer due to asthma and rheumatism, while two other older brothers, George and Thomas ("Tom"), became military officers in the Union Army during the American Civil War. Boston had been unable to officially join the Army due to poor health.

== Battle ==
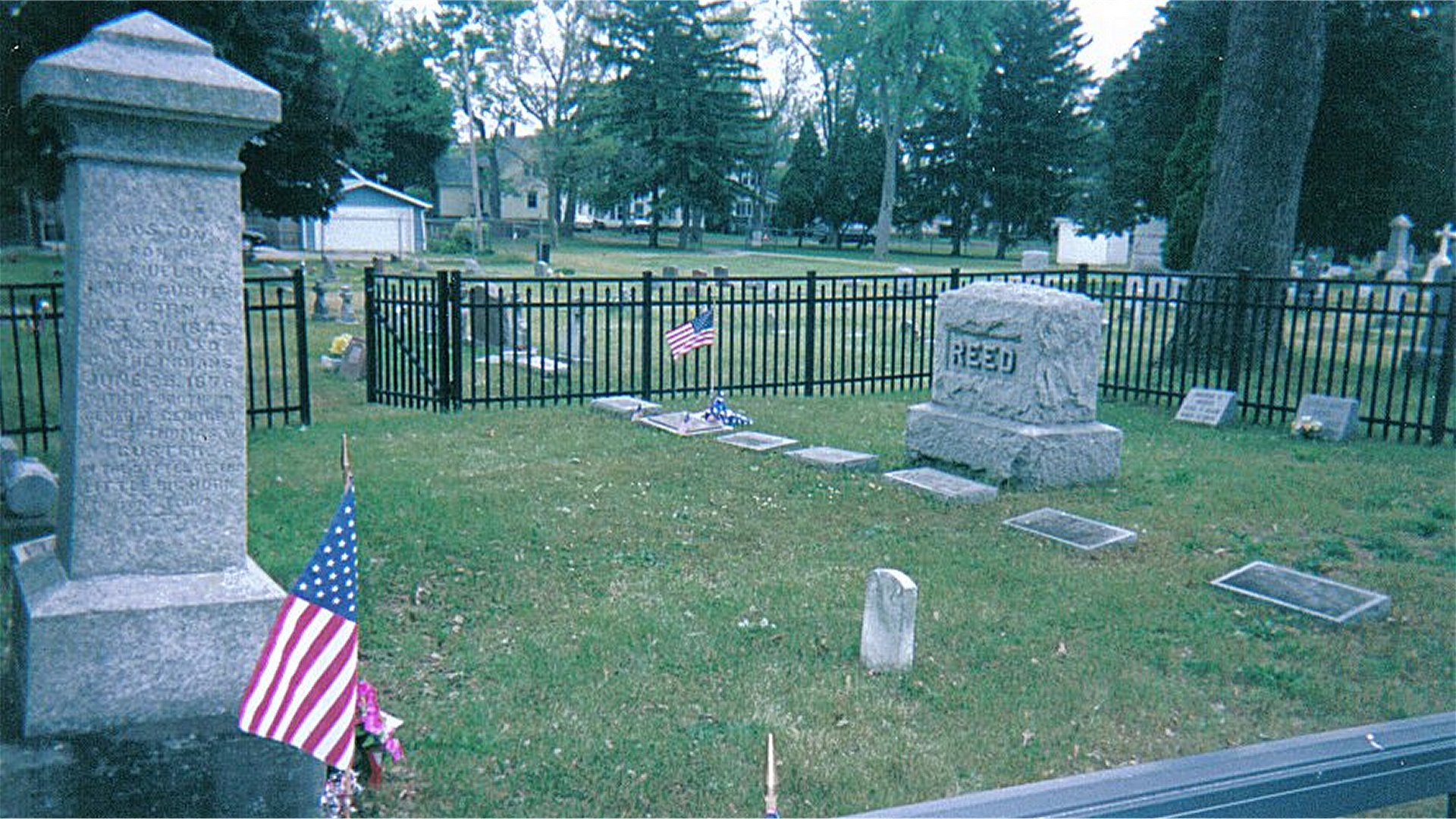
Boston Custer's headstone (on the far left) at the Woodland Cemetery in Monroe, Michigan.

A civilian contractor, Custer served as forage master for his brother George's U.S. 7th Cavalry Regiment in the 1874 Black Hills expedition. He was employed as a guide, forager, packer and scout for the regiment for the 1876 expedition against the Lakota Indians. On June 25, 1876, along with his 18-year-old nephew Henry Armstrong "Autie" Reed, Custer was with the pack train at the rear of Lt. Col. George Custer's troops. Hearing from a messenger that Lt. Col. Custer had requested ammunition for an impending fight, they quickly left the pack train. The pair passed by Frederick Benteen's detachment and joined Custer's main column as it moved into position to attack a sprawling Indian village along the Little Bighorn River. Had they stayed with the pack train where they were assigned, Boston Custer and Autie Reed might have survived the battle.

== Death ==
Like his brothers and nephew, Boston was killed at the area known as "Last Stand Hill." A marble marker commemorates the approximate place where his body was found and identified. Though originally buried on the battlefield, Autie Reed and Boston Custer's remains were exhumed, the only exceptions to the rule that only commissioned officers would be shipped home for reburial. They were reinterred January 8, 1878, at Woodland Cemetery in Monroe, Michigan, near today's Monroe County, Michigan Museum.

== Film ==
Boston Custer was portrayed by actor Patrick Johnston in the TV miniseries Son of the Morning Star (1991).

== Bibliography ==
- Custer, Boston & O'Neill, Thomas (Editor) (1993). Letters from Boston Custer. Brooklyn, NY: Arrow and Trooper.
