= Federman, Michigan =

- Ghost town
- Location within the state of Michigan Location within the United States
- Coordinates: 41°54′21″N 83°37′28″W
- Country: United States
- State: Michigan
- County: Monroe
- Township: Ida
- Settled: 1884
- Time zone: UTC-5 (Eastern (EST))
  - Summer (DST): UTC-4 (EDT)
- ZIP code(s): 49270 (Petersburg)
- Area code: 734

Federman was an unincorporated community in Monroe County, Michigan. It was located where the Lake Shore and Michigan Southern Railroad and the Toledo, Ann Arbor and Northern Michigan Railroad intersected. It was formed in 1884 and had a post office from 1899 until 1906. It is now abandoned.

== Sources ==
- Romig, Walter (1986). Michigan Place Names. Detroit: Wayne State University Press. p. 193. ISBN 978-0-8143-1838-6 – via Google Books.
