= Woodland Cemetery (Monroe, Michigan) =

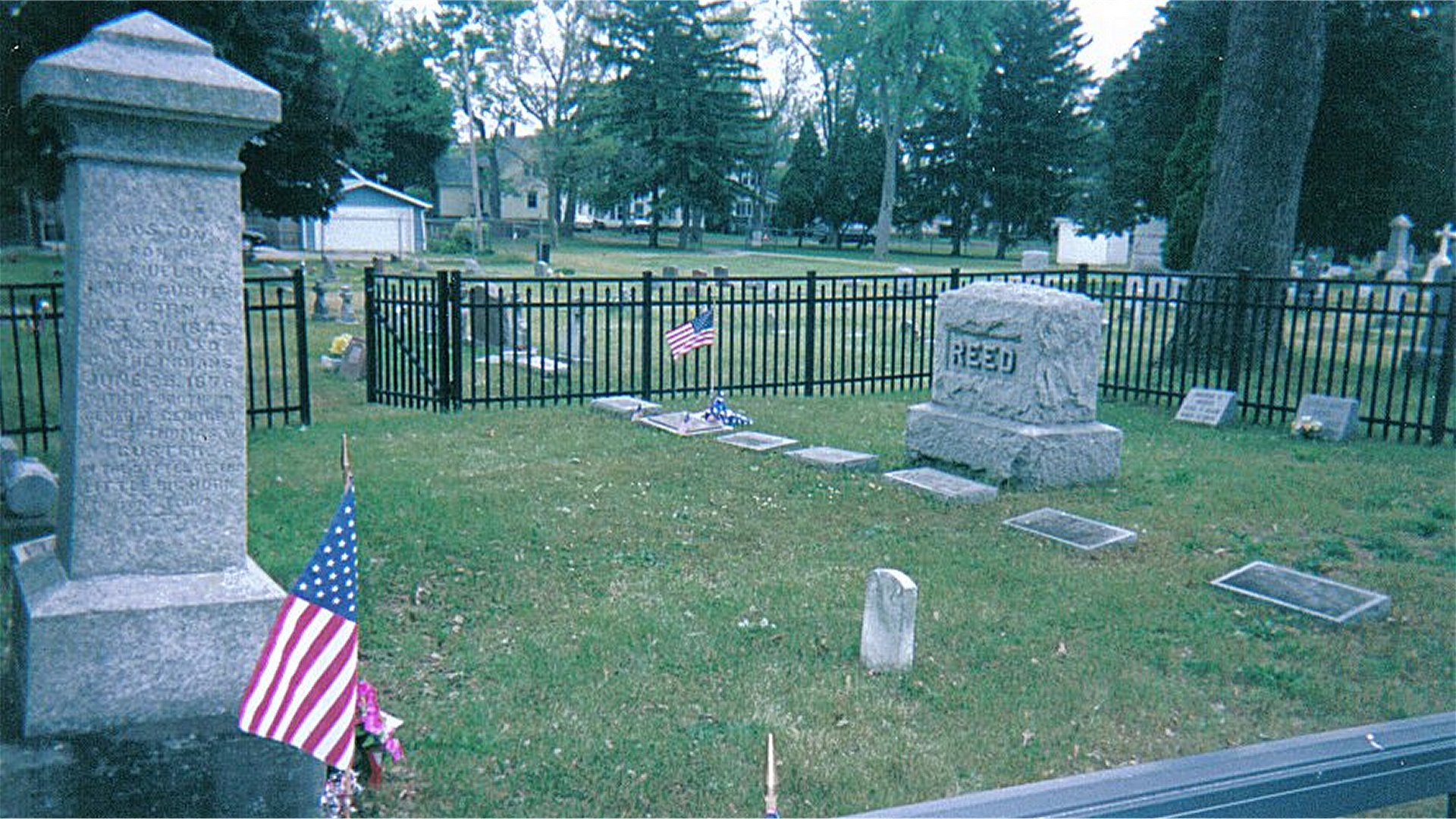
- Custer family plot, including Boston Custer and Henry Armstrong Reed
- Interactive map of Woodland Cemetery

Details
- Established: 1810
- Location: 428 Jerome Street; Monroe, Michigan
- Country: United States
- Coordinates: 41°54′26″N 83°23′34″W
- Type: Public cemetery (active)
- Owned by: City of Monroe
- Size: 10 acres (4.0 ha)
- No. of graves: 6,500+
- Find a Grave: Woodland Cemetery
- The Political Graveyard: Woodland Cemetery

Woodland Cemetery (formerly known as Grove Cemetery and Woodlawn Cemetery) is a public, city-owned cemetery located at 428 Jerome Street in the city of Monroe in the U.S. state of Michigan. It occupies 10 acres (4.0 ha) and contains over 6,500 graves. Founded in 1810, it is one of Michigan's oldest public cemeteries. Its oldest burials are veterans who served in the American Revolutionary War. Woodland Cemetery was designated as a Michigan State Historic Site on July 21, 1988.

Many of Monroe's earliest settlers, politicians, and war combatants are buried at Woodland Cemetery, including some of those that were killed during the Battle of Frenchtown in 1813. The cemetery contains Monroe veterans from every major war from the American Revolutionary War to the Vietnam War. A notable burial plot belongs to the families of Monroe residents George Armstrong Custer and his wife Elizabeth Bacon Custer, although neither of those two are buried at Woodland Cemetery. His younger brother, Boston Custer, and his nephew, Henry Armstrong Reed, are buried at Woodland Cemetery after having died alongside George Custer at the Battle of the Little Bighorn in the Montana Territory on June 25, 1876.

Woodland Cemetery is located right next to the Zion Lutheran Cemetery, but the two are separate cemeteries.

== Notable burials ==
- George Alford (d. 1836), a minuteman in the American Revolutionary War and the only known Monroe soldier to have served in the Continental Army under the direct command of General George Washington
- Daniel S. Bacon (1789–1866), father of Elizabeth Bacon and father-in-law of George Armstrong Custer
- Isaac P. Christiancy (1812–1890), Chief Justice of the Michigan State Supreme Court and member of the United States Senate
- Boston Custer (1848–1876), younger brother of George Armstrong Custer and soldier killed at the Battle of the Little Bighorn
- Robert Scott Duncanson (1821–1872), one of the first African American painters to garner international acclaim
- James H. Gilmore, mayor of Monroe from 1922–1925 and 1930–1931
- David A. Noble (1802–1876), lawyer, mayor of Monroe, and representative in the United States Congress
- Heman J. Redfield (1823–1883), former mayor of Monroe and member of the Michigan Senate
- Henry Armstrong Reed (1858–1876), nephew of George Armstrong Custer and civilian casualty at the Battle of the Little Bighorn
- Jesse Hart Root (d. 1934), federal judge in Michigan and delegate at the 1932 Republican National Convention
- George Spalding (1836–1915), American Civil War officer and later a representative in the United States Congress
- Edwin Willits (1830–1896), lawyer, local politician, and later representative in the United States Congress
- Austin Eli Wing (1792–1849), Congressional delegate and member of the Michigan House of Representatives
