= Henry Armstrong Reed =

American soldier (1858–1876)

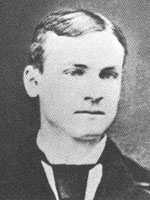
- Henry Armstrong "Autie" Reed
- Born: April 27, 1858; Monroe, Michigan
- Died: June 25, 1876 (aged 18); Little Bighorn, Montana
- Burial place: Woodland Cemetery; Monroe, Michigan
- Military career
- Allegiance: United States
- Branch: United States Army
- Service years: May 10 – June 25, 1876
- Nickname: Autie
- Unit: 7th Cavalry Regiment
- Conflicts: Great Sioux War of 1876–77: Battle of the Little Bighorn †

Henry Armstrong Reed (April 27, 1858 – June 25, 1876) was the nephew of George Armstrong Custer, Thomas Custer, and Boston Custer. Although not an official soldier, he was killed along with them at the Battle of the Little Bighorn at the age of 18.

== Early life ==
Henry Reed was born on April 27, 1858, in Monroe, Michigan. While he had several sisters, he was the only son of David and Lydia Reed. At a young age, he was nicknamed "Autie" by his mother— a nickname of his middle name Armstrong, which was shared with his uncle George Armstrong Custer.

== Indian wars ==
Heavily influenced by his military uncles, he followed in their footsteps and left Monroe in May 1876, with his sister Emma, for Fort Abraham Lincoln in the Dakota Territory. There, he was hired on May 10 to serve as a beef herder for the 7th Cavalry Regiment, which was under the command of George Armstrong Custer.

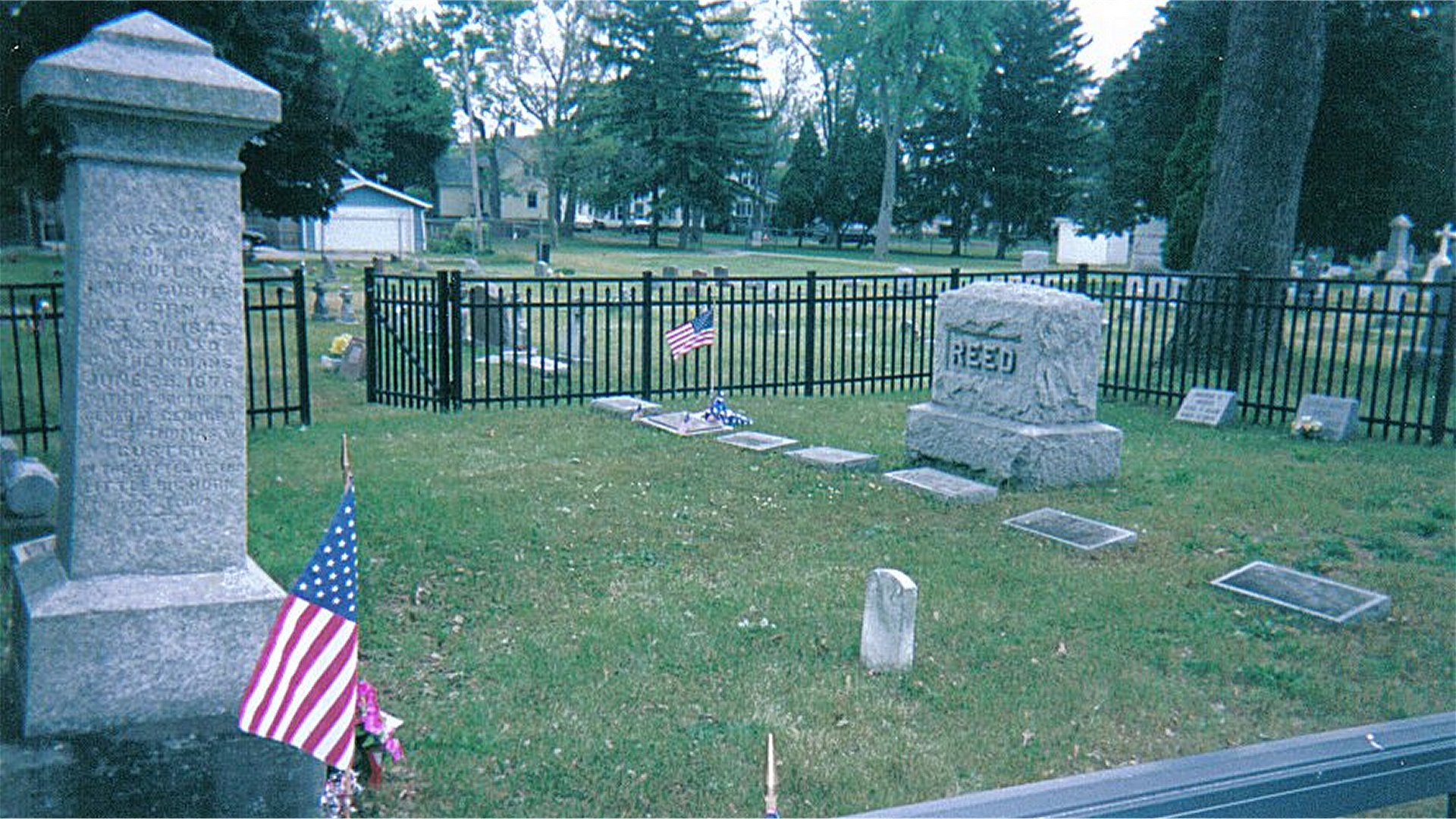
Reed is buried with other family members at the Woodland Cemetery in Monroe, Michigan. His headstone is on the far right with the flower.

Reed joined the 7th Cavalry Regiment shortly after the start of the Great Sioux War of 1876–77 in the Montana Territory, part of the larger American Indian Wars. While Reed was never officially enlisted as a soldier, he volunteered his services as such for the Battle of the Little Bighorn on June 25, 1876. Under normal circumstances, this would have been prohibited, but since he was part of the "Custer Clan" with his three uncles, he was granted permission by them to participate in the battle. The regiment's orderly, John Burkman, argued for Reed to stay back with the herding train where he belonged. Burkman himself was ordered to stay behind, and Reed taunted him by saying, "You're mad because you can't go along", before riding off on his horse for combat.

== Death ==
The Battle of the Little Bighorn proved a disastrous defeat for the 7th Cavalry Regiment. Reed was killed, as were all three of his uncles who fought in that battle— George, Boston, and Thomas— and Reed's uncle-in-law James Calhoun. Reed was killed atop Last Stand Hill; his head was scalped and body was mutilated by the victorious Indian forces, as were the majority of those killed in the battle. A marble marker was erected at the exact site where his body was recovered several days later.

He was originally buried on the battlefield, but a year later, his body was exhumed and interred at the Woodland Cemetery in his hometown of Monroe, Michigan, while the marble marker remains in its location in the present-day Little Bighorn Battlefield National Monument. His removed scalp was previously on display at the Museum of World Treasures in Wichita, Kansas.
