= Ida Township, Michigan =

- Civil township
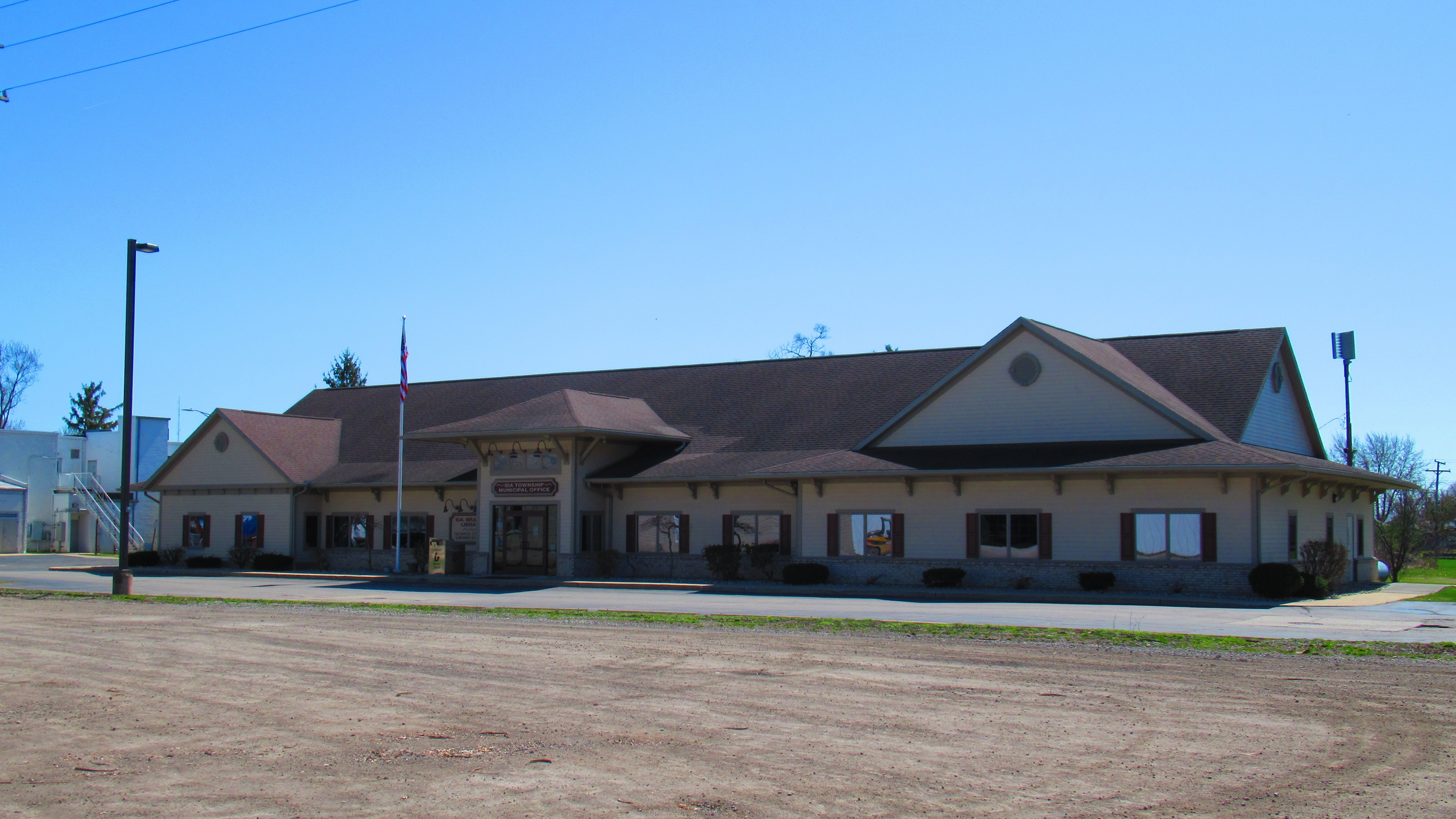
- Ida Township Municipal Office & Library in Ida

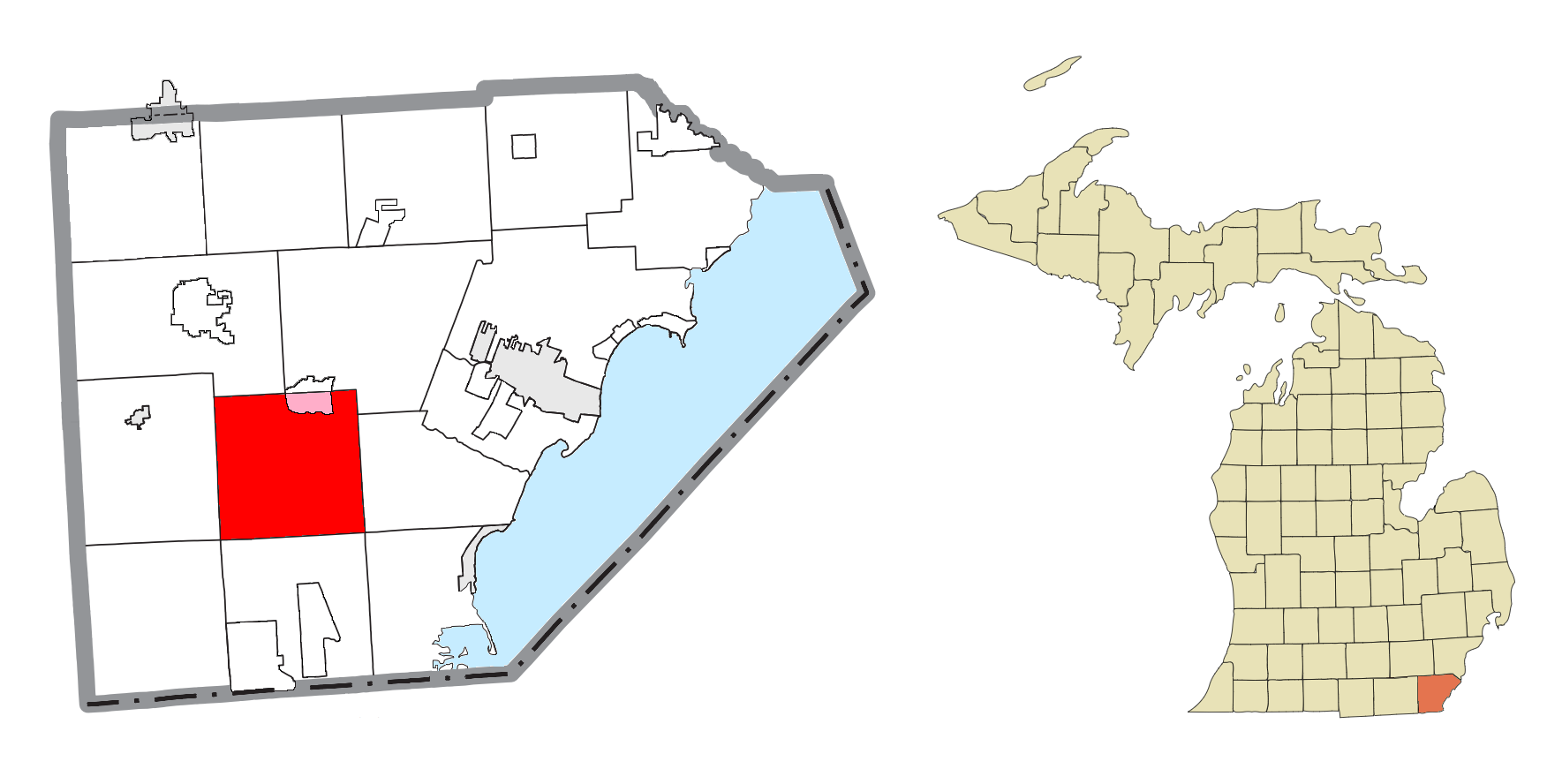
- Left: Location within Monroe County (red) and an administered portion of the CDP of Ida (pink); Right: Location in the state of Michigan

- Location within Michigan Location within the United States
- Coordinates: 41°51′56″N 83°35′19″W
- Country: United States
- State: Michigan
- County: Monroe
- Organized: 1837

Government
  - Supervisor: Paul Metz
  - Clerk: Tera Shaffer

Area
  - Total: 36.92 sq mi (95.62 km^{2})
  - Land: 36.75 sq mi (95.18 km^{2})
  - Water: 0.17 sq mi (0.44 km^{2})
- Elevation: 640 ft (195 m)

Population (2020)
  - Total: 4,783
  - Density: 130.2/sq mi (50.3/km^{2})
- Time zone: UTC-5 (Eastern (EST))
  - Summer (DST): UTC-4 (EDT)
- ZIP Codes: 48140 (Ida); 48182 (Temperance); 49270 (Petersburg); 48161 (Monroe)
- Area code: 734
- FIPS code: 26-115-40260
- GNIS feature ID: 1626508
- Website: idatownshipmi.gov

Ida Township is a civil township of Monroe County in the U.S. state of Michigan. The population was 4,783 at the 2020 census. The township was organized in 1837 and named after local civic leader Ida M. Taylor.

== Communities ==
- Federman was a community located at 41°54′21″N 83°37′28″W. The community contained its own railway station. The station served as an intersection that linked the Ann Arbor Railroad and New York Central lines. Federman had its own post office briefly from June 22, 1899, to August 31, 1906.
- Ida is an unincorporated community and census-designated place on the northern boundary of the township at 41°54′39″N 83°34′25″W. The community of Ida was listed as a new census-designated place for the 2020 census.
- Ida Center is an unincorporated community located near the center of the township along the intersection of Ida Center Road and Lewis Avenue at 41°51′58″N 83°34′17″W.
- Lulu is an unincorporated community along Douglas Road and Lulu Road just northwest of the township center at 41°52′47″N 83°36′39″W. In 1853, Henry West came to the township and purchased a large plot of land in what would become the community of Lulu. The community contained a train depot along the Toledo and Ann Arbor Railroad about 10 miles (16 km) south of the village of Dundee. A post office began operating in Lulu on June 29, 1880, with storekeeper Paul Nill as the first postmaster, and it operated until July 15, 1941. The railway line continues to run through the community and is operated by the Ann Arbor Railroad but no longer contains a station or stop in the community.
- Yargerville is an unincorporated community centered at the intersection of East Morocco / Wood Road and Minx Road along the eastern boundary of the township with La Salle Township at 41°50′18″N 83°31′55″W. Yargerville contained its own post office from 1890 to 1906.

== Geography ==
The township is in central Monroe County, about 11 miles (18 km) west-southwest of Monroe, the county seat. According to the U.S. Census Bureau, the township has a total area of 36.92 square miles (95.62 km^{2}), of which 36.75 square miles (95.18 km^{2}) are land and 0.17 square miles (0.44 km^{2}), or 0.47%, are water.

== Demographics ==
Historical population
Census	Pop.	Note	%±
1850	345		—
1860	673		95.1%
1870	1,020		51.6%
1880	1,369		34.2%
1890	1,410		3.0%
1900	1,809		28.3%
1910	1,653		−8.6%
1920	1,587		−4.0%
1930	1,735		9.3%
1940	1,971		13.6%
1950	2,057		4.4%
1960	2,600		26.4%
1970	3,377		29.9%
1980	4,467		32.3%
1990	4,554		1.9%
2000	4,949		8.7%
2010	4,964		0.3%
2020	4,783		−3.6%
U.S. Decennial Census

As of the census of 2000, there were 4,949 people, 1,622 households, and 1,373 families residing in the township. The population density was 134.7 inhabitants per square mile (52.0/km^{2}). There were 1,655 housing units at an average density of 45.0 per square mile (17.4/km^{2}). The racial makeup of the township was 98.48% White, 0.14% African American, 0.16% Native American, 0.20% Asian, 0.51% from other races, and 0.51% from two or more races. Hispanic or Latino of any race were 1.25% of the population.

There were 1,622 households, out of which 41.7% had children under the age of 18 living with them, 75.2% were married couples living together, 5.6% had a female householder with no husband present, and 15.3% were non-families. 12.4% of all households were made up of individuals, and 5.4% had someone living alone who was 65 years of age or older. The average household size was 3.03 and the average family size was 3.32.

In the township the population was spread out, with 29.5% under the age of 18, 8.1% from 18 to 24, 29.0% from 25 to 44, 25.2% from 45 to 64, and 8.3% who were 65 years of age or older. The median age was 36 years. For every 100 females, there were 105.2 males. For every 100 females age 18 and over, there were 102.8 males.

The median income for a household in the township was $57,106, and the median income for a family was $60,990. Males had a median income of $46,130 versus $28,456 for females. The per capita income for the township was $21,074. About 1.9% of families and 2.6% of the population were below the poverty line, including 1.7% of those under age 18 and 4.4% of those age 65 or over.

== Education ==
The majority of the township is served by Ida Public Schools, which has all three schools within one campus near the center of the community of Ida along Lewis Avenue. One of Ida's biggest rivals is Dundee Community Schools. The district also serves a small area of several neighboring townships. A small portion of the western portion of Ida Township is served by Summerfield Schools in Summerfield Township to the west.

Previously, St. Anthony School of the Roman Catholic Archdiocese of Detroit was in Temperance. Its service area included Ida Township.

== Images ==
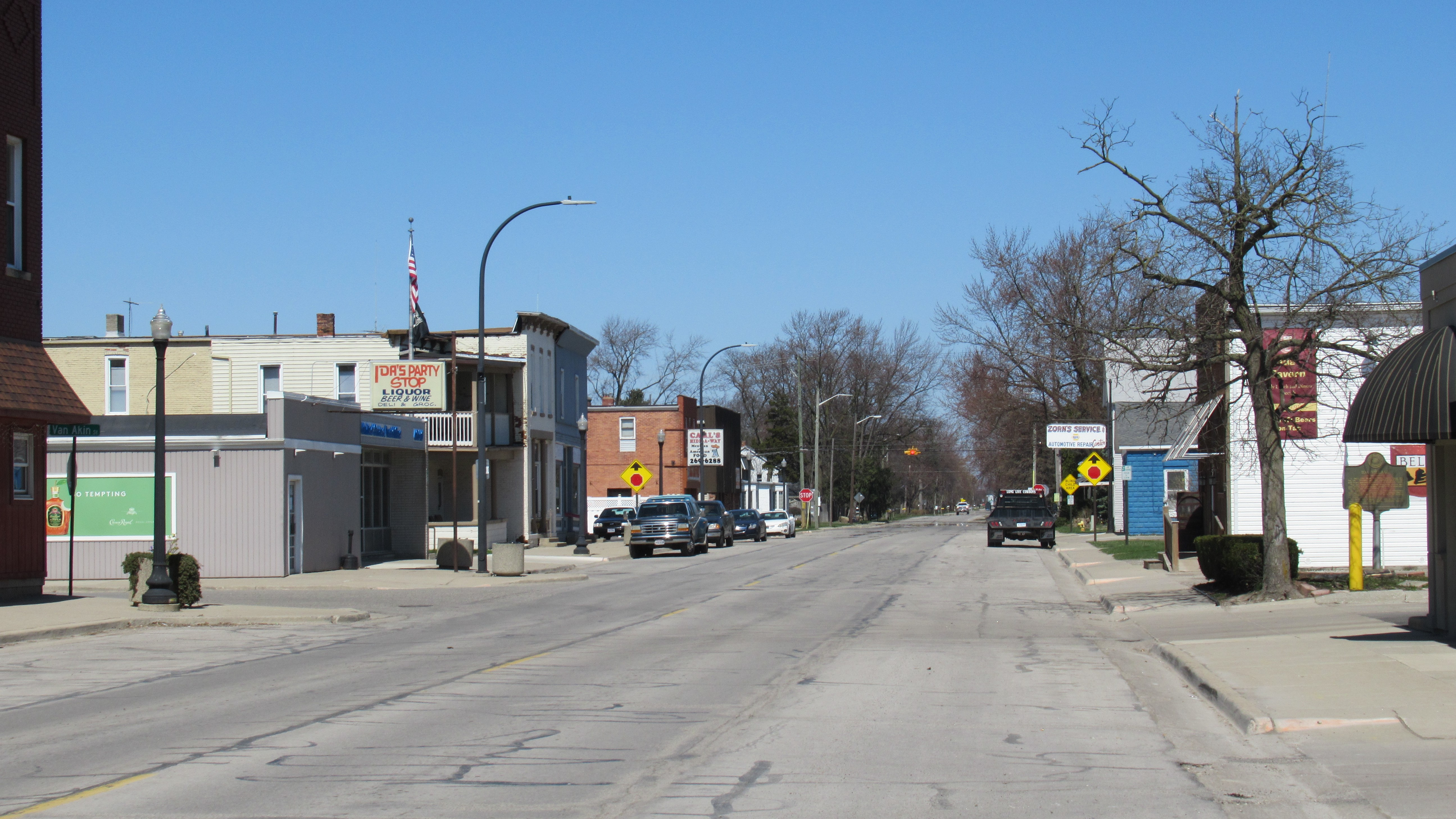
Community of Ida in 2020

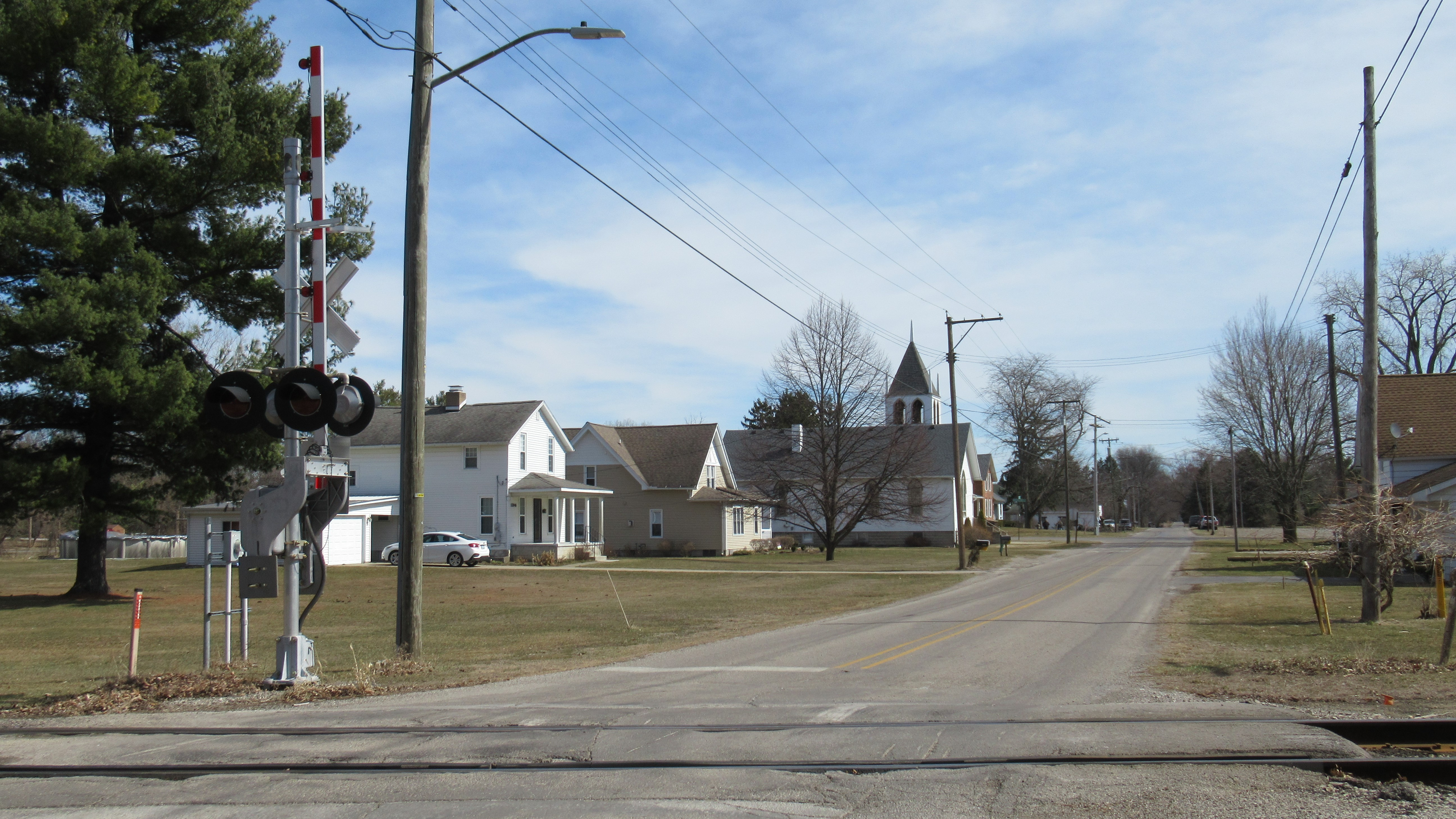
Community of Lulu in 2021

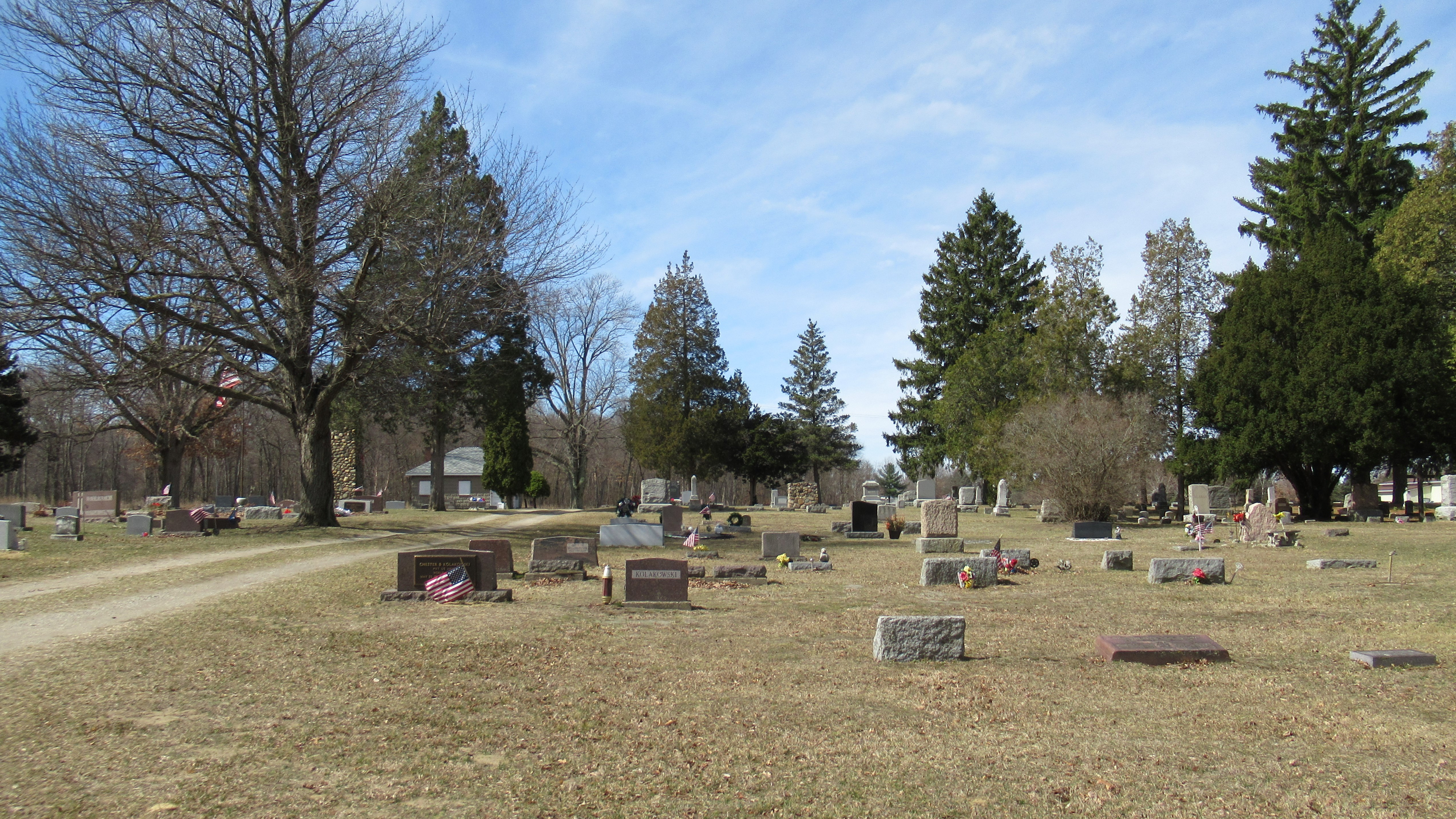
Lulu Cemetery
