= Summerfield School District =

School district in Michigan

Address
- 17555 Ida West Road Petersburg, Monroe County, Michigan, 49270; United States
- Coordinates: 41°54′19″N 83°42′08″W

District information
- Grades: PreKindergarten–12
- Superintendent: August Ost
- Schools: 2
- Budget: $9,012,000 2022–2023 expenditures
- NCES District ID: 2633120

Students and staff
- Students: 567 (2024–2025)
- Teachers: 35.28 (on an FTE basis) (2024–2025)
- Staff: 93.57 FTE (2024–2025)
- Student–teacher ratio: 16.07 (2024–2025)
- District mascot: Bulldogs
- Colors: Orange and Black

Other information
- Website: www.summerfield.k12.mi.us

Summerfield School District is a public school district in Monroe County, Michigan. It serves Petersburg and parts of the townships of Dundee, Ida, and Summerfield.

== History ==
At the time of its opening in fall 1975, Summerfield High School housed grades 9-12 and the district's other school was an elementary/middle school. Guido A. Binda of Battle Creek was the architect of the high school. In 1977, Binda set up a trust fund to annually award a Summerfield graduate a scholarship.

The previous high school is described in the 1961 yearbook: The school housed all grades in the district. The high school wing was built in 1954, an addition to the original 1880 four-room school. Additions were also built in 1936 (including a gymnasium by the Works Progress Administration), 1948 and 1958.

== Schools ==
Schools in Summerfield School District
School	Address	Notes
Summerfield Junior/Senior High School	17555 Ida West Road, Petersburg	Grades 7–12
Summerfield Elementary	232 East Elm Street, Petersburg	Grades PreK-6
