= Ida Public Schools =

School district in Michigan

Address
- 3145 Prairie Street Ida, Monroe County, Michigan, 48140; United States
- Coordinates: 41°54′23″N 83°34′11″W

District information
- Type: Public
- Motto: Where Learning Strikes
- Grades: Pre-Kindergarten-12
- Superintendent: David Eack
- Schools: 3
- Budget: $19,486,000 2022-2023 expenditures
- NCES District ID: 2619050

Students and staff
- Students: 1,410 (2024-2025)
- Teachers: 82.1 (on an FTE basis) (2024-2025)
- Staff: 175.62 FTE (2024-2025)
- Student–teacher ratio: 17.17 (2024-2025)
- Athletic conference: Lenawee County Athletic Association
- District mascot: Bluestreaks
- Colors: Blue & Yellow

Other information
- Website: www.idaschools.org

Ida Public Schools is a public school district in Monroe County, Michigan. It serves Ida and parts of the townships of Dundee, Ida, La Salle, Monroe, Raisinville.

== History ==
Ida's public school district was established in 1872. A two-room, two-story brick school was built that year on the site of the current school campus, but by 1904 its bricks had deteriorated and the building was unsafe. A ten-room school was built on the site in 1906, which included a high school. A 2-room elementary school was built in 1940, now a section of Ida Middle School.

Nine independent outlying school districts, each with a rural schoolhouse, consolidated with Ida's district in 1946. The Agricultural Building, currently located between the high school and middle school, was built in 1950. Ida Elementary opened in the growing district in 1952 to house grades kindergarten to six. A new Ida High School was built in 1955 and currently forms part of Ida Middle School. The current high school was built around 1966, and the 1906 school building was then demolished. Warren Holmes Company was the architect.

The original bell from the 1872 schoolhouse was recovered by the Class of 1969 and installed at Hemelgarn Field, the district's football stadium, to celebrate victories.

== Schools ==
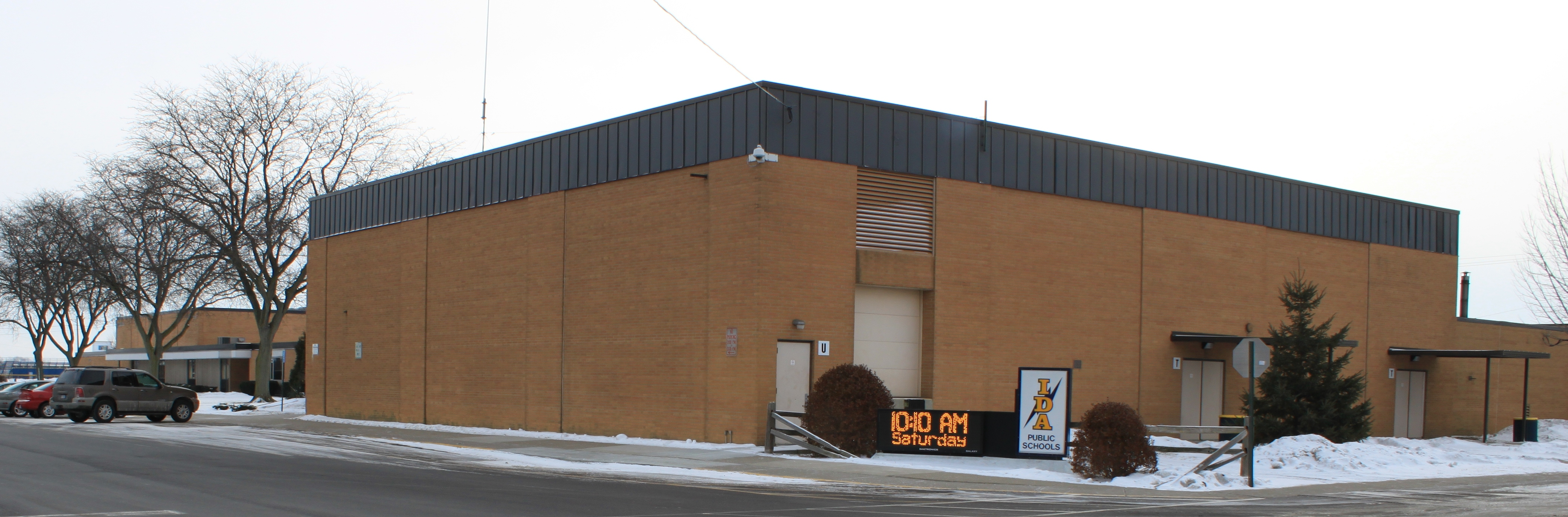
Ida High School

Ida Public Schools consists of three schools that share a campus in the village of Ida.

Schools in Ida Public Schools district
School	Address	Notes
Ida Elementary School	7900 Ida Street, Ida	Grades PreK-4
Ida Middle School	3143 Prairie Street, Ida	Grades 5–8
Ida High School	3145 Prairie Street, Ida	Grades 9–12

== Notabile Alumni ==
Stephen Herbert Langdon, scholar of Assyriology.
