= Ida, Michigan =

- Census-designated place (CDP) & unincorporated community
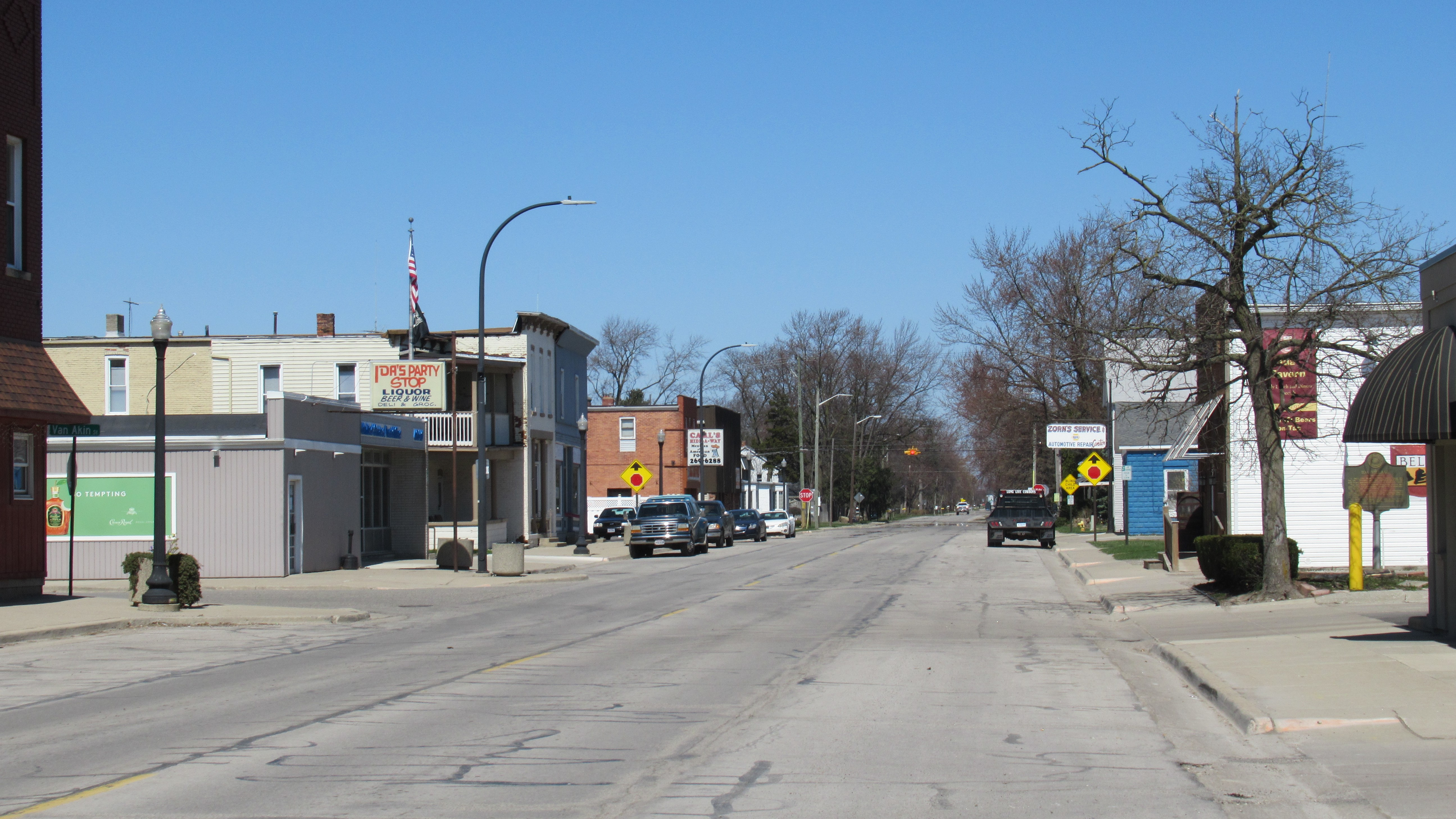
- Looking north along Lewis Avenue

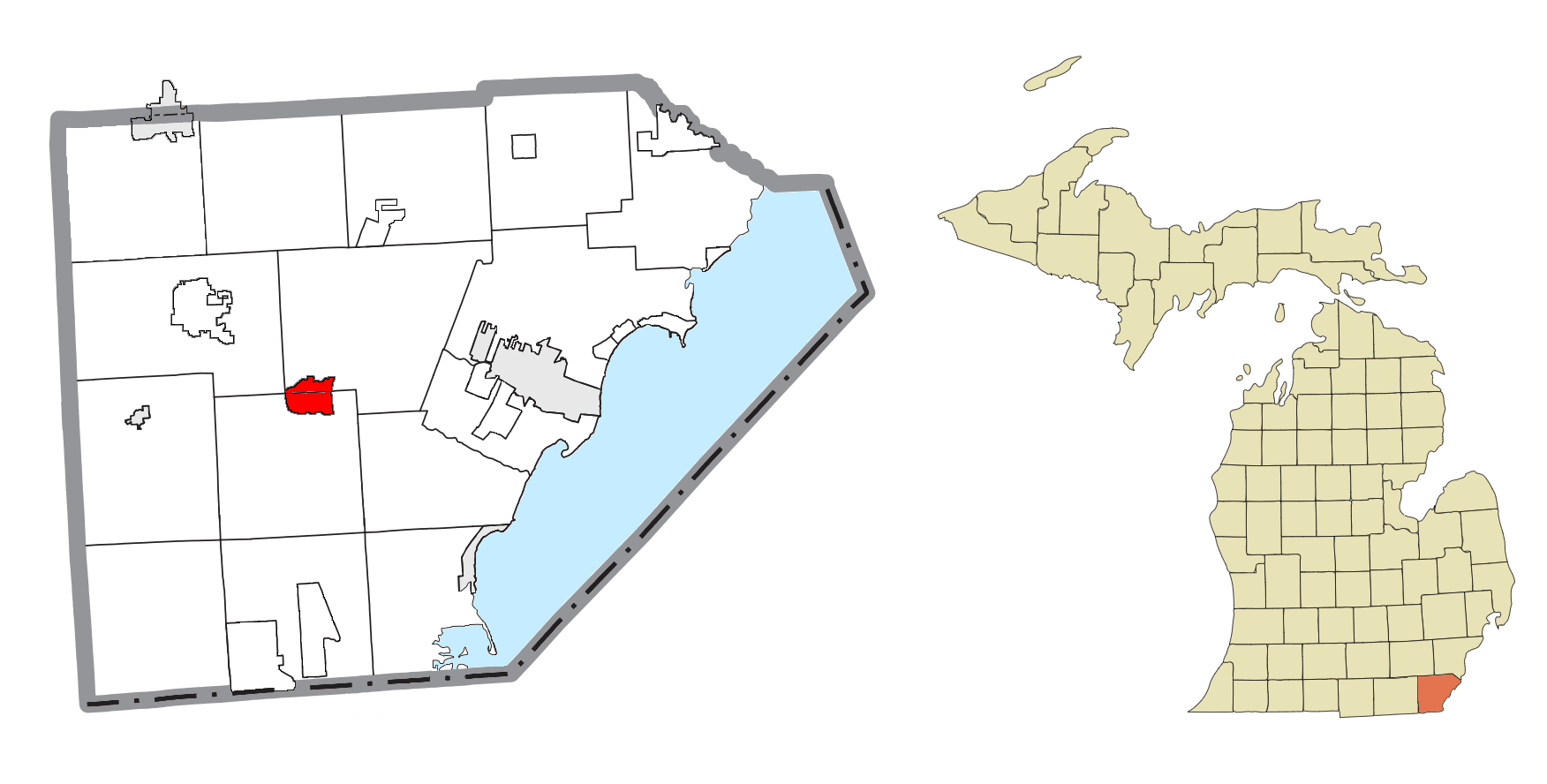
- Location within Monroe County

- Location within the state of Michigan Location within the United States
- Coordinates: 41°54′39″N 83°34′25″W
- Country: United States
- State: Michigan
- County: Monroe
- Townships: Ida and Raisinville
- Settled: 1825
- Established: 1844
- Platted: 1868

Area
  - Total: 2.50 sq mi (6.47 km^{2})
  - Land: 2.47 sq mi (6.40 km^{2})
  - Water: 0.031 sq mi (0.08 km^{2})
- Elevation: 640 ft (200 m)

Population (2020)
  - Total: 790
  - Density: 319.7/sq mi (123.45/km^{2})
- Time zone: UTC-5 (Eastern (EST))
  - Summer (DST): UTC-4 (EDT)
- ZIP code(s): 48140
- Area code: 734
- GNIS feature ID: 628919

Ida is an unincorporated community and census-designated place (CDP) in Monroe County in the U.S. state of Michigan. The CDP had a population of 790 at the 2020 census. The community is mostly within Ida Township with a smaller portion extending north into Raisinville Township.

As an unincorporated community, Ida has no legal autonomy of its own but does have its own post office with the 48140 ZIP Code.

== Geography ==
According to the U.S. Census Bureau, the CDP has a total area of 2.50 square miles (6.47 km^{2}), of which 2.47 square miles (6.40 km^{2}) is land and 0.03 square miles (0.08 km^{2}) is water.

The rural community of Ida is located in central Monroe County about 12 miles (19 km) north of the Ohio state line. The community is centered along Lewis Avenue within Ida Township with some development extending north of Ida East and Ida West Road into Raisinville Township. The community is located about 10 miles (16 km) west of the city of Monroe and sits at an elevation of 640 feet (200 m) above sea level. Ida is located about 4.0 miles (6.4 km) east of U.S. Route 23 and is accessible via exit 13 (Ida West Road). M-50 (South Custer Road) runs about 2.5 miles (4.0 km) to the north. Other nearby communities include the village of Dundee to the northwest, the city of Petersburg to the west, and the unincorporated communities of Lulu to the southwest and La Salle to the southeast.

Ida contains its own post office that uses the 48140 ZIP Code. The post office is located at 2888 Lewis Avenue in the center of the community. The ZIP Code serves most of Ida Township and a small western portion of La Salle Township, as well as a very small southwestern portion of Raisinville Township and the southeastern corner of Dundee Township.

The community is served by Ida Public Schools, which contains three schools–elementary, middle, and high school–on one main campus just east of Lewis Avenue. The district serves a much larger area extending beyond the community. The Ida Township Municipal Office is located in the community center at 3016 Lewis Avenue. The building also contains the Ida Branch Library of the Monroe County Library System.

== History ==
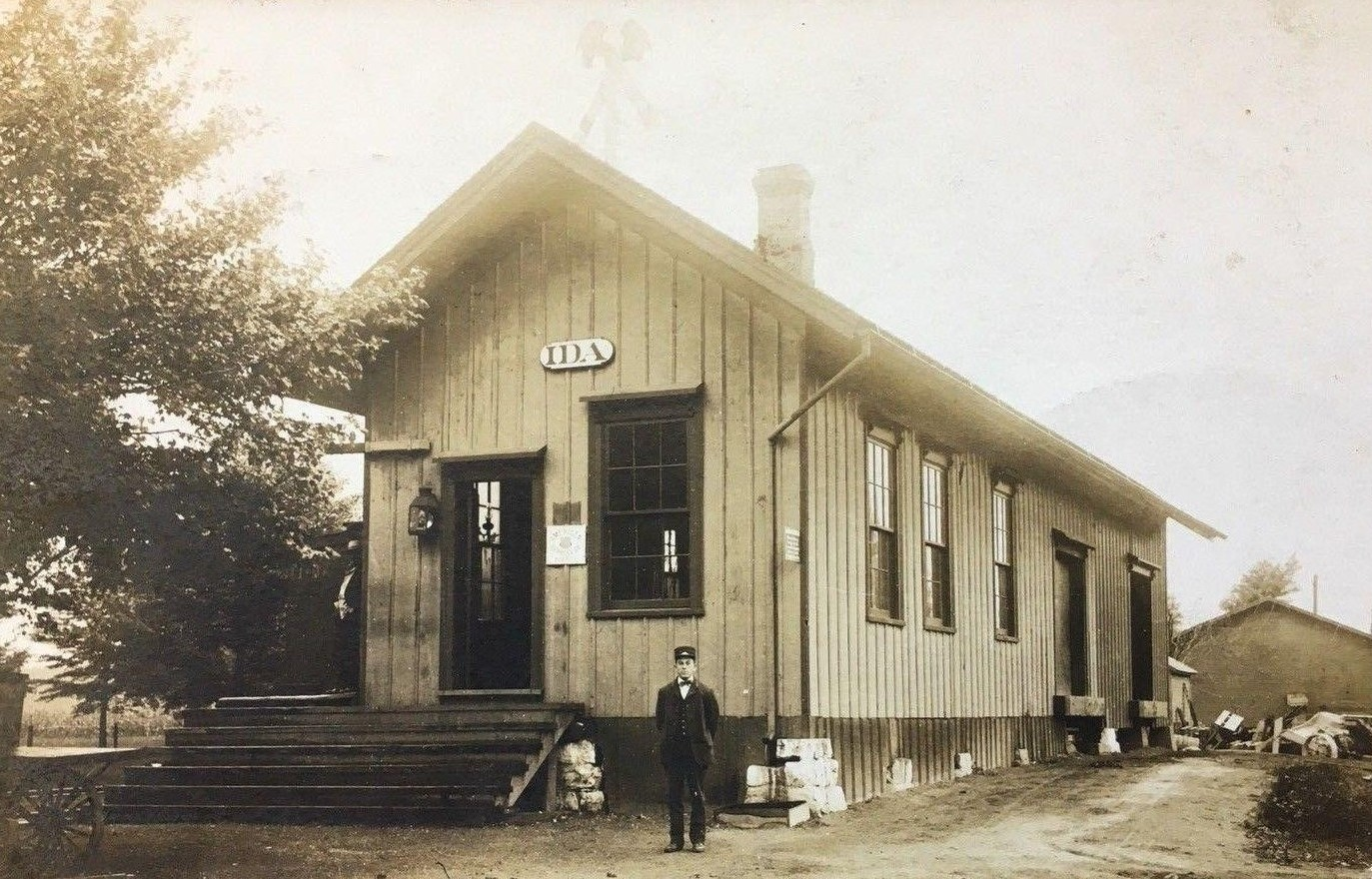
Ida train depot in 1907

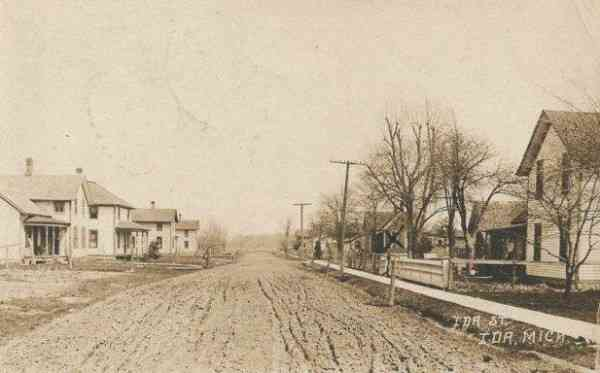
Main Street in 1913

Originally, the area served as a stagecoach stopover for travelers from Monroe to Adrian in the early 1800s. In 1825, the Wayside Inn opened as the first business in the area to serve travelers along the treacherous roadway that consisted of very poor Indian trails. All of the first settlers in the area were farmers, who even earned extra money by helping travelers who became stuck in the muddy trails. The Michigan Southern Railroad first constructed railway lines through the area by 1839, which led to the growth of the community. The area also became a very popular deer hunting destination for early settlers.

Ida Township itself was established in 1837 and named for local civil leader Ida M. Taylor. The community of Ida was formally established with a post office on July 11, 1844 with William Riggs serving as the first postmaster. The post office closed briefly on July 29, 1852 but was soon reestablished on June 11, 1853. The community of Ida was officially platted in 1868.

The Michigan Southern Railroad line was one of the first railways in the state, and Ida would receive a train depot along the route that eventually became part of the Lake Shore and Michigan Southern Railway. The depot was located along Lewis Avenue near the fire station and was incorporated as part of the New York Central Railroad before the train depot closed in 1959. The railway line was disestablished and removed entirely. Ida no longer has a railway through the community. Ida organized its own fire department in 1938 after a series of local fire concerns. In 1951, the department moved to its current location at 3016 Lewis Avenue and continues to serve the township as a part-time staffed and volunteer fire department. One of the more notable structures within the community is the St. Joseph Church. It is part of the St. Gabriel Parish, which is as old as the community itself. The nearby St. Joseph Cemetery has its oldest gravesite dating back to 1841. The current church building was constructed in 1904.

For the 2020 census, Ida was included as a newly-listed census-designated place, which is included for statistical purposes only. Ida continues to remain an unincorporated community with no legal autonomy of its own.

== Demographics ==
Historical population
Census	Pop.	Note	%±
2020	790		—
U.S. Decennial Census

According to the 2020 census there were 244 households in the CDP.

== Images ==
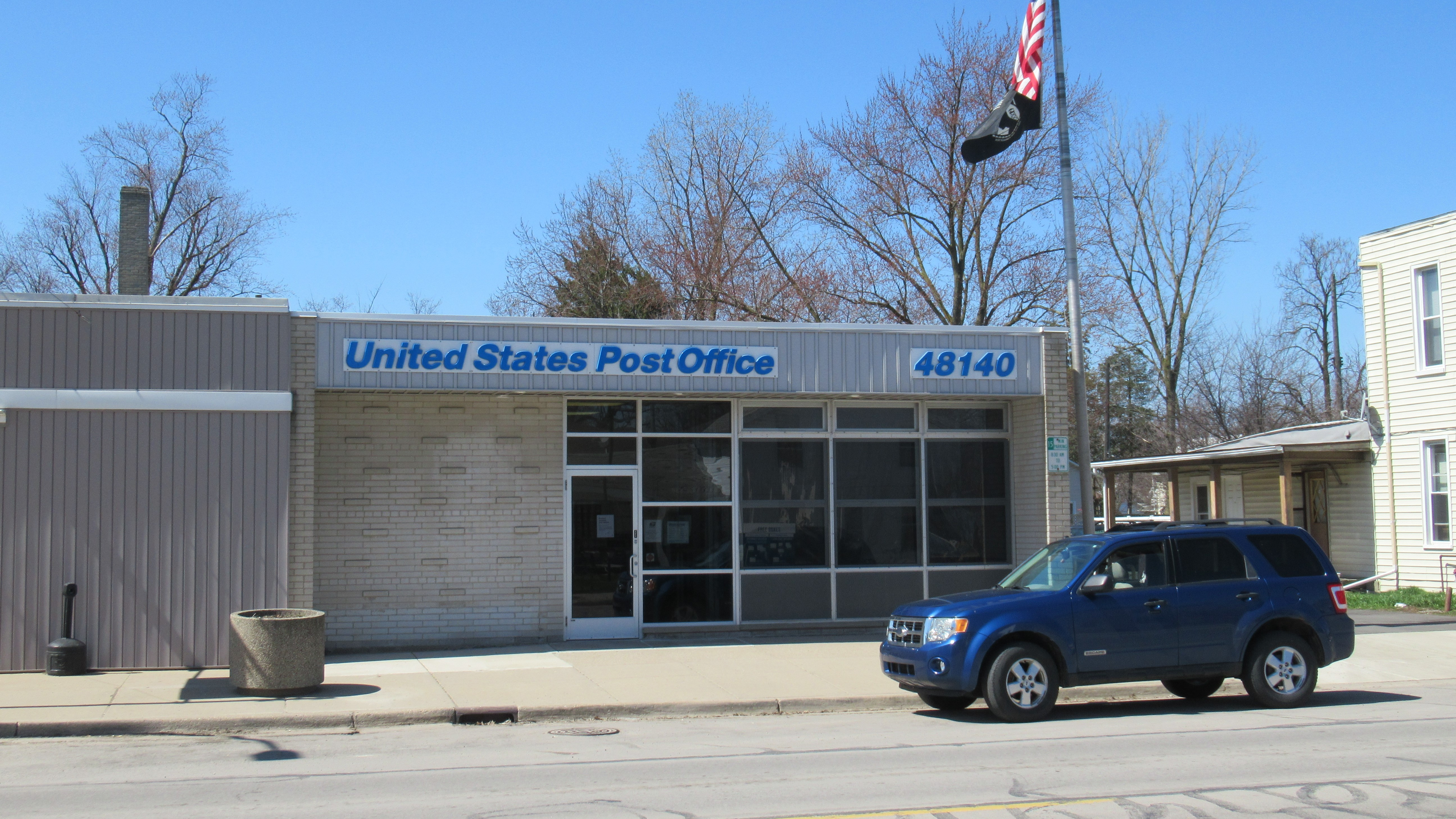
U.S. Post Office in Ida

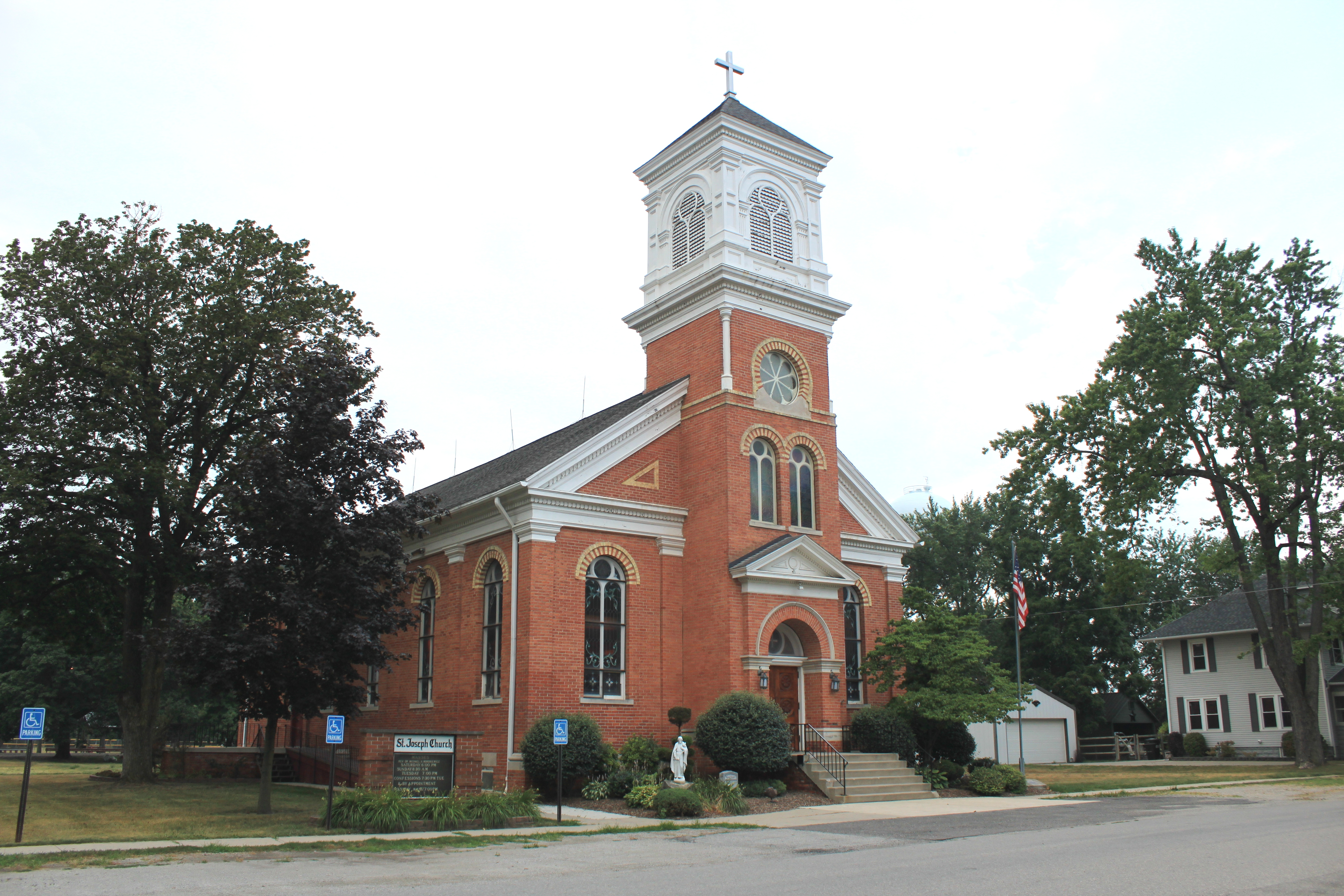
Saint Joseph Catholic Church

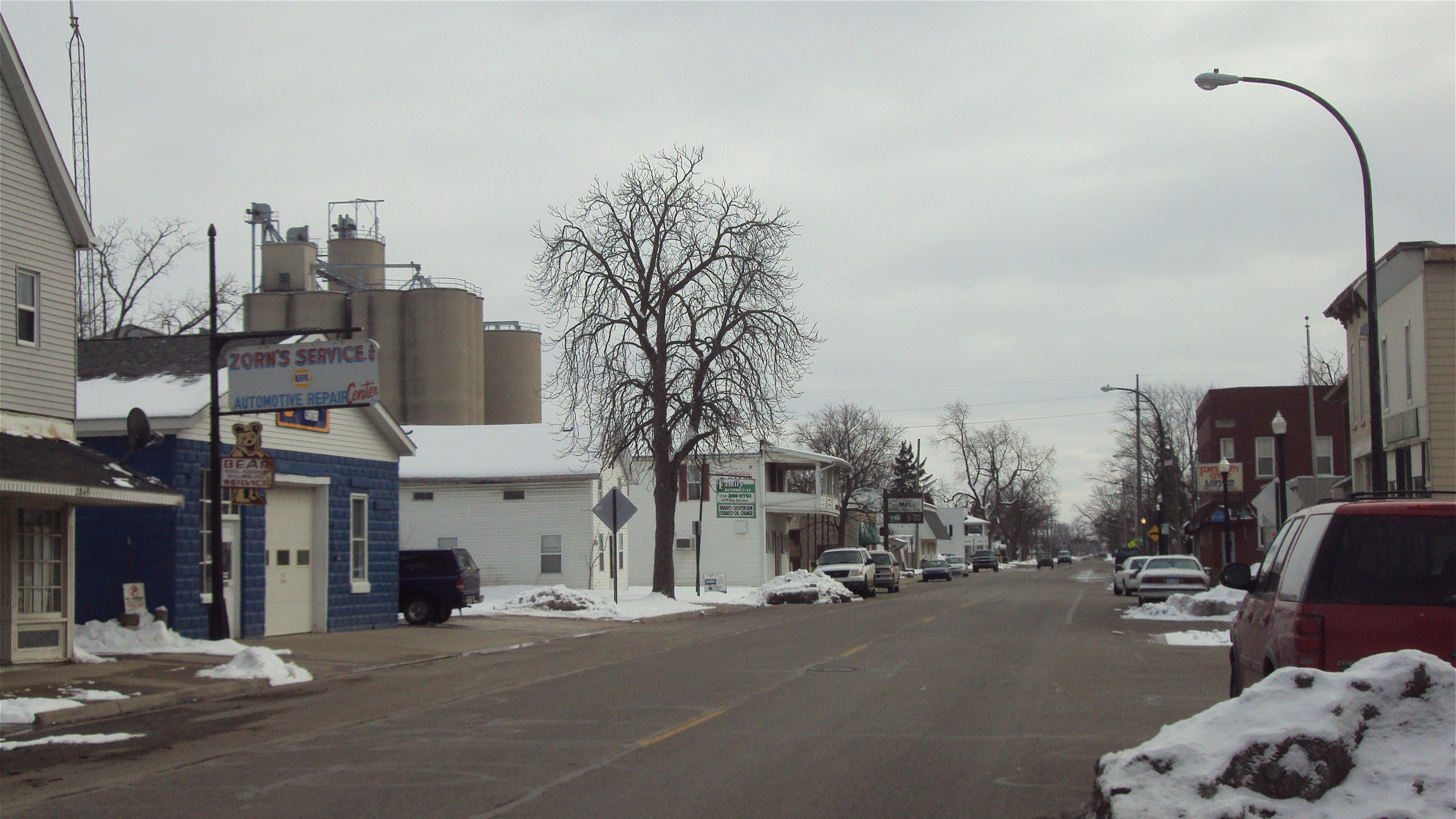
Southbound Lewis Avenue in 2010
