= Old Mill Museum (Dundee, Michigan) =

- U.S. Historic district – Contributing property
- Michigan State Historic Site
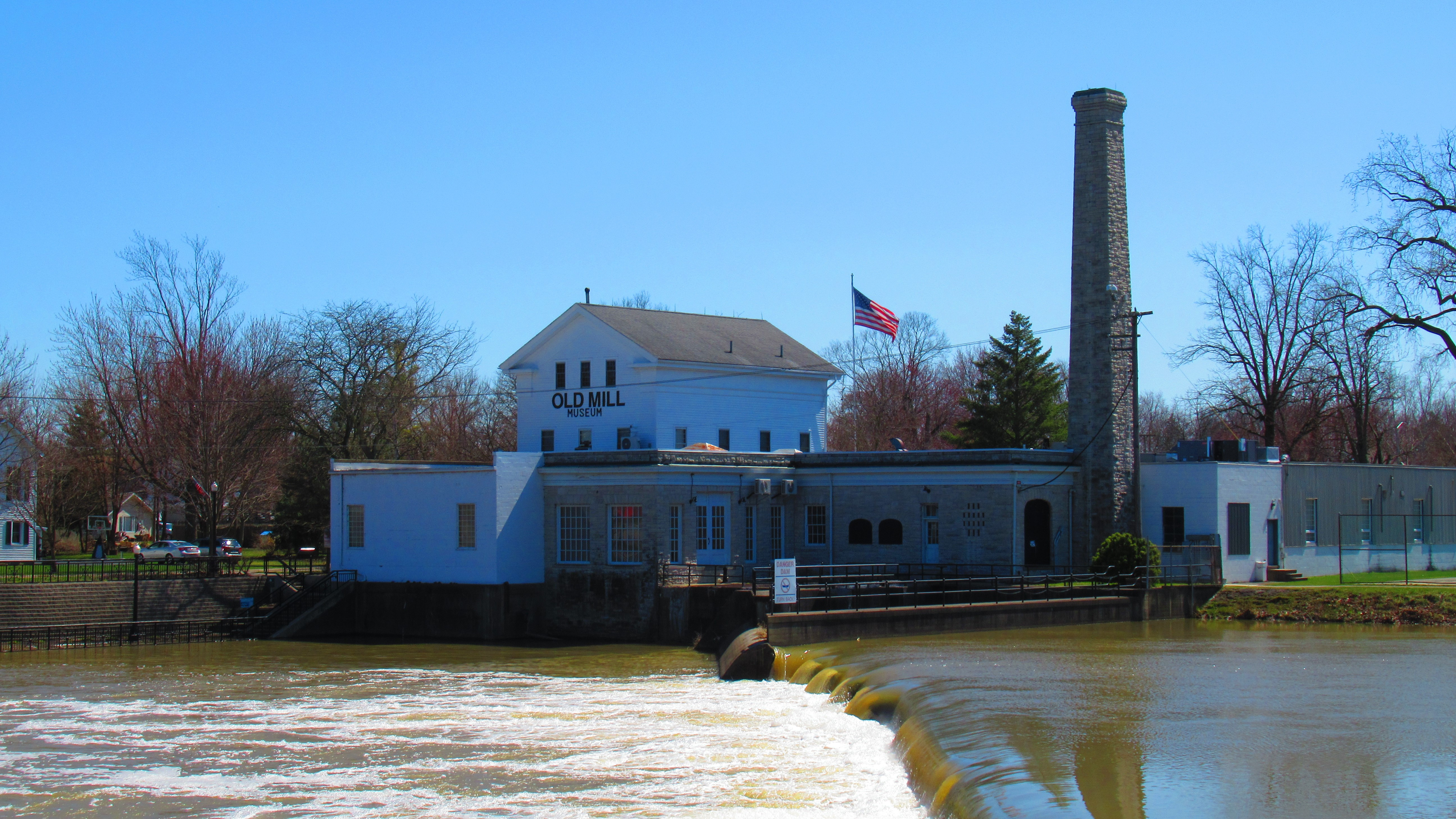

- Location within Michigan Location within the United States
- Interactive map
- Location: 242 Toledo Street; Dundee, Michigan
- Coordinates: 41°57′19″N 83°39′33″W
- Built: 1849
- Part of: Dundee Historic District (ID90001239)

Significant dates
- Designated CP: August 20, 1990
- Designated MSHS: August 3, 1979

The Old Mill Museum, also known as the Alfred Wilkerson Grist Mill, is a historic structure located along the River Raisin at 242 Toledo Street in Dundee, Michigan. It was designated as a Michigan Historic Site on August 3, 1979. It was later listed as a contributing property within the Dundee Historic District, which was added to the National Register of Historic Places on August 20, 1990.

Referred to as the oldest and most notable landmark in Dundee, it is the Dundee Historic District's only inclusion (along with the surrounding park) on the opposite of the river from the rest of the downtown area. While the facility itself was not built until the 1849, the dam upon which it is located was first constructed in 1827 and rebuilt in 1846. It is the largest of several dams located along the River Raisin — the majority of which are in nearby Monroe.

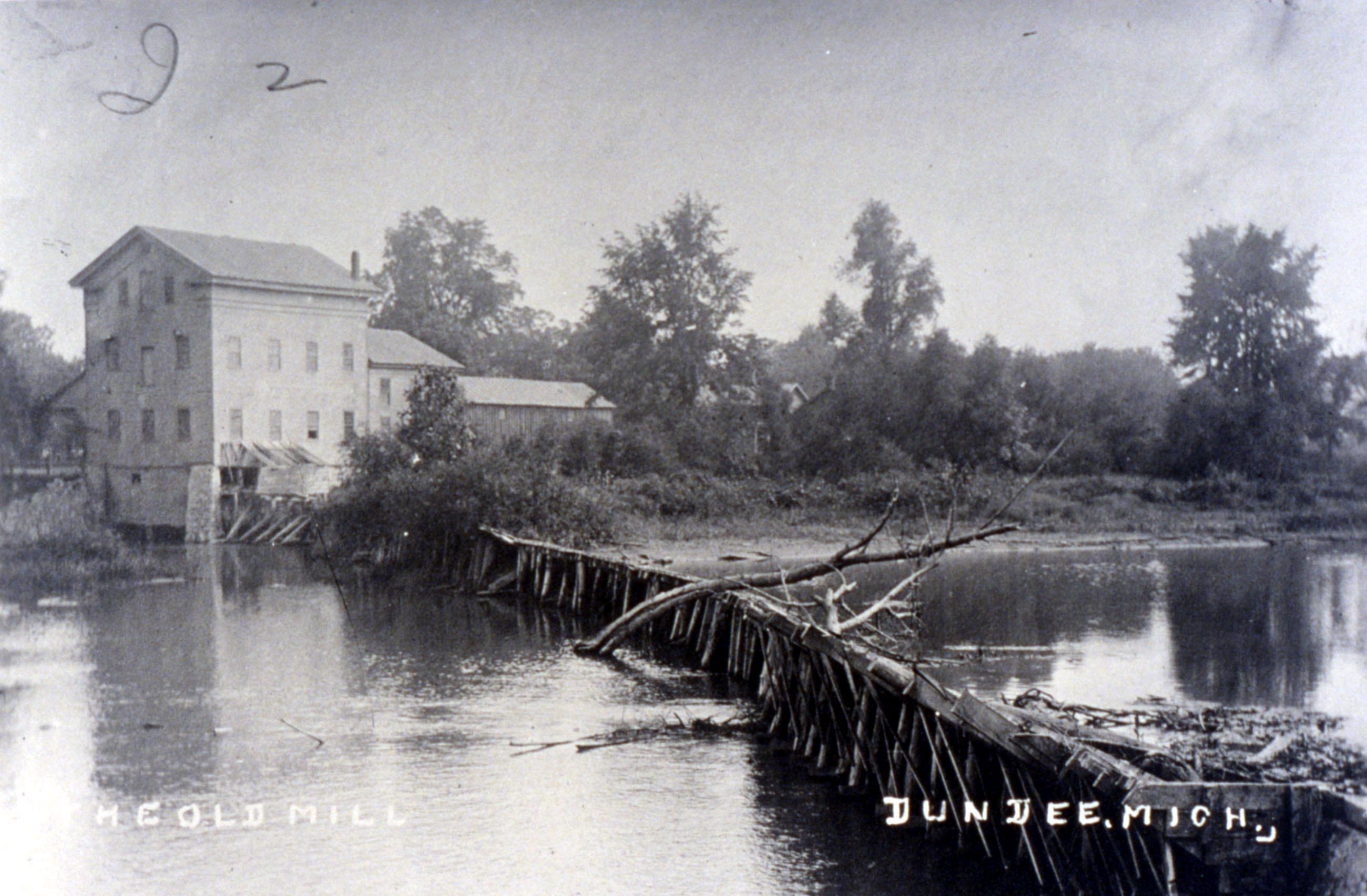
A much older image of the building and the dam (date unknown)

The facility first served as a gristmill for the growing milling industry in Dundee. Later, the building was converted to produce hydroelectricity as the village's only source of power around 1910. As the oldest surviving structure in Dundee, it was almost demolished in 1934 after years of disuse. Automotive magnate Henry Ford purchased the building and restored it at great cost as part of his village industries program. His only addition to the original three-story structure was the addition of a single-story structure on the side of the building. He converted the mill into a small factory to produce welding tips for his industry, and he was known to make many visits to Dundee. His interest in Dundee was an experiment to see if small towns could be used for his massive, global industry. After Ford's death in 1947, support for this small factory diminished, and it was sold in 1954 to the Wolverine Manufacturing Company, where the building was converted once more to produce paper products. The Wolverine Manufacturing Company used the facility until 1970, when they sold it to the village of Dundee for $1. The village revamped the structure and its surrounding 13.8 acres (5.6 ha) for public use as a museum and park. Although the property is praised for its historical nature, it is not listed on the National Register of Historic Places in its own right.

The museum offers ghosts tours and paranormal investigations. The Old Mill Museum is also the location of the annual Old Mill ParaFest.
