= Dundee Township, Michigan =

- Civil township
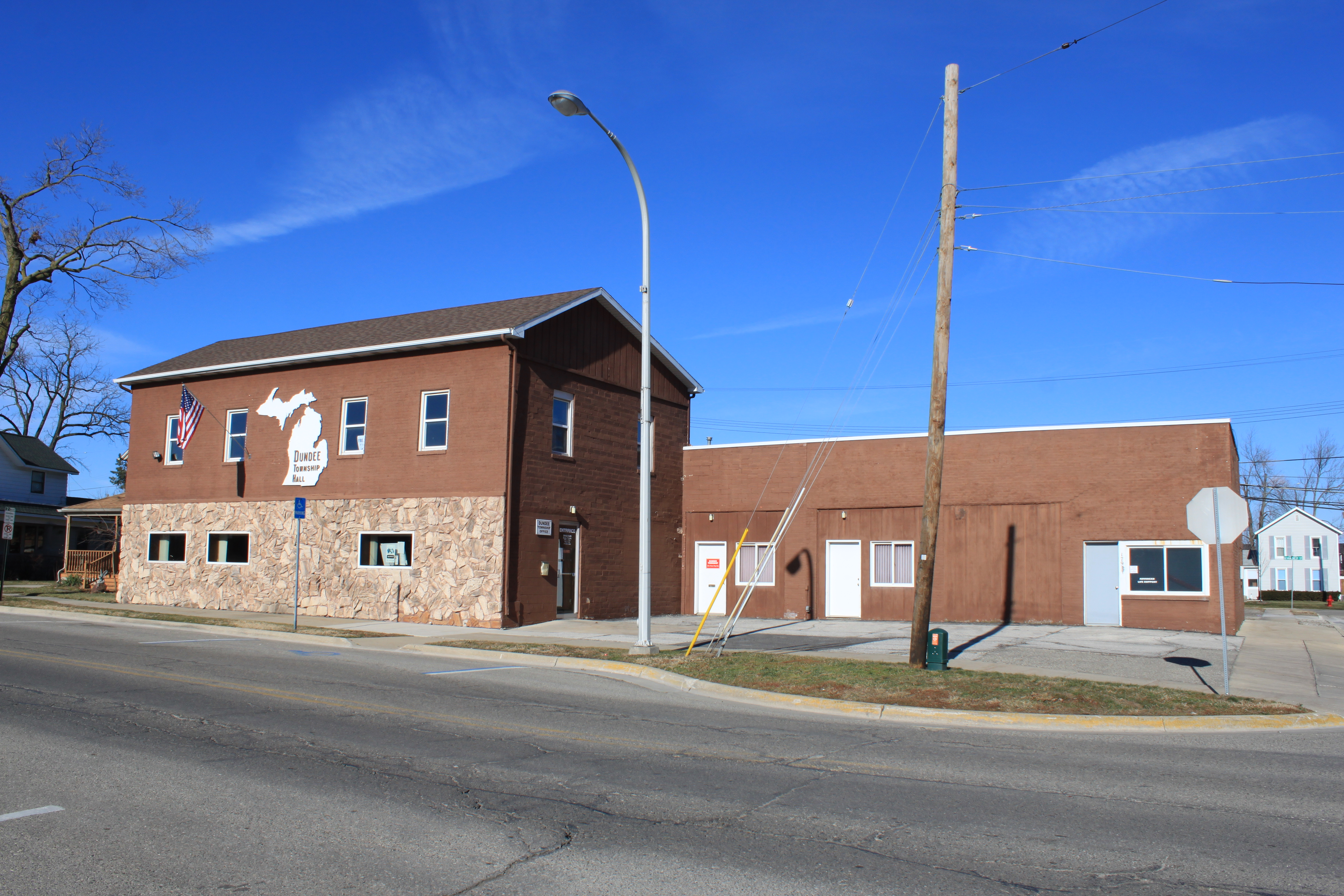
- Dundee Township Hall in the village of Dundee

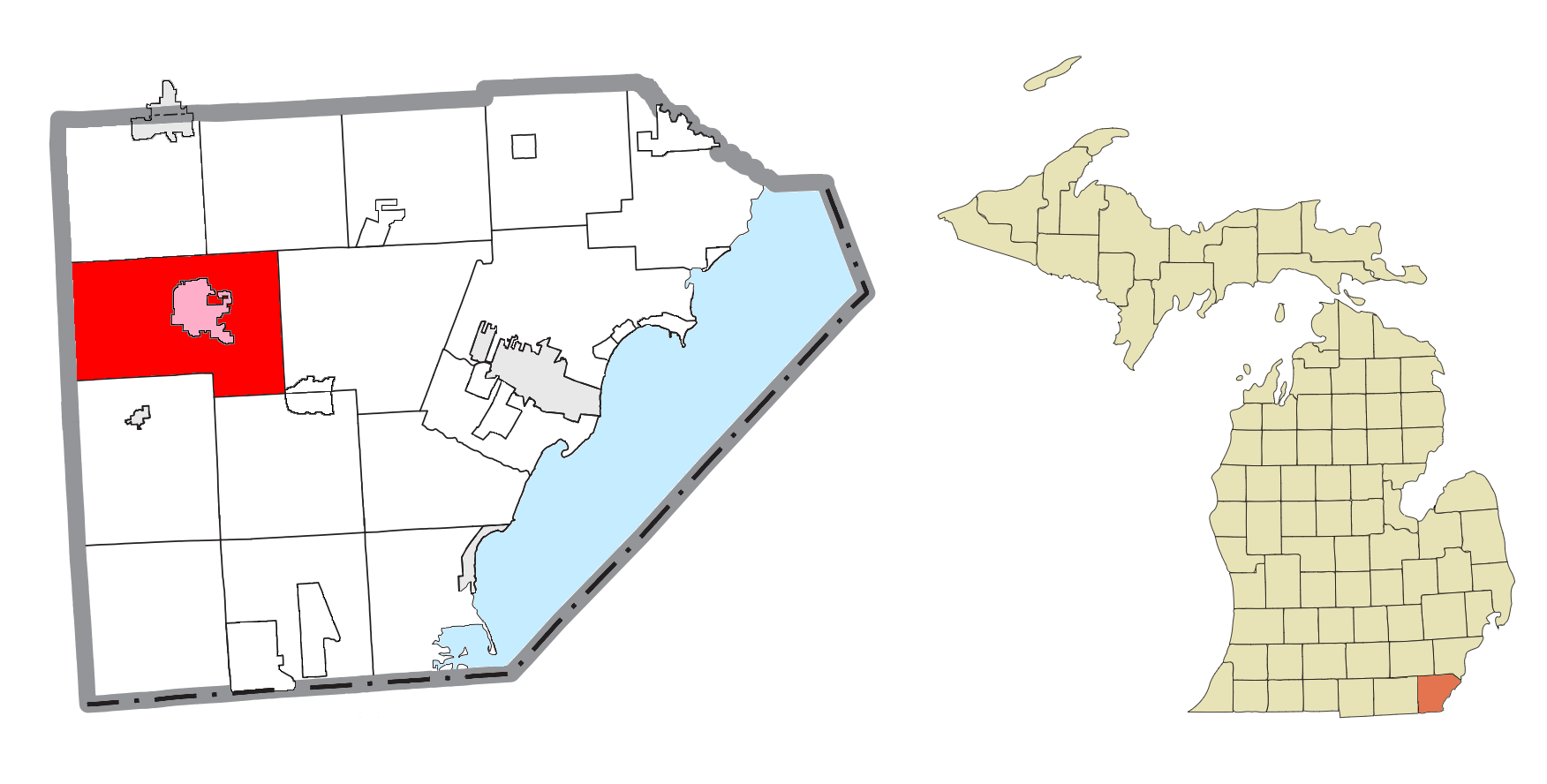
- Left: Location within Monroe County (red) and the administered village of Dundee (pink); Right: Location within the state of Michigan

- Location within Michigan Location within the United States
- Coordinates: 41°57′36″N 83°40′27″W
- Country: United States
- State: Michigan
- County: Monroe
- Established: 1838

Government
  - Supervisor: Joanna Uhl
  - Clerk: Janet Salenbien

Area
  - Total: 48.60 sq mi (125.9 km^{2})
  - Land: 48.22 sq mi (124.9 km^{2})
  - Water: 0.38 sq mi (0.98 km^{2})
- Elevation: 666 ft (203 m)

Population (2020)
  - Total: 8,145
  - Density: 168.9/sq mi (65.2/km^{2})
- Time zone: UTC-5 (Eastern (EST))
  - Summer (DST): UTC-4 (EDT)
- ZIP Codes: 48131 (Dundee); 48140 (Ida); 49229 (Britton); 49238 (Deerfield); 49270 (Petersburg)
- Area code: 734
- FIPS code: 26-115-23400
- GNIS feature ID: 1626196
- Website: www.dundeetownship.info

Dundee Township is a civil township of Monroe County in the U.S. state of Michigan. The population was 8,145 at the 2020 census, up from 6,759 in 2010. The township contains the village of Dundee, and the majority of the township is served by Dundee Community Schools.

== Communities ==
- Diann is the location of a junction between the Ann Arbor Railroad running north–south, the Indiana and Ohio Railway coming in from the west, and the CN Flat Rock Subdivision coming in from the east at 41°55′55″N 83°38′14″W about 3 miles (5 km) southeast of Dundee.
- Dundee is a village within the township on the River Raisin at the junction of U.S. Route 23 and M-50.
- Rea is an unincorporated community located at 41°58′31″N 83°43′18″W. It was founded in 1886 as a railway station. Rea had its own post office from March 2, 1886, until October 2, 1906.

== Geography ==
Dundee Township is in western Monroe County and is bordered to the west by Lenawee County. The village of Dundee is in the center of the township, 14 miles (23 km) west of Monroe, the county seat. The River Raisin flows from south to east across the township, passing through the center of Dundee village. The township is within the River Raisin watershed except for the southeast corner, which is drained by tributaries of Plum Creek. The River Raisin and Plum Creek are direct tributaries of Lake Erie to the southeast.

According to the U.S. Census Bureau, the township has a total area of 48.60 square miles (125.87 km^{2}), of which 48.22 square miles (124.89 km^{2}) are land and 0.38 square miles (0.98 km^{2}), or 0.79%, are water.

== Demographics ==
Historical population
Census	Pop.	Note	%±
1850	1,239		—
1860	1,940		56.6%
1870	2,384		22.9%
1880	3,242		36.0%
1890	3,539		9.2%
1900	3,061		−13.5%
1910	2,942		−3.9%
1920	2,801		−4.8%
1930	2,955		5.5%
1940	3,489		18.1%
1950	3,838		10.0%
1960	4,511		17.5%
1970	4,911		8.9%
1980	5,395		9.9%
1990	5,376		−0.4%
2000	6,341		18.0%
2010	6,759		6.6%
2020	8,145		20.5%
U.S. Decennial Census

As of the census of 2000, there were 6,341 people, 2,367 households, and 1,713 families residing in the township. The population density was 130.9 inhabitants per square mile (50.5/km^{2}). There were 2,498 housing units at an average density of 51.6 per square mile (19.9/km^{2}). The racial makeup of the township was 97.35% White, 0.49% African American, 0.22% Native American, 0.35% Asian, 0.43% from other races, and 1.17% from two or more races. Hispanic or Latino of any race were 1.25% of the population. There were 2,367 households, out of which 36.4% had children under the age of 18 living with them, 56.7% were married couples living together, 10.7% had a female householder with no husband present, and 27.6% were non-families. 22.8% of all households were made up of individuals, and 8.7% had someone living alone who was 65 years of age or older. The average household size was 2.67 and the average family size was 3.13.

In the township the population was spread out, with 28.2% under the age of 18, 9.4% from 18 to 24, 30.3% from 25 to 44, 22.5% from 45 to 64, and 9.6% who were 65 years of age or older. The median age was 34 years. For every 100 females, there were 100.1 males. For every 100 females age 18 and over, there were 95.7 males.

The median income for a household in the township was $47,279, and the median income for a family was $57,996. Males had a median income of $44,250 versus $26,580 for females. The per capita income for the township was $20,361. About 5.6% of families and 7.7% of the population were below the poverty line, including 8.8% of those under age 18 and 5.6% of those age 65 or over.

== Highways ==
- US 23
- M-50
