= Eaton Rapids, Michigan =

City in Michigan, United States

Eaton Rapids
- City
- Nickname: The Island City
- Location of Eaton Rapids, Michigan
- Coordinates: 42°30′33″N 84°39′12″W
- Country: United States
- State: Michigan
- County: Eaton

Area
  - Total: 3.73 sq mi (9.67 km^{2})
  - Land: 3.63 sq mi (9.40 km^{2})
  - Water: 0.10 sq mi (0.27 km^{2})
- Elevation: 876 ft (267 m)

Population (2020)
  - Total: 5,203
  - Density: 1,433.4/sq mi (553.42/km^{2})
- Time zone: UTC-5 (Eastern (EST))
  - Summer (DST): UTC-4 (EDT)
- ZIP Code: 48827
- Area code: 517
- FIPS code: 26-24540
- GNIS feature ID: 1626211
- Website: https://www.cityofeatonrapids.gov/

Eaton Rapids is a city in Eaton County in the U.S. state of Michigan. The population was 5,203 at the 2020 census.

The city is located in the south of Eaton Rapids Township, on the boundary with Hamlin Township, though it is politically independent of both townships. Its nickname is the Island City, since the downtown is located on an island, with a public park, in the Grand River.

== History ==
The Potawatomi people established a village in the area of what is now Eaton Rapids in about 1774. This was part of their wide territory in historic times.

The area constituting Eaton Rapids was first settled by Euro-Americans around the year 1835, who were drawn there because of the timber and water power in the area. It became a center of industry. The following year, a sawmill was constructed near Spring Brook in Spicerville; it provided the lumber settlers used to build Eaton Rapids. In 1837, the Old Red Mill was constructed by the mill company; it used waterpower from the stream to grind corn. The mill company later used wood from Spicerville to construct their own sawmill along the Grand River, as well as a wool carding mill.

=== Mineral Water Boom of the Nineteenth Century ===
Eaton Rapids became an island city after a canal, or "race", had been dug in the 1840s channeling water from the Grand River to Spring Brook. While this provided greater water power for the mills located on Spring Brook just before it united with the Grand River, it also caused some concern about the quality of drinking water from regular, shallow wells. Morgan Vaughan, a prominent Eaton Rapids resident writing in 1870, described the situation:

    "A dam was erected and a deep race excavated to throw the available waters of the river into the creek, from which they could be the more easily trained to motive power. But that which promised so well at first, proved the bane of the town's prosperity. The digging of the race and raising the streams on two sides of the town plat, had the effect to so saturate the triangular piece of land within it, that nothing but surface water could be obtained from the shallow wells, and a state of dearth and unhealthiness prevailed, by no means desirable."[8]

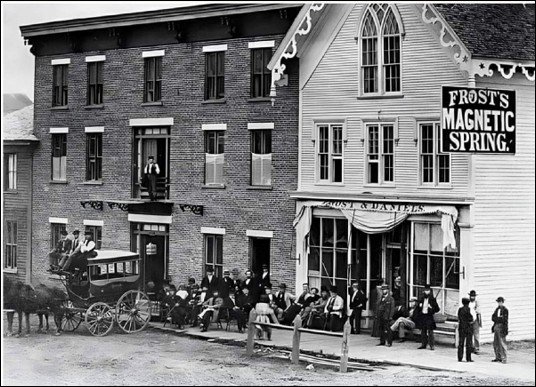
Frost House (c. 1870-1880)

Enos Beebe Frost, (E.B. Frost), built a hotel called the Frost House on the north side of his dry goods store located on the corner of Main and Knight streets, and he needed a convenient source of drinking water for his guests. Frost sunk a well near the curb to the south of the hotel, next to Knight Street, with the intention of creating an artesian well. Frost was the first named individual to dig, or sink, a deep artesian well in Michigan that produced the soon-to-be famous mineral waters. (Stiles Kennedy, writing in 1872, describes similar artesian mineral water discovered in St. Louis, Michigan, also in 1869, however, he attributes this discovery to the "St. Louis Salt Company".) This first artesian well, sunk next to the Frost House in Eaton Rapids, penetrated more than 160 feet through layers of rock, slate, clay, and coal to reach a water-filled crevice causing the water to overflow the well head.

Due to the immediate popularity with the locals of this mineral water, four additional wells (Shaw's Well, Mosher's Well, Bordine's Well, and Stirling's Well) were sunk in Eaton Rapids during the summer of 1869. Shaw's Well, sunk to a depth of 162 feet by Henry A. Shaw, was located on the northwest corner of Main and Knight streets, across from the Frost House, and later used by the Vaughan House. Mosher's Well was sunk by James Mosher near the existing hotel, the Eaton Rapids House, which was located on the southwest corner of Main and Hamlin streets. David Stirling sunk his well to a depth of 184 feet and soon converted his merchant business to a mineral water hotel, located on the east side of Main Street, south of Hamlin Street. Bordine's Well was sunk by S.W. Bordine on the northwest corner of Main and Hamlin streets and existing buildings were soon converted to the Central House hotel at that location.

The owners of these wells had samples of their newly-found mineral water analyzed to discover the mineral content. Samples of water were sent to Professor Robert C. Kedzie, professor of chemistry at the State Agricultural School in Lansing and to Professor Samuel P. Duffield, professor of chemistry at the Detroit Medical College. The mineral content of these new wells was shown to be similar to other mineral water believed at the time to be beneficial for the treatment of common ailments and diseases. In fact, in 1870 Morgan Vaughan reflects the Victorian belief in the health benefits of mineral water as "therapeutic agents" and wrote, "It will be noticed that for the treatment of rheumatism, paralysis, nervous debility and many other diseases, the class of mineral waters commended by Dr. Smith, are identical with those of these wells."

Excitement grew even more when locals began to report drill tools and other iron objects were somehow magnetized by being placed in the water or letting the water run over them. Various experiments were conducted on the new mineral water to test the apparent magnetism, and nearly all concluded the water either was magnetic, or could induce magnetism on iron objects. However, not all tests on the "magnetic water" were supportive of these claims. Professor Robert C. Kedzie not only analyzed the mineral content of the new artesian water in Michigan, but also tested the magnetism. His experiments concluded the apparent magnetism was simply a result of "the re-appearance of our old friend, terrestrial magnetism" and did not come from the water itself. Dr. Kedzie also concluded, "the water is not susceptible of magnetism, and cannot convey it." Despite this, claims of magnetic water continued and since magnetism was widely believed at the time to be an effective treatment for disease, the sick and diseased from across the country poured into Eaton Rapids turning it into a popular health resort within a year.

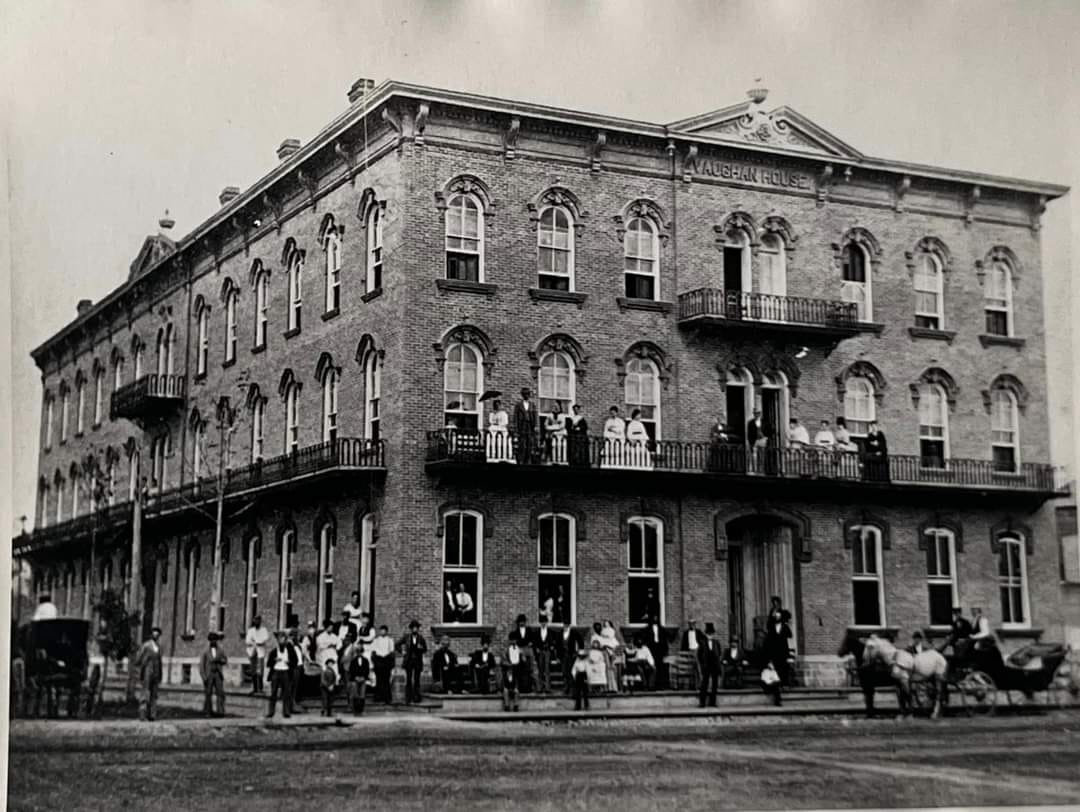
The Vaughan House (1872-1874)

As early as 1870, it became clear Eaton Rapids could benefit from larger, more luxurious, hotels. Local bankers and investors had seen how popular other converted hotels had become, such as the Frost House and Stirling's Magnetic Mineral Spring hotel. In addition to the hotels and boarding houses, local homeowners were also profiting from lodging visitors from out of town. Construction soon began on the Vaughan House, a large, three story brick structure with a basement, and iron balconies running around the outside of the second floor, with rooms to accommodate 250 guests on its own. The Vaughan House opened its doors in 1872 (some sources say 1871) and was soon recognized as the "Pride of Eaton Rapids". After serving its customers for barely two years, The Vaughan House burned down in 1874. That same year the Anderson House was built, another large hotel that catered to the wealthy. This hotel rivaled the former Vaughan House in elegance and luxury, and existed from 1874 to 1911, when it was also destroyed by fire.

In the following two decades, Eaton Rapids earned nation-wide fame and the nickname The Saratoga of the West, referring to Saratoga Springs, New York, which had tourism based on such waters. This water was in huge demand and resulted in many people coming to take mineral water baths and stay for extended periods in the mineral water hotels in the city. At least fourteen wells had been drilled in Eaton Rapids to supply water for the hotels and baths. At times, there were so many health tourists visiting Eaton Rapids, not only were the hotels filled to capacity with visitors, an equal number of people were also lodged in the homes of local residents.

=== Twentieth Century ===
In 1921, John B. Davidson Sr. came to Eaton Rapids from Philadelphia, Pennsylvania. He started the only textile mill in Michigan that spun its own yarn. The Davidson Mill supplied 95 percent of the wool yarn for major league baseball uniforms, as well as high-grade yarns for other applications. After 48 years in business, the mill burned in 1969. John B. Davidson became a politician, elected as mayor of Eaton Rapids, and later representing the area in both the State House and State Senate.

In 1927, Irving Jacob Reuter and his wife Janet built Medovue, a 17-room, 10,000-square foot, Tudor Revival- style mansion, where they lived for nine years. President of the Oldsmobile automobile company, Reuter was also a financier and inventor. The Reuters donated substantial sums to charity.

Their property was sold to the Roman Catholic Diocese of Lansing, and became the private residence of its first bishop, the Most Reverend Joseph H. Albers. The diocese later sold the mansion.

It was purchased by C.J. and Mille Sumner, who adapted it and reopened it to operate as an Adult Foster Care Home. They furnished it with antiques and named it "Ivy Manor". The home was sold again in 1990 and was renovated for use as a bed and breakfast, known as the English Inn. In 1991 it was recognized and listed in the state List of Registered Historic Places in Michigan. The original 10,000-square-foot (930-square-meter) building, complete with many of the original antique furnishings, has 15 acres (61,000 square meters) of gardens and pastoral countryside located on the river. It was purchased by Gary and Donna Nelson in 1996, who also developed a restaurant and pub on the property. It is open to the public for viewing. Their son Erik Nelson has taken over operations.

== Geography ==
Eaton Rapids is on the northward course of the Grand River as it flows from Jackson to Lansing. There it turns westward at its confluence with the Spring Brook. According to the United States Census Bureau, the city has a total area of 3.51 square miles (9.09 square kilometers), of which 3.39 square miles (8.78 km^{2}) is land and 0.12 square miles (0.31 km^{2}) is water.

=== Geographic features ===
- Grand River

=== Transportation ===
- M-99 connects with I-94, 19 miles (31 kilometers) to the south near Albion; and with I-96, 12 miles (19 km) north, just south of Lansing.
- M-50 connects with I-69, nine miles (14 km) west in Charlotte; and with US 127 and I-94, 21 miles (34 km) to the southeast just north of Jackson.
- M-188 provides access from Eaton Rapids to the Veterans of Foreign Wars (VFW) National Home near Onondaga.

== Demographics ==
Historical population
Census	Pop.	Note	%±
1860	581		—
1870	1,221		110.2%
1880	1,785		46.2%
1890	1,970		10.4%
1900	2,103		6.8%
1910	2,094		−0.4%
1920	2,379		13.6%
1930	2,822		18.6%
1940	3,060		8.4%
1950	3,509		14.7%
1960	4,052		15.5%
1970	4,494		10.9%
1980	4,510		0.4%
1990	4,695		4.1%
2000	5,330		13.5%
2010	5,214		−2.2%
2020	5,203		−0.2%
U.S. Decennial Census

=== 2020 census ===
As of the 2020 census, Eaton Rapids had a population of 5,203. The median age was 38.9 years. 23.8% of residents were under the age of 18 and 16.5% of residents were 65 years of age or older. For every 100 females there were 97.2 males, and for every 100 females age 18 and over there were 91.4 males age 18 and over.

96.5% of residents lived in urban areas, while 3.5% lived in rural areas.

There were 2,188 households in Eaton Rapids, of which 29.6% had children under the age of 18 living in them. Of all households, 39.4% were married-couple households, 19.9% were households with a male householder and no spouse or partner present, and 31.8% were households with a female householder and no spouse or partner present. About 32.9% of all households were made up of individuals and 14.0% had someone living alone who was 65 years of age or older.

There were 2,364 housing units, of which 7.4% were vacant. The homeowner vacancy rate was 1.3% and the rental vacancy rate was 8.4%.

Racial composition as of the 2020 census
Race	Number	Percent
White	4,677	89.9%
Black or African American	55	1.1%
American Indian and Alaska Native	12	0.2%
Asian	23	0.4%
Native Hawaiian and Other Pacific Islander	0	0.0%
Some other race	68	1.3%
Two or more races	368	7.1%
Hispanic or Latino (of any race)	273	5.2%

=== 2010 census ===
As of the census of 2010, there were 5,214 people, 2,092 households, and 1,345 families residing in the city. The population density was 1,538.1 inhabitants per square mile (593.9/km^{2}). There were 2,387 housing units at an average density of 704.1 per square mile (271.9/km^{2}). The racial makeup of the city was 95.1% White, 0.7% African American, 0.4% Native American, 0.5% Asian, 0.8% from other races, and 2.6% from two or more races. Hispanic or Latino of any race were 4.4% of the population.

There were 2,092 households, of which 36.9% had children under the age of 18 living with them, 42.1% were married couples living together, 15.3% had a female householder with no husband present, 6.8% had a male householder with no wife present, and 35.7% were non-families. Of all households, 30.0% were made up of individuals, and 11% had someone living alone who was 65 years of age or older. The average household size was 2.49 and the average family size was 3.09.

The median age in the city was 34.8 years. 27.7% of residents were under the age of 18; 9.3% were between the ages of 18 and 24; 26.7% were from 25 to 44; 25.2% were from 45 to 64; and 11.1% were 65 years of age or older. The gender makeup of the city was 48.3% male and 51.7% female.

=== 2000 census ===
As of the census of 2000, there were 5,330 people, 2,067 households, and 1,399 families residing in the city. The population density was 1,576.9 inhabitants per square mile (608.8/km^{2}). There were 2,168 housing units at an average density of 641.4 per square mile (247.6/km^{2}). The racial makeup of the city was 96.12% White, 0.38% African American, 0.45% Native American, 0.54% Asian, 1.01% from other races, and 1.50% from two or more races. Hispanic or Latino of any race were 2.93% of the population.

There were 2,067 households, out of which 39.7% had children under the age of 18 living with them, 47.8% were married couples living together, 13.9% had a female householder with no husband present, and 32.3% were non-families. Of all households 27.4% were made up of individuals, and 12.2% had someone living alone who was 65 years of age or older. The average household size was 2.57 and the average family size was 3.11.

In the city, the population was spread out, with 31.0% under the age of 18, 8.9% from 18 to 24, 30.7% from 25 to 44, 18.2% from 45 to 64, and 11.2% who were 65 years of age or older. The median age was 32 years. For every 100 females, there were 92.6 males. For every 100 females age 18 and over, there were 87.9 males.

The median income for a household in the city was $39,769, and the median income for a family was $48,239. Males had a median income of $37,582 versus $29,440 for females. The per capita income for the city was $18,446. About 3.2% of families and 5.9% of the population were below the poverty line, including 6.3% of those under age 18 and 2.1% of those age 65 or over.

== Climate ==
This climatic region is typified by large seasonal temperature differences, with warm to hot (and often humid) summers and cold (sometimes severely cold) winters. According to the Köppen Climate Classification system, Eaton Rapids has a humid continental climate, abbreviated "Dfb" on climate maps.
