= Dundee Historic District =

Historic district in Michigan, United States

- U.S. National Register of Historic Places
- U.S. Historic district
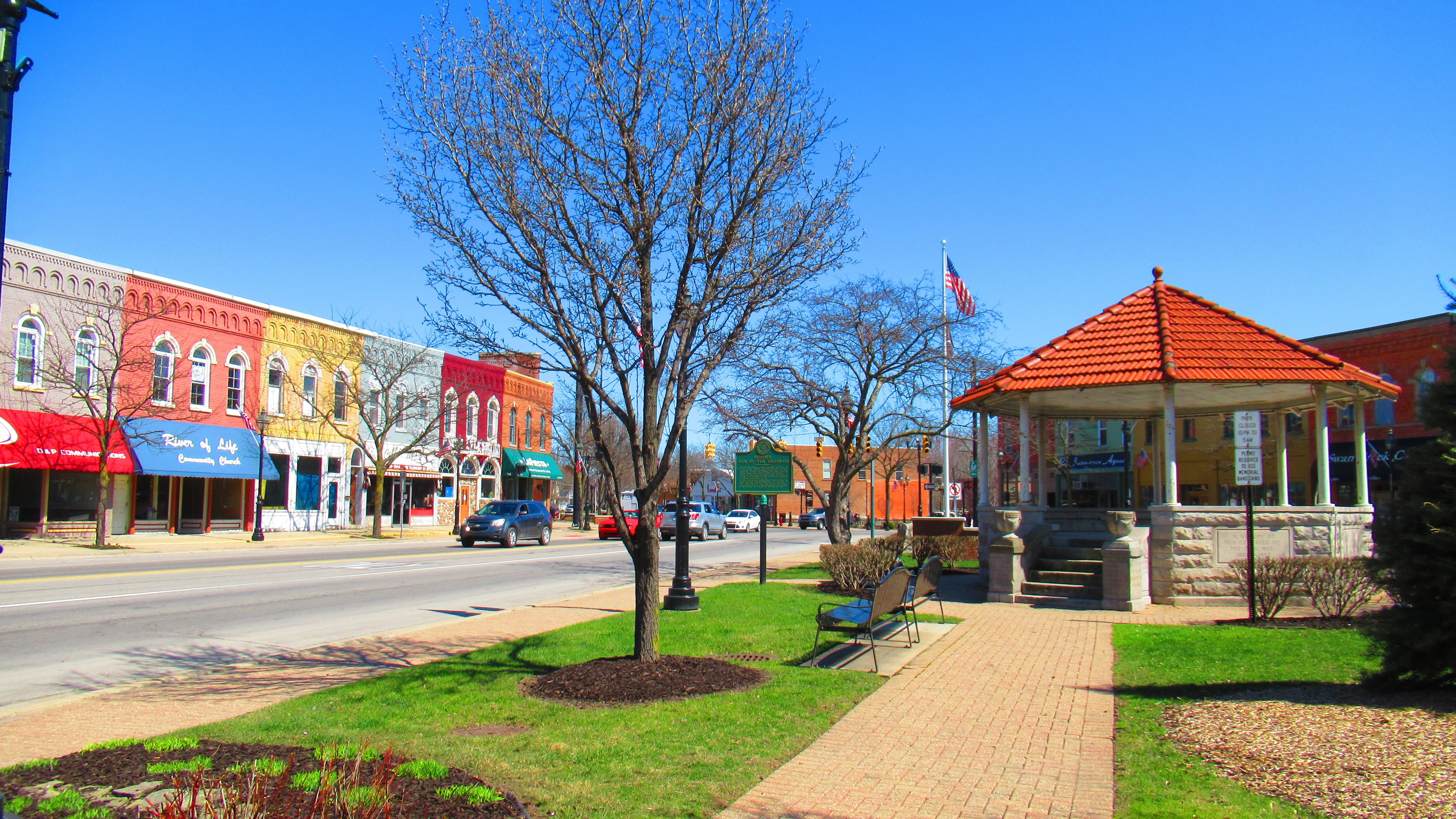
- The historic district along M-50

- Location within Michigan Location within the United States
- Interactive map
- Location: Dundee, Michigan
- Coordinates: 41°57′22″N 83°39′38″W
- NRHP reference No.: 90001239
- Added to NRHP: August 20, 1990

The Dundee Historic Village is a historic district located in Dundee, Michigan. The district was added to the National Register of Historic Places on August 20, 1990. This area is commonly referred to as the downtown area of Dundee and was settled almost concurrently with the Old Village Historic District in nearby Monroe. Both were built in their respective locations due to the River Raisin. Originally, the buildings within the district were small, wood buildings, but these were eventually replaced with two-story, brick storefronts. Most of the surviving buildings were built between 1866 and 1900, although the district traces its origins to Dundee's establishment in 1825.

The district itself is located about one mile east of US-23 along M-50 (known locally as West Monroe Street east of the river and Tecumseh Street to the west of the river) at the bend of the River Raisin. The majority of the district is on the north side of the river— including Riley, Ypsilanti, East Main, and Tecumseh Streets. South of the river includes a small portion of West Monroe and Toledo Streets. The district is colloquially known as the “Triangle District” for the unique shape of the grid plan where Riley and Tecumseh streets intersect at a 45° angle to produce a triangular piece of land cut off by Park Place on the west. The original owners of this triangular plot of land donated it to the village with the promise that it remain undeveloped as a park in the center of the growing community. Today, the triangle is known as Memorial Park, complete with a naval cannon and bandstand.

== Old Mill Museum ==
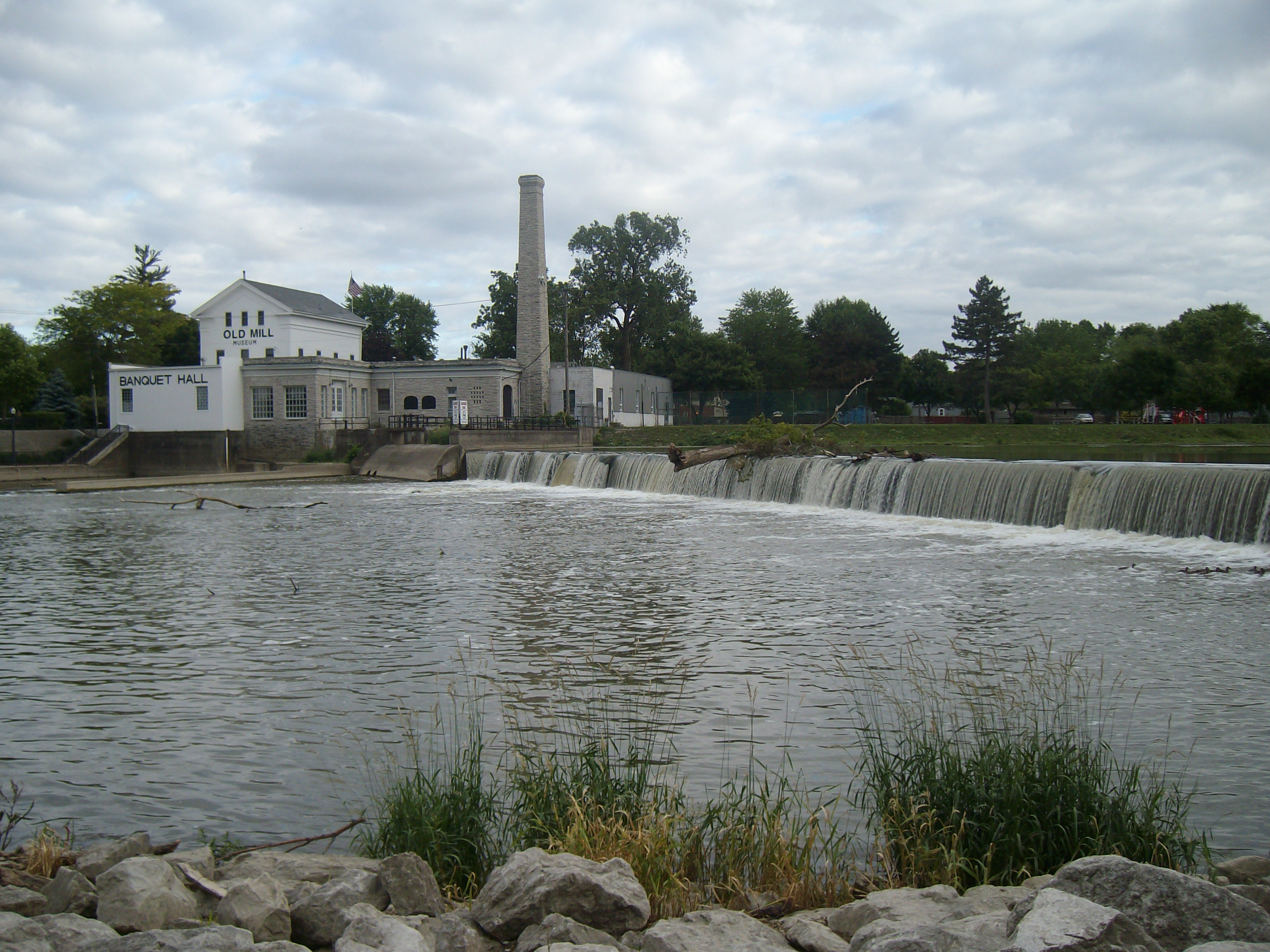
The Old Mill Museum

The most notable building within the district is the Old Mill Museum at 242 Toledo Street on the opposite side of the river from the majority of the district. While the facility itself was not built until the 1850s, the dam upon which it is located was first constructed in 1827 and rebuilt in 1846. The facility first served as a gristmill for the growing milling industry in Dundee. Later, the building was converted to produce hydroelectricity as the village's only source of power around 1910. Automotive magnate Henry Ford purchased the building and restored it at great cost in 1934. He used it as a small factory to produce welding tips for his industry, and he was known to make many visits to Dundee. His interest in Dundee was an experiment to see if small towns could be used for his massive, global industry. After Ford's death in 1947, support for this small factory diminished, and it was sold in 1954 to the Wolverine Manufacturing Company, where the building was converted once more to produce paper products. The Wolverine Manufacturing Company used the facility until 1970. The village purchased and revamped the structure and its surrounding 13.8 acres (5.6 ha) for public use as a museum and park. Although the property is praised for its historical nature, it is not listed on the National Register of Historic Places in its own right.
