= M-188 (Michigan highway) =

State highway in Eaton and Ingham counties in Michigan, United States

M-188
- M-188 highlighted in red

Route information
- Maintained by MDOT
- Length: 4.559 mi (7.337 km)
- Existed: 1932–present

Major junctions
- West end: M-99 / M-50 near Eaton Rapids
- East end: VFW National Home for Children southeast of Eaton Rapids

Location
- Country: United States
- State: Michigan
- Counties: Eaton, Ingham

Highway system
- Michigan State Trunkline Highway System; Interstate; US; State; Byways
← M-186	→ M-189

M-188 is a 4.559-mile-long (7.337 km) state trunkline highway in the US state of Michigan. It runs from Eaton Rapids to the VFW National Home for Children, southeast of town through a rural area. Approximately 1,000 vehicles each day use a highway that was first designated in the 1930s and paved in the 1940s.

== Route description ==
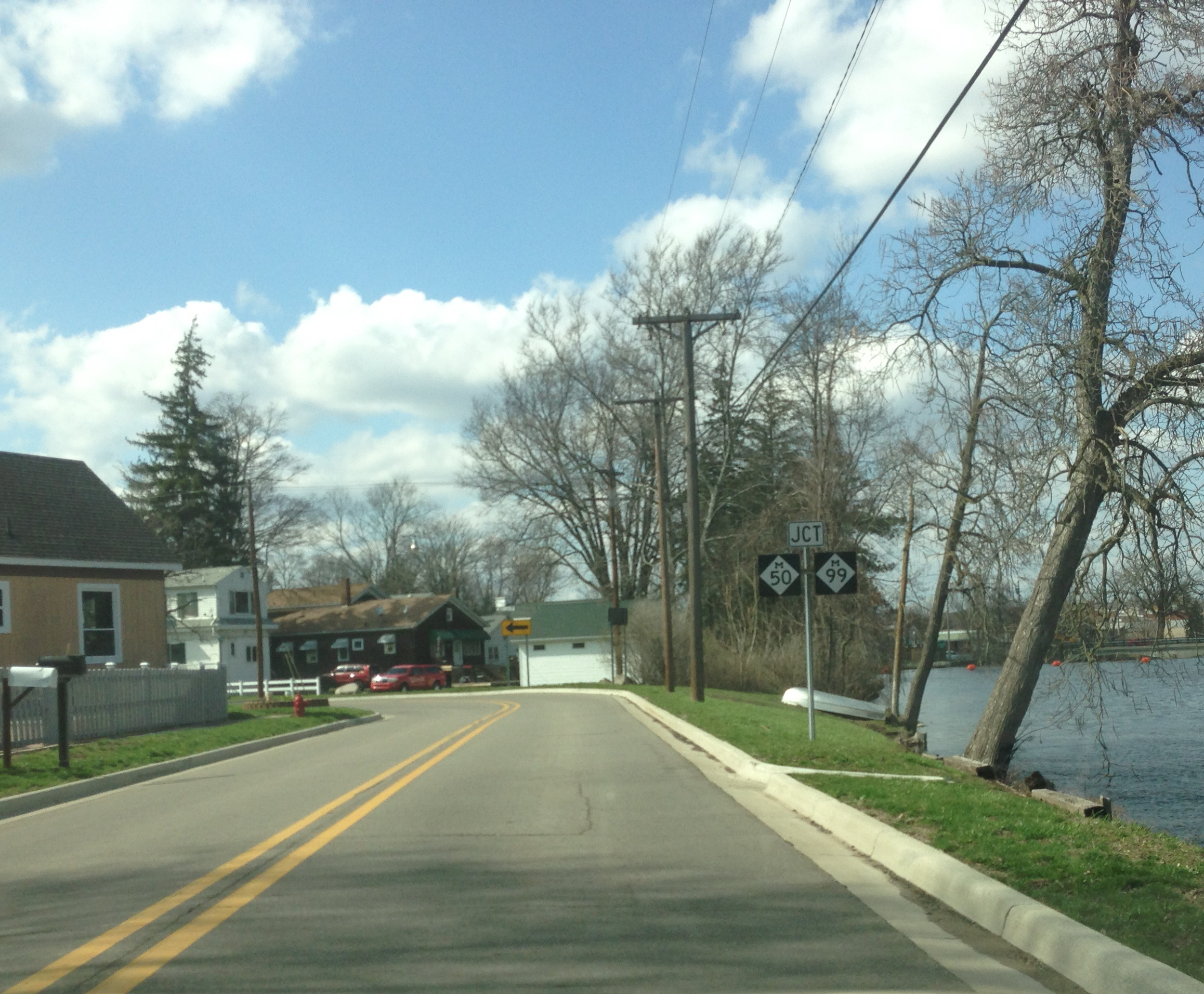
Running along the Grand River in Eaton Rapids

Starting in Eaton Rapids, M-188 heads eastward from the intersection with M-99/M-50 (Michigan highway) toward the Grand River. The highway follows Water Street southeasterly along the river through residential neighborhoods and exits town. M-188 turns back due east on VFW Road to run through farm fields. Near the intersection with Tucker Road, the highway turns south and then southeasterly to avoid a bend in the river. After this bend, VFW Road once again runs due east to the intersection with Waverly Road. M-188 turns south on Waverly Road, which runs along the Eaton–Ingham county line. The M-188 designation ends at the VFW National Home for Children about one mile (1.6 km) south of VFW Road.

M-188 is maintained by the Michigan Department of Transportation (MDOT) like other state highways in Michigan. As a part of these maintenance responsibilities, the department tracks the volume of traffic that uses the roadways under its jurisdiction. These volumes are expressed using a metric called annual average daily traffic, which is a statistical calculation of the average daily number of vehicles on a segment of roadway. MDOT's surveys in 2010 showed that 986 vehicles in the city of Eaton Rapids, and 1,103 used the trunkline outside of town, traveled along the highway on average. M-188 has not been listed on the National Highway System, a network of roads important to the country's economy, defense, and mobility.

== History ==
M-188 was designated in late 1932, providing highway access to the VFW National Home from Eaton Rapids in southeast Eaton County. In early 1941, the trunkline was completely paved; and the highway has been unchanged since.

== Major intersections ==
County	Location	mi	km	Destinations	Notes
Eaton	Eaton Rapids	0.000	0.000	M-50 / M-99 – Charlotte, Lansing, Albion	
Eaton– Ingham	Hamlin Township – Onondaga Township	4.559	7.337	VFW National Home for Children	
1.000 mi = 1.609 km; 1.000 km = 0.621 mi
