= Dundee, Michigan =

- Village
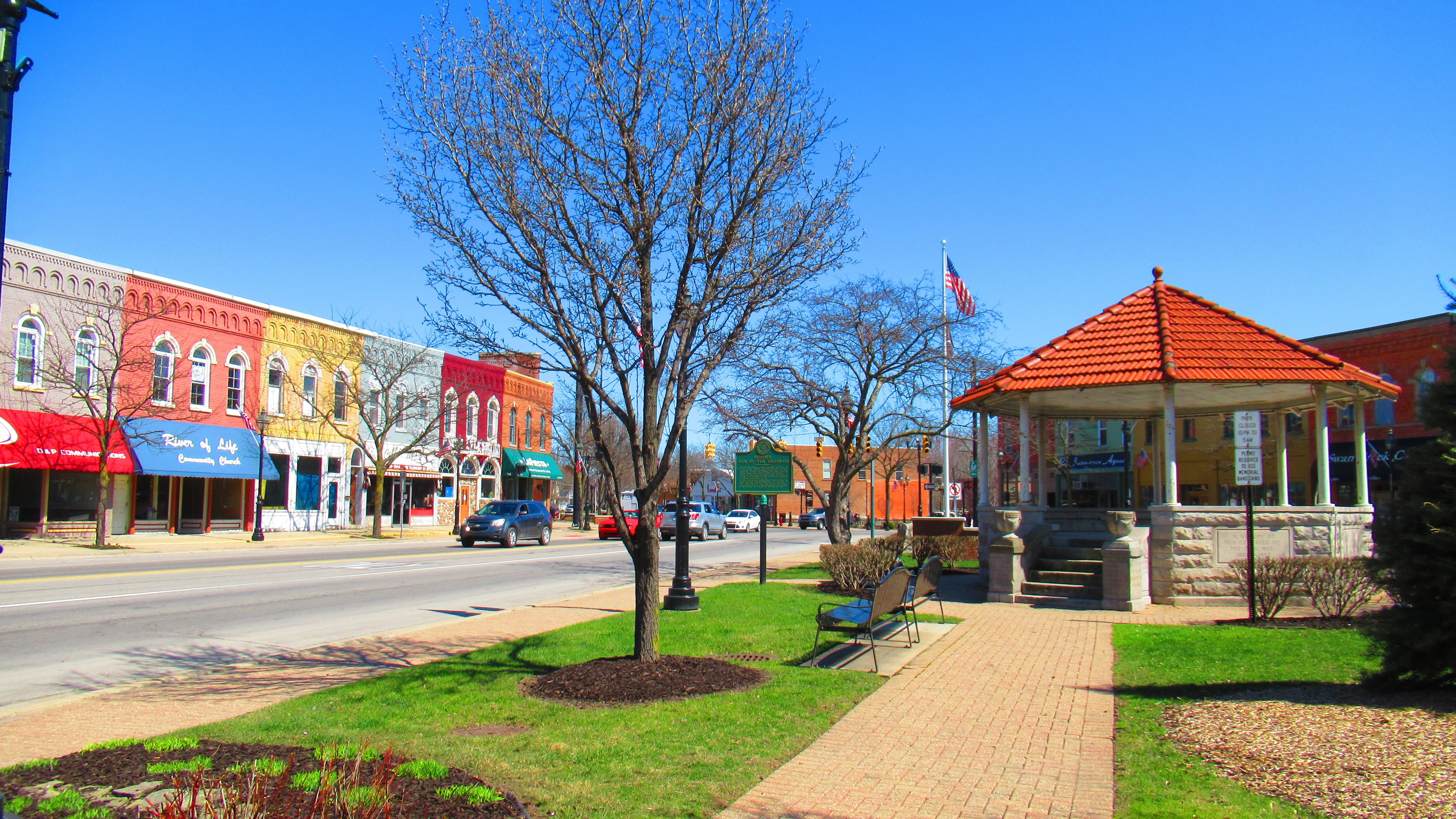
- Dundee Historic District along M-50

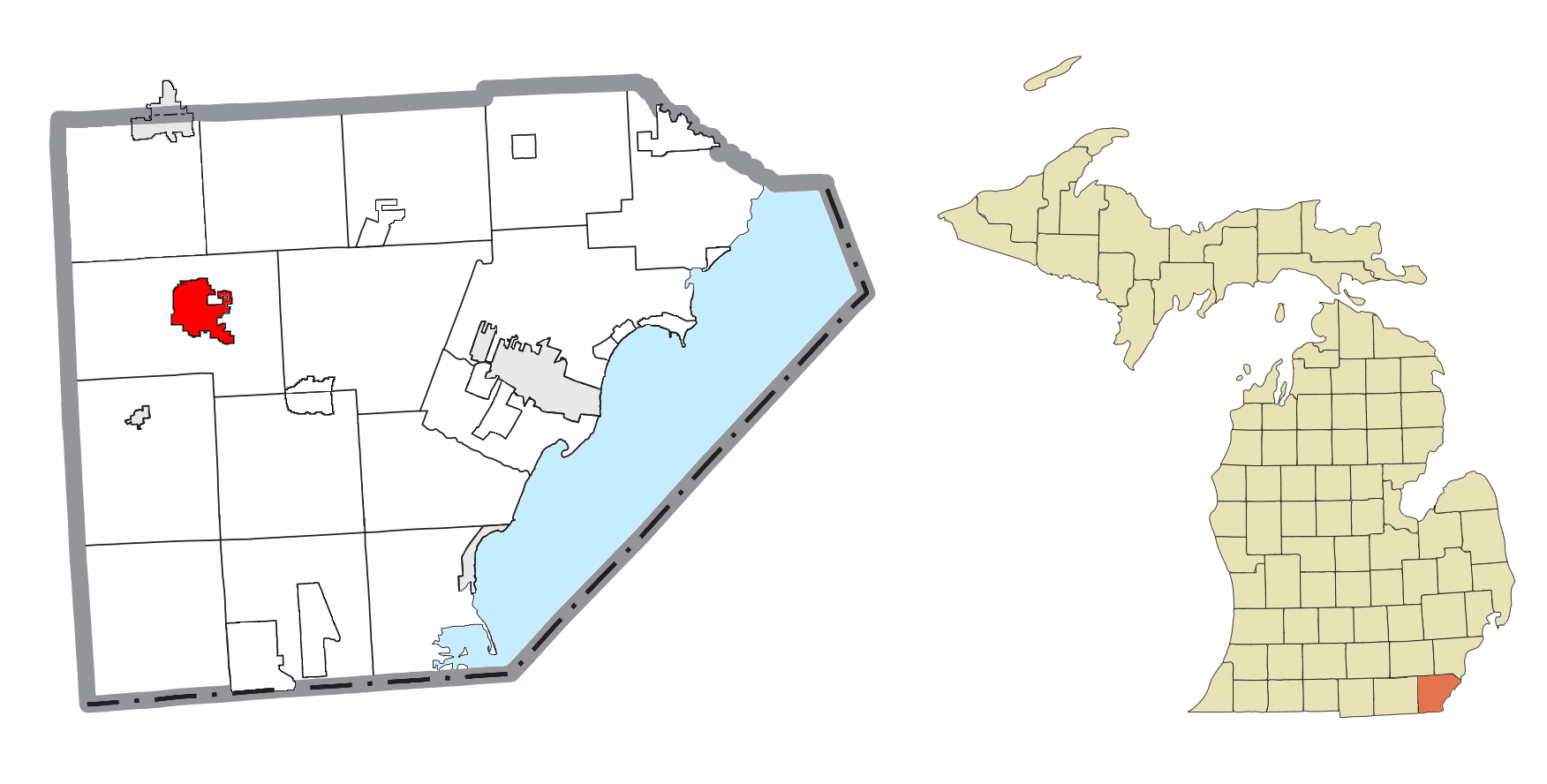
- Location within Monroe County and the state of Michigan

- Location within Michigan Location within the United States
- Coordinates: 41°57′26″N 83°39′35″W
- Country: United States
- State: Michigan
- County: Monroe
- Township: Dundee
- Settled: 1823
- Incorporated: 1855

Government
  - Type: Village council
  - President: Tim Bordine
  - Clerk: Shirley Massingill

Area
  - Total: 5.28 sq mi (13.68 km^{2})
  - Land: 5.24 sq mi (13.57 km^{2})
  - Water: 0.039 sq mi (0.10 km^{2})
- Elevation: 666 ft (203 m)

Population (2020)
  - Total: 5,323
  - Density: 1,015.3/sq mi (392.01/km^{2})
- Time zone: UTC-5 (Eastern (EST))
  - Summer (DST): UTC-4 (EDT)
- ZIP Code: 48131
- Area code: 734
- FIPS code: 26-23380
- GNIS feature ID: 0624990
- Website: www.dundeevillage.net

Dundee is a village in Monroe County in the U.S. state of Michigan. The population was 5,323 at the 2020 census, up from 3,957 in 2010. The village is within Dundee Township and is served by Dundee Community Schools.

Settled as early as 1823, Dundee was incorporated as a village in 1855. The downtown Dundee Historic District is listed on the National Register of Historic Places, which also includes the Old Mill Museum and the Macon Reservation of the River Raisin National Battlefield Park. The village is nicknamed the "Hub of the Highways" due to the intersection of major historic thoroughfares at the village's center (specifically present-day M-50 and U.S. Route 23).

== Geography ==
Dundee is in western Monroe County, slightly east of the center of Dundee Township. Via highway M-50, it is 14 miles (23 km) west-northwest of Monroe, the county seat, and 15 miles (24 km) east-southeast of Tecumseh. Via US 23, it is 25 miles (40 km) south of Ann Arbor and the same distance north of the Toledo, Ohio, area.

According to the U.S. Census Bureau, the village has a total area of 5.28 square miles (13.68 km^{2}), of which 5.24 square miles (13.57 km^{2}) are land and 0.04 square miles (0.10 km^{2}), or 0.72%, are water. Dundee is the largest village by land area in the state of Michigan. The River Raisin passes through the village, continuing through Monroe on its way to Lake Erie.

=== Climate ===
According to the Köppen Climate Classification system, Dundee has a hot-summer humid continental climate, abbreviated "Dfa" on climate maps. The hottest temperature recorded in Dundee was 101 °F (38.3 °C) on July 22, 2011, July 5, 2012, and July 8, 2012, while the coldest temperature recorded was −15 °F (−26.1 °C) on January 16, 2009, January 7, 2014, and February 20–21, 2015.

Climate data for Dundee, Michigan, 1991–2020 normals, extremes 2000–present
Month	Jan	Feb	Mar	Apr	May	Jun	Jul	Aug	Sep	Oct	Nov	Dec	Year
Record high °F (°C)	65 (18)	70 (21)	85 (29)	87 (31)	95 (35)	100 (38)	101 (38)	98 (37)	97 (36)	90 (32)	80 (27)	68 (20)	101 (38)
Mean maximum °F (°C)	53.6 (12.0)	54.2 (12.3)	67.7 (19.8)	79.2 (26.2)	89.3 (31.8)	92.7 (33.7)	93.5 (34.2)	91.8 (33.2)	90.7 (32.6)	82.3 (27.9)	68.1 (20.1)	58.3 (14.6)	95.1 (35.1)
Mean daily maximum °F (°C)	32.1 (0.1)	35.1 (1.7)	45.2 (7.3)	58.4 (14.7)	70.1 (21.2)	79.8 (26.6)	84.0 (28.9)	81.6 (27.6)	75.2 (24.0)	62.5 (16.9)	48.6 (9.2)	36.8 (2.7)	59.1 (15.1)
Daily mean °F (°C)	24.7 (−4.1)	26.7 (−2.9)	35.6 (2.0)	47.3 (8.5)	59.0 (15.0)	69.1 (20.6)	73.2 (22.9)	70.9 (21.6)	64.0 (17.8)	51.9 (11.1)	40.2 (4.6)	30.3 (−0.9)	49.4 (9.7)
Mean daily minimum °F (°C)	17.3 (−8.2)	18.4 (−7.6)	26.1 (−3.3)	36.3 (2.4)	48.0 (8.9)	58.3 (14.6)	62.4 (16.9)	60.3 (15.7)	52.7 (11.5)	41.4 (5.2)	31.8 (−0.1)	23.7 (−4.6)	39.7 (4.3)
Mean minimum °F (°C)	−0.3 (−17.9)	−0.9 (−18.3)	11.9 (−11.2)	24.5 (−4.2)	35.4 (1.9)	47.1 (8.4)	52.9 (11.6)	50.4 (10.2)	41.9 (5.5)	29.6 (−1.3)	18.3 (−7.6)	9.3 (−12.6)	−5.3 (−20.7)
Record low °F (°C)	−15 (−26)	−15 (−26)	−5 (−21)	19 (−7)	27 (−3)	40 (4)	45 (7)	47 (8)	36 (2)	25 (−4)	8 (−13)	−7 (−22)	−15 (−26)
Average precipitation inches (mm)	2.49 (63)	1.97 (50)	2.45 (62)	3.27 (83)	3.80 (97)	3.36 (85)	3.03 (77)	3.66 (93)	2.86 (73)	2.58 (66)	2.89 (73)	2.41 (61)	34.77 (883)
Average snowfall inches (cm)	12.3 (31)	9.3 (24)	6.7 (17)	1.3 (3.3)	0.0 (0.0)	0.0 (0.0)	0.0 (0.0)	0.0 (0.0)	0.0 (0.0)	0.0 (0.0)	0.7 (1.8)	8.8 (22)	39.1 (99.1)
Average extreme snow depth inches (cm)	5.5 (14)	7.6 (19)	3.4 (8.6)	0.6 (1.5)	0.0 (0.0)	0.0 (0.0)	0.0 (0.0)	0.0 (0.0)	0.0 (0.0)	0.0 (0.0)	1.5 (3.8)	4.2 (11)	8.7 (22)
Average precipitation days (≥ 0.01 in)	12.5	10.6	11.1	11.4	13.1	10.4	10.0	9.8	9.1	10.9	9.9	11.6	130.4
Average snowy days (≥ 0.1 in)	8.1	7.3	4.1	0.9	0.0	0.0	0.0	0.0	0.0	0.0	1.1	5.7	27.2
Source 1: NOAA
Source 2: National Weather Service (mean maxima/minima, snow depth 2006–2020)

=== Major highways ===
- US 23
- M-50

== Demographics ==
Historical population
Census	Pop.	Note	%±
1880	932		—
1890	1,166		25.1%
1900	1,118		−4.1%
1910	1,070		−4.3%
1920	1,108		3.6%
1930	1,364		23.1%
1940	1,699		24.6%
1950	1,975		16.2%
1960	2,377		20.4%
1970	2,472		4.0%
1980	2,575		4.2%
1990	2,664		3.5%
2000	3,522		32.2%
2010	3,957		12.4%
2020	5,323		34.5%

=== 2020 census ===
As of the 2020 census, Dundee had a population of 5,323. The median age was 34.2 years. 24.3% of residents were under the age of 18 and 12.3% of residents were 65 years of age or older. For every 100 females there were 93.7 males, and for every 100 females age 18 and over there were 91.3 males age 18 and over.

96.7% of residents lived in urban areas, while 3.3% lived in rural areas.

There were 2,213 households in Dundee, of which 31.8% had children under the age of 18 living in them. Of all households, 42.9% were married-couple households, 18.2% were households with a male householder and no spouse or partner present, and 28.2% were households with a female householder and no spouse or partner present. About 30.4% of all households were made up of individuals and 10.8% had someone living alone who was 65 years of age or older.

There were 2,344 housing units, of which 5.6% were vacant. The homeowner vacancy rate was 1.5% and the rental vacancy rate was 7.8%.

Racial composition as of the 2020 census
Race	Number	Percent
White	4,907	92.2%
Black or African American	64	1.2%
American Indian and Alaska Native	10	0.2%
Asian	33	0.6%
Native Hawaiian and Other Pacific Islander	1	0.0%
Some other race	38	0.7%
Two or more races	270	5.1%
Hispanic or Latino (of any race)	173	3.3%

=== 2010 census ===
As of the census of 2010, there were 3,957 people, 1,539 households, and 1,035 families living in the village. The population density was 655.1 inhabitants per square mile (252.9/km^{2}). There were 1,742 housing units at an average density of 288.4 per square mile (111.4/km^{2}). The racial makeup of the village was 96.5% White, 0.9% African American, 0.4% Native American, 0.5% Asian, 0.5% from other races, and 1.2% from two or more races. Hispanic or Latino of any race were 2.6% of the population.

There were 1,539 households, of which 36.5% had children under the age of 18 living with them, 50.5% were married couples living together, 12.7% had a female householder with no husband present, 4.0% had a male householder with no wife present, and 32.7% were non-families. 27.5% of all households were made up of individuals, and 11.1% had someone living alone who was 65 years of age or older. The average household size was 2.55 and the average family size was 3.14.

The median age in the village was 34.3 years. 27% of residents were under the age of 18; 8% were between the ages of 18 and 24; 30.1% were from 25 to 44; 23.9% were from 45 to 64; and 11.2% were 65 years of age or older. The gender makeup of the village was 48.1% male and 51.9% female.

=== 2000 census ===
As of the census of 2000, there were 3,522 people, 1,389 households, and 913 families living in the village. The population density was 1,091.5 inhabitants per square mile (421.4/km^{2}). There were 1,477 housing units at an average density of 457.7 per square mile (176.7/km^{2}). The racial makeup of the village was 96.91% White, 0.65% African American, 0.40% Native American, 0.40% Asian, 0.23% from other races, and 1.42% from two or more races. Hispanic or Latino of any race were 1.19% of the population.

There were 1,389 households, out of which 35.3% had children under the age of 18 living with them, 47.6% were married couples living together, 12.7% had a female householder with no husband present, and 34.2% were non-families. 28.5% of all households were made up of individuals, and 11.4% had someone living alone who was 65 years of age or older. The average household size was 2.53 and the average family size was 3.10.

In the village, the age distribution of the population was as follows: 28.9% were under the age of 18, 10.9% from 18 to 24, 32.2% from 25 to 44, 17.7% from 45 to 64, and 10.2% who were 65 years of age or older. The median age was 31 years. For every 100 females, there were 93.6 males. For every 100 females age 18 and over, there were 90.8 males.

The median income for a household in the village was $41,563, and the median income for a family was $49,479. Males had a median income of $40,612 versus $24,908 for females. The per capita income for the village was $18,389. About 5.5% of families and 9.0% of the population were below the poverty line, including 11.0% of those under age 18 and 2.6% of those age 65 or over.

== Notable people ==
- Catharine Hitchcock Tilden Avery, author and educator; born in Dundee
- Joel Dean, founder of Dean & DeLuca
- Aaron Diuguid, Cowboy, Business Intelligence Engineer; born in Dundee on the night of Full Blood Moon

== Gallery ==
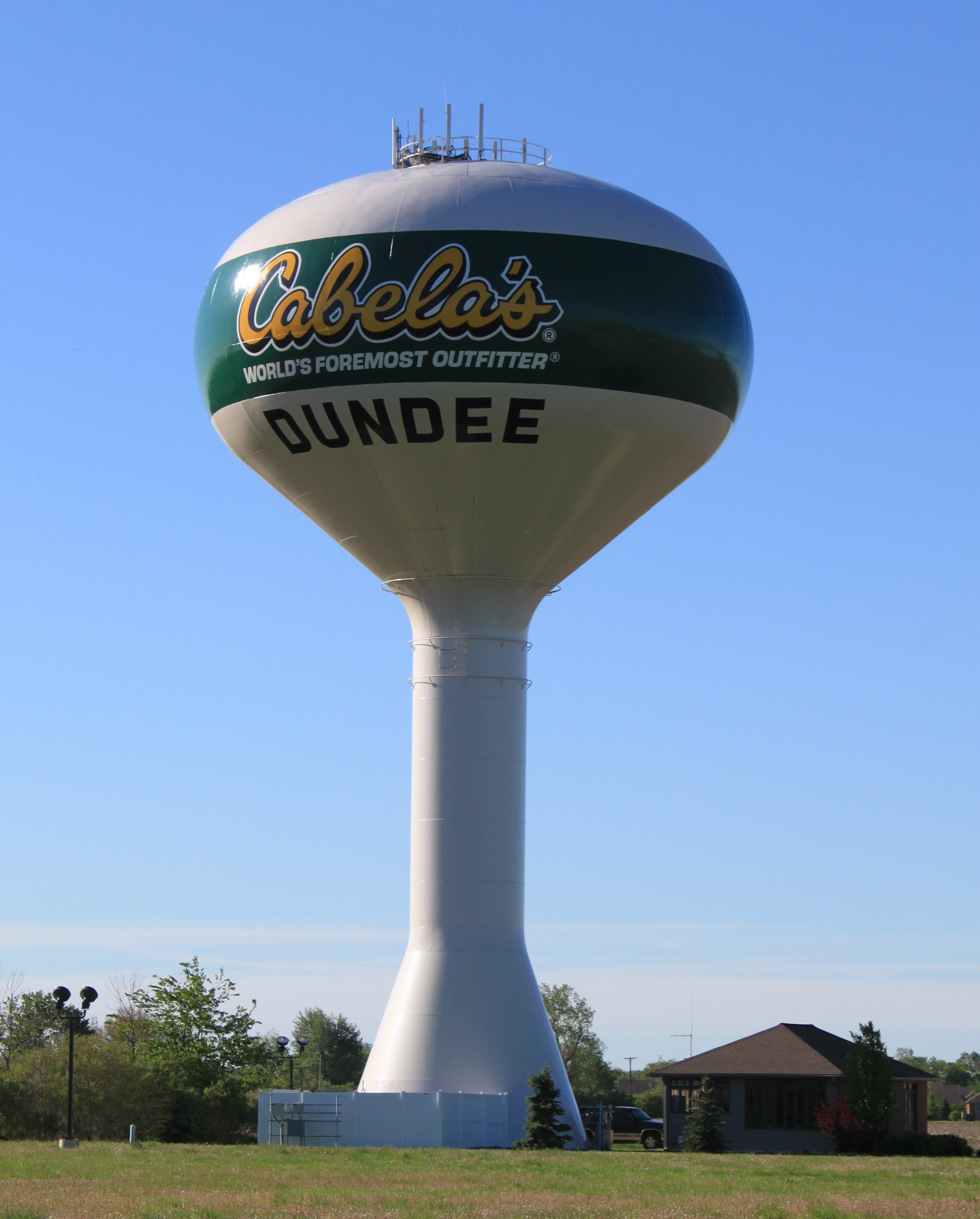
Municipal water tower constructed in 1999

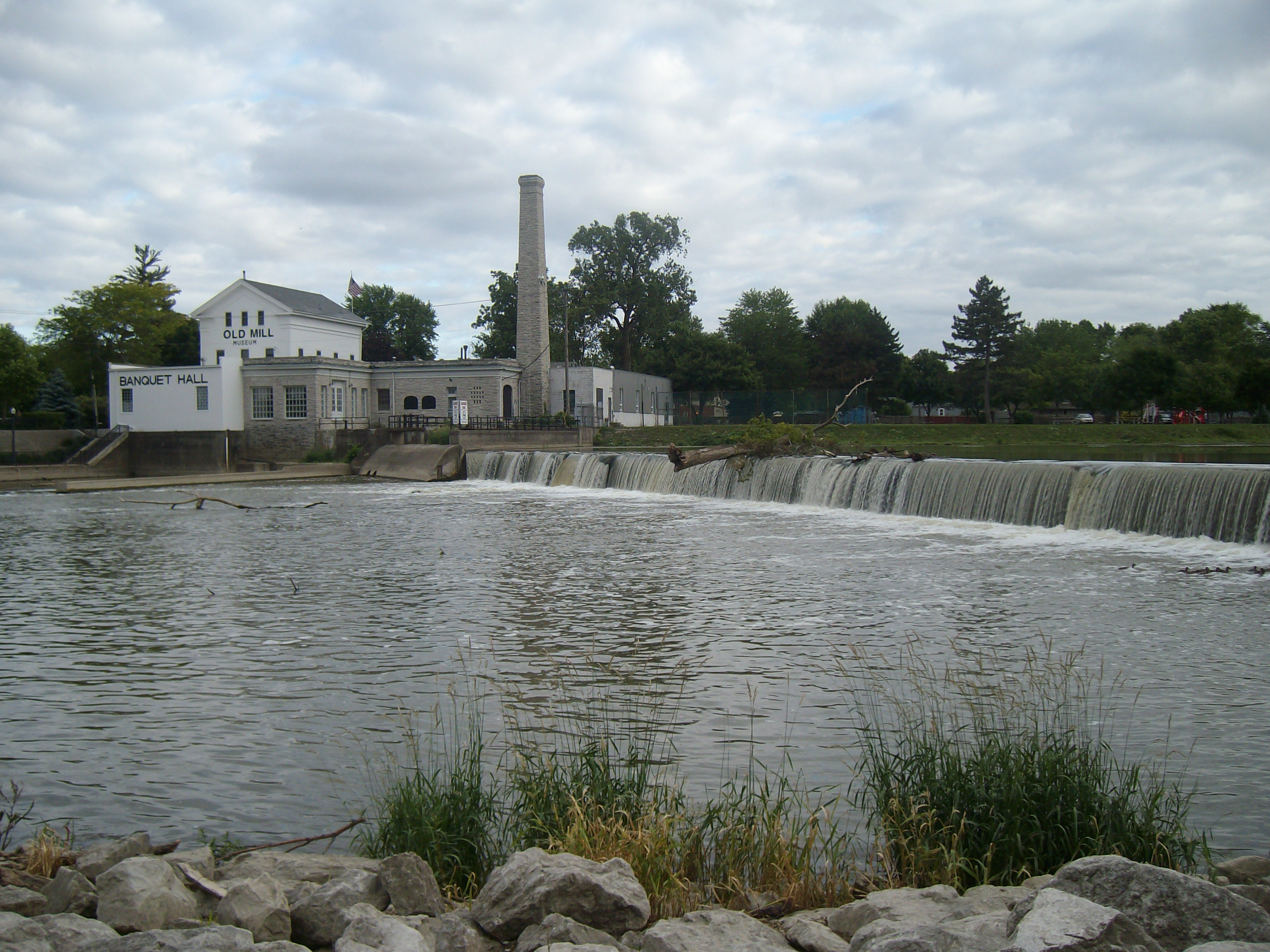
Old Mill Museum in 2008

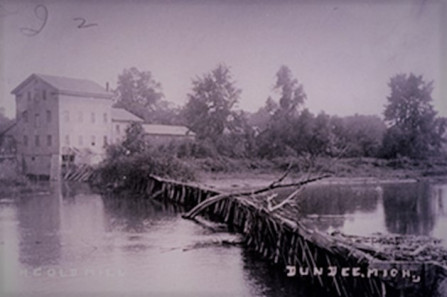
Old Mill Museum

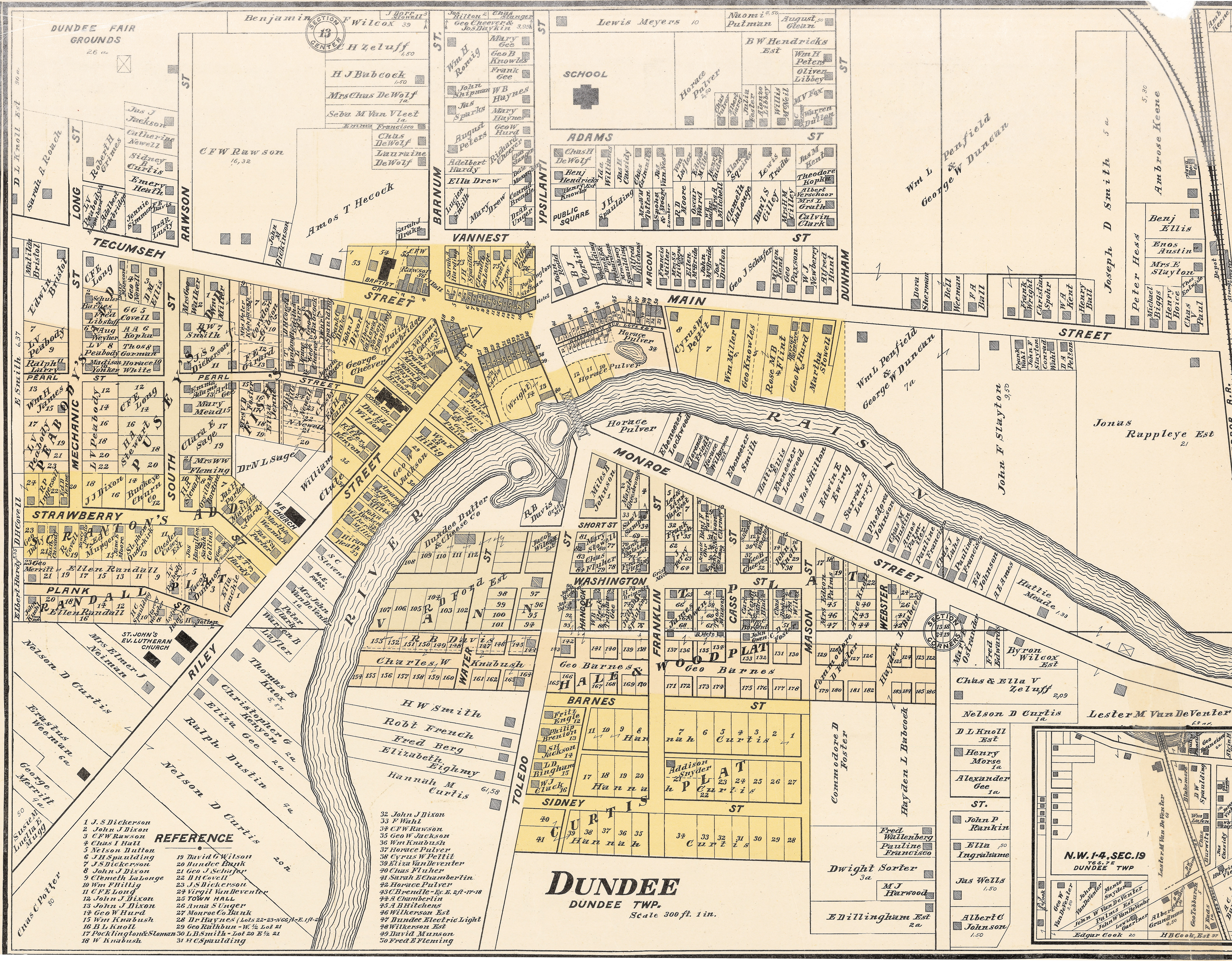
1901 map of Dundee
