= M-50 (Michigan highway) =

State highway in Michigan, United States

M-50
- M-50 highlighted in red

Route information
- Maintained by MDOT
- Length: 138.072 mi (222.205 km)
- Existed: c. July 1, 1919–present

Major junctions
- West end: I-96 near Alto
- M-43 / M-66 near Woodbury; I-69 / M-79 in Charlotte; I-94 / US 127 near Jackson; M-106 in Jackson; US 12 near Brooklyn; M-52 near Tecumseh; US 23 in Dundee
- East end: US 24 in Monroe

Location
- Country: United States
- State: Michigan
- Counties: Kent, Ionia, Barry, Eaton, Jackson, Lenawee, Monroe

Highway system
- Michigan State Trunkline Highway System; Interstate; US; State; Byways
← M-49	→ M-51

M-50 is a state trunkline highway in the US state of Michigan. Although designated as an east–west highway, it is nearly a diagonal northwest–southeast route. The western terminus is at exit 52 along Interstate 96 (I-96) near Alto a few miles east of the metro Grand Rapids area, and its eastern terminus is in downtown Monroe at US Highway 24 (US 24, Telegraph Road). In between the trunkline runs through seven counties of the southern part of the Lower Peninsula mostly through rural farm fields and small communities. The highway also runs through downtown Jackson to connect between two freeway sections of US 127. In the Irish Hills area of the state southeast of Jackson, M-50 runs next to Michigan International Speedway.

Dating back to the early days of the state highway system, M-50 was first signed in the southeastern corner of the state in 1919. During the 1920s, the highway was extended to the Grand Rapids area and beyond to Lake Michigan, making it a trans-peninsular route connecting that Great Lake with Lake Erie. A rerouting of highways including M-50 through Grand Rapids in the 1950s created Business M-50 (Bus. M-50), a business loop through that city that lasted for eight years. Additional changes made during the 1960s rerouted M-50 to replace its business loop until the highway was shortened to its present western terminus south of Lowell. A pair of truncations in Monroe in 1996 and 2006 are responsible for the present-day eastern terminus.

== Route description ==
=== Lowell to Jackson ===
M-50 begins at an interchange with I-96 at exit 52 south of Lowell in southeastern Kent County. The highway proceeds south along with Alden Nash Avenue and turns east on 92nd Street through farms and fields in the rural southeastern corner of the county. As the trunkline runs to the east, it crosses into Ionia County. M-50 follows Thompson Road, Nash Highway and Tupper Lake Road into Lake Odessa. In Lake Odessa, the road bends around the north side of Jordan Lake, curving to the south into the extreme northeastern Barry County. The highway turns back to the east as it heads towards a junction with M-66 and M-43 at the Barry–Eaton county line.

After meeting M-43, the two trunklines run concurrently for about a mile (1.6 km) before M-50 breaks off to the southwest near Woodbury. From there, the road continues in its southeasterly path along Clinton Trail through the northeast part of Eaton County as it runs through fields to Charlotte. Just prior to entering the city, the road bends to the south and near the middle of town it has a junction with M-79 and Business Loop I-69 (BL I-69). After this intersection, M-50 continues south concurrent with the business loop for several blocks before turning eastward. On the eastern end of town, it has an interchange with I-69 at exit 60.

After heading east past the junction with I-69, the highway turns southeast as it heads through rural fields toward Eaton Rapids. Once it reaches the city, M-50 converges with M-99, and the two intersect M-188 on the south side of the Grand River. The two highways run south out of the city. Immediately prior to entering Jackson County, the two trunklines diverge with M-99 heading off to the southwest and M-50 to the southeast.

M-50 continues its journey through Jackson County, winding its way to the southeast through rural fields and small forests. The landscape transitions to residential neighborhoods as the road approaches the US 127 freeway north of Jackson. In Blackman Township, M-50 merges with US 127 to run concurrently into the north side of Jackson. After an interchange with I-94 at exit 138, US 127 exits to run east on I-94 for four miles (6.4 km), M-50 and Business US 127 (Bus. US 127) run concurrently into the city as West Avenue passing by the Jackson Crossing shopping mall. The road then proceeds south through the northern side of the city before turning east on Michigan Avenue as it heads towards downtown.

=== Jackson to Monroe ===
In downtown Jackson, Michigan Avenue continues into downtown while M-50 is routed around the city center on Louis Glick Highway. On the east side of downtown at an intersection with M-106 (Cooper Street), Bus. US 127/M-50 turns south along Cooper Street while BL I-94 continues eastward on Michigan Avenue. The highway crosses the Grand River south of Jackson station and continues along Cooper Street south and then southeast until it becomes Brooklyn Road at the city limit. South of Jackson, M-50 and US 127 meet up once again just east of Vandercook Lake. M-50 follows the US 127 freeway through a pair of conjoined partial interchanges before M-50 heads east away from Vandercook Lake resuming the Brooklyn Road routing.

The trunkline then heads southeast to Napoleon, where the road then turns south and heads towards Brooklyn, part of the Irish Hills area of Lenawee County, a region known for its scenery. The road serves as main street for downtown Brooklyn as well as the primary thoroughfare for drivers headed to Michigan International Speedway. M-50 curves around the north and east side of the race track before intersecting US 12 in Cambridge Junction. After crossing US 12, the road passes between several lakes of the Irish Hills area including Washington, Little Stony and Marrs lakes before continuing on its southeasterly journey towards Tecumseh.

After leaving the Brooklyn area, the road returns to a rural environment as it cuts through agricultural fields. Before passing through Tipton, M-50 passes the entrance to Hidden Lake Gardens, a botanical garden and arboretum operated by Michigan State University. After passing Hidden Lake, the road intersects M-52 and continues into Tecumseh. Known as Chicago Boulevard, the road serves as the main route through the city. After leaving Tecumseh, the highway passes through the communities of Ridgeway and Britton before leaving Lenawee County.

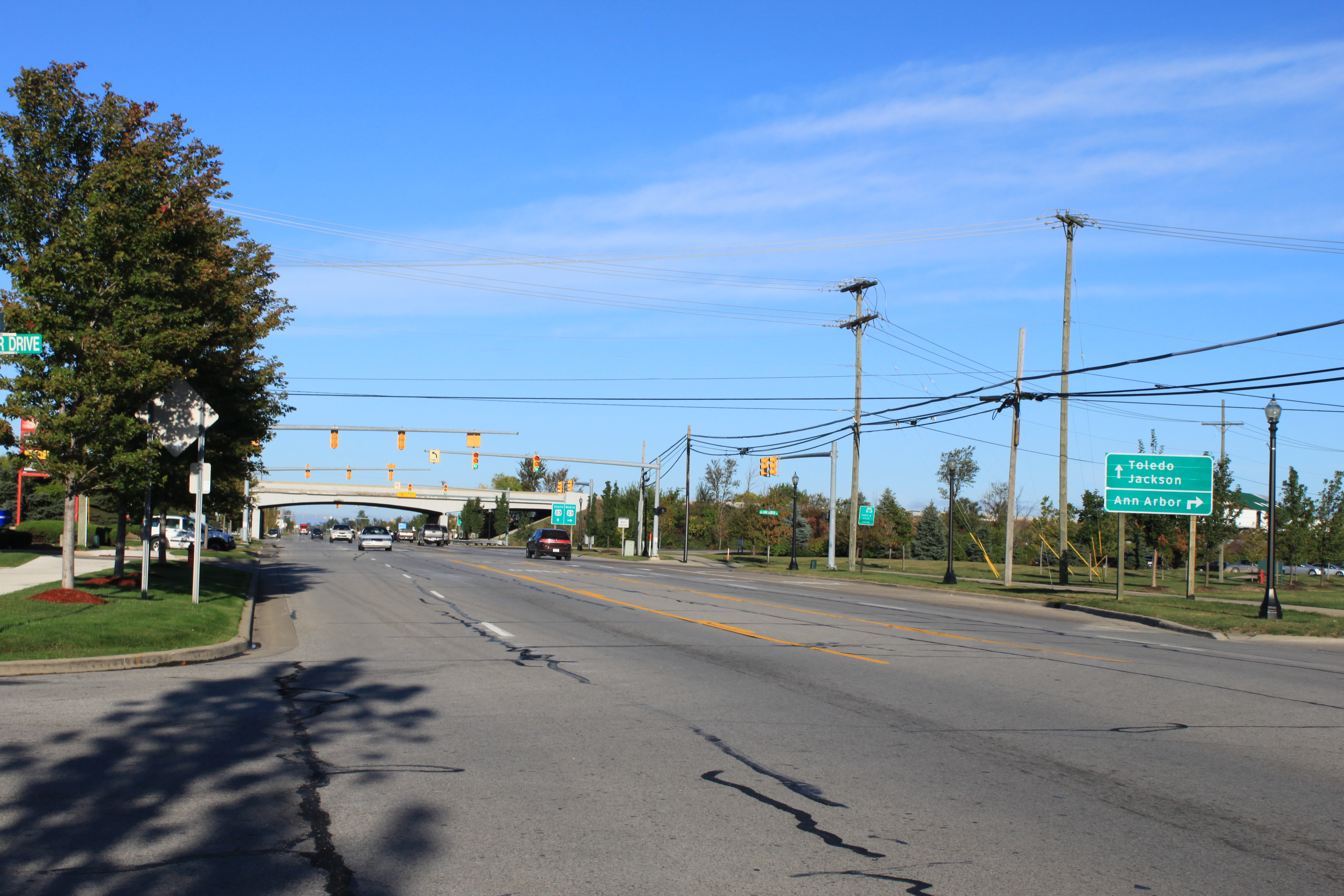
M-50 facing west toward the interchange with US 23 in Dundee

M-50 begins the final leg of its journey, as it crosses into Monroe county, passing through land that is mostly fields. Prior to reaching its interchange with US 23, the highway passes to the south of Cabela's, a 225,000-square-foot (20,900 m^{2}) outdoor sports retailer in Dundee. After leaving town, the trunkline continues to the southeast, running to the south of the River Raisin, through rural areas as South Custer Road before entering the outskirts of Monroe where it finally ends its journey at a junction with US 24 (Telegraph Road) a few miles inland from Lake Erie.

M-50 is maintained by the Michigan Department of Transportation (MDOT) like other state highways in Michigan. As a part of these maintenance responsibilities, the department tracks the volume of traffic that uses the roadways under its jurisdiction. These volumes are expressed using a metric called annual average daily traffic, which is a statistical calculation of the average daily number of vehicles on a segment of roadway. MDOT's surveys in 2011 showed that the highest traffic levels along M-50 were the 25,770 vehicles daily south of the Springport Road interchange in the Jackson area; the lowest counts were the 2,055 vehicles per day south of the M-99 concurrency. The only sections of M-50 that have been listed on the National Highway System (NHS) are the two US 127 concurrencies in the Jackson area and the connection between them through downtown. The NHS is a network of roads important to the country's economy, defense, and mobility.

== History ==
When the state highway system was first signed in 1919, M-50 started at an intersection with M-23 (present-day US 12) in Cambridge Junction, south of Brooklyn. From there it ran to the southeast, similar to its present-day routing, through Dundee and Tecumseh into downtown Monroe where it intersected M-56. There was a concurrency between M-50 and M-65 between Dundee and the Ida area which became an overlap with US 23 after 1926. By the end of 1927, M-50 underwent a major lengthening as its western terminus was extended through Jackson to Eaton Rapids, Charlotte, and Vermontville before intersecting M-39 just east of Woodbury. From this point, M-50 was routed over M-39 to US 16 near Alto. M-50 then ran concurrently with US 16 into Grand Rapids where it turned to the west and traveled through Allendale before terminating at a junction with US 31 in Agnew. A few years later in 1929, the route between Charlotte and Woodbury was changed as M-50 was routed north out of Charlotte to the former M-39 and replaced it east to Woodbury; the former routing was turned over to local control.

In 1953, the route was realigned onto the south and west beltline to bypass Grand Rapids; the old routing through downtown became Business M-50 (Bus. M-50). In the late 1950s, when the US 127 freeway bypass east of Jackson opened up, the old routing through town became Bus. US 127/M-50. At the same time, the concurrency with US 23 between Dundee and the Ida area was dropped after the new US 23 freeway opened; the old route becomes solely designated M-50.

In 1961, when the I-96/US 16/M-50 freeway was extended to the northwest in Grand Rapids, the old M-50 routing around the city became M-11 and M-50 was returned to its former alignment along Lake Michigan Drive and Fulton Street, supplanting Bus. M-50. In 1964, the western end of M-50 was truncated from its junction with US 31 back to I-96 south of Lowell at exit 52. The former alignment from exit 40 to Agnew was given the M-45 designation.

In 1996, the highway was truncated as the terminus was scaled back to M-125 in Monroe. Finally on October 4, 2006, the section of M-50 between M-125 and US 24 was also removed, shortening the highway by about a mile (1.9 km).

== Major intersections ==
County	Location	mi	km	Exit	Destinations	Notes
Kent	Lowell Township	0.000– 0.063	0.000– 0.101		I-96 – Grand Rapids, Lansing	Exit 52 on I-96
Ionia	No major junctions					
Barry	No major junctions					
Barry–Eaton county line	Woodland–Sunfield township line	22.124	35.605		M-43 west – Hastings; M-66 – Battle Creek, Ionia	Western end of M-43 concurrency
Eaton	Sunfield Township	23.423	37.696		M-43 east – Lansing	Eastern end of M-43 concurrency
Eaton	Charlotte	41.347	66.542		M-79 west (West Lawrence Avenue) – Hastings BL I-69 north (East Lawrence Avenue)	Northern end of BL I-69 concurrency; eastern terminus of M-79
Eaton	Charlotte	41.958	67.525		BL I-69 south	Southern end of BL I-69 concurrency
Eaton	Eaton Township	42.707– 42.727	68.730– 68.762		I-69 – Lansing, Ft. Wayne	Exit 60 on I-69
Eaton	Eaton Rapids	51.818	83.393		M-99 north – Lansing	Northern end of M-99 concurrency
Eaton	Eaton Rapids	52.317	84.196		M-188 east	Western terminus of M-188
Eaton	Hamlin Township	58.240	93.728		M-99 south – Albion	Southern end of M-99 concurrency
Jackson	Blackman Township	73.258	117.897	46	US 127 north – Lansing	Western end of US 127 concurrency at exit 46 on US 127; northern end of freeway; northbound exit and southbound entrance on US 127
Jackson	Blackman Township	73.539	118.350	45	Parnall Road	Provides access from eastbound M-50 to northbound US 127 and southbound US 127 to westbound M-50
Jackson	Blackman Township	74.416	119.761	44	Springport Road	
Jackson	Blackman Township	74.926– 74.934	120.582– 120.595	—	I-94 south / US 127 – Detroit, Chicago Bus. US 127 south	Southern end of US 127 concurrency and northern end of the Bus. US 127 concurrency; exit 138 on I-94 and exit 43 on US 127; southern end of freeway
Jackson	Jackson	76.672	123.392		BL I-94 (Michigan Avenue)	Western end of BL I-94 concurrency
Jackson	Jackson	77.901	125.370		BL I-94 east (Michigan Avenue) M-106 north – Stockbridge	Eastern end of BL I-94 concurrency; southern terminus of M-106
Jackson	Summit Township	79.818– 80.238	128.455– 129.131	34	US 127 – Lansing, Hudson Bus. US 127 north McDevitt Avenue	Southbound exit and northbound entrance from US 127 only; southern end of Bus. US 127 concurrency; eastbound M-50 is briefly concurrent with US 127 but westbound follows a ramp
Jackson	Brooklyn	91.508	147.268		M-124 east	Western terminus of M-124
Lenawee	Cambridge Township	94.782	152.537		US 12 – Coldwater, Ann Arbor	
Lenawee	Franklin Township	106.883	172.012		M-52 – Adrian, Chelsea	
Monroe	Dundee	124.466– 124.476	200.309– 200.325		US 23 – Ann Arbor, Toledo	Exit 17 on US 23
Monroe	Monroe	138.072	222.205		US 24 (Telegraph Road) – Detroit, Toledo	
1.000 mi = 1.609 km; 1.000 km = 0.621 mi: Concurrency terminus

== Business route ==
Business M-50
- Location: Walker–Grand Rapids
- Length: 11.084 mi (17.838 km)
- Existed: 1953–1961

Business M-50 (Bus. M-50) was a 11.084-mile-long (17.838 km) business loop that ran through Grand Rapids. The state trunkline highway was created when M-50 was rerouted to follow 28th Street and Wilson Avenue around the south and west sides of the city in 1953. The business loop was decommissioned when M-50 was returned to its former routing in 1961. The highway followed Lake Michigan Drive (now M-45) from the Standale neighborhood of Walker easterly to Fulton Street in Grand Rapids. From there it followed Fulton easterly through downtown Grand Rapids and the east side of the city to a junction with Cascade Road in Grand Rapids Township The last segment followed Cascade Road to the I-96/M-50 freeway where it connected with its parent highway and terminated.
