= Frank Harris (disambiguation) =

Frank Harris (1856–1931) was an editor, journalist and publisher.

Frank Harris may also refer to:

- Frank Harris (baseball) (1858–1939), infielder in Major League Baseball
- Frank Harris (quarterback, born 1948), former American football player
- Frank Harris (quarterback, born 1999), former American college football player
- Frank Harris (running back) (born 1964), American football player
- Frank Harris (director) (1943–2020), director and cinematographer
- Frank Harris (footballer, born 1899) (1899–1983), English football full back
- Frank Harris (cricketer) (1907–1936), English cricketer
- Frank Clifford Harris (1875–1949), British lyricist
- Frank Gaines Harris (1871–1944), Democratic politician from the state of Missouri
- Frank H. Harris (died 1987), American politician from Maryland
- Francis Harris (footballer) or Frank Harris (1908–1958), English footballer
- Francis Harris (physician) (1829–1885), English physician
- Frank Harris (Australian footballer) (1883–1961), Australian rules footballer
- Detective Frank Harris, a character in Cool World

== See also ==
- Franco Harris (1950–2022), American football player
- Frankie E. Harris Wassom (1850–1933), American writer
- Franklin S. Harris (1884–1960), president of Brigham Young University and Utah State University
