= Francis Harris =

Francis Harris may refer to:

- Francis Harris (footballer) (1908–1958), English footballer
- Francis Harris (physician) (1829–1885), English physician

== See also ==
- Frank Harris (disambiguation)
