= Custer Airport =

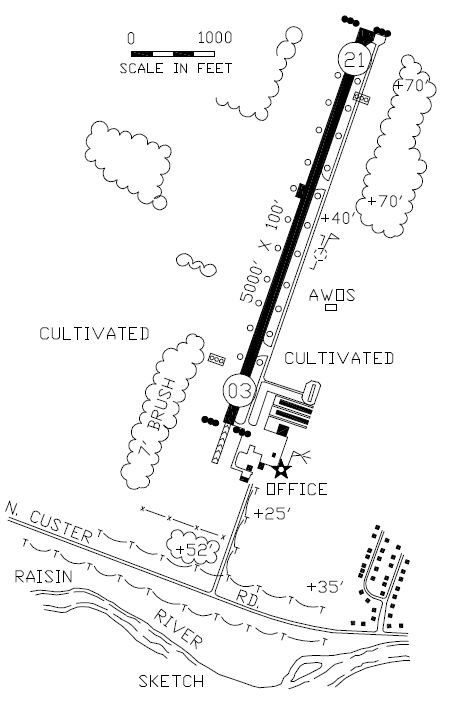
- IATA: none; ICAO: KTTF; FAA LID: TTF

Summary
- Airport type: Public
- Owner: City of Monroe
- Operator: Cleveland ARTCC
- Serves: Monroe, Michigan
- Location: 2800 North Custer Road; Monroe, Michigan 48162
- Elevation AMSL: 616 ft (188 m)
- Coordinates: 41°55′58.8″N 83°26′9.6″W

Map
- Location of airport in Michigan TTF (the United States)

Runways
Direction	Length		Surface
Direction	ft	m	Surface
3/21	4,997	1,523	Asphalt

Statistics (2009)
- Aircraft operations: 12,000
- Based aircraft: 30
- Source: Federal Aviation Administration

Custer Airport (ICAO: KTTF, FAA LID: TTF), sometimes referred to as Monroe Custer Airport, is a city-owned public airport located in the city of Monroe in Monroe County, Michigan. The airport opened in November 1946 and was named for George Armstrong Custer, who spent much of his early life in Monroe. It is included in the Federal Aviation Administration (FAA) National Plan of Integrated Airport Systems for 2017–2021, in which it is categorized as a local general aviation facility.

Custer Airport is owned by the city of Monroe and is financially supported through hangar rentals, landing fees, and fuel sales. It is located on North Custer Road (formerly designated as M-130) about two miles (3.2 km) northwest of Monroe's downtown area. The airport property itself—occupying 158 acres (64 hectares)—is an exclave of the city limits and is separated by a one-quarter mile (0.4 km) wide undeveloped residential area belonging to Frenchtown Charter Township. Since the city owns the airport, the area it occupies was incorporated into the city limits. Munson Park, the largest public recreation park in Monroe, occupies the land immediately east of the airport. The River Raisin is just south of the airport, and farmland surrounds the airport to the west and north.

== Facilities and aircraft ==
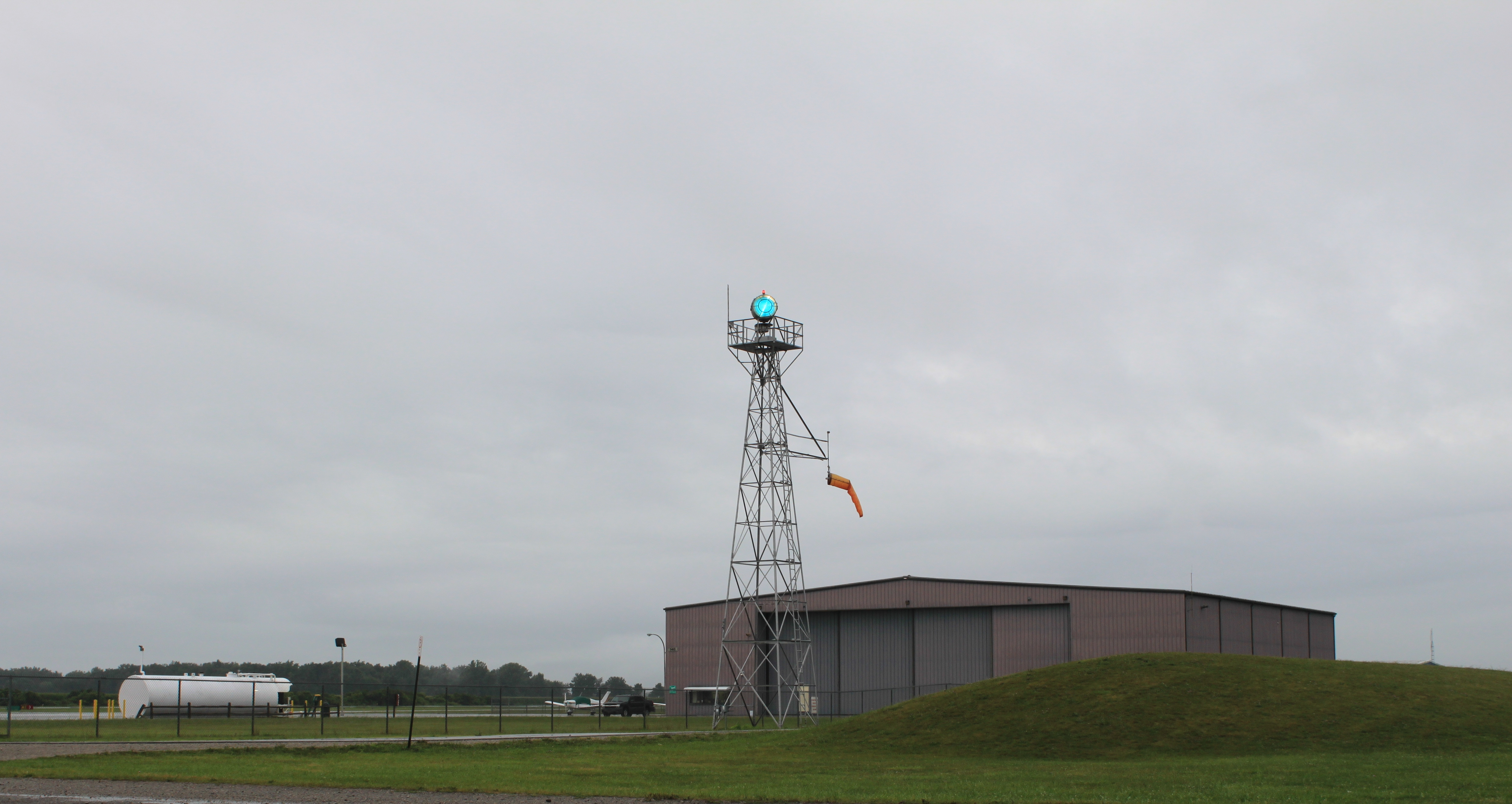
Light beacon, hangar, and tarmac

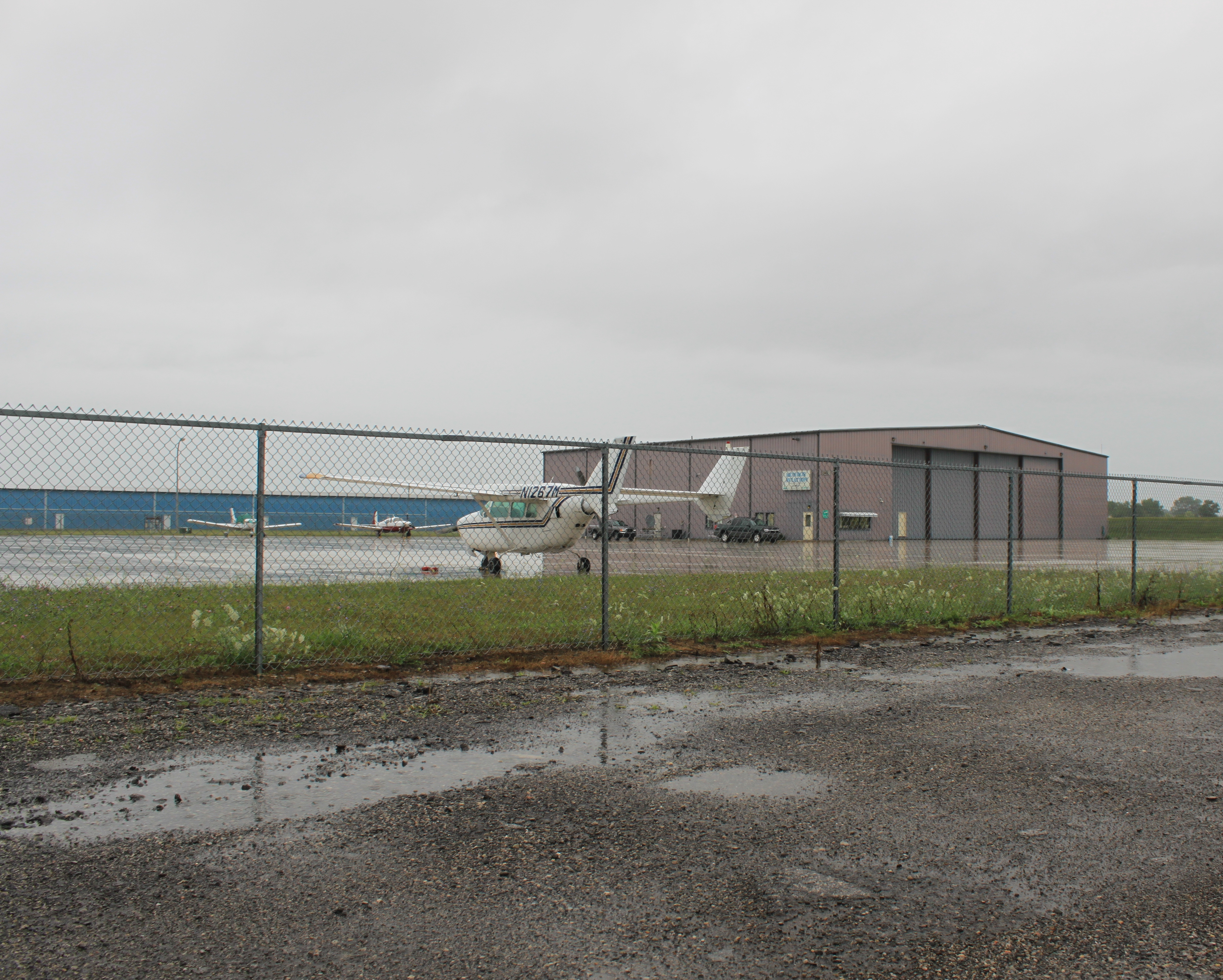
Tarmac and hangar/terminal

The airport has one 4,997 by 100 feet (1,523 by 30 metres) asphalt runway (designated as runway 3/21) with a full-length taxiway. Both are illuminated with high intensity lighting; runway 21 has runway end identifiers (REILS) and both runways have visual approach slope indicators (VASI).

The airport has no regularly scheduled flights or arrivals. As a general aviation airport, it is mainly used by private pilots for personal and business use, as well as a variety of chartered aircraft bringing people in to do business in Monroe County. Custer Airport is able to accommodate a large variety of aircraft, including single engine aircraft, twin engine aircraft, and business jets such as the Cessna Citation and Learjet. The airport has personal hangars that house approximately 45 airplanes and a large hangar that houses several corporate aircraft as well as the Monroe Aviation School of Flight and Monroe Aviation Aircraft Maintenance. In addition, a Michigan Civil Air Patrol aircraft is stationed at the airport. The Monroe County Sheriff Department maintains hangars for its helicopter operations.

The airport has 100LL fuel available 24 hours through self-serve as well as full-service Jet-A fuel. The airport's fixed-base operator offers general maintenance, aircraft parking, courtesy transportation, rental cars, a crew lounge, and more.

The airport operates continuously and is staffed from 8:00 AM–5:00 PM with after-hours services available through prior arrangement. Custer Airport has no control tower, and instrument traffic is handled by the Cleveland Air Route Traffic Control Center (ZOB) in coordination with the Detroit Approach and Departure Control. The nearest neighboring airports that can accommodate flights from Custer Airport are Lenawee County Airport to the west, Toledo Suburban Airport to the southwest, and Grosse Ile Municipal Airport to the north. Detroit Metropolitan Wayne County Airport and Toledo Express Airport are within close proximity and are used regularly by pilots departing Monroe for both business and training purposes.

For the 12-month period ending December 31, 2021, the airport had 12,000 aircraft operations, an average of 33 per day. It was composed entirely of general aviation. For the same time period, there were 30 aircraft based at the airport, all airplanes: 27 single-engine and 3 multi-engine.

=== Security concerns ===
Following the September 11 attacks in 2001, local concerns were raised that Custer Airport could be shut down by government intervention because of the airport's close proximity to a nuclear power plant. Custer Airport is located approximately 9.5 miles (15.3 km) from the Enrico Fermi Nuclear Generating Station in neighboring Frenchtown Charter Township. It was proposed that airports within 10 miles (16 km) of a nuclear power plant be shut down until tighter security policies and government mandates could be enacted by both the airports and nuclear power plants. Custer Airport was ultimately not affected and experienced no changes in security procedures or operations, because security was deemed more than adequate at the small airport.

== Airshow ==
The airport hosts an annual airshow called the Wings and Wheels. Vintage cars and aircraft from the Yankee Air Museum are displayed on the airport's property for visitors.

== Accidents and incidents ==
- On July 4, 2002, a Beech A23 Bonanza sustained substantial damage when the nose landing gear collapsed during landing on runway 03 at the Custer Airport. The pilot reported that he was practicing takeoffs and landings when, on the fourth landing, he flared too high and bounced. The airplane then went off the right side of the runway, where "the nosewheel dug into the terrain causing it to collapse and the airplane to go nose down."
- On March 29, 2011, a Piper Malibu airplane crashed in a soccer field in neighboring Munson Park. The airplane departed from Toledo Suburban Airport earlier that day and traveled about 300 miles (480 km) southeast to Bedford County Airport in Pennsylvania. The airplane then departed back to Michigan to land at Custer Airport. However, as it approached the airport, it circled low to the ground and crashed in Munson Park, exploding upon impact and killed all three people on board. Subsequent investigations by the National Transportation Safety Board (NTSB) revealed no mechanical failures. Postmodern toxicology performed on the pilot showed the presence of hydrocodone and dihydrocodeine, and the NTSB concluded that the accident was caused by the pilot showing poor judgement by attempting a high-speed turnaround over the runway, subsequently failing to maintain clearance to the runway.
- On December 21, 2017, a Cessna 172 Skyhawk crashed during a touch-and-go landing at Custer. The flight instructor reported that the student pilot began to flare for touchdown when a wind gust yawed the airplane to the left. He added that the wind "dropped out," and the airplane landed hard with the nose low, which resulted in a nose landing gear collapse. The probable cause was found to be the student pilot’s improper yaw control during the landing flare and the flight instructor’s failure to take remedial action, which resulted in a hard landing.

== See also ==
- List of airports in Michigan
