= Saint Michael the Archangel Church (Monroe, Michigan) =

Coordinates: 41°55′04″N 83°24′16″W

St. Michael Church
- Saint Michael the Archangel Catholic Church
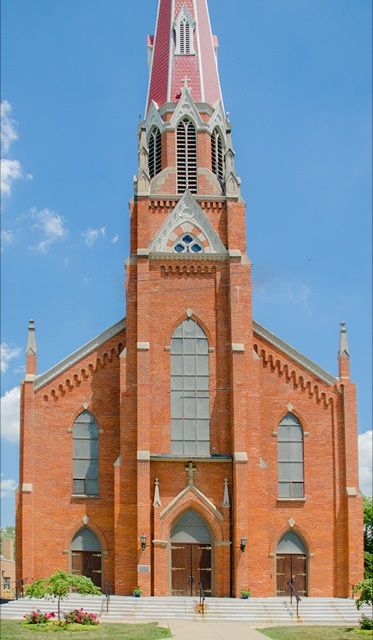
- Exterior of St. Michael Church facing north on W Front Street
- St. Michael Church
- Location: Monroe, Michigan, United States
- Denomination: Roman Catholic
- Website: www.stmichaelmonroe.com

History
- Founded: September 29, 1852
- Consecrated: October 1867 (present church)

Architecture
- Architectural type: Gothic
- Years built: 1866–1867 (present church)
- Groundbreaking: June 12, 1866 (present church)

Specifications
- Height: 183 feet (steeple)

Administration
- Archdiocese: Detroit

Clergy
- Pastor(s): Rev. Kishore Babu Battu, SAC

Saint Michael the Archangel Church (St. Michael Church) is located on the west side of the city of Monroe, Michigan, along the River Raisin and is a part of the Archdiocese of Detroit. Its congregants include over 1,000 registered families. It was founded in 1852. Its current pastor is Rev. Kishore Battu, who has been serving the St. Michael community since August 1, 2020.

== History ==
Monroe already had a Catholic parish when St. Michael's was founded, but because the members of the existing church were predominately Francophone, in 1852 the German-speaking immigrant families asked bishop Peter Paul Lefevre for a new parish and their request was approved.

The present building was built from 1866 to 1867. When the parish was first established, the mayor of Monroe palatial residence was remodeled as a temporary church. It was used as a church on the first floor and on the second it was used for the school. Later it would only be used as St. Michael School. Then, in 1866, the cornerstone for the present church was laid. The large 187-foot steeple wasn't added until 1883. In 1874 the 3-story rectory was built east of the church. In 1918 the parish built the present building of St. Michael School which is now a part of Monroe Catholic Elementary Schools.

The movement to establish the parish started in 1845 by 14 German immigrants who wanted to hear sermons in their native language (masses were only in Latin prior to the Second Vatican Council ). The only nearby church was St. Mary of the Immaculate Conception right across the river where St. Michael stands today. St. Mary only had sermons in French and did preach to the German and Irish population growing in Monroe at that time. The German and Irish families were forced to move to the second floor of the rectory, named the St. Joseph Chapel, in order to be ministered with the language they were comfortable with. When the German families were able to acquire land they were “eager” to leave St. Mary to start a parish of their own (though the main reason for establishing this church was for language and cultural reasons, St. Michael would later abandon German all together at the onset of World War I). They first purchased an empty lot Humphrey Street but the plan was soon abandoned. Soon after, they purchased the first mayor of Monroe's estate to build the church and it remains the current site of the church.

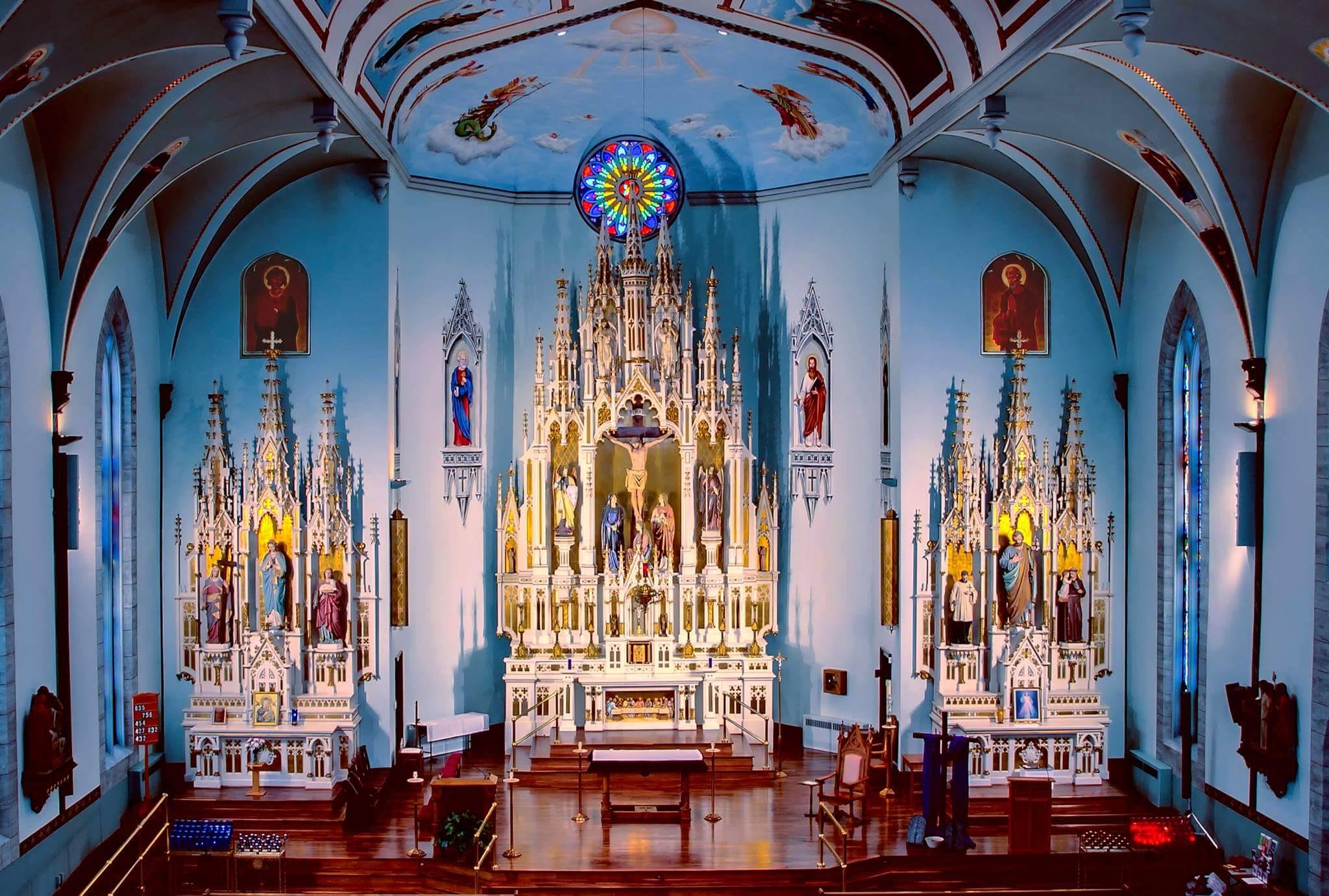
Inside of St. Michael's looking towards the three altars from the choir loft.

The inside of the church consists of numerous paintings and statues. The almost life size stations of the cross inside of the church were added into the church in the summer of 1923 when artisan Matthew Ising was paid to decorate St. Michael's. The original stained glass windows were donated at $100 each. The last remaining stained glass window from when the church was first built is the rose widow above the altar. The present windows were installed in the 1940s. A replacement value of $971,388 was estimated for the stained glass windows in 2015. St. Michael's has three breathtaking altars. There is an altar dedicated to Mary and Joseph and the main altar. Rev. Stephen Rooney (pastor 1995–2008) had the church repainted and remodeled in the late 1990s and the paintings were made to represent how the church once looked in the late 1800s. The three altars were painted, the wall in the middle of the choir loft that covered the stained glass window in the middle of the south end of the church was removed giving off more light, and organ was fixed and replaced. Hardwood floors were also added in the sanctuary and replaced the carpet that was there. In the main altar there are other statues besides the crucifix. They were added in the late 1990s to match the look of how the altar look before the original statues were removed. The original statues were removed in the late 1940s because the altar was leaning forward causing an angel at the top to lose its balance and fall nearly hitting Rev. Bernard C. Loeher (pastor 1947–1949) who was saying mass.They were taken to the basement and then removed from the basement in the 1970s. It is rumored the statues were taken to the city dump for disposal. For years the altar was empty until the late 1990s. The east entrance was also added in the 1980s when the church was being "touched up." The original cost of the church including the large steeple and bells was about $40,000. In 2002 St. Michael's celebrated their 150th anniversary. A book was dedicated to the 150-year history of the church titled Partners in Faith: 150 Years of Saint Michael the Archangel Catholic Church written by Michael G. Roehrig.

== Parochial School ==
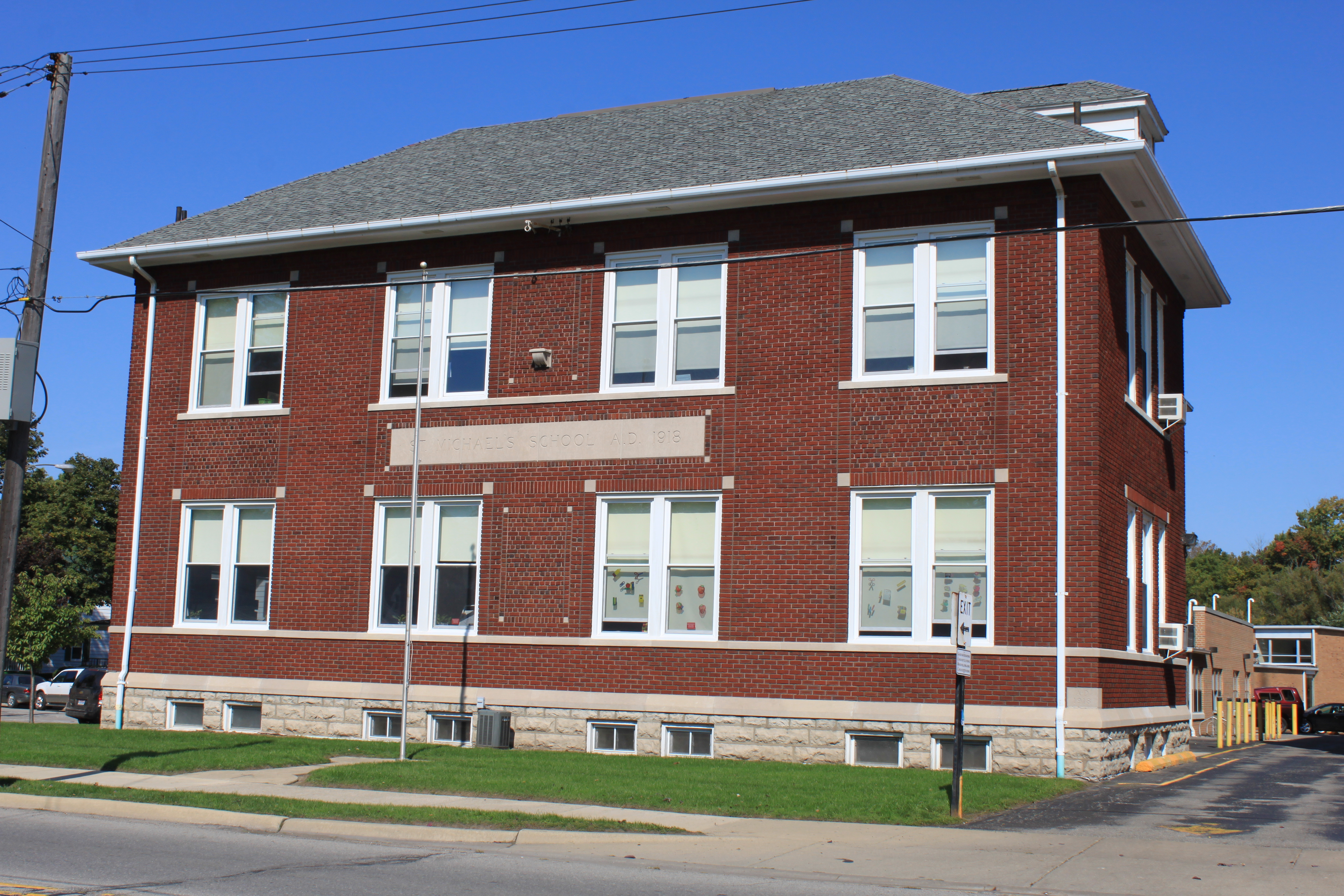
Front of the original section of St. Michael School built in 1918, now a part of Monroe Catholic Elementary Schools.

From the founding of St. Michael in 1852, two rooms in the Harleston House (the temporary church) were set aside as school rooms for boys and on the first Sunday of Lent, February 25, 1855, Sister Aloysius Walter, I.H.M., began religious instructions for girls. Sister Aloysius was one of the first members of Sisters, Servants of the Immaculate Heart of Mary (IHM), founded in 1845 by Fr. Louis Gillet. Sister Aloysius started a regular school for girls on April 16, 1855. St. Michael the Archangel was the first mission of the I.H.M. community outside of St. Mary's parish. In 1867 upon completion of the present-day church, the Harleston House became St. Michael School. In 1918 the present school was built and two additions were later added one being in the late 1950s and the other being in the early 1960s. In 2011 Archbishop Allen Vigneron of Detroit proposed merging St. Michael the Archangel's parochial school with the schools affiliated with other Monroe parishes, St. John the Baptist and St. Mary School. In November 2011, it was announced that beginning in the 2012–2013 school year, the three parochial schools in the city of Monroe would merge to become one school named Monroe Catholic Elementary Schools (MCES). In August 2012, MCES began its inaugural year with St. Michael Early Elementary School Campus housing infants through first grade, St. John Elementary School Campus housing grades 2nd-4th, and St. Mary Middle School Campus began housing 5th-8th grade. In the 2021–2022 school year MCES celebrated its 10th school year since its founding in November 2011 and its opening in August 2012.

== Families of Parishes ==
On Pentecost 2020, Archbishop Allen Vigneron announced a new model for the parishes within the Archdiocese of Detroit. All parishes would be put into groups called Families of Parishes which consist of three to six parishes. This was done in order for parishes to work together to evangelize the church in Detroit. On December 9, 2020, it was announced that St. Michael Parish would be grouped with St. Mary Parish Monroe, St. John Parish Monroe, St. Anne Parish Monroe, and St. Charles Parish Newport. This family of parishes was titled “ Monroe Vicariate Family 2.” The Archbishop also announced that the Rev. David Burgard, pastor of St. Mary Monroe and St. John Monroe, would be appointed Moderator of the In Solidum team of priests who, with the other priests of the team, will lead the newly formed Monroe Vicariate Family 2.

== See also ==
- Gothic Revival architecture
