= Hall of the Divine Child =

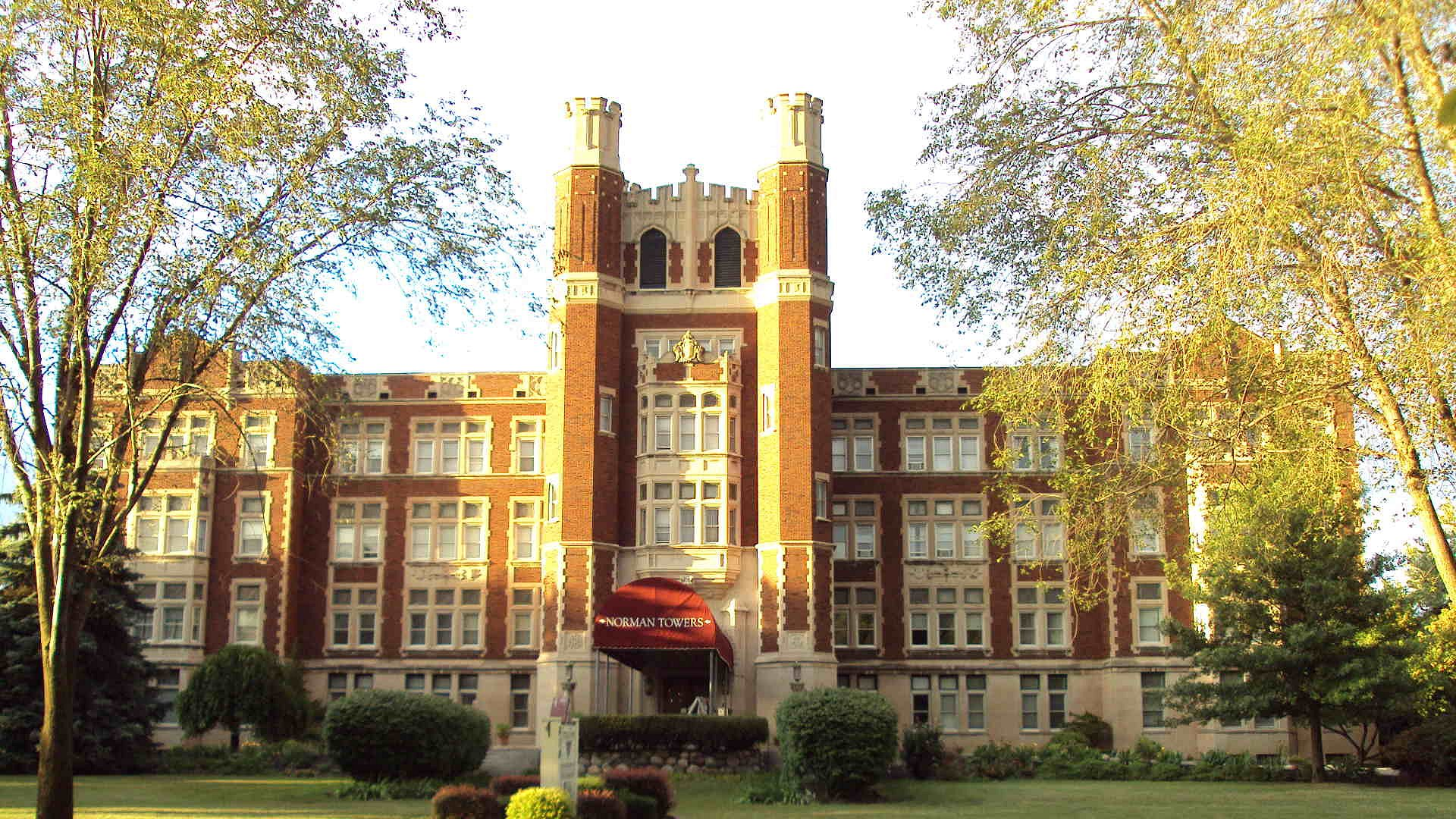

Location
- 810 West Elm Avenue; Monroe, Michigan 48162; 41°55′18″N 83°24′19″W

Information
- Denomination: Roman Catholic
- Founded: 1918
- Closed: 1980
- Ownership: Sisters, Servants of the IHM
- Hall of the Divine Child
- U.S. National Register of Historic Places
- Built: 1918
- Architect: Henry J. Rills
- NRHP reference No.: 100000885
- Added to NRHP: April 17, 2017

The Hall of the Divine Child was a boarding school in Monroe, Michigan serving kindergarten through eighth grades. It was built in 1918 and closed in 1980; the building turned into the "Norman Towers". It was entered onto the National Register of Historic Places in 2017.

== History ==
In 1915, Bishop John Samuel Foley asked the Sisters, Servants of the Immaculate Heart of Mary to construct a boys boarding school. Construction began that year, but World War I delayed the opening until 1918. The school opened in January of that year with 26 pupils. Attendees were primarily boarding students, but some day students attended.

Originally the school also housed grade 1-6 girls attending St Mary's Academy (now St. Mary Catholic Central High School). In 1932, the girls were moved to a new facility, and Hall of the Divine Child began offering high school classes. In 1936, the school became a military academy, and a regulation drill uniform was adopted in 1938. In 1941, with a waiting list to enter, the high school curriculum was dropped and the school returned to K-8 classes. Enrollment peaked in the mid-1950s at about 350 students. However, in the following years, enrollment declined and operational costs increased. The school closed in 1980.

In the early 1980s, the sisters sold the building to a limited partnership, which converted it to an apartment complex for older adults known as "Norman Towers." However, the sisters repossessed the building in the late 1990s, and resold it in 2005. As of 2017, a developer plans to renovate the structure.

== Description ==
The Hall of the Divine Child is a four-and-a-half-story, red brick, institutional building with limestone trim. The facade is dominated by a central castellated tower, which has battlements and turrets.
