= Port of Monroe =

Coordinates: 41.896°N 83.355°W

The Port of Monroe is Michigan's only port on Lake Erie. Located in Monroe, Michigan, it handles a variety of cargo and is a growing hub for multimodal transportation in the region, which includes water, rail, and road transport. The port is situated on the west shore of Lake Erie at the mouth of the River Raisin, and handles diverse cargo, including special bar quality (SBQ) steel, and has also focused on building supply chains for beneficial reuse materials. The port has received federal grants to construct a new terminal to handle container shipments, which are the most common shipment form globally. The Michigan Department of Environment, Great Lakes, and Energy awarded a $1 million Brownfield Redevelopment Grant to the Port to help redevelop its infrastructure with a second wharf and improve the turning basin. The Port of Monroe was the first partner in the Newlab-Michigan Central testing network, a project that enables the rapid testing of new technologies for logistics in real-world conditions.
