= Monroe, Michigan =

- City
- City of Monroe
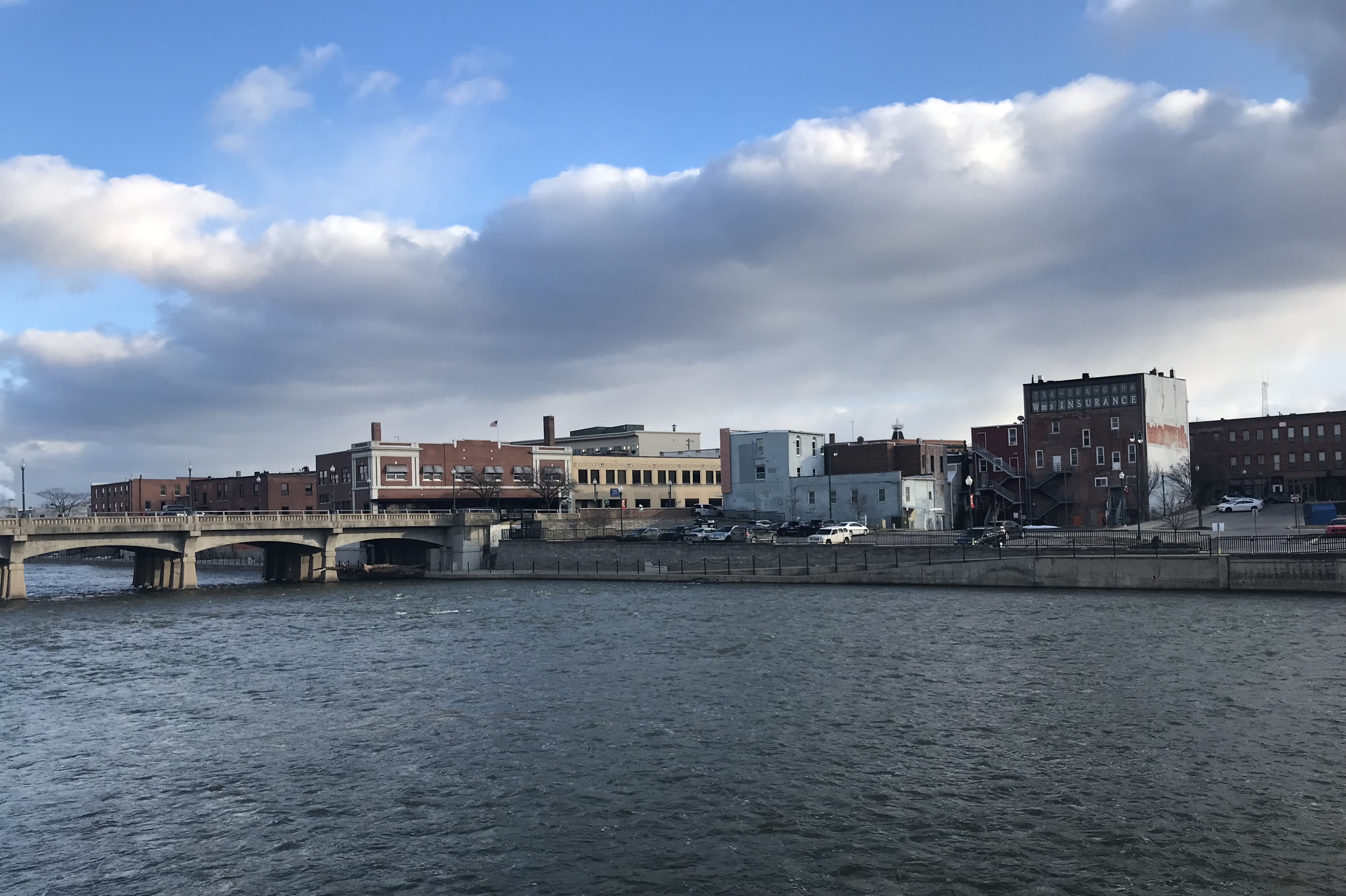
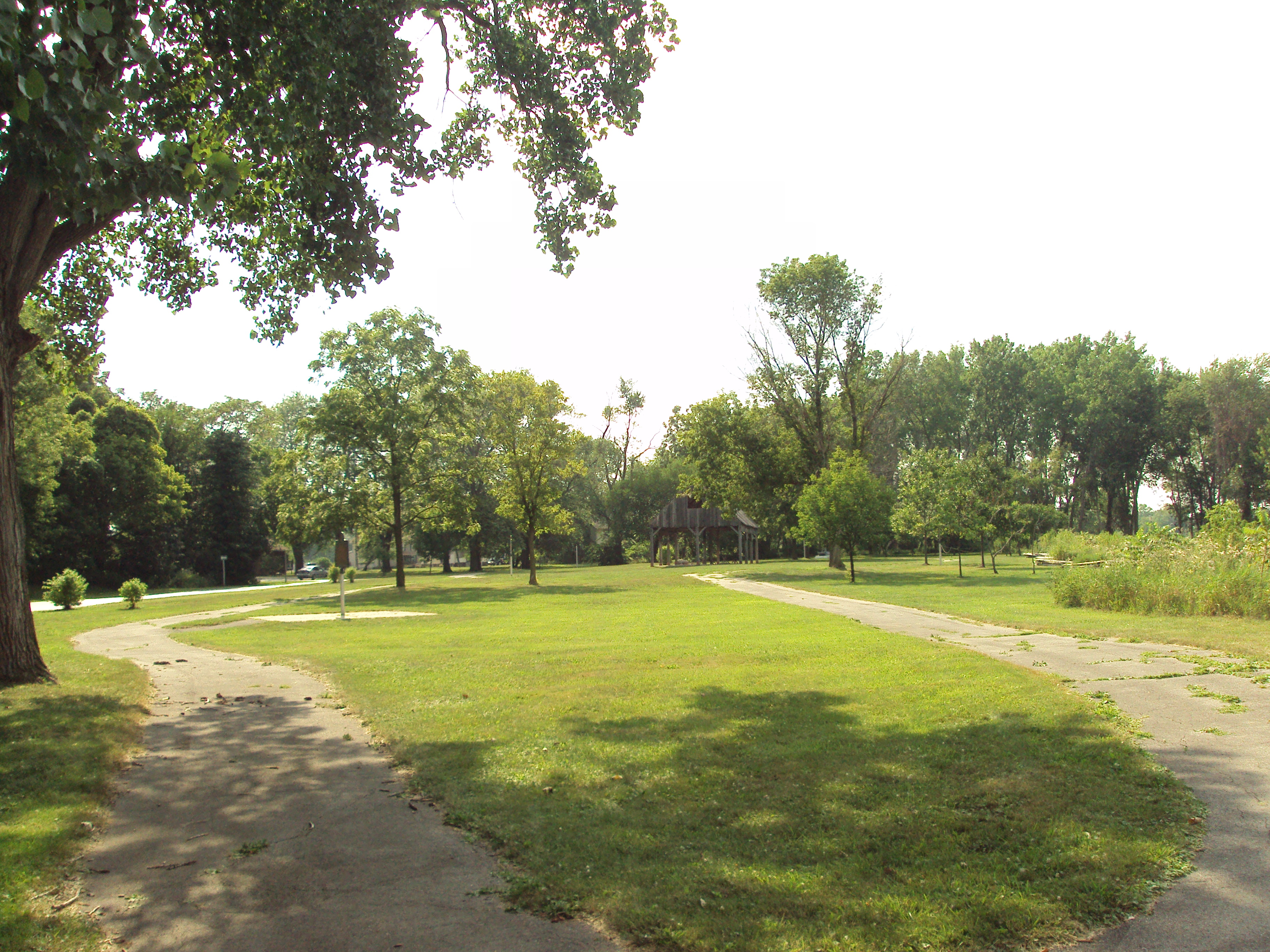
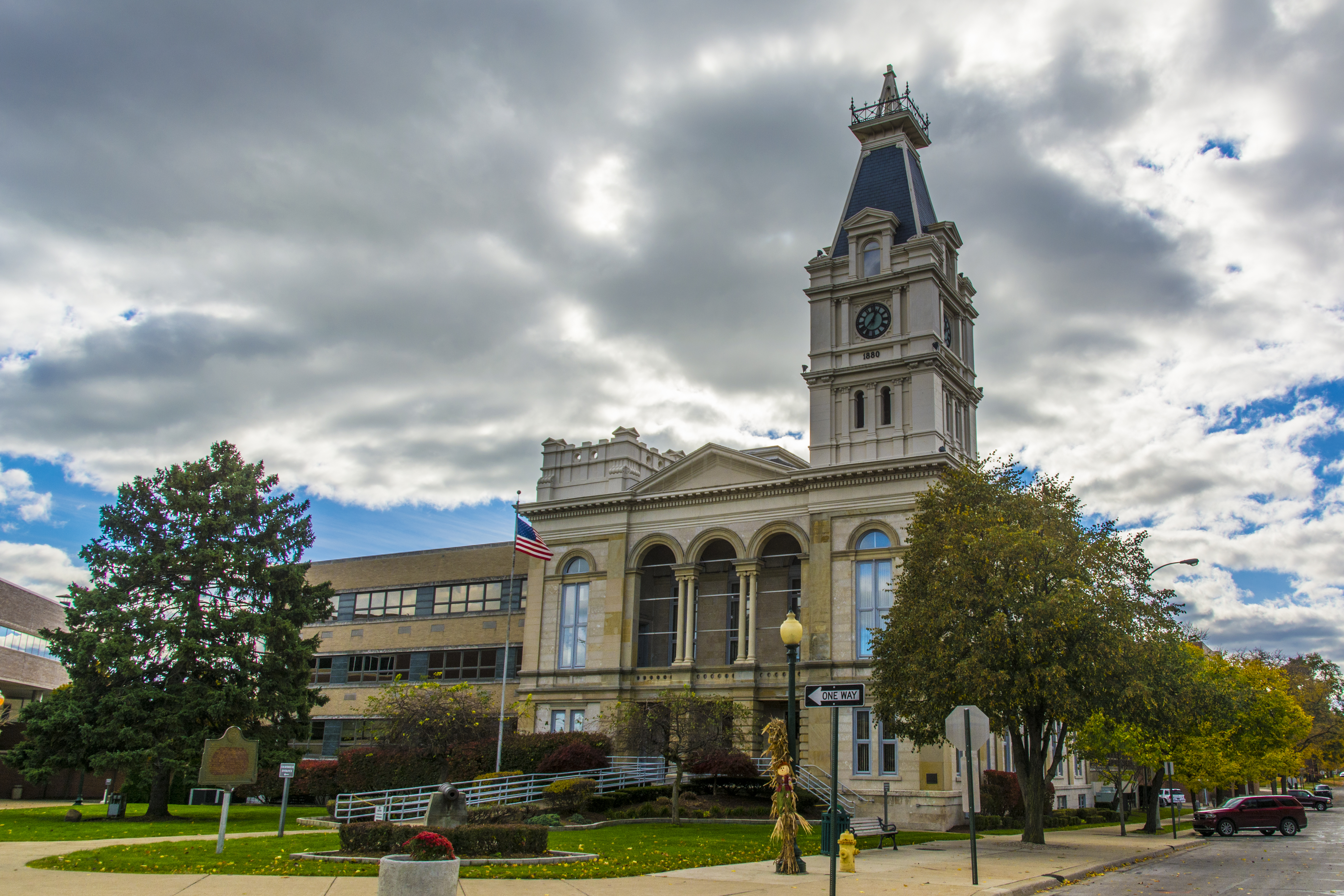
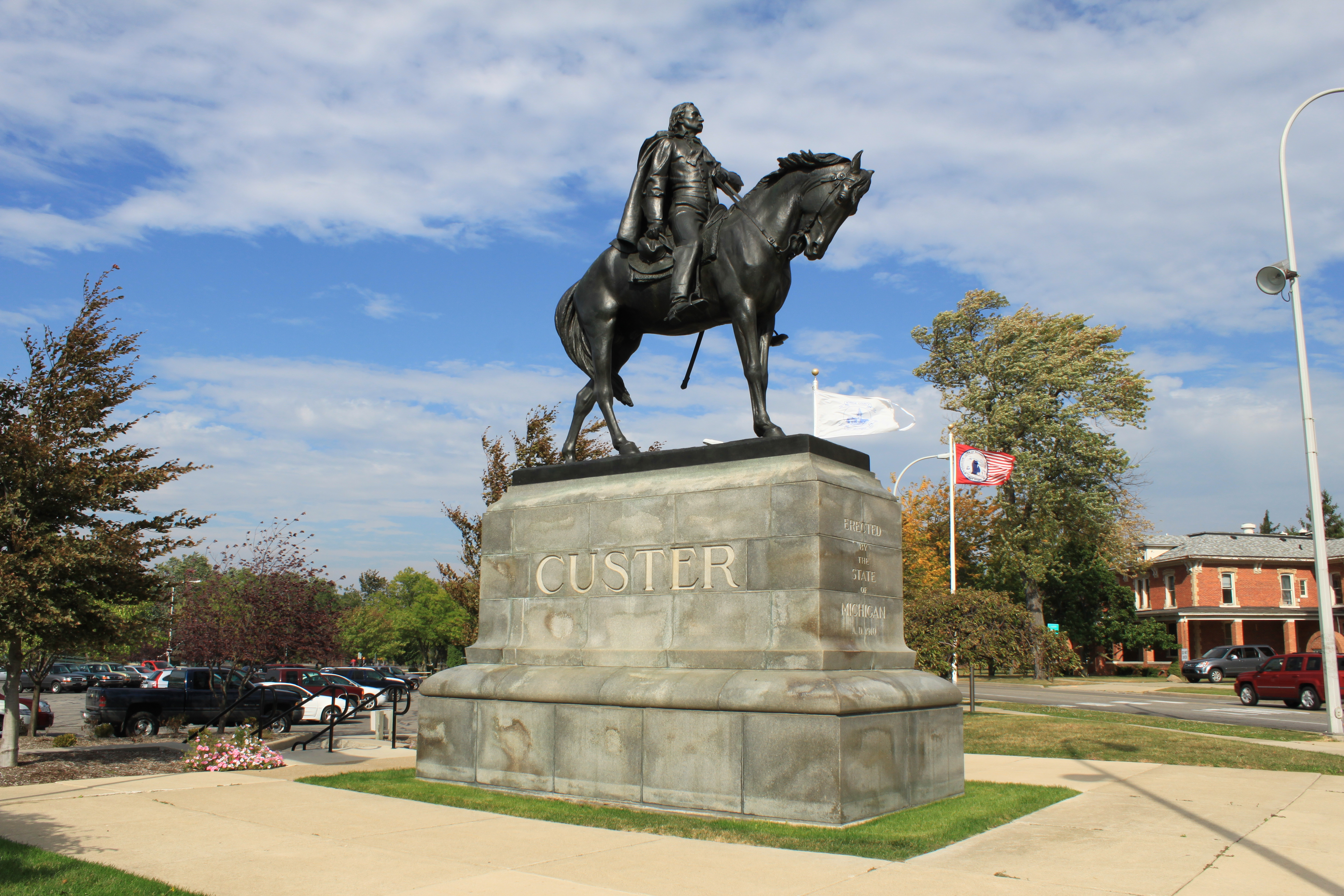
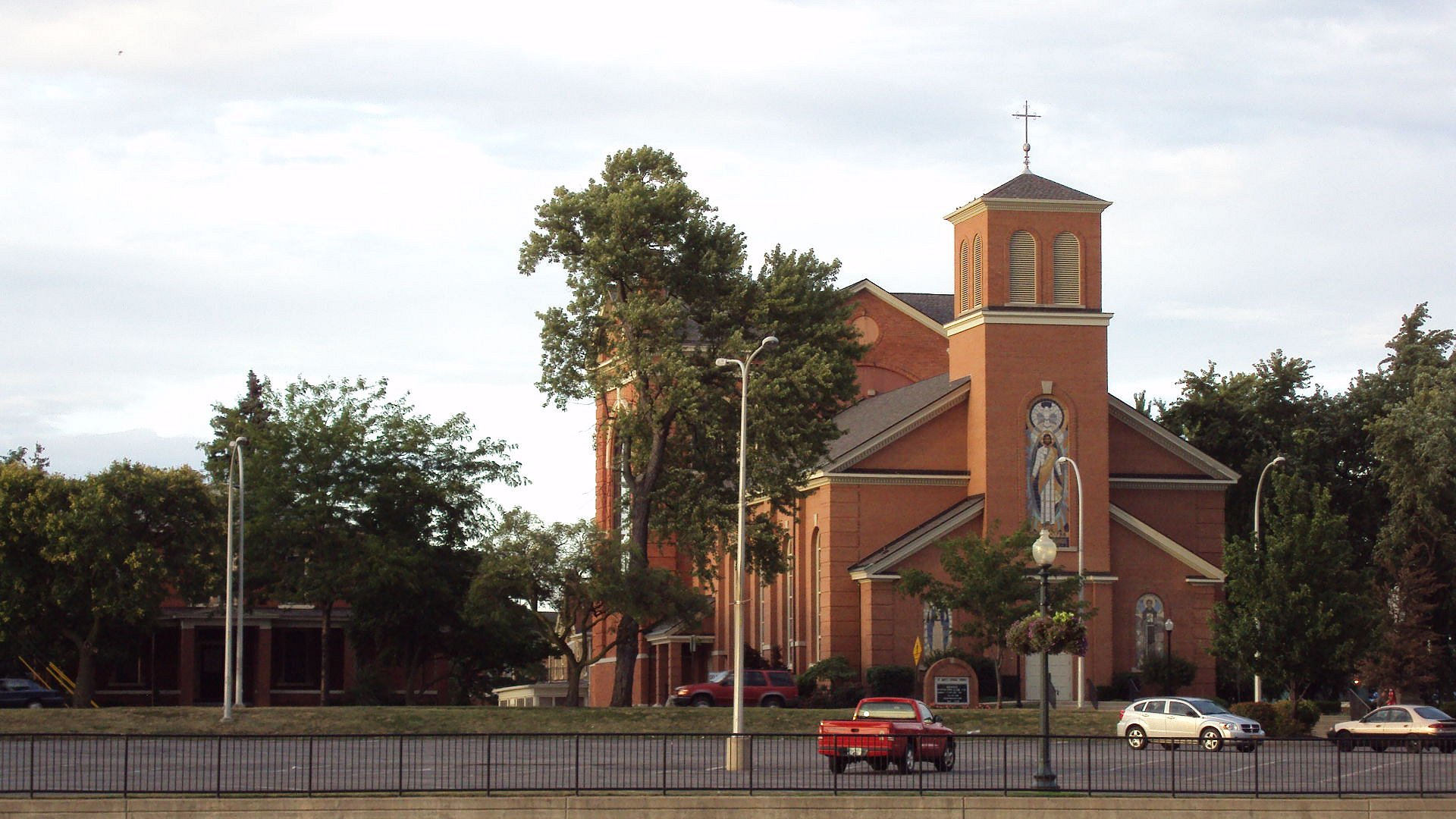
- Downtown Monroe along the River Raisin River Raisin National Battlefield Park Monroe County Courthouse Custer Equestrian Monument St. Mary's Church Complex

- Flag

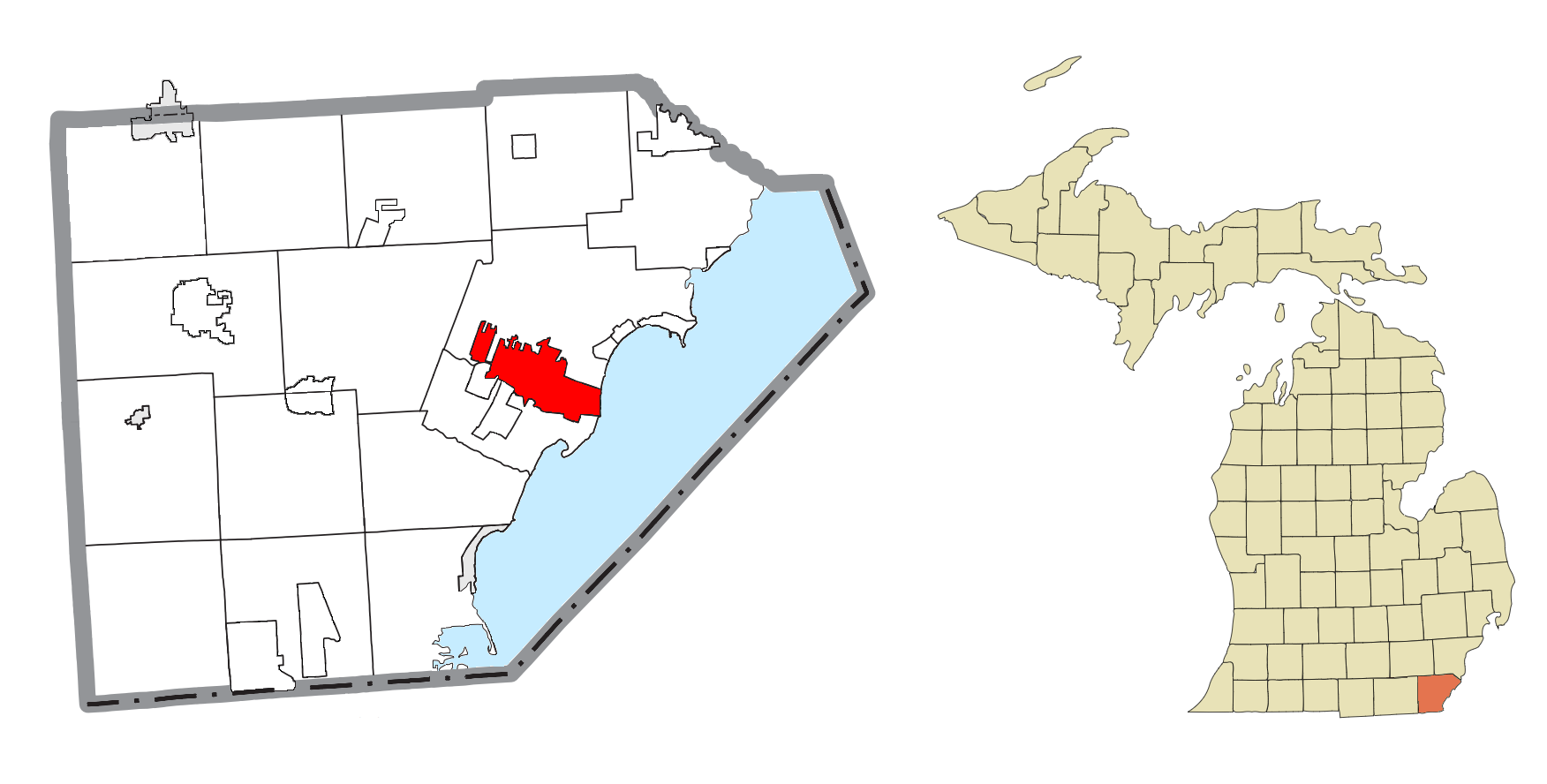
- Location within Monroe County

- Location within the state of Michigan Location within the United States
- Coordinates: 41°54′59″N 83°23′52″W
- Country: United States
- State: Michigan
- County: Monroe
- Settled: 1785
- Platted: 1817
- Incorporated: 1837

Government
  - Type: Council–manager
  - Mayor: Robert Clark
  - Manager: Vince Pastue
  - Clerk: Michelle LaVoy

Area
  - City: 10.22 sq mi (26.46 km^{2})
  - Land: 9.05 sq mi (23.43 km^{2})
  - Water: 1.17 sq mi (3.03 km^{2})
- Elevation: 597 ft (182 m)

Population (2020)
  - City: 20,462
  - Density: 2,261.9/sq mi (873.34/km^{2})
  - Urban: 51,240 (US: 490th)
  - Metro: 151,560 (US: 264th)
- Time zone: UTC-5 (Eastern (EST))
  - Summer (DST): UTC-4 (EDT)
- ZIP Codes: 48161, 48162
- Area code: 734
- FIPS code: 26-55020
- GNIS feature ID: 0632572
- Website: monroemi.gov

Monroe is the largest city in Monroe County, Michigan, United States, and its county seat. The population was 20,462 at the 2020 census. The city is bordered on the south by Monroe Charter Township, but the two are administered autonomously. Monroe is the core city in the Monroe metropolitan area, which is coterminous with Monroe County and had a population of 154,809 in 2020. On the western shores of Lake Erie about 20 miles (32 km) northeast of Toledo, Ohio, and 40 miles (64 km) southwest of Detroit, the city is part of the Detroit–Ann Arbor–Flint combined statistical area.

The Monroe area was the scene of several military conflicts during the War of 1812 against the United Kingdom and is known for the Battle of Frenchtown. In 1817, parts of the Frenchtown settlement along the River Raisin were platted and renamed "Monroe" after then-president James Monroe. When Michigan became a state in 1837, Monroe was incorporated as a city.

Monroe is known as the childhood residence of George Armstrong Custer and other members of his family, including his brother Boston Custer and wife Elizabeth Bacon. Several structures are named after Custer, including Custer Airport. Founded in 1928, La-Z-Boy's world headquarters are in Monroe.

== History ==
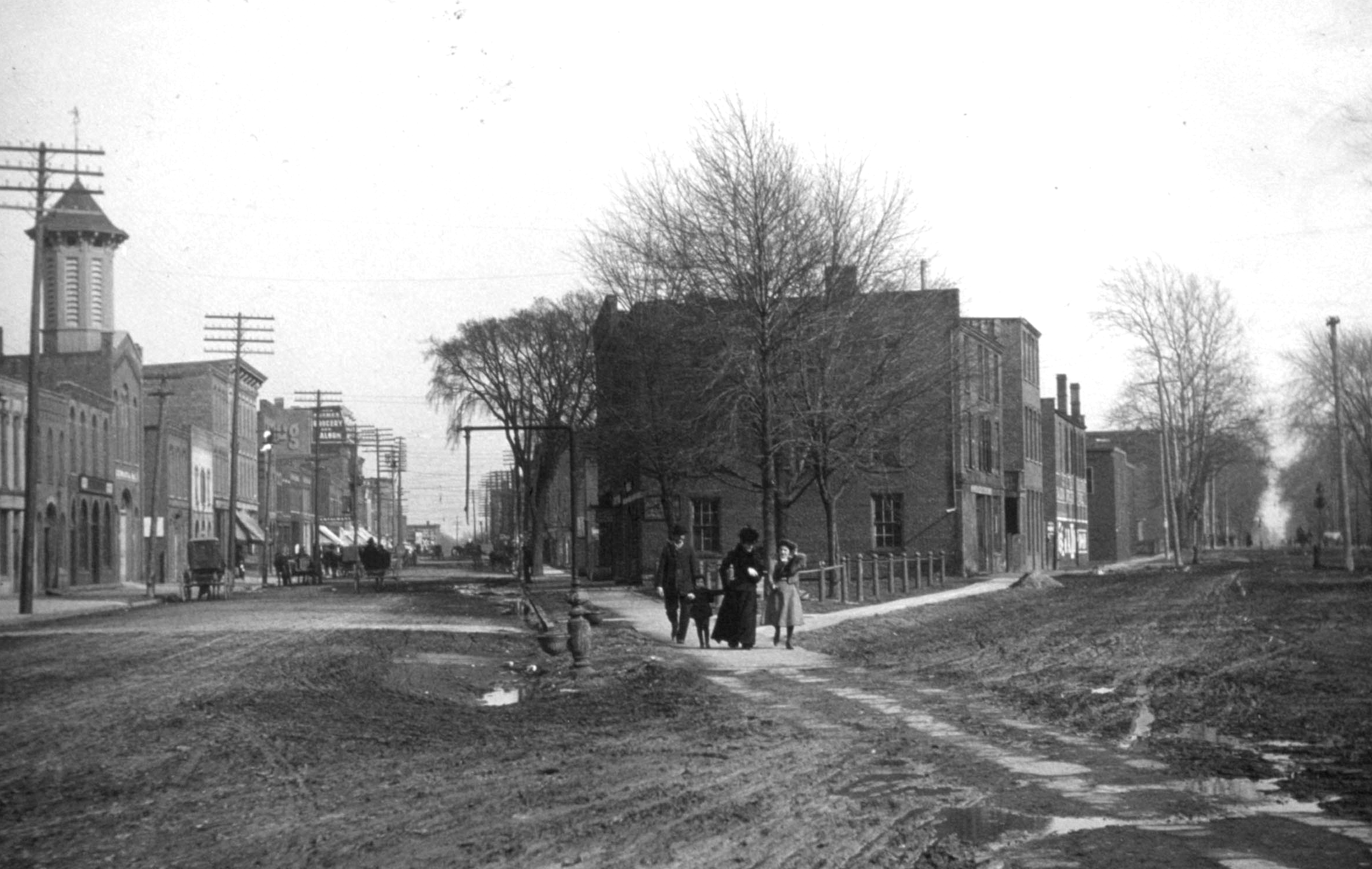
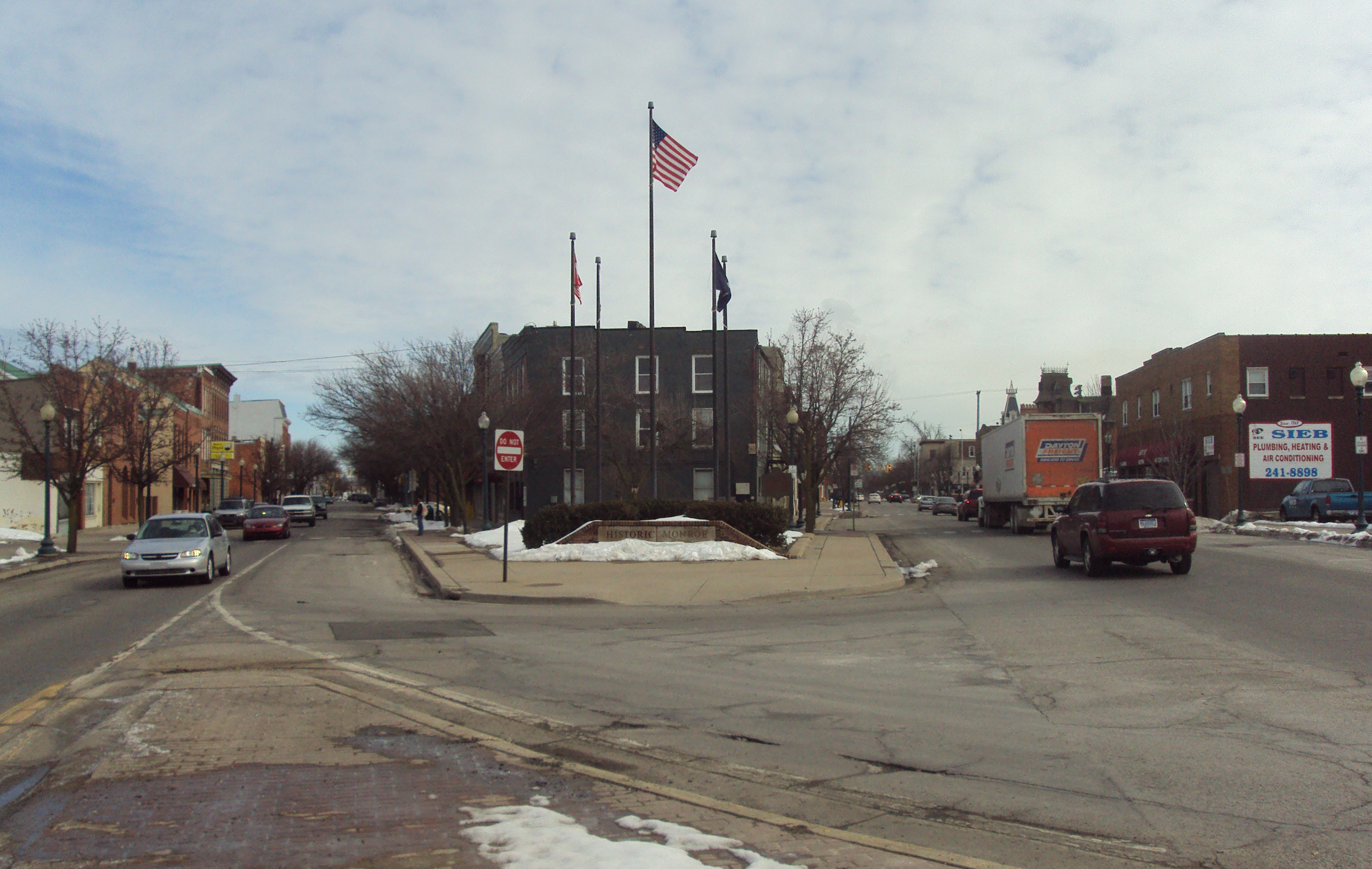
Front Street looking east toward the Old Village c. 1900 (top) and in 2010 (bottom)

Long occupied by varying cultures of indigenous peoples, the area around the River Raisin was settled by the Potawatomi hundreds of years before French explorers and colonists reached it in the late 17th century. Robert de LaSalle claimed the area for New France after his 1679 expedition on the Griffon.

In the 1780s, French-Canadian fur-trading families established a permanent settlement along the River Raisin known as Frenchtown. The Monroe County Museum preserves one of the earliest known artistic representations of a woman from this region and period (c. 1780) by Marie-Thérèse Lasselle.

In 1784, after the American Revolutionary War, the Potawatomi gave Francis Navarre of Canada some land south of the River Raisin. Shortly thereafter, Colonists settled Frenchtown, the third European community in what became the state of Michigan. Around the same time, French-Canadian Joseph Porlier Benec established the Sandy Creek Settlement just north of Frenchtown.

Self-portrait of Marie-Thérèse Lasselle (c. 1780), an early French-Canadian resident of the River Raisin settlement, housed at the Monroe County Museum.

Because of its proximity to Detroit, the area was of strategic importance during the War of 1812, especially after Fort Detroit surrendered to the British in August 1812. American forces en route to retake Detroit camped in the River Raisin area in the winter of 1812–13. On January 18, 1813, 600 Kentucky militiamen and 100 French under the command of James Winchester forced 200 Native Americans and 63 Canadian militia to retreat north away from the river. This skirmish was later called the "First Battle of the River Raisin".

On January 22, 1813, a force of 800 Native Americans and 597 British, under Henry Proctor, surprised the force of 1,000 Americans and captured Frenchtown. Many of the American militia were inexperienced, ill-trained, and badly equipped. They suffered 397 killed and 547 captured. The British and their allies had only slight losses.

When the British left with their captives for Detroit, they left those Americans too wounded to walk in the homes of Frenchtown inhabitants under the guard of a small British detachment and Native American allies, including Potawatomi. The morning after the battle, other Native Americans returned to Frenchtown. They plundered and burned homes and killed and ritually scalped many of the remaining American captives, taking others as slaves. The official U.S. estimate of casualties in this aftermath include a dozen named individuals killed and up to 30 more who were likely killed. The British estimated six Americans were killed.

This event became known as the "River Raisin Massacre". It was also known as the Battle of Frenchtown (or the Second Battle of the River Raisin). Today, the site of the battle is preserved as River Raisin National Battlefield Park, authorized in 2009. It is the first and so far only national battlefield established for a solely War of 1812 site. It has a small visitor center.

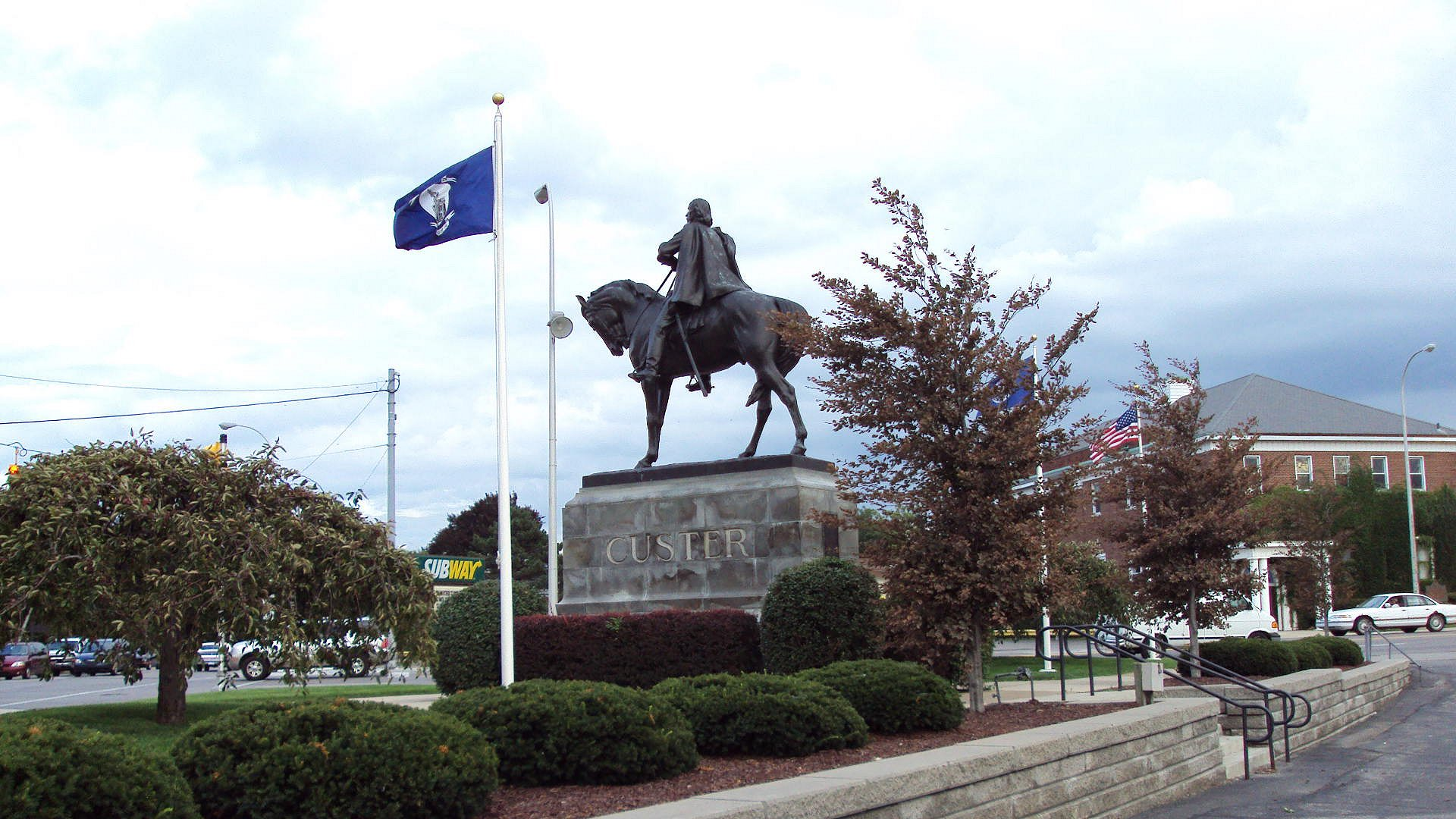
George Armstrong Custer's statue, unveiled in 1910, is located at the corner of Elm Avenue and Monroe Street.

Frenchtown was renamed after the War of 1812 and incorporated as the village of Monroe in honor of President James Monroe, who visited Michigan Territory in 1817. The same year, the city of Monroe was named the county seat of the newly created Monroe County. Monroe was reincorporated as a city in 1837.

Settled mostly by American migrants from New York and New England, Monroe became associated with events in the West in the later 19th century, particularly the Indian Wars. It was the childhood home of George Armstrong Custer, who had a military career in which he reached the rank of major general. His family moved there when he was young, and he lived in Monroe for much of his childhood. There he met and in 1864 married Elizabeth Bacon. In the later 19th century, he led troops in the Indian Wars and died at the Battle of the Little Bighorn, in which his forces were killed by the Lakota, who call it the Battle of the Greasy Grass.

In 1910, President William Howard Taft and Elizabeth Bacon Custer unveiled an equestrian statue of Custer, which now stands at the corner of Elm Avenue and Monroe Street. Custer is also honored in street names, various historic markers, buildings, schools, and the regional Custer Airport. City limit signs for Monroe call it "the home of General Custer."

The La-Z-Boy furniture company, known for its recliners, was founded in Monroe in 1927. Its world headquarters is in Monroe, south of the intersection of La-Z-Boy Boulevard and Stewart Road. The facility is roughly half a mile east of the original location on Telegraph Road; the old building was demolished in 2021, and the site is being redeveloped.

The Monroe Power Plant opened in 1974. It is the third largest coal-fired plant in the United States, with a capacity of 3,280 megawatts. At 805 feet (245 m) tall, the dual smokestacks are visible from more than 25 miles (40 km) away and are among the state's tallest structures.

In December 1989, a combination of zebra mussels and ice clogged the sole intake pipe of the Monroe water treatment plant, forcing a two-day shutdown of the city's schools, industries, and businesses.

== Geography ==
Monroe is in eastern Monroe County, with its city limits extending southeast 3 miles (5 km) from downtown to Lake Erie. The city's average elevation is 594 feet (181 metres), decreasing to 571 feet (174 metres) at Lake Erie, which has the lowest elevation in Michigan. The Port of Monroe is the only Michigan port on Lake Erie, and Sterling State Park, partially within the city limits, is the only one of Michigan's 103 state parks on or near Lake Erie.

According to the U.S. Census Bureau, the city has an area of 10.21 square miles (26.44 km^{2}), of which 9.05 square miles (23.44 km^{2}) are land and 1.17 square miles (3.03 km^{2}), or 11.44%, are water. The River Raisin travels through the city; it is non-navigable because of several dams and other obstructions.

=== Climate ===
Monroe lies in the humid continental climate zone. It receives an average of 28.5 inches (72 cm) of snow a year — the lowest average snowfall for any large city in the state. July is the warmest month, with an average high temperature of 84 °F (29 °C), and January is the coldest, with an average low temperature of 16 °F (−9 °C). Monroe does not normally have extremely hot or cold temperatures, as its climate is moderated by the lake. On average, the temperature drops below 0 °F (−18 °C) only a couple of times per winter, and it is even rarer for the temperature to rise above 100 °F (38 °C) in the summer. The coldest recorded temperature was −21 °F (−29 °C) on February 5, 1918. The highest recorded temperature was 106 °F (41 °C) on July 24, 1934, with an equal temperature once recorded many years earlier.

Climate data for Monroe, Michigan
Month	Jan	Feb	Mar	Apr	May	Jun	Jul	Aug	Sep	Oct	Nov	Dec	Year
Record high °F (°C)	70 (21)	70 (21)	83 (28)	90 (32)	95 (35)	106 (41)	106 (41)	103 (39)	103 (39)	92 (33)	81 (27)	68 (20)	106 (41)
Mean daily maximum °F (°C)	31 (−1)	33 (1)	43 (6)	57 (14)	69 (21)	80 (27)	84 (29)	82 (28)	75 (24)	62 (17)	48 (9)	36 (2)	58 (15)
Mean daily minimum °F (°C)	16 (−9)	18 (−8)	27 (−3)	38 (3)	49 (9)	59 (15)	64 (18)	62 (17)	55 (13)	43 (6)	33 (1)	22 (−6)	41 (5)
Record low °F (°C)	−18 (−28)	−21 (−29)	−2 (−19)	11 (−12)	26 (−3)	35 (2)	35 (2)	38 (3)	27 (−3)	21 (−6)	1 (−17)	−12 (−24)	−21 (−29)
Average precipitation inches (mm)	1.6 (41)	1.7 (43)	2.6 (66)	3.0 (76)	3.1 (79)	3.5 (89)	3.1 (79)	3.2 (81)	3.0 (76)	2.3 (58)	2.8 (71)	2.8 (71)	32.7 (830)
Average snowfall inches (cm)	7.4 (19)	6.2 (16)	5.3 (13)	0.9 (2.3)	0 (0)	0 (0)	0 (0)	0 (0)	0 (0)	0 (0)	2.2 (5.6)	6.0 (15)	28 (70.9)

== Demographics ==
Historical population
Census	Pop.	Note	%±
1840	1,703		—
1850	2,813		65.2%
1860	3,892		38.4%
1870	5,086		30.7%
1880	4,930		−3.1%
1890	5,258		6.7%
1900	5,043		−4.1%
1910	6,893		36.7%
1920	11,573		67.9%
1930	18,110		56.5%
1940	18,478		2.0%
1950	21,467		16.2%
1960	22,968		7.0%
1970	23,894		4.0%
1980	23,531		−1.5%
1990	22,625		−3.9%
2000	22,076		−2.4%
2010	20,733		−6.1%
2020	20,462		−1.3%
U.S. Decennial Census; 2018 Estimate

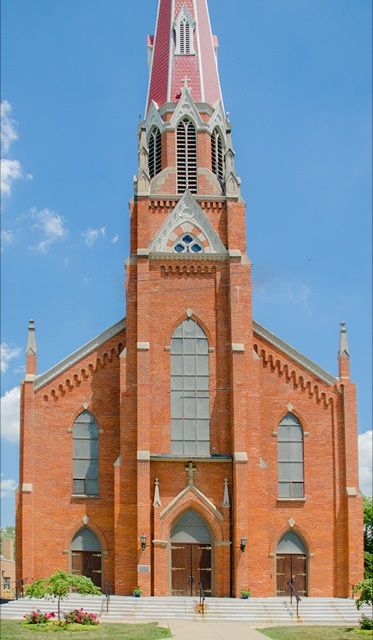
St. Michael the Archangel Church

=== 2020 census ===
As of the 2020 census, Monroe had a population of 20,462. The median age was 38.1 years. 23.1% of residents were under the age of 18 and 16.2% of residents were 65 years of age or older. For every 100 females there were 94.0 males, and for every 100 females age 18 and over there were 90.5 males age 18 and over.

100.0% of residents lived in urban areas, while 0.0% lived in rural areas.

There were 8,410 households in Monroe, of which 28.8% had children under the age of 18 living in them. Of all households, 36.9% were married-couple households, 21.2% were households with a male householder and no spouse or partner present, and 33.4% were households with a female householder and no spouse or partner present. About 34.2% of all households were made up of individuals and 12.4% had someone living alone who was 65 years of age or older.

There were 8,999 housing units, of which 6.5% were vacant. The homeowner vacancy rate was 1.9% and the rental vacancy rate was 5.3%.

Racial composition as of the 2020 census
Race	Number	Percentage
White	16,488	80.6%
Black or African American	1,604	7.8%
American Indian and Alaska Native	115	0.6%
Asian	164	0.8%
Native Hawaiian and Other Pacific Islander	5	0.0%
Some other race	380	1.9%
Two or more races	1,706	8.3%
Hispanic or Latino (of any race)	1,120	5.5%

=== 2010 census ===
As of the census of 2010, there were 20,733 people, 8,238 households, and 5,277 families residing in the city. The population density was 2,261.0 inhabitants per square mile (873.0/km^{2}). There were 9,158 housing units at an average density of 998.7 per square mile (385.6/km^{2}). The racial makeup of the city was 88.4% White, 6.2% African American, 0.4% Native American, 0.7% Asian, 1.2% from other races, and 3.0% from two or more races. Hispanic or Latino of any race were 4.1% of the population.

There were 8,238 households, of which 34.7% had children under the age of 18 living with them, 41.7% were married couples living together, 17.1% had a female householder with no husband present, 5.3% had a male householder with no wife present, and 35.9% were non-families. 30.6% of all households were made up of individuals, and 10.9% had someone living alone who was 65 years of age or older. The average household size was 2.44 and the average family size was 3.05.

The median age in the city was 36.3 years. 26.2% of residents were under the age of 18; 9% were between the ages of 18 and 24; 25.9% were from 25 to 44; 25.4% were from 45 to 64; and 13.3% were 65 years of age or older. The gender makeup of the city was 47.0% male and 53.0% female.

=== 2000 census ===
In the census of 2000, there were 22,076 people, 8,594 households, and 5,586 families in the city. The population density was 2,440.9 inhabitants per square mile (942.4/km^{2}). There were 9,107 housing units at an average density of 1,007.0 per square mile (388.8/km^{2}). The racial makeup was 90.87% White, 5.07% African American, 0.24% Native American, 0.84% Asian, 0.02% Pacific Islander, 0.90% from other races, and 2.06% from two or more races. Hispanic or Latino of any race were 2.76% of the population.

There were 8,594 households, of which 33.6% had children under 18 living with them, 46.6% were married couples living together, 14.3% had a female householder with no husband present, and 35.0% were non-families. 30.7% of all households were made up of individuals, and 12.7% had someone living alone 65 years or older. The average household size was 2.47 and the average family size 3.10.

In the city, the population was 26.9% under 18, 8.7% from 18 to 24, 29.3% from 25 to 44, 20.1% from 45 to 64, and 15.0% who 65 or older. The median age was 35 years. For every 100 females, there were 90.2 males. For every 100 females age 18 and over, there were 85.2 males.

The median income for a household in the city was $41,810, and the median income for a family $51,442. Males had a median income of $42,881 versus $25,816 for females. The per capita income for the city was $19,948. 9.0% of families and 12.6% of the population were below the poverty line, including 15.0% of those under 18 and 16.1% of those 65 or over.

== Economy ==
=== Top employers ===
According to the city's 2010 Comprehensive Annual Financial Report, its top employers are:

#	Employer	# of Employees
1	ProMedica Regional Hospital Monroe (formerly Mercy Memorial Hospital)	1,600
2	County of Monroe	1,062
3	DTE Energy	530
4	La-Z-Boy	522
5	Gerdau Macsteel	450
6	Monroe Bank & Trust	401
7	Sisters, Servants of the Immaculate Heart of Mary	265
8	City of Monroe	205
9	Monroe Publishing Company	200
10	SYGMA Network	162

== Sports ==
Monroe is the hometown of the Southern Michigan Timberwolves, a semi-professional football team that competes in the Great Lakes Football League. The Timberwolves have won a league championship four times, three in the Mid-Continental Football League (1996, 1997, and 1999), and the Minor League Football Alliance championship in 2016.

== Education ==
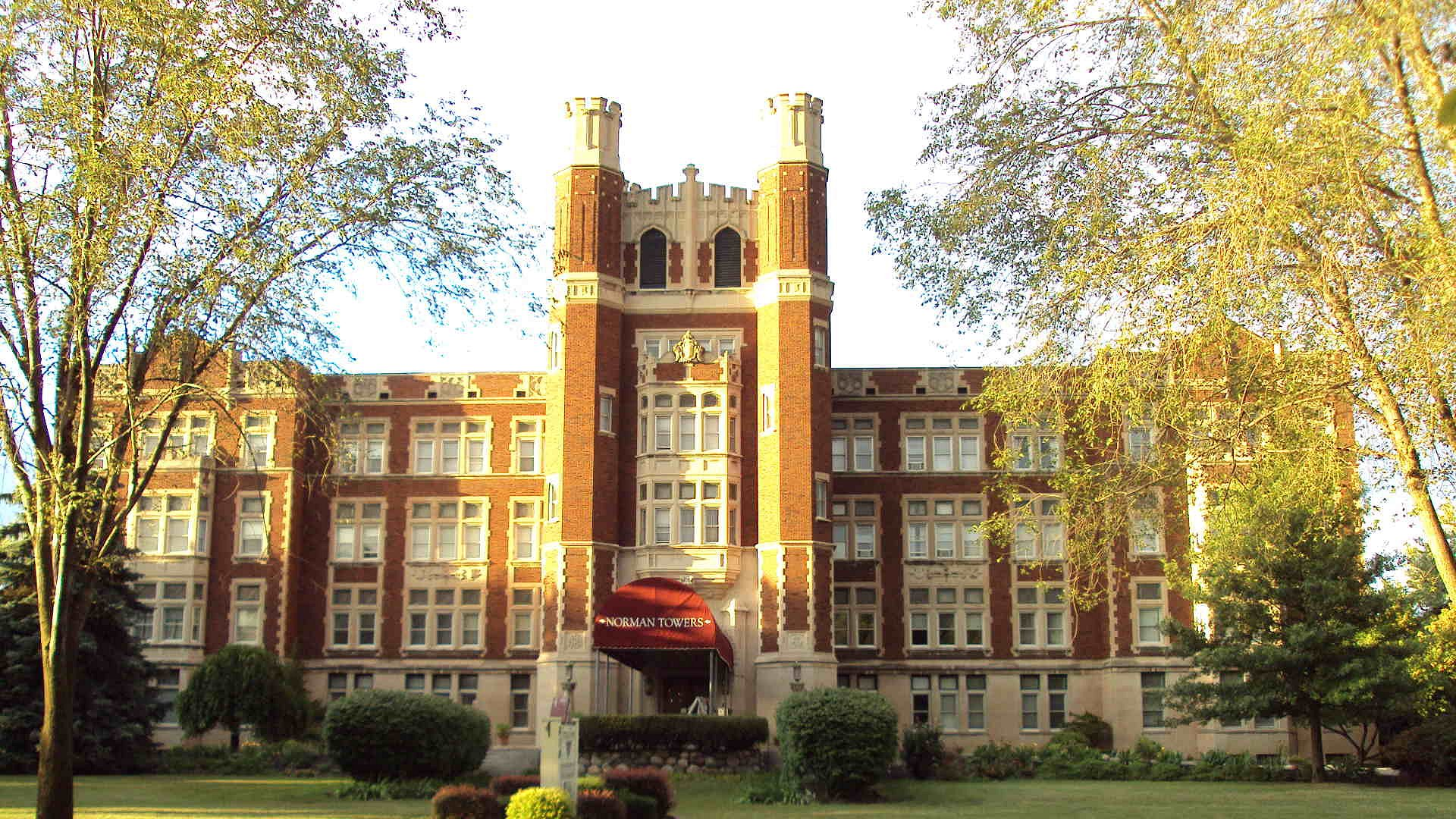
The Hall of the Divine Child, now the Norman Towers senior citizens residence, was a boarding school in Monroe from 1918 to 1980.

Monroe is served by Monroe Public Schools (MPS), which enrolls about 6,700 students. MPS operates five elementary schools, a middle school, a high school, an alternative high school, and two specialized education centers. At around 2,100 students, Monroe High School is one of the state's largest high schools. Monroe is also served by the Monroe County Intermediate School District, which provides services to other schools in the form of special education services, support staff, substitute teachers, and educational technology (such as computers and distance learning). Students in Monroe may also attend one of two public charter schools.

More than a dozen various parochial schools operate in and around Monroe. In 2012, the three largest parochial elementary schools (St. Michael the Archangel, St. Mary, and St. John the Baptist) merged to form Monroe Catholic Elementary Schools, serving infants through 8th grade. The St. Michael Campus serves infants through 1st grade, St. John 2nd through 4th grade, and St. Mary grades 5 through 8. The largest parochial school is St. Mary Catholic Central High School, which enrolls more than 400 students annually. It has a full sports program that competes against the other public school districts. Zion Lutheran School is a grade school (Pre-K-8) of the Wisconsin Evangelical Lutheran Synod in Monroe. Parents may also homeschool their children.

Marygrove College, sponsored by the local Sisters, Servants of the Immaculate Heart of Mary (IHM), was founded in Monroe in 1905 as a Catholic liberal arts college. The college moved to Detroit in 1927. From 1918 to 1980 the IHM also operated a boarding school, the Hall of the Divine Child, in Monroe. Monroe County Community College was founded in 1964 just west of Monroe. It is Monroe County's only higher education facility.

== Media ==
The Monroe News is Monroe's daily newspaper, reporting on all of Monroe County. It was founded in 1825 and for many years was called The Monroe Evening News. It was purchased by GateHouse Media in 2015, before which it had been employee-owned for about 20 years.

Nielsen puts Monroe in the Detroit designated market area (DMA), but stations from Toledo also reach Monroe County and consider it part of their coverage area. Only In Monroe is a monthly public-access television program covering news on the Monroe area. It is hosted by Kaye Lani Rae Rafko and Michelle Baumann. Comedian and nationally known former talk show host Stephen Colbert was a guest host of the show on July 1, 2015. He interviewed musician Eminem. Colbert returned as guest host on May 22, 2026, the day after his run hosting The Late Show ended. On that occasion, he was joined by musician Jack White as musical director, with guest Jeff Daniels and video cameos by Eminem, Steve Buscemi, and Byron Allen. Only in Monroe and other public access programming are on Monroe Public Access Cable Television.

Rewind 94.3 WERW is Monroe's low-power educational FM frequency. The station once belonged to Monroe Public Schools and is now run by Monroe Public Access Cable Television. Monroe County Radio is an Internet radio station founded in 2012; it covers Monroe County news and sports from a studio in Monroe. Nash Icon WMIM 98.3, in downtown Monroe, is the area's Cumulus radio station. The music format is country. Before Cumulus owned the station, it was locally owned. Radio stations from Detroit and Toledo are also reach Monroe.

== Transportation ==
=== Highway and bus ===
Monroe is served by the Lake Erie Transit public transportation bus system. Established in 1975, Lake Erie Transit has a fleet of 31 buses and serves about 400,000 riders per year. In 2008, the system logged 764,000 miles. It operates buses on eight fixed routes in and around Monroe, and serves several neighboring townships outside its normal routes should a passenger call ahead for a ride. From Bedford Township, its provides transportation to and from two shopping malls in Toledo, Ohio.

- I-75 travels through Monroe and provides access to Toledo and Detroit. There are five interchanges in and near Monroe: LaPlaisance Road (exit 11), Front Street (exit 13), Elm Street (exit 14), North Dixie Highway (exit 15), and Nadeau Road (exit 18).
- I-275 has its southern terminus 7 miles (11 km) north of Monroe. Splitting off from I-75, I-275 is a western bypass around Detroit. Aside from I-75, the highway can be accessed from Monroe by US 24 (Telegraph Road) via exit 2.
- M-50 terminates in Monroe at US 24 and provides a direct route to Dundee, Jackson, and further. In Monroe, M-50 is known locally as South Custer Road. Its former terminus used to be I-75 at exit 15.
- US 24 travels through Monroe and provides access to Toledo and western portions of Detroit. The road is known locally as North Telegraph and South Telegraph — divided at the River Raisin. US 24 also connects to I-275 just north of Monroe.
- M-125 travels directly through the downtown area before merging into US 24 north of Monroe. South of downtown after Jones Avenue, it is called South Dixie Highway. Downtown, it is South Monroe Street. North of the River Raisin, it is North Monroe Street.
- M-130 was a state highway that ran along the River Raisin's northern banks from 1930 to 1955. It ran for just over nine miles (14 km), with its eastern terminus at US 24. In 1955, control of the highway was transferred back to the county. Today, it is called North Custer Road.
- The Dixie Highway ran through Monroe in as early as 1915. It was originally one of the few ways to reach places like Florida, but the highway was largely replaced by I-75 beginning in the 1960s. Today, the namesake of the highway is used for two non-connecting highways (one being M-125), although the same route and remnants of the original highway are long gone.
- US 25 was the designated name for the portion of the Dixie Highway north of Cincinnati, including the portion running through Monroe. Like the Dixie Highway, US 25 was largely replaced, and the existing highway was truncated at Cincinnati.
- Custer Airport was built in 1946 and is on the former M-130. It is very small and seldom used. No commercial or passenger flights depart from or arrive at Custer Airport. There is one paved runway used by small personal airplanes. There is also a small aviation school on the site. Air service in the area is primarily through the Metro Airport in Wayne County.

=== Railroads ===
Present-day freight hauling railroads operating through and around Monroe are the Norfolk Southern, CSX, and the Canadian National. Historic railroads operating until the 1950s to 1960s were the Pere Marquette, Ann Arbor, Wabash, Grand Trunk Western, and the Detroit, Toledo, and Ironton. The Baltimore and Ohio had trackage rights with the PM and the Wabash upon which to operate its Detroit-to-Toledo passenger trains such as the Ambassador, which continued to Washington, D.C., Baltimore, Philadelphia, and New York City.

=== Interurbans ===
From 1900 to the 1930s, the electric Detroit United Railway (eventually becoming the Eastern Michigan Ry) operated hourly interurban passenger service between Detroit and Toledo through Monroe. The DU/EM provided passenger transportation and carried freight. The gradual business lost as Michigan and Ohio and their towns paved highways in the 1920s and the dramatic loss of business caused by the Great Depression shut the interurban down in 1932. The Eastern Michigan had carried considerable freight and passengers from Detroit to Cleveland exchanged with the Lake Shore Electric interurban at Toledo. It carried freight and passengers from Detroit to Dayton, Columbus, and Cincinnati exchanged with the Cincinnati and Lake Erie interurban at Toledo.

=== Port ===
The Port of Monroe is a seaport on Lake Erie. It is Michigan's only port on Lake Erie. The port handles a variety of cargo and is a growing hub for multimodal transportation in the region.

== Notable people ==
- Rance Allen (1948–2020), bishop, songwriter, gospel singer
- Alfred E. Bates, U.S. Army major general
- Frankie Biggz (b. Francisco Andres Lucio, 1973), record producer, singer-songwriter, musician, and DJ
- Vic Braden (1929–2014), tennis champion and coach
- Christie Brinkley (b. 1954), model; born in Monroe
- Robert K. Brown (b. 1932), combat correspondent, investigative journalist, and founder, editor, publisher of Soldier of Fortune magazine
- George Cacioppo (1926–1986), composer
- Horace Thompson Carpenter (1857–1947), artist and art critic, historian
- Jabez Chickering, Massachusetts lawyer who fled to Monroe after stealing $35,000 in 1814.
- Isaac P. Christiancy (1812–1890), Chief Justice of the Michigan Supreme Court
- Ken W. Clawson (1936–1999), deputy director of communications for President Richard Nixon during the Watergate scandal
- Audie Cole (b. 1989), football player for the Minnesota Vikings
- Joe Bellino (b. 1958), businessman, member of the Michigan Senate
- Oliver H. P. Cowdery (1806–1850), important figure in founding of the Latter Day Saint movement
- Boston Custer (1848–1876), younger brother of General George Custer, killed at the Battle of Little Big Horn
- Elizabeth Bacon Custer (1842–1933), wife of General Custer; born in Monroe
- George Armstrong Custer (1839–1876), iconic 19th-century soldier; lived much of his early life in Monroe
- Eric Daman (b. 1970), fashion designer
- Robert S. Duncanson (1821–1872), first professional African-American artist
- Elisha Peyre Ferry (1825–1895), first governor of the state of Washington
- Carl Ford (b. 1980), football player
- Don Gonyea (b. 1956), White House correspondent for National Public Radio
- Valerie Harper (1939–2019), actress, star of sitcoms The Mary Tyler Moore Show, Rhoda and Valerie; grew up in Monroe
- John James Hattstaedt, musician, founder and president of the American Conservatory of Music in Chicago (1886–1991), was born and grew up in Monroe
- James Ilgenfritz (b. 1978), double bass player and composer
- Ernest Ingersoll (1852–1946), environmentalist and writer
- Mary Harris "Mother" Jones (1837–1930), union organizer; lived in Monroe
- Ken Kelley (1949–2008), journalist, editor, and publisher
- Ernst G. W. Keyl (1804–1872), Lutheran clergyman; died in Monroe
- Tonya Kinzinger (b. 1968), actress; born in Monroe
- Karen Koch (b. 1951), world's first professional female ice hockey player
- Charles Lanman (1819–1895), author, artist and US government official
- Marie-Thérèse Lasselle (1743–1819), 18th-century artist
- Robert McClelland (1807–1880), prominent Michigan politician
- Bronco McKart (b. 1971), prizefighter, World Boxing Organization champion
- J. Sterling Morton (1832–1902), prominent conservationist; lived in Monroe from 1834 to 1854
- Fannie Ellsworth Newberry (1848–1942), writer of girls' stories; born in Monroe
- Kaye Lani Rae Rafko (b. 1963), Miss America 1988
- Henry Armstrong Reed (1858–1876), nephew of George Custer, killed at Little Big Horn
- James A. Roy, 16th Chief Master Sergeant of the Air Force
- Paul W. Smith, WJR radio personality
- Vern Sneider (1916–1981), novelist who wrote Teahouse of the August Moon
- George Spalding, U.S. congressman
- Matt Urban (1919–1995), most decorated combat soldier of World War II
- Frankie E. Harris Wassom (1850–1933), educator and poet
- Todd Williams (b. 1969), two-time U.S. Olympian at 10,000m (1992, 1996)
- Eric Wilson (b. 1978), football player
- Warner Wing (1805–1876), Michigan jurist and legislator

== Sister cities ==
Monroe, Michigan has only one official sister city:

- Hofu, Japan, since 1993
