= Frank Harris (cricketer) =

English cricketer

Personal information
- Full name: Frank Albert Harris
- Born: 19 March 1907; Bristol, England
- Died: 21 February 1936 (aged 28); Bristol, England
- Batting: Right-handed
- Bowling: Unknown

Domestic team information
- Years: Team
- 1929–1931: Gloucestershire

Career statistics
Competition	First-class
Matches	10
Runs scored	68
Batting average	5.66
100s/50s	–/–
Top score	33
Balls bowled	42
Wickets	–
Bowling average	–
5 wickets in innings	–
10 wickets in match	–
Best bowling	–
Catches/stumpings	3/–
- Source: Cricinfo, 31 July 2011

Frank Albert Harris (19 March 1907 – 21 February 1936) was an English cricketer. Harris was a right-handed batsman, but his bowling style is unknown. He was born in Bristol.

Harris made his first-class debut for Gloucestershire against Warwickshire in the 1929 County Championship. He made 9 further first-class appearances, the last of which came against Lancashire in the 1931 County Championship. In his 10 first-class matches he batted without success, scoring 68 runs at an average of 5.66, with a high score of 33.

He died in Bristol on 21 February 1936.
