= Frankie E. Harris Wassom =

American poet

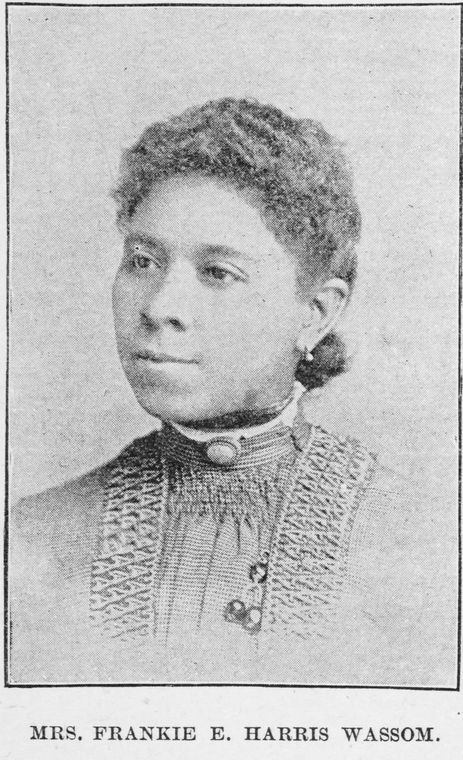
Frankie E. Harris Wassom, from an 1893 publication.

Frankie E. Harris Wassom (1850-1933) was an American writer and educator.

== Early life ==
Frankie Emma Harris was born in Monroe, Michigan and raised in Oberlin, Ohio, the daughter of Beverly Harris and Rebecca E. West Harris. Her parents were involved in the activities of the Underground Railroad before Emancipation. Frankie E. Harris attended Oberlin College, like her older sisters did, to study music and fine arts. She graduated in 1870.

== Career ==
Frankie E. Harris taught school in Virginia after college. She became a school principal in Knoxville, Tennessee in 1871. In 1874 she accepted a position as teacher in Mississippi, but only stayed a year. After she married, Frankie E. Harris Wassom taught and wrote poetry for newspapers in Goldsboro, North Carolina. She taught aspiring teachers at the Goldsboro Normal School and was an officer of the Colored Teachers Council of Wayne County. By 1893 she was teaching in Knoxville again. In 1907, she was teaching at the Lincoln Institute in Kansas. In 1916, she was a school principal in Odessa, Missouri. In all, she taught for 54 years, including two faculty positions at black colleges.

In 1886 her first book of poems was published. She showed some of her art at the North Carolina State Colored Industrial Fair that same year, and a song she wrote, "Coming to the Fair", was performed at the fair's educational convention.

== Personal life ==
Frankie E. Harris married Col. George T. Wassom, a lawyer and politician, in 1874. They had two daughters, Pearl and Mabel. F. E. H. Wassom died in North Carolina in 1933, aged 83 years.

Her sister's Elizabeth's husband was James E. O'Hara, a lawyer and congressman from North Carolina.
