= Frank Harris (Australian footballer) =

Australian rules footballer

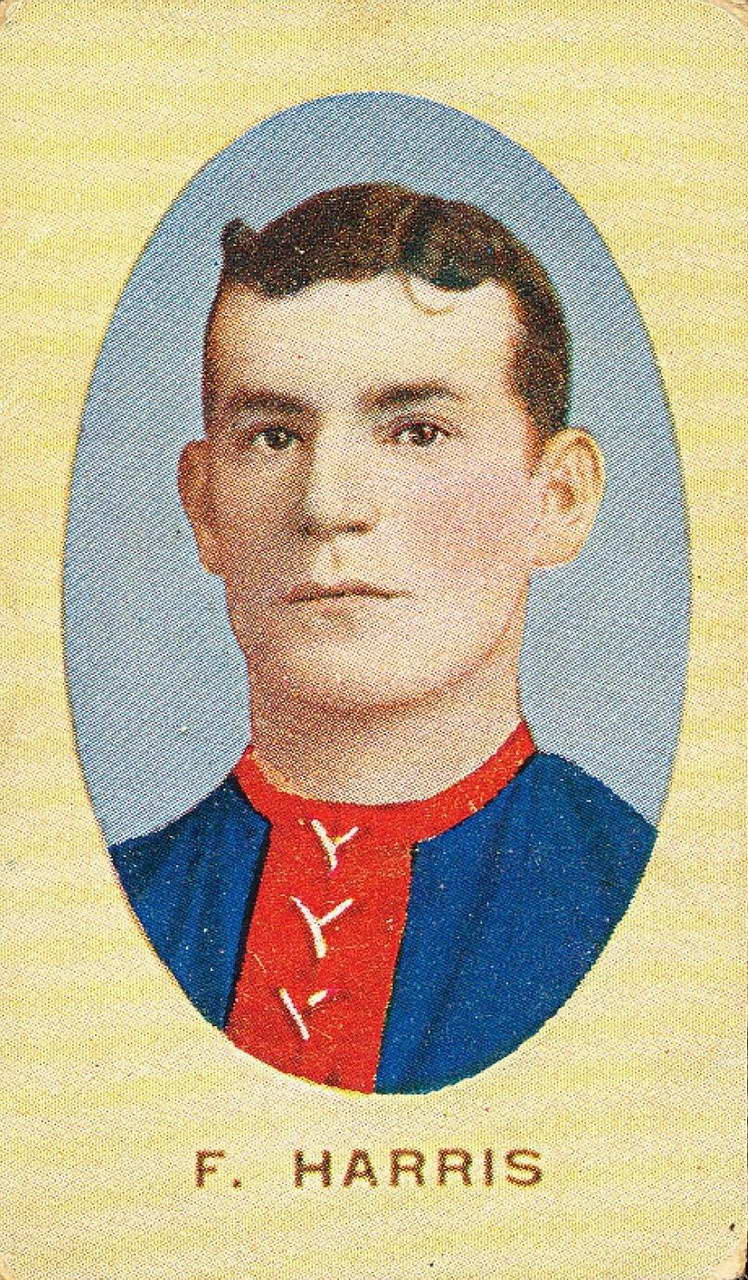
- Cigarette card of Harris in 1910

Personal information
- Full name: Francis Harold Harris
- Nickname: Codger
- Born: 1 June 1883; St Kilda, Victoria
- Died: 26 June 1961 (aged 78); Garfield, Victoria
- Original team: Port Melbourne District

Playing career^{1}
Years	Club	Games (Goals)
1903–05	St Kilda	25 (5)
1907–12	Melbourne	61 (3)
1913	Essendon Association	7 (3)
Total		93 (11)
- ^{1} Playing statistics correct to the end of 1913.

Francis Harold Harris (1 June 1883 – 26 June 1961) was an Australian rules footballer who played with St Kilda and Melbourne in the Victorian Football League (VFL). In 1913, he was cleared to Essendon Association in the Victorian Football Association (VFA).
