= Toledo Suburban Airport =

Airport in Michigan, United States

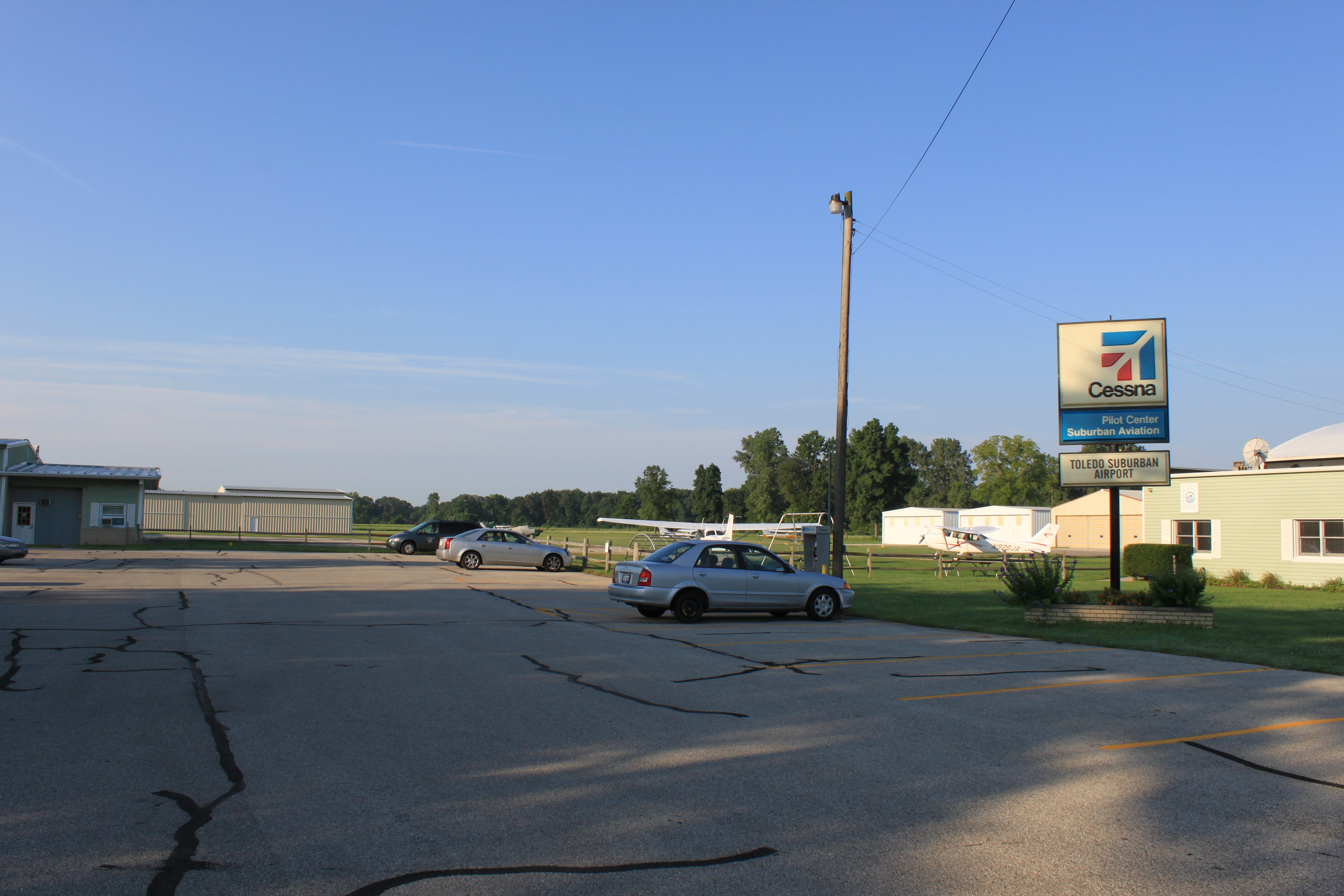
- Airport entrance, Section Road
- IATA: none; ICAO: KDUH; FAA LID: DUH

Summary
- Airport type: Public
- Owner: Suburban Holdings Inc.
- Serves: Lambertville, Michigan
- Elevation AMSL: 669 ft / 204 m
- Coordinates: 41°44′09″N 083°39′21″W

Map
- Location of airport in Michigan DUH (the United States)

Runways
Direction	Length		Surface
Direction	ft	m	Surface
9/27	4,851	1,479	Asphalt

Statistics (2008)
- Aircraft operations: 17,000
- Based aircraft: 25
- Source: Federal Aviation Administration

Toledo Suburban Airport (ICAO: KDUH, FAA LID: DUH) is a public use airport located two nautical miles (3.7 km) southwest of the central business district of Lambertville, a city in Monroe County, Michigan, United States. It is located just north of Michigan's border with Ohio and northwest of the city of Toledo, Ohio. It is included in the Federal Aviation Administration (FAA) National Plan of Integrated Airport Systems for 2017–2021, in which it is categorized as a general aviation facility.

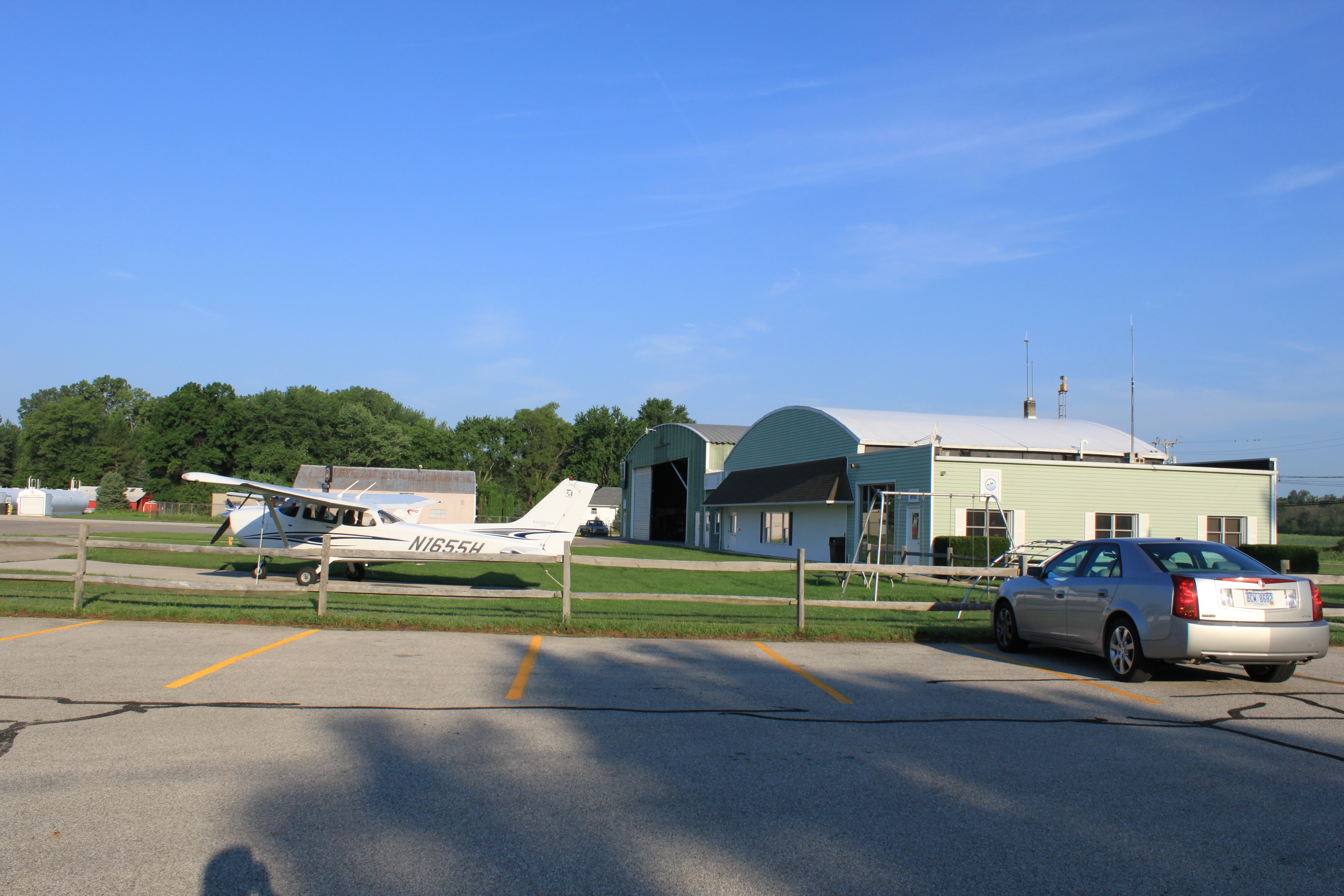
Hangar and airport office

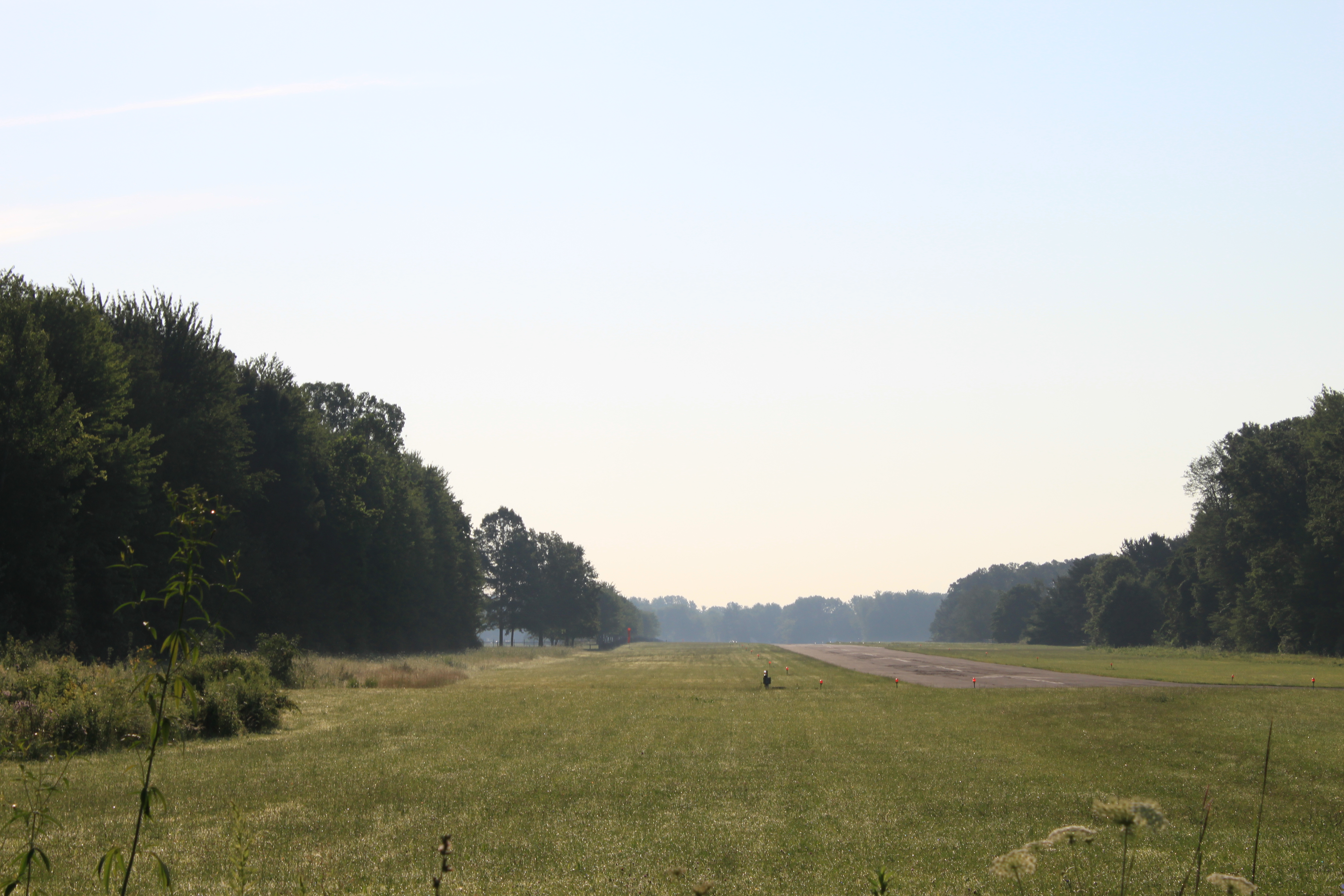
Runway facing east from Whiteford Road

Although many U.S. airports use the same three-letter location identifier for the FAA and IATA, this airport is assigned DUH by the FAA and has no designation from the IATA.

== Facilities and aircraft ==
Toledo Suburban Airport covers an area of 90 acres (36 ha) at an elevation of 669 feet (204 m) above mean sea level. It has one runway designated 9/27 with an asphalt surface measuring 4,807 by 50 feet (1,465 x 15 m).

The airport is staffed from 8 am until 6 pm. It has a fixed-base operator that provides flight instruction, GA piston maintenance (specializing in Cessna restarts), Cessna parts, hangars, and tie downs. It has 100LL and Jet A fuel. The aircraft also has a strong aircraft sales presence, specializing in Cessna aircraft.

For the 12-month period ending December 31, 2021, the airport had over 17,000 aircraft operations, an average of 47 per day. They were all general aviation. At that time there were 25 aircraft based at this airport: 24 single-engine airplanes and 1 helicopter.

=== Transit ===
The airport is accessible by road from Section Road, and is close to US-23.

== Accidents and incidents ==
- On November 5, 2001, a Robinson R22 Beta impacted the ground while landing at Toledo Suburban. The pilot reported the aircraft started a translating tendency to the right while hovering, and while the pilot tried to correct, the aircraft turned 180 degrees, and the tail rotor struck the ground before the right skid dug in. The helicopter went into a dynamic rollover on its right side. The probable cause was found to be the pilot's improper flare during landing.
- On June 26, 2020, a Beechcraft 35 crashed at Toledo Suburban Airport. The aircraft performed a gear-up landing, and the pilot was not injured.

== See also ==
- List of airports in Michigan
