= Francis Harris (physician) =

English physician

- Born: 1 December 1829
- Died: 3 September 1885 (aged 55)
- Occupation: Physician

Francis Harris (1 December 1829 – 3 September 1885) was an English physician.

== Biography ==
Harris was the son of a hat manufacturer. He was born on 1 December 1829 at Winchester Row, Southwark, and was baptised in St. Saviour's, Southwark. He was educated at King's College, London, and at Caius College, Cambridge, where he graduated B.A. in 1852, and, after studying medicine at St. Bartholomew's Hospital, M.B. in 1854. He lived for a time in Gray's Inn, and in November 1856 became house-surgeon to the Children's Hospital in Great Ormond Street, London. In 1857 he became a member of the Royal College of Physicians, and soon after went to continue his studies, first in Paris, and afterwards, under Rudolf Virchow, in Berlin. After a year abroad his foreign studies concluded with a short visit to Prague and Vienna, and on his return to London he took to the practice of obstetrics, because he could see no other opportunity of practice; but in 1858 he was elected demonstrator of morbid anatomy at St. Bartholomew's Hospital, and in May 1859 assistant-physician to the Children's Hospital in Great Ormond Street. In that year he took his M.D. degree at Cambridge. His thesis, which was published, was ‘On the Nature of the Substance found in the Amyloid Degeneration of Various Organs of the Human Body.’ In this he described two cases of amyloid disease of the liver and two of the kidneys, which were the only cases he had met with in sixty post-mortems made at St. Bartholomew's; these were the first elaborate descriptions of the disease by an English morbid anatomist. He attained some reputation from this work, and never published any other. In 1861 he abandoned midwifery and was elected assistant-physician to St. Bartholomew's Hospital, and in the same year lecturer on botany; and in August 1861 married his second cousin, Marianne Harris. In 1865 he bought an estate at Lamberhurst, Kent, a district he had liked from boyhood, and here many guests and all his neighbours used to enjoy his kindly hospitality and pithy conversation. He cultivated pineapples, oranges, and orchids. A dendrobium and a calanthe, hybrids which he produced, are called after him. He became subject to bronchitis, resigned his physiciancy in 1874, became more and more of a valetudinarian, caught cold while fishing in Hampshire, and died at his town house, 24 Cavendish Square, of pneumonia of both lungs, on 3 September 1885. He was buried in the churchyard of Brenchley, Kent. His astuteness as a physician was extraordinary, and his kindness to younger physicians unbounded. His hair began to grow grey when he was sixteen, and when he was labouring under his fatal illness, in the prime of life, he looked an old man.
