= Erie Township, Michigan =

Civil township in Michigan, United States

- Civil township
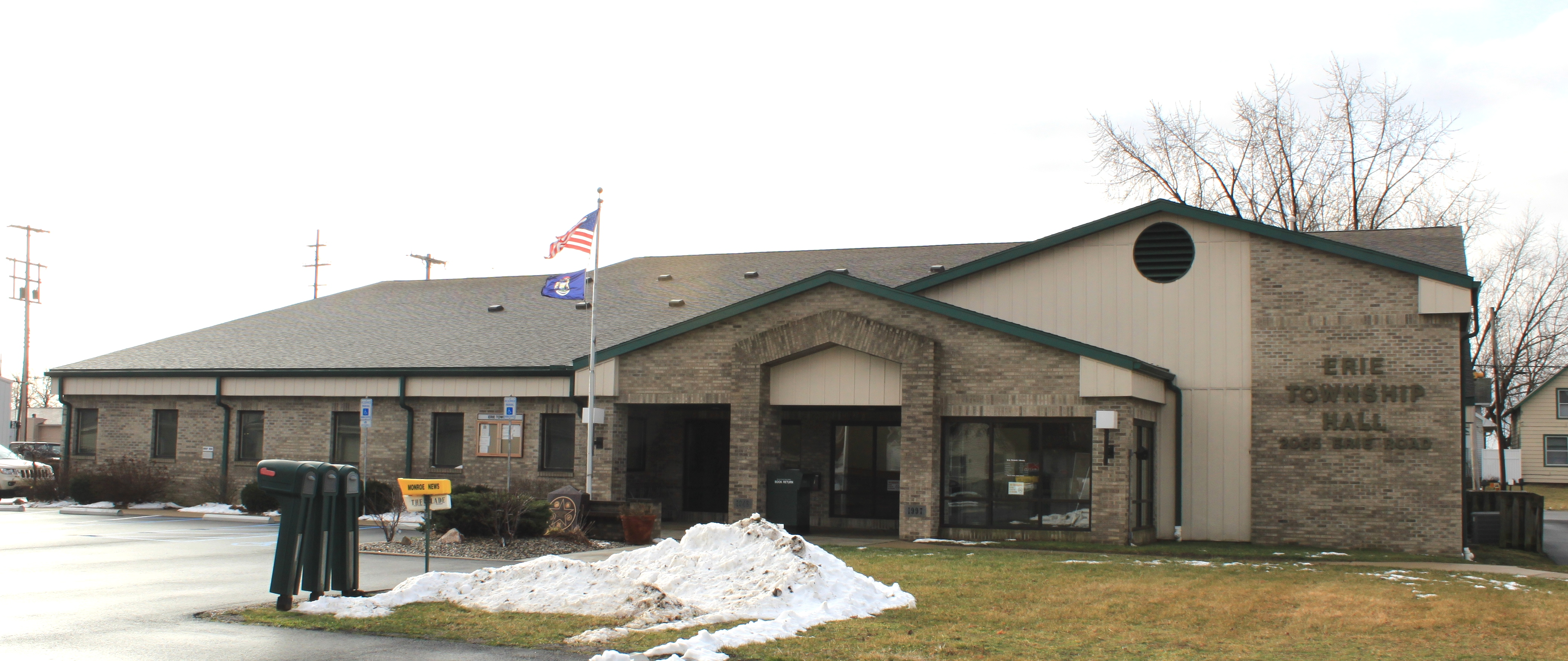
- Erie Township Hall in Erie

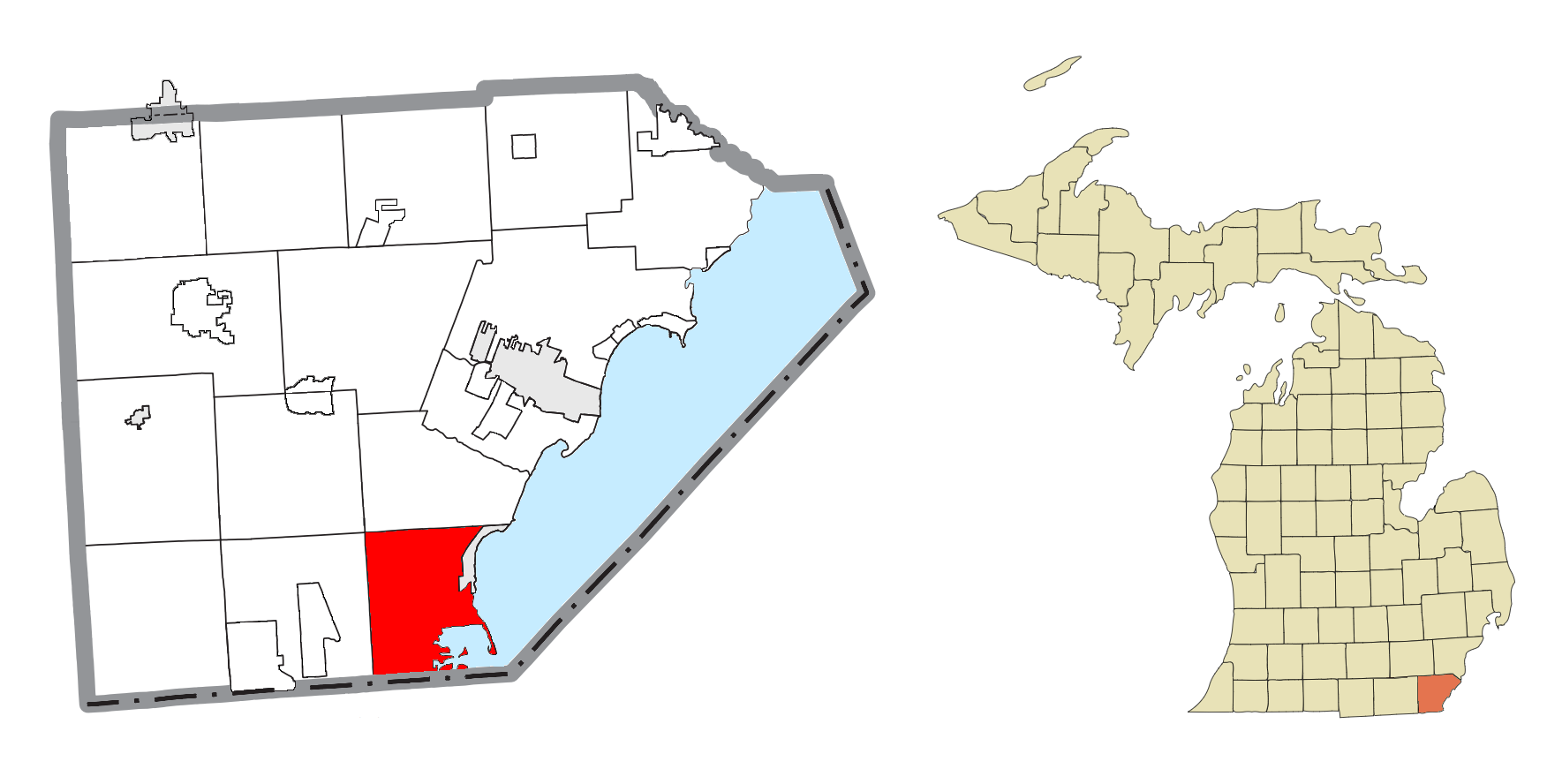
- Location within Monroe County and the state of Michigan

- Location within Michigan Location within the United States
- Coordinates: 41°46′18″N 83°29′22″W
- Country: United States
- State: Michigan
- County: Monroe
- Established: 1827

Government
  - Supervisor: Michael Grodi
  - Clerk: Kim Cousino

Area
  - Total: 29.59 sq mi (76.6 km^{2})
  - Land: 23.88 sq mi (61.8 km^{2})
  - Water: 5.72 sq mi (14.8 km^{2})
- Elevation: 584 ft (178 m)

Population (2020)
  - Total: 4,299
  - Density: 180/sq mi (69/km^{2})
- Time zone: UTC-5 (Eastern (EST))
  - Summer (DST): UTC-4 (EDT)
- ZIP Codes: 48133 (Erie); 48182 (Temperance)
- Area code: 734
- FIPS code: 26-26320
- GNIS feature ID: 1626245
- Website: erietownshipmi.gov

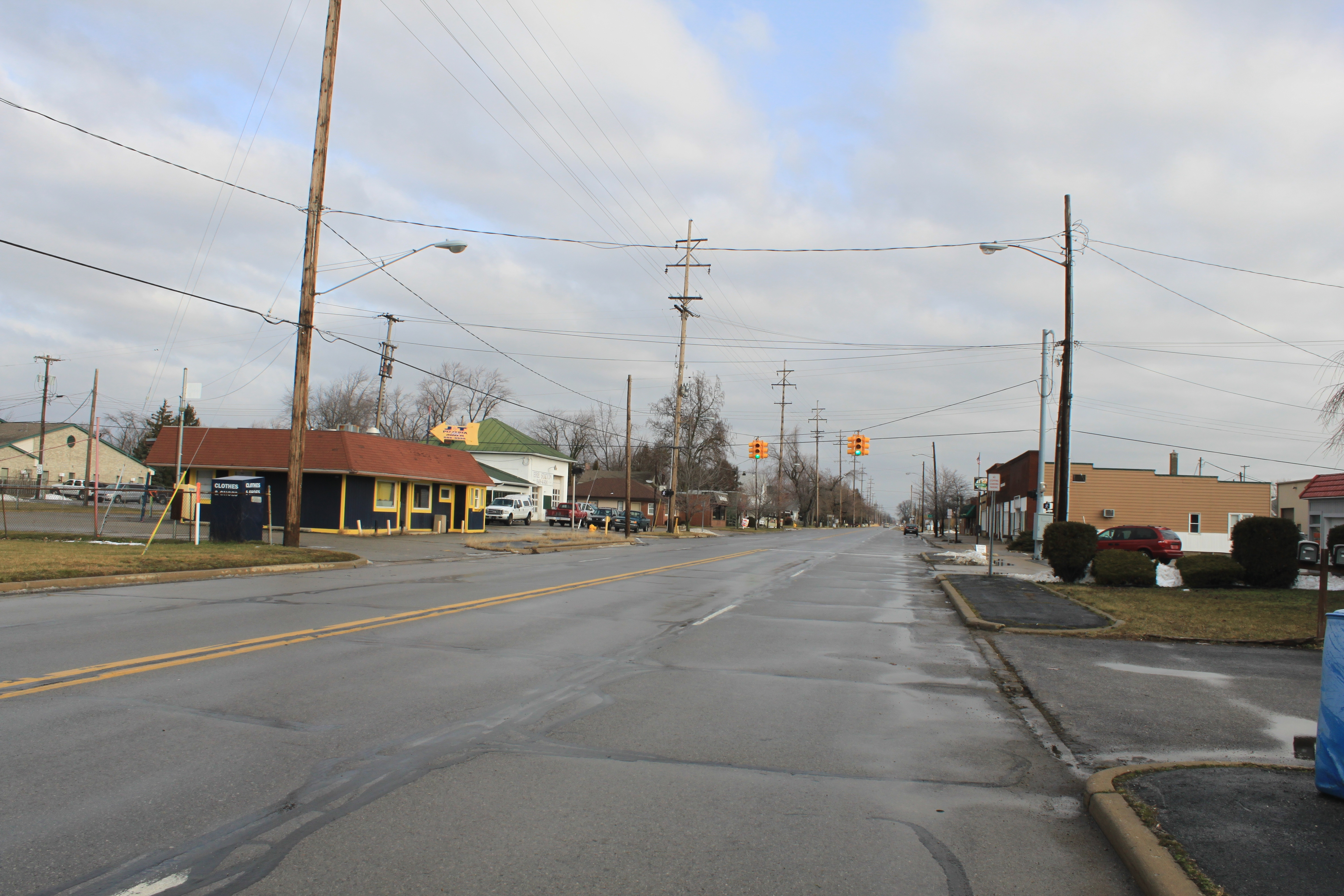
Dixie Highway facing north toward Manhattan Street in the community of Erie

Erie Township is a civil township of Monroe County in the U.S. state of Michigan. The population was 4,299 at the 2020 census. Sharing a southern border with the city of Toledo, Ohio, about 45 miles (72 km) southwest of the city of Detroit, the township is one of the southernmost areas included in the Detroit–Warren–Ann Arbor Combined Statistical Area (Metro Detroit).

The township was organized in 1827 and is the southeasternmost municipality in the state of Michigan. The city of Luna Pier is mostly surrounded by the township, but the two are administered autonomously since Luna Pier incorporated as a city in 1963.

== History ==
Erie was started in 1790 by Métis people moving south from Monroe. Early on, a log church named St. Joseph sur la Baie Miami was built here. Father Gabriel Richard often conducted mass here.

The township was officially organized as one of the first five townships in Monroe County, Michigan Territory, in 1827. The township was originally much larger and included the present-day townships of Bedford, La Salle, and about a 0.5-mile-long (0.8 km) stretch of the Toledo Strip. When a post office was established in 1827, it was given the name of "Bay Settlement". The township's name was changed to Erie in 1835. Bedford Township and La Salle Township were broken off from Erie Township and established in 1836. In the same year, the Toledo Strip portion of Erie Township was given to the state of Ohio. Luna Pier, which occupied the northeast portion of the township, incorporated as a city in 1963, separating it from the township.

The last boundary change within Erie Township came in 1973 when the Supreme Court of the United States intervened on a border dispute involving the small and uninhabited Turtle Island, 2 miles (3 km) offshore in Lake Erie. The 1.5-acre (0.6 ha) island was divided in half, with one side given to Erie Township. The other side of the island, which contains the abandoned Turtle Island Light, was given to Ohio.

== Communities ==
- Alexis is a former settlement beginning in 1878 that was at a junction of two railway lines heading south from Detroit. The site was also known as Detroit Junction.
- Erie is an unincorporated community located in the northwest portion of the township at 41°47′39″N 83°29′47″W. As one of the county's oldest communities, Erie was first settled as early as 1790 by settlers from the north in Frenchtown. It was given a post office named "Bay Settlement" on April 18, 1827. The name was changed to "Erie" after the township on March 5, 1835, and remains in operation.
- Havre is a former settlement located about 1.5 miles (2.4 km) north of the state border on the north shores of Maumee Bay. A post office operated very briefly here for about five months from June 19 until December 15, 1837.
- Vienna is a historic locale located at 41°47′13″N 83°28′41″W. Founded in 1882, it served as a branch on the Michigan Central Railroad in 1882.
- Vistula was a settlement located within the former boundaries of the township. A land company bought and platted the community in 1832, and the territory built a roadway here. A post office in Vistula was established on January 8, 1834, and operated very briefly until it was closed on January 9, 1835, during the onset of the Toledo War. When the border dispute was resolved by 1836, the area of Vistula was transferred to the state of Ohio. The only remnants of the former settlement are included in the Vistula Historic District in Toledo.

== Geography ==
According to the United States Census Bureau, the township has a total area of 29.59 square miles (76.64 km^{2}), of which 23.88 square miles (61.85 km^{2}) are land and 5.72 square miles (14.81 km^{2}), or 19.32%, are water.

Erie Township includes Gard Island, Indian Island, and a portion of Turtle Island in Lake Erie. The Ottawa River runs through the southeasternmost portion of the township and empties into North Maumee Bay within the township. The township also includes the North Maumee Bay Archeological District and portions of the Detroit River International Wildlife Refuge. The Lost Peninsula is located in the southeasternmost portion of the township. It is located on Point Place Peninsula, which is bordered by the Ottawa River on the west and Maumee Bay on the east. Lost Peninsula is an exclave of the township (and of the state of Michigan), as its only land border is with the state of Ohio. The Toledo neighborhood of Point Place borders Lost Peninsula to the south.

The township is bordered by Lake Erie to the east, Bedford Township to the west, La Salle Township to the north, and the city of Luna Pier to the northeast. The state of Ohio borders to the south, including portions of the city of Toledo and Washington Township.

=== Major highways ===
- I-75 runs south–north through the eastern section of township and has one access point along Otter Creek Road (exit 9).
- US 24 (Telegraph Road) runs south–north through the center of the township.
- M-125 (S. Dixie Highway) runs parallel with US 24.
- US 25 is a former U.S. highway from 1926–1973 that is now replaced with M-125.

== Demographics ==
Historical population
Census	Pop.	Note	%±
1850	1,144		—
1860	1,362		19.1%
1870	1,527		12.1%
1880	1,721		12.7%
1890	1,463		−15.0%
1900	1,426		−2.5%
1910	1,477		3.6%
1920	1,226		−17.0%
1930	2,433		98.5%
1940	2,871		18.0%
1950	4,442		54.7%
1960	5,456		22.8%
1970	4,451		−18.4%
1980	4,576		2.8%
1990	4,492		−1.8%
2000	4,850		8.0%
2010	4,517		−6.9%
2020	4,299		−4.8%
U.S. Decennial Census

As of the census of 2000, there were 4,850 people, 1,789 households, and 1,343 families residing in the township. The population density was 201.1 inhabitants per square mile (77.6/km^{2}). There were 1,917 housing units at an average density of 79.5 per square mile (30.7/km^{2}). The racial makeup of the township was 95.32% White, 1.01% African American, 0.60% Native American, 0.21% Asian, 1.42% from other races, and 1.44% from two or more races. Hispanic or Latino people of any race were 4.29% of the population.

There were 1,789 households, out of which 34.5% had children under the age of 18 living with them, 61.3% were married couples living together, 9.3% had a female householder with no husband present, and 24.9% were non-families. 20.5% of all households were made up of individuals, and 6.9% had someone living alone who was 65 years of age or older. The average household size was 2.71 and the average family size was 3.13.

In the township the population was spread out, with 27.1% under the age of 18, 7.3% from 18 to 24, 30.0% from 25 to 44, 25.1% from 45 to 64, and 10.6% who were 65 years of age or older. The median age was 37 years. For every 100 females, there were 102.7 males. For every 100 females age 18 and over, there were 100.6 males.

The median income for a household in the township was $52,442, and the median income for a family was $59,089. Males had a median income of $46,810 versus $27,900 for females. The per capita income for the township was $21,494. About 4.5% of families and 5.1% of the population were below the poverty line, including 6.0% of those under age 18 and 5.4% of those age 65 or over.

== Education ==
The majority of Erie Township is served by Mason Consolidated Schools, while very small portions of the western border are served by Bedford Public Schools to the west in Bedford Township.

== Notable people ==
- Elroy M. Avery, historian, author, and politician; born in Erie Township
