= M-125 (Michigan highway) =

State highway in Monroe County, Michigan, United States

M-125
- M-125 highlighted in red

Route information
- Maintained by MDOT
- Length: 19.480 mi (31.350 km)
- Existed: 1973–present
- Tourist routes: Monroe Historic Heritage Route

Major junctions
- South end: Ohio state line near Toledo, Ohio
- Summit Street in Erie Township; Luna Pier Road in Erie Township
- North end: US 24 near Monroe

Location
- Country: United States
- State: Michigan
- Counties: Monroe

Highway system
- Michigan State Trunkline Highway System; Interstate; US; State; Byways
← M-124	→ M-126

M-125 is a 19 1/2-mile-long (31.4 km) state trunkline highway in the US state of Michigan. The highway is entirely within Monroe County with the southern terminus on the Ohio state border near Toledo and a northern terminus at US Highway 24 (US 24) in Frenchtown Township, 5 miles (8.0 km) north of Monroe. M-125 runs through rural farmlands and connects a couple of smaller towns with Monroe. It has an unsigned connector highway that links the main highway with Interstate 75 (I-75).

The highway is a section of the former Dixie Highway and US 25 in the state. It was first added to the state highway system in 1926 and given its current number in 1973. Previously there were two other highways that carried the M-125 moniker. One in the 1930s ran through the Upper Peninsula near Thompson and a second from 1938 until the mid-1950s was located in Bay County. The current designation was created in 1973 when US 25 was decommissioned in Michigan. The section in downtown Monroe was named what is now a Pure Michigan Byway in 1995.

== Route description ==
M-125 starts at the state line as the continuation of Detroit Avenue running northward from Toledo. Once across the state line, the roadway takes on the Dixie Highway name and passes a residential subdivision. The highway runs north-northeasterly roughly parallel with, and between, both US 24 and I-75 through farm land in rural Monroe County. The trunkline passes through the community of Erie before intersecting with Conn. M-125 (Summit Street) north of town. That unsigned connector is a state highway that links M-125 with I-75 to the south. Continuing north, M-125 intersects Luna Pier Road, which to the west is the unsigned Conn. US 24 that offers a path to US 24 (Telegraph Road).

The route of M-125 changes direction slightly as it passes through the community of LaSalle; north of town it follows a more northeasterly course. The roadway passes through residential areas north of town as it approaches Monroe. South of the city, M-125 crosses the La Plaisance Creek and turns north-northwesterly through South Monroe. North of Lake Monroe, the road name changes from Dixie Highway to Monroe Street. The highway is the main street of the downtown area as it crosses the River Raisin upstream from the River Raisin National Battlefield Park. M-125 exits town near The Mall of Monroe. About five miles (8.0 km) north of Monroe, after running through farm land again, M-125 terminates at an intersection where Dixie Highway merges into US 24 (Telegraph Road).

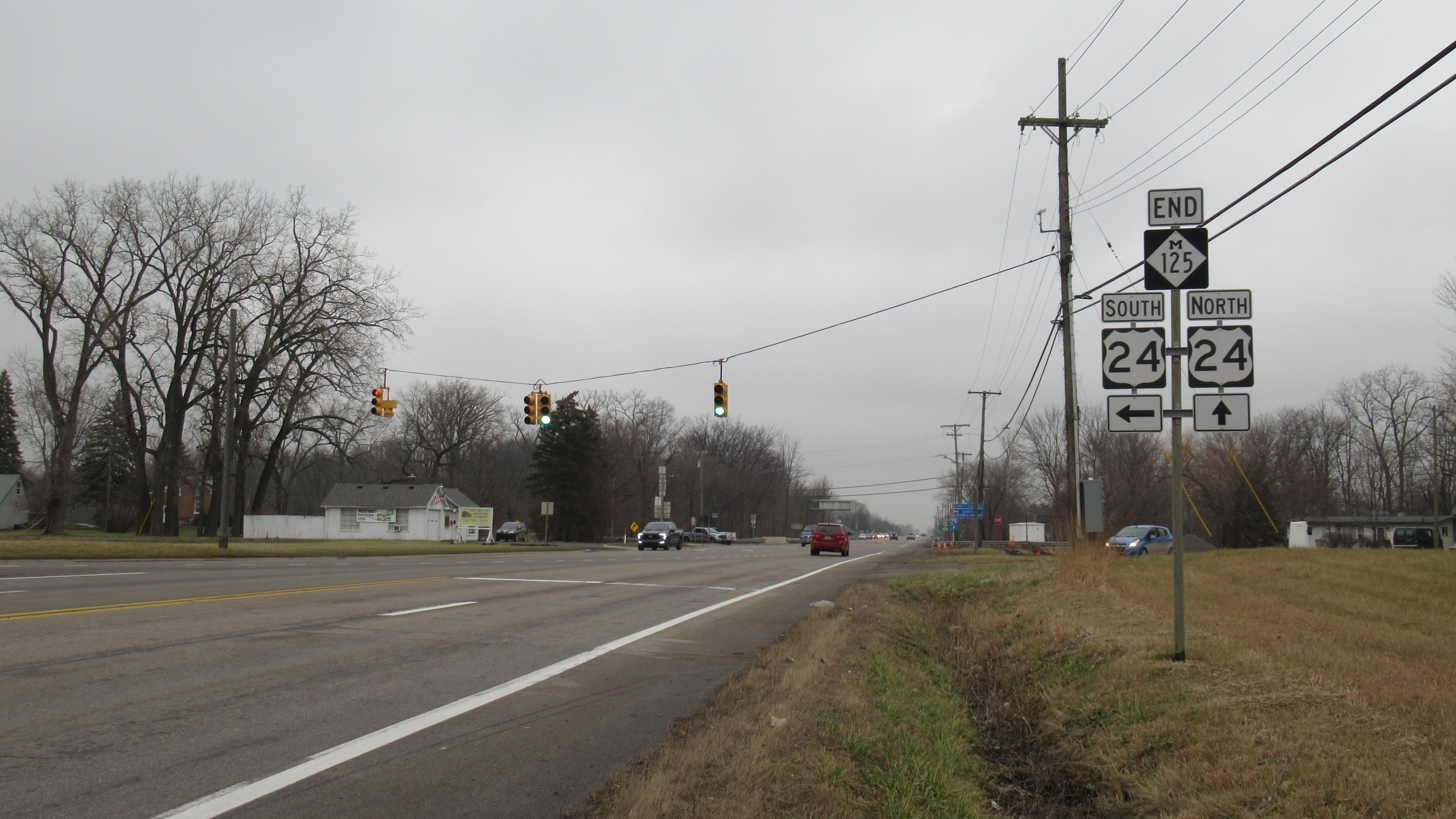
Northern terminus of M-125 at US 24

M-125 is maintained by the Michigan Department of Transportation (MDOT) like other state highways in Michigan. As a part of these maintenance responsibilities, the department tracks the volume of traffic that uses the roadways under its jurisdiction. These volumes are expressed using a metric called annual average daily traffic, which is a statistical calculation of the average daily number of vehicles on a segment of roadway. MDOT's surveys in 2011 showed that the highest traffic levels along M-125 were the 21,229 vehicles daily between Jones and Front streets in Monroe; the lowest counts were the 2,306 vehicles per day between Sterns and Erie roads near Erie. No section of M-125 has been listed on the National Highway System, a network of roads important to the country's economy, defense, and mobility.

== History ==
=== Previous designations ===
M-125 was first designated on a road in the Upper Peninsula from US 2 to north of Thompson in 1931; this roadway was later merged into M-149 in 1936 after a rerouting of US 2 through the area.

Later in 1938, the M-125 designation was used for a highway along Parish Road in Bay County running for three miles (4.8 km) west of US 23 (now M-13). Prior to its adoption into the highway system, Bay County officials had submitted requests to the Works Progress Administration to improve Parish Road, as part of a $20,000,000 (equivalent to $369 million in 2025) project to improve roads across the state which served farms. The highway intersected US 23 between Kawkawlin and Linwood and ran westward to 7 Mile Road. It was added to the state highway system in November 1938, completed as a gravel road in 1939, and paved by 1945. The Michigan State Highway Department announced in July 1956 that it would be transferring the second M-125 back to the control of Bay County's road commission, but that it would resurface the road with bitumen before doing so.

=== Current designation ===
The Dixie Highway was conceived in 1915 to connect Chicago to Miami and commemorate a half-century since the end of the Civil War. On the suggestion of Governor Woodbridge N. Ferris, representatives from Michigan convinced the Dixie Highway Association to include Michigan in the proposed auto trail. Two divisions through the Lower Peninsula were included, the eastern one included a route between Detroit and Toledo via Monroe. This section of the Dixie Highway in Monroe County was first added to the state highway system in 1926 when US 25 was created. The highway was rerouted through downtown Monroe in the early 1930s; instead of turning westward in downtown to connect to Telegraph Road, the highway instead continued northward to the current Dixie Highway–Telegraph Road intersection. When the US 25 designation was decommissioned in the state in 1973, the highway segment between the state line and the Monroe area was given the M-125 designation. The routing has remained unchanged since. In 1995, the section through downtown Monroe was named what is now a Pure Michigan Byway.

== Major intersections ==
The entire highway is in Monroe County.

Location	mi	km	Destinations	Notes
Erie Township	0.000	0.000	North Detroit Avenue south – Toledo	Ohio state line
Erie Township	5.417	8.718	Summit Street to I-75 – Toledo	Northern terminus of unsigned Connector 75
Erie Township	5.876	9.457	Luna Pier Road to US 24 – Samaria, Luna Pier	Eastern terminus of unsigned Connector 125; former M-151
Frenchtown Township	19.480	31.350	US 24 (Telegraph Road) – Detroit, Toledo	
1.000 mi = 1.609 km; 1.000 km = 0.621 mi
