= Erie, Michigan =

- Unincorporated community
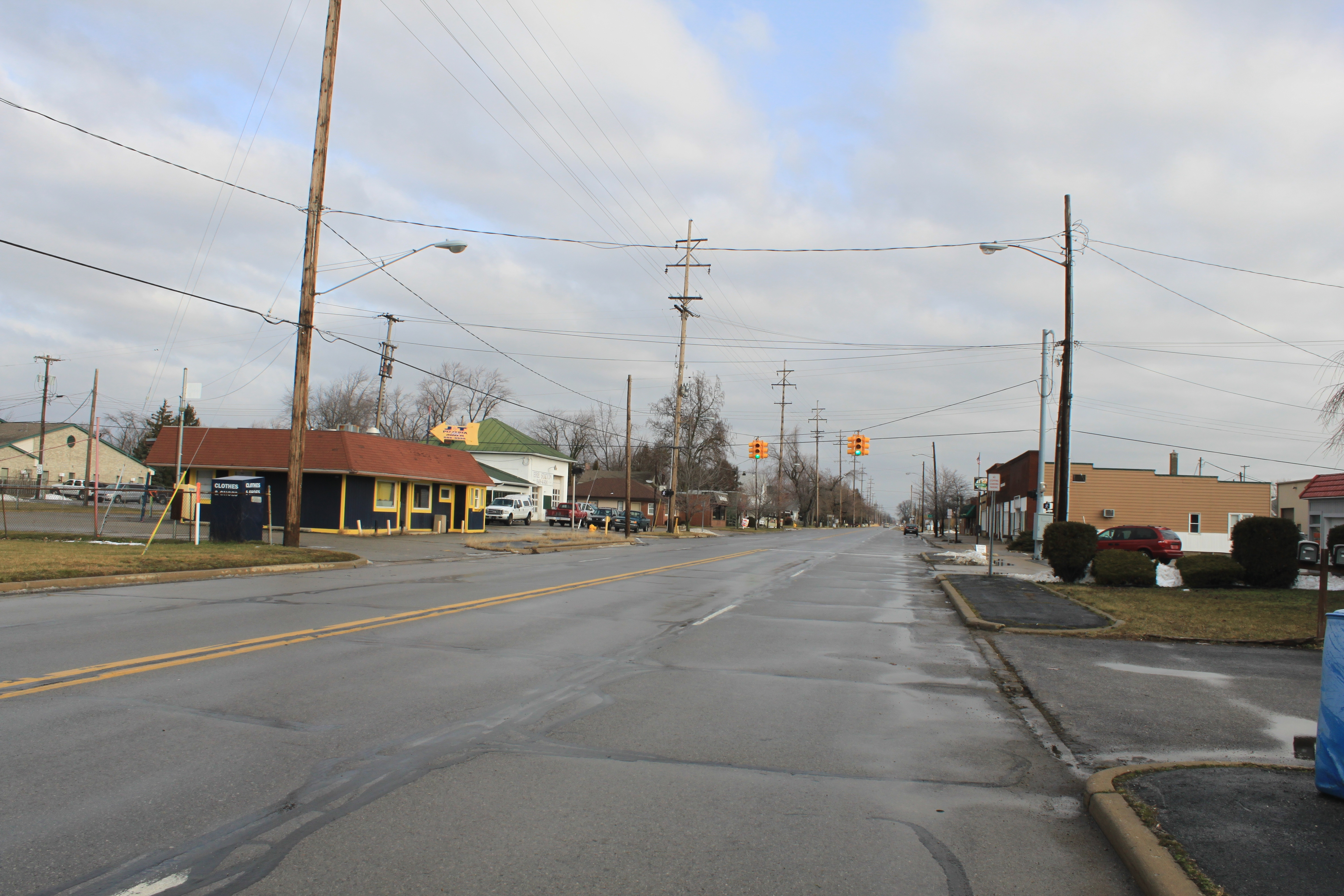
- Looking north along S. Dixie Highway (M-125)

- Location within the state of Michigan Location within the United States
- Coordinates: 41°47′39″N 83°29′47″W
- Country: United States
- State: Michigan
- County: Monroe
- Township: Erie
- Settled: 1790
- Elevation: 591 ft (180 m)
- Time zone: UTC-5 (Eastern (EST))
  - Summer (DST): UTC-4 (EDT)
- ZIP code(s): 48133
- Area code: 734
- GNIS feature ID: 628919

Erie is an unincorporated community in Monroe County in the U.S. state of Michigan. The community is located within Erie Township in the southeastern corner of the state.

As an unincorporated community, Erie has no legally defined boundaries or population statistics of its own but does have its own post office with the 48133 ZIP Code.

== Geography ==
The rural community of Erie is located within Erie Township in southeast Monroe County about 4.0 miles (6.4 km) north of the Ohio state line and 2.0 miles (3.2 km) west of the Lake Erie shoreline. The community sits at an elevation of 591 feet (180 m) above sea level.

The community is centered along M-125, which is known locally as South Dixie Highway. Other nearby major roadways include U.S. Route 24 (South Telegraph Road) just to the west and Interstate 75 to the east, which is directly accessible via exit 5 (Erie Road). Two unsigned connector routes also runs through the area; Connector 75 connects Interstate 75 to M-125, and Connector 125 connects U.S. Route 24 to M-125. Other nearby unincorporated communities include Vienna to the southeast, Ottawa and Vienna Junction to the south, Yargerville to the northwest, Samaria and Temperance to the west, and Hillcrest Orchard to the north. The nearest incorporated municipalities are the cities of Luna Pier to the east and Toledo, Ohio to the south. The nearest airport is the Erie Aerodrome located about 1.5 miles (2.4 km) southwest of the community, although this airport is no longer in operation.

Erie contains its own post office that uses the 48133 ZIP Code. The post office is located at 9780 South Dixie Highway in the center of the community. The ZIP Code serves the majority of Erie Township, as well as very small portions of southern La Salle Township and eastern Bedford Township. The ZIP Code also serves the southernmost areas of the city of Luna Pier.

The community is served by Mason Consolidated Schools, which contains three schools—elementary, middle, and high school—on one main campus just north of the community. The district serves a much larger area extending beyond the community. The parochial St. Joseph Church School is located at 2238 Manhattan Street and is part of the Roman Catholic Archdiocese of Detroit. The Erie Township Hall is located in the center of the community at 2065 Erie Road. The building also contains the Erie Branch Library of the Monroe County Library System. The Erie Fire Department is located right next door at 2048 Manhattan Street. The 3,221-acre (1,303 ha) Erie State Game Area is located just to the east along the shores of Lake Erie. Bay Creek is a small river that runs through the community on its way to Lake Erie.

== History ==
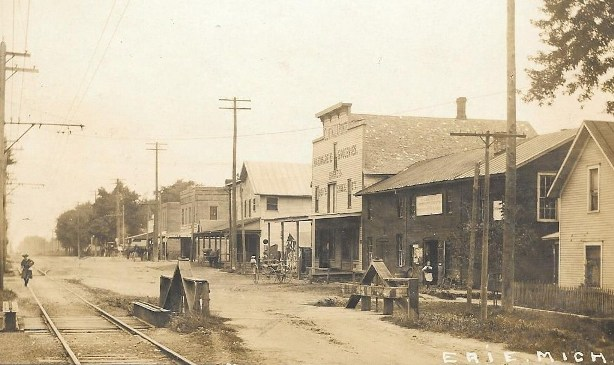
Historic image of Erie in 1909

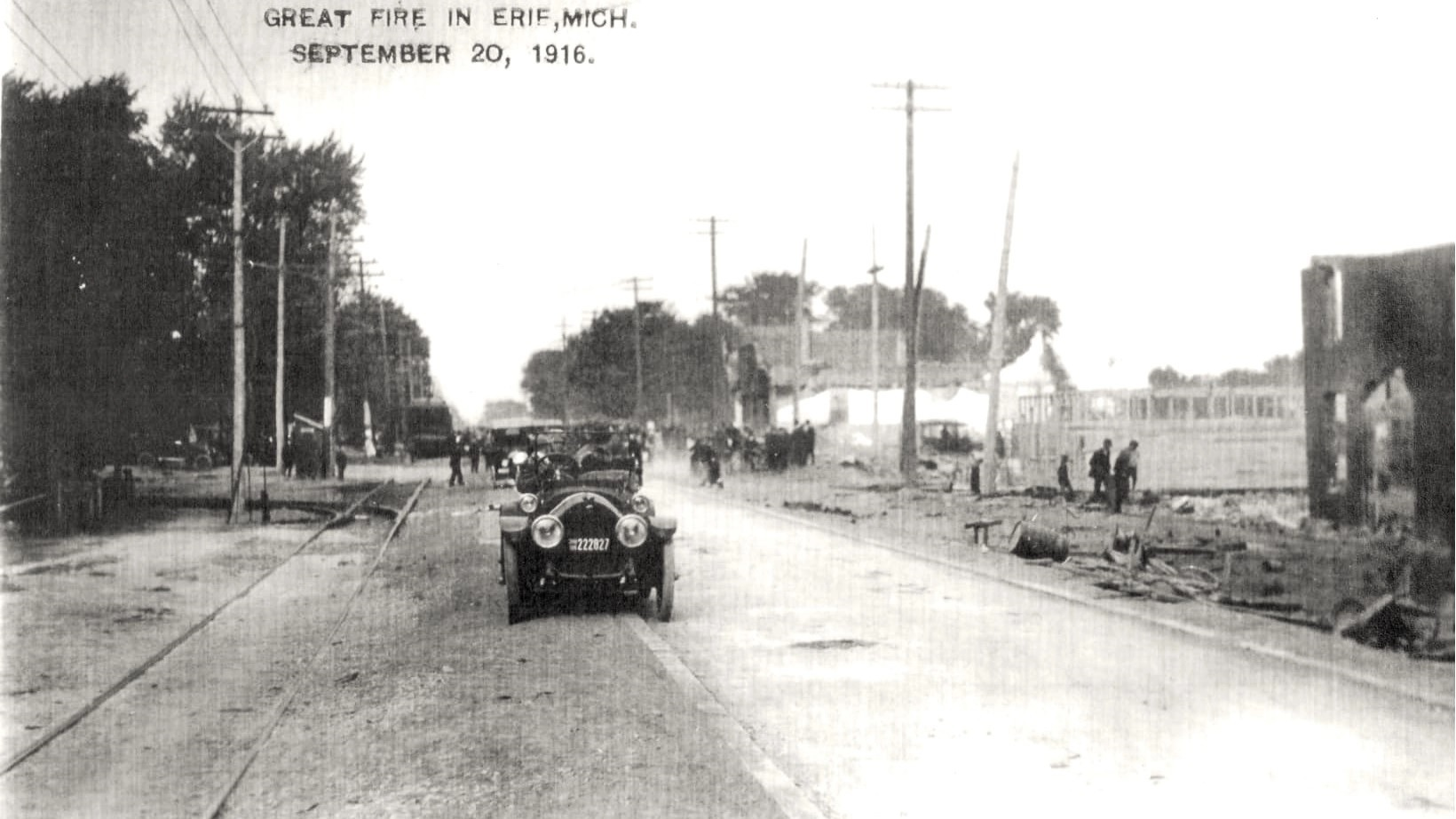
The Great Fire of 1916

The area was first settled as early as 1790 by French settlers who moved south from the Frenchtown settlement (present-day city of Monroe). The settlers cleared an area along the Maumee Bay in what was then the American Territory Northwest of the River Ohio. Gabriel Richard traveled from Detroit and founded a church here that was named St. Joseph sur la Baie Miami, and Richard held sermons here between 1798 and 1820. In 1819, the first log church was built here along Bay Creek, and a new frame church was constructed in 1826. The community, which was located further inland, was given a post office named Bay Settlement on April 18, 1827 when Erie Township was formally organized. Benoni Newkirk served as the first postmaster. On March 5, 1835, postmaster Salmon Keeney had the office name changed to Erie.

The area transitioned through several jurisdictions beginning with the Territory Northwest of the River Ohio. In 1800, it became part of the Indiana Territory, and five years later, it became part of the Michigan Territory. Monroe County was organized in 1817 as the second county in the territory. In 1835, the Toledo War took place in the area, as the state of Ohio to the south and the Michigan Territory disputed the area known as the Toledo Strip, which was part of the original boundaries of the Michigan Territory. In 1836, the Toledo Strip was granted to the state of Ohio, and this made Erie one of the southernmost communities in the new state of Michigan. Although the community was renamed Erie, the name Bay Settlement was still common, as the name later appeared on an 1849 state map. A new brick St. Joseph Catholic Church building was constructed in 1851.

Around 1849, the area received its first railway line when the Michigan Southern Rail Road built a line southward from Monroe to Toledo. This line ran just east of Erie but provided a vital transportation route through the area, especially when the Michigan Central Railroad opened a depot at Vienna in 1882, and passenger service began the next year. By 1896, the Toledo Division of the Pere Marquette Railway also constructed a railway line through the area just west of Erie, and the community would receive its own train depot that year as well. The railway line appeared on an 1896 map of Erie Township, and Erie became the location of a large engine facility used by the Pere Marquette Railway.

On the morning of September 20, 1916, Erie suffered a major fire that became known as the Great Fire of 1916. Different accounts vary as to the origins of the fire, but it may have been caused by a local blacksmith shop. Strong winds allowed the fire to travel quickly through the business district and also spread to outlying farms. Within minutes, the entire northwest portion of the community was engulfed in flames. Since the wind was blowing in the opposite direction, the recently built St. Joseph School was spared, while many students were in school at the time. An older church and railroad boarding house also burned down. The fire spread quickly and destroyed 16 buildings, including two saloons, three grocery stores, the post office, and several shops. Several houses and barns also burned down. At the time, the community had no fire department. In the end, losses exceeded $100,000 ($2.93 million in 2025 dollars) and nearly half the community burned down.

The railway industry continued to expand in the area, and in 1924, the Ottawa rail yard was constructed just to the southwest. The Erie train depot was slightly relocated to accommodate the yard. Ten additional rail lines were constructed in the yard for a total length of 47 miles (76 km) of tracks, as well as a capacity of 17 engine bays and 3,500 cars. The yard operated 24 hours a day.

=== Recent history ===
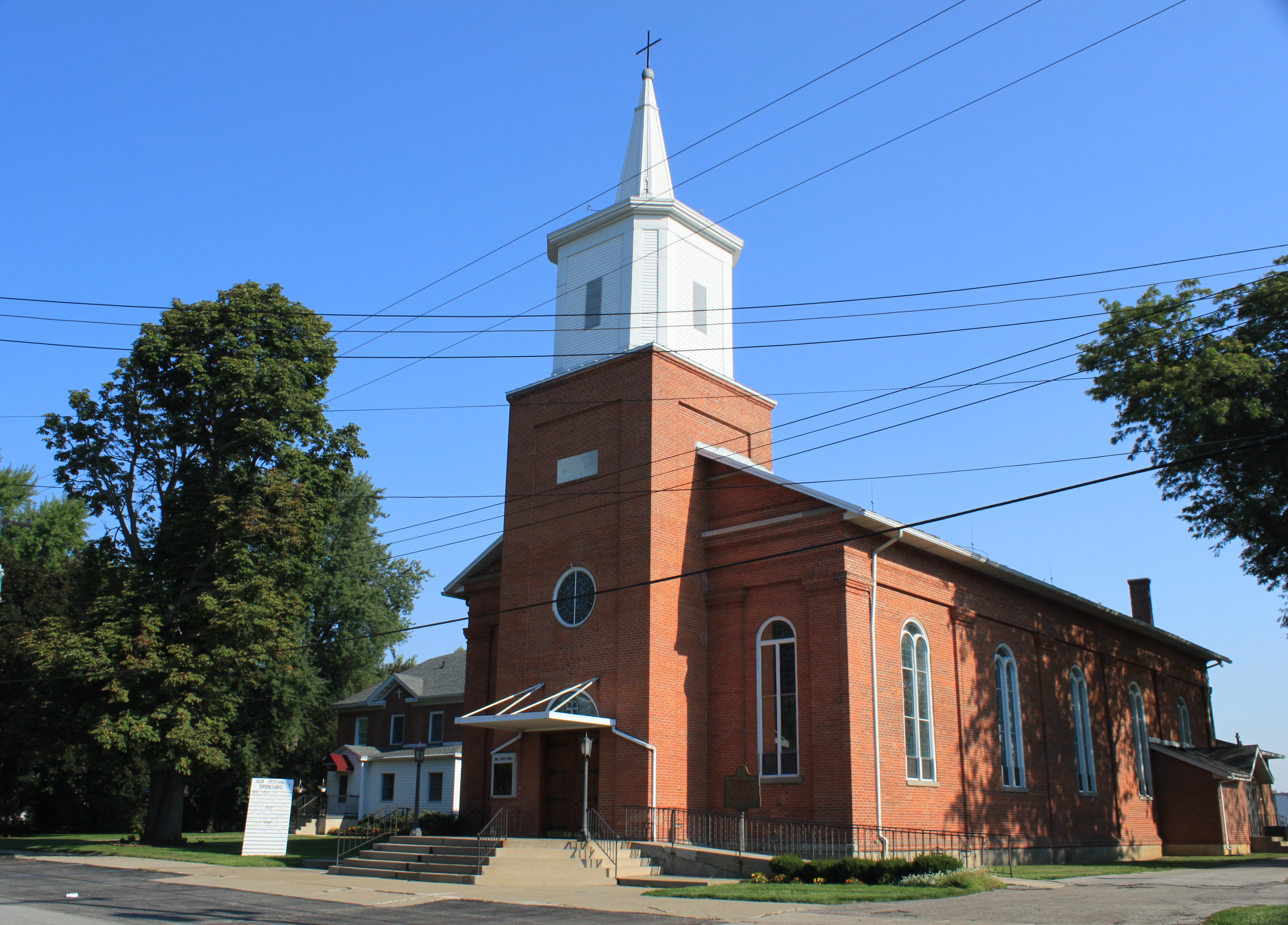
Constructed in 1851, St. Joseph Catholic Church remains in operation

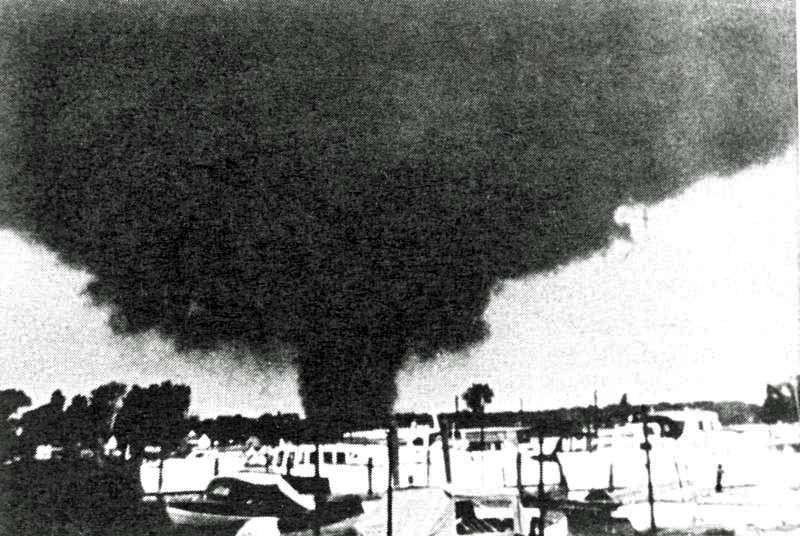
The F-4 tornado on June 8, 1953

The main roadway through Erie was originally a plank road called the Erie & Toledo Plank Road, as it appeared on an 1876 map of Erie Township. This route would later become part of the eastern segment of Dixie Highway in 1915 and soon after part of the original state highway M-56 in 1919. In 1926, M-56 through Erie was renamed as U.S. Route 25 (US 25) as part of the inaugural United States Numbered Highway System and would provide direct road access to Port Huron in the north all the way south to South Carolina. In 1973, this final segment of US 25 was decommissioned and reassigned as state highway M-125, named locally as South Dixie Highway.

Other major roadways in the area include U.S. Route 24, known locally as South Telegraph Road, which was commissioned in 1925. This highway runs just west of the center of the community. By 1945, a divided highway designated as Alternate US 24 (US 24A) was opened from the Ohio state line north through Erie. In 1957, this section of US 24A was approved as the first Michigan segment of Interstate 75 and was completed and designated as such in October 1959.

The railroad continued to operate in Erie until the Ottawa Yard closed in 1961 when the operations were transferred to another rail yard just to the south in Walbridge, Ohio. Rail transport from Detroit to Ohio was now able to travel more efficiently by bypassing the Ottawa Yard, and all of the extra rail lines were removed—leaving only the main dual lines. Rail and freight services continued to operate out of the Erie train depot as late as 1964 until that depot was also closed and later demolished. The nearby Vienna train depot was also closed and demolished. Erie no longer has train service, although the rail lines to the west and east continue to be used. The dual lines to the west are currently operated by CSX Transportation, while the triple lines to the east are operated by Canadian National Railway and Norfolk Southern Railway.

Eighteen years after the devastating fire, the community opened its first fire department in 1934. The St. Joseph Catholic Church remains in operation and continues to hold services at the brick church built in 1851. It is Monroe County's second-oldest continuously operating church building after St. Mary's Church in Monroe, which began operating in 1839. It is also noted as the fourth-oldest church in the Roman Catholic Archdiocese of Detroit.

During the Flint–Worcester tornado outbreak sequence on June 8, 1953, an F4 tornado caused significant damage during its 5.4-mile (8.7 km) path through Erie. The tornado traveled eastward from Temperance toward Lake Erie shortly after midnight, causing four deaths and 18 injuries. It also caused at least $250,000 in damages ($3.0 million in 2025 dollars). During the 1974 Super Outbreak, an F3 tornado formed very briefly just west of the community during the early morning on April 3. This tornado traveled for only 0.3 miles (0.5 km) but still caused $250,000 in damages ($1.6 million in 2025 dollars). There were three injuries but no casualties.

== Notable people ==
- Elroy M. Avery, educator and politician, born in Erie
- Gertrude Crampton, author and educator who lived in Erie while teaching at Mason Consolidated Schools
- Paul Toth, professional baseball player in Major League Baseball, lived in Erie
- Jack Vergiels, educator and politician, born in Erie
