= Mason Consolidated Schools =

School district in Monroe County, Michigan

Address
- 2400 Mason Eagles Drive Erie, Monroe County, Michigan, 48133; United States
- Coordinates: 41°48′41″N 83°29′25″W

District information
- Grades: PreKindergarten–12
- Superintendent: Kelli Tuller
- Schools: 4
- Budget: $11,039,000 2022-2023 expenditures
- NCES District ID: 2619470

Students and staff
- Students: 979 (2024-2025)
- Teachers: 63.04 (on an FTE basis) (2024-2025)
- Staff: 158.8 FTE (2024-2025)
- Student–teacher ratio: 15.53 (2024-2025)
- District mascot: Eagles
- Colors: Blue & gold

Other information
- Website: eriemason.k12.mi.us

Mason Consolidated Schools (sometimes referred to as Erie-Mason) is a public school district in Monroe County, Michigan. It serves Luna Pier and parts of the townships of Erie, La Salle, and Bedford.

== History ==
The first Mason High School was built in 1870 and replaced by a new building in 1903. The current Mason Senior High School was dedicated in October 1961.

== Schools ==
Schools in Mason Consolidated Schools share a campus at 2400 Mason Eagles Drive in Erie, Michigan. Although they share the same address, they are in separate buildings.

Schools in Mason Consolidated Schools district
School	Notes
Mason Senior High School	Grades 9–12.
Mason Middle School	Grades 6-8.
Mason Central Elementary	Grades PreK-5.

== Images ==
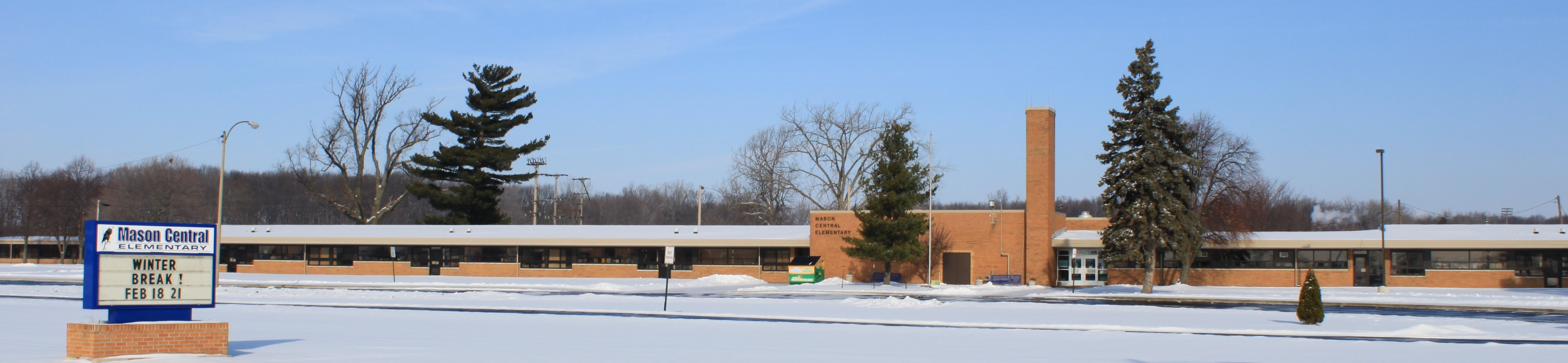
Mason Central Elementary School

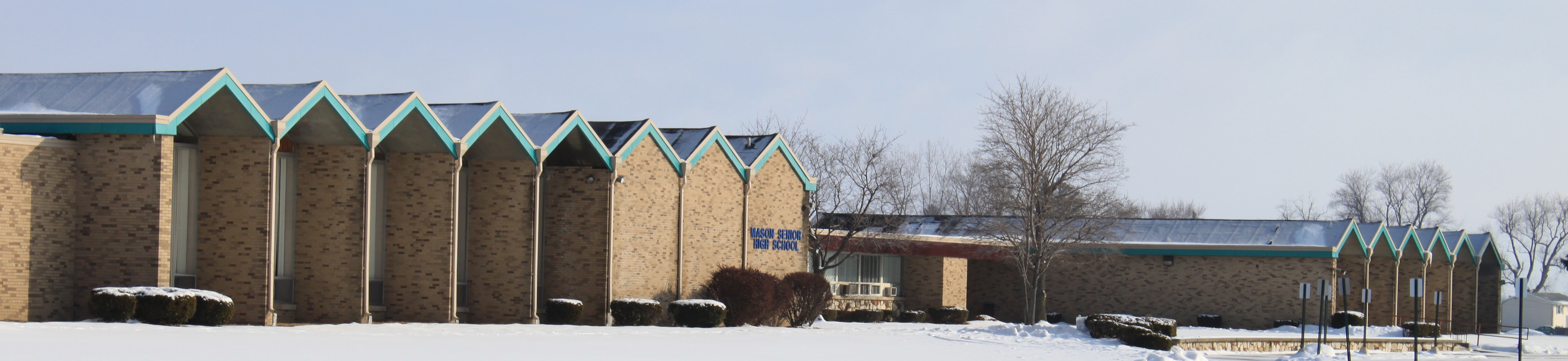
Mason Senior High School

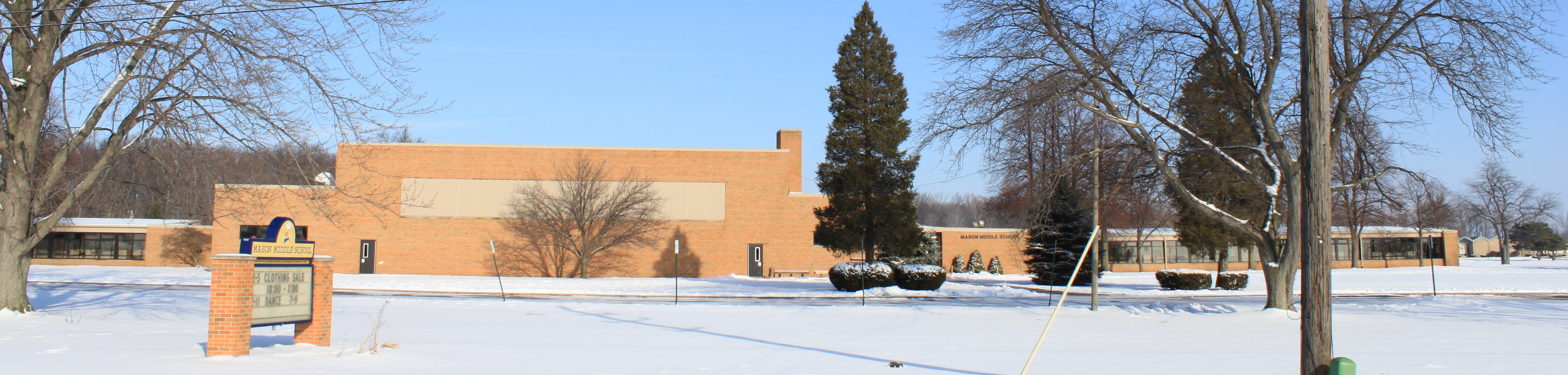
Mason Middle School
