= Lost Peninsula =

- Unincorporated community
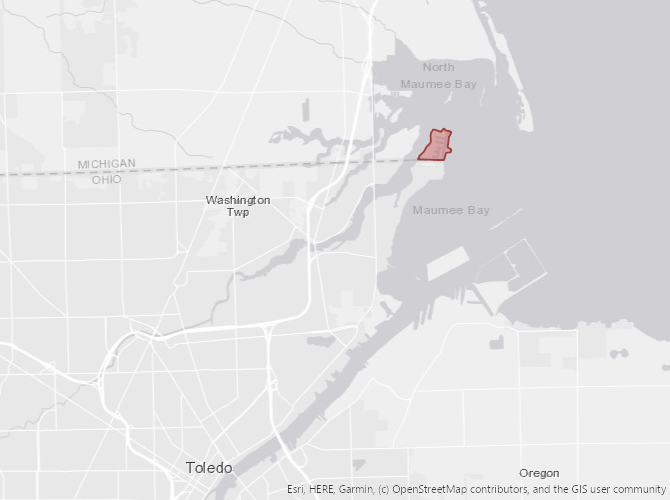
- Southeastern Michigan and northwestern Ohio with the Lost Peninsula area highlighted in red

- Location within the state of Michigan Location within the United States
- Coordinates: 41°44′13″N 83°27′27″W
- Country: United States
- State: Michigan
- County: Monroe
- Township: Erie
- Time zone: UTC-5 (Eastern (EST))
  - Summer (DST): UTC-4 (EDT)
- ZIP Code: 48133 (Erie)
- Area code: 734

The Lost Peninsula is a small exclave of the U.S. state of Michigan. It is part of Monroe County in the southeasternmost corner of the state.

The Lost Peninsula was created as a result of the Toledo War boundary dispute in 1835 and 1836 to determine whether the State of Ohio or the Michigan Territory would control an area known as the Toledo Strip. After the Toledo War, the state border was established at approximately the 41°44’ north latitude line just north of the mouth of the Maumee River. This gave the river and the city of Toledo to the state of Ohio. However, the state line continued across the smaller Ottawa River and divided the peninsula on the far side of the river. The land north of the state line on the far side of the river remained in Michigan, but it no longer had any land connection to the remainder of the state. The area became known as the “Lost Peninsula".

The approximately 140 Michigan residents who live on the small peninsula must travel south on a 10-minute drive into Lucas County, Ohio, then go north to get back to the rest of Michigan. The Lost Peninsula is administered by Erie Township. Public school students must travel through Ohio to attend schools in Michigan.

The peninsula, about 250 acres in area, contains a marina and two restaurants as well as homes.

Two people were killed on the peninsula during the 1965 Palm Sunday tornado outbreak.

In 2005, a proposal to build 300 luxury condominium units on the peninsula was ultimately withdrawn over water-supply issues.

== See also ==
- Turtle Island (Lake Erie) - small island to the northeast, also split between the two states
