= U.S. Route 25 in Michigan =

Former US Highway in Michigan

US Highway 25
- US 25 highlighted in red

Route information
- Maintained by MDSH
- Length: 190.953 mi (307.309 km)
- Existed: November 11, 1926–September 26, 1973
- History: Functionally replaced by I-75, I-94 and M-25

Major junctions
- South end: US 25 near Toledo, Ohio
- US 24 from Monroe to Woodhaven; I-75 in Detroit; M-1 in Detroit; I-94 from Mount Clemens to Port Huron; M-21 near Port Huron; M-46 in Port Sanilac
- North end: M-25 in Port Austin

Location
- Country: United States
- State: Michigan
- Counties: Monroe, Wayne, Macomb, St. Clair, Sanilac, Huron

Highway system
- United States Numbered Highway System; List; Special; Divided; Michigan State Trunkline Highway System; Interstate; US; State; Byways
← Bus. M-24	→ M-25

US Highway 25 (US 25) was a part of the United States Numbered Highway System in the state of Michigan that ran from the Ohio state line near Toledo and ended at the tip of The Thumb in Port Austin. The general routing of this state trunkline highway took it northeasterly from the state line through Monroe and Detroit to Port Huron. Along this southern half, it followed undivided highways and ran concurrently along two freeways, Interstate 75 (I-75) and I-94. Near the foot of the Blue Water Bridge in Port Huron, US 25 turned north and northwesterly along the Lake Huron shoreline to Port Austin.

Created with the initial US Highway System on November 11, 1926, US 25 replaced several previous state highway designations. Some of the preceding highways followed roadways created in the 19th and the early 20th centuries. It initially was only routed as far north as Port Huron; the northern extension to Port Austin happened in 1933. By the end of the 1950s, the entire route was paved. Starting in the early 1960s, segments of I-75 and I-94 were built, and US 25 was shifted to follow them south of Detroit to Port Huron. A business loop was created when the main highway bypassed downtown Port Huron, and then in 1973, the entire designation was removed from the state. The final routing of the highway is still maintained by the state under eight different designations, some unsigned.

== Route description ==
=== State line to Downriver ===
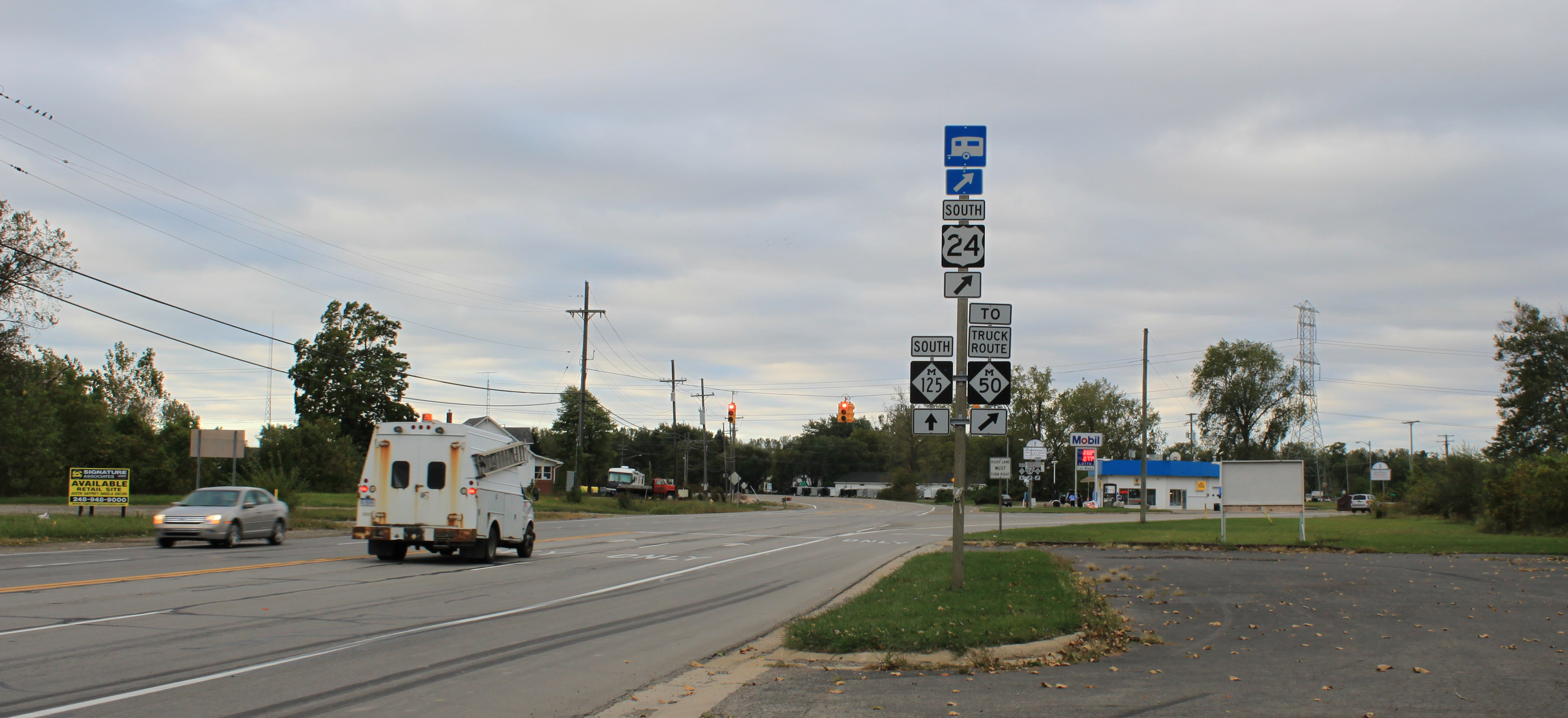
M-125, shown here in September 2010, replaced the southernmost segment of US 25.

In its final configuration before it was decommissioned in the state, US 25 entered Michigan south of Erie and followed Dixie Highway north-northeasterly away from the state line. The highway ran parallel to US 24 (Telegraph Road) about 2/3 mile (1.1 km) to the east of that roadway. At LaSalle, the roadway turned more to the northeast toward Monroe. US 25 then turned back to the north-northeast and followed Monroe Street next to Lake Monroe and through downtown Monroe over the River Raisin. North of town, Dixie Highway turned due north and terminated at an intersection with US 24; US 25 merged onto Telegraph Road, and the two highways ran concurrently northeasterly through rural Monroe County. At the crossing of the Huron River, US 24/US 25 entered Flat Rock and Wayne County.

The highway followed Telegraph Road through downtown Flat Rock and continued into the suburban area of Downriver. At the intersection with Dix–Toledo Road near Woodhaven, US 25 separated from US 24 and continued northeasterly for about two miles (3.2 km) to an interchange with I-75 where it merged onto the freeway. I-75/US 25 continued on the Fisher Freeway through the Downriver suburbs of Taylor, Southgate, Allen Park, Lincoln Park, and Melvindale before entering the city of Detroit. The freeway curved to run east-northeasterly and passed through an industrial area of the city, crossing the River Rouge. At Clark Avenue, US 25 left the freeway to turn a block south and run along Fort Street parallel to I-75. The highway continued along Fort Street running under the approaches to the Ambassador Bridge and into downtown.

=== Downtown Detroit to Port Huron ===
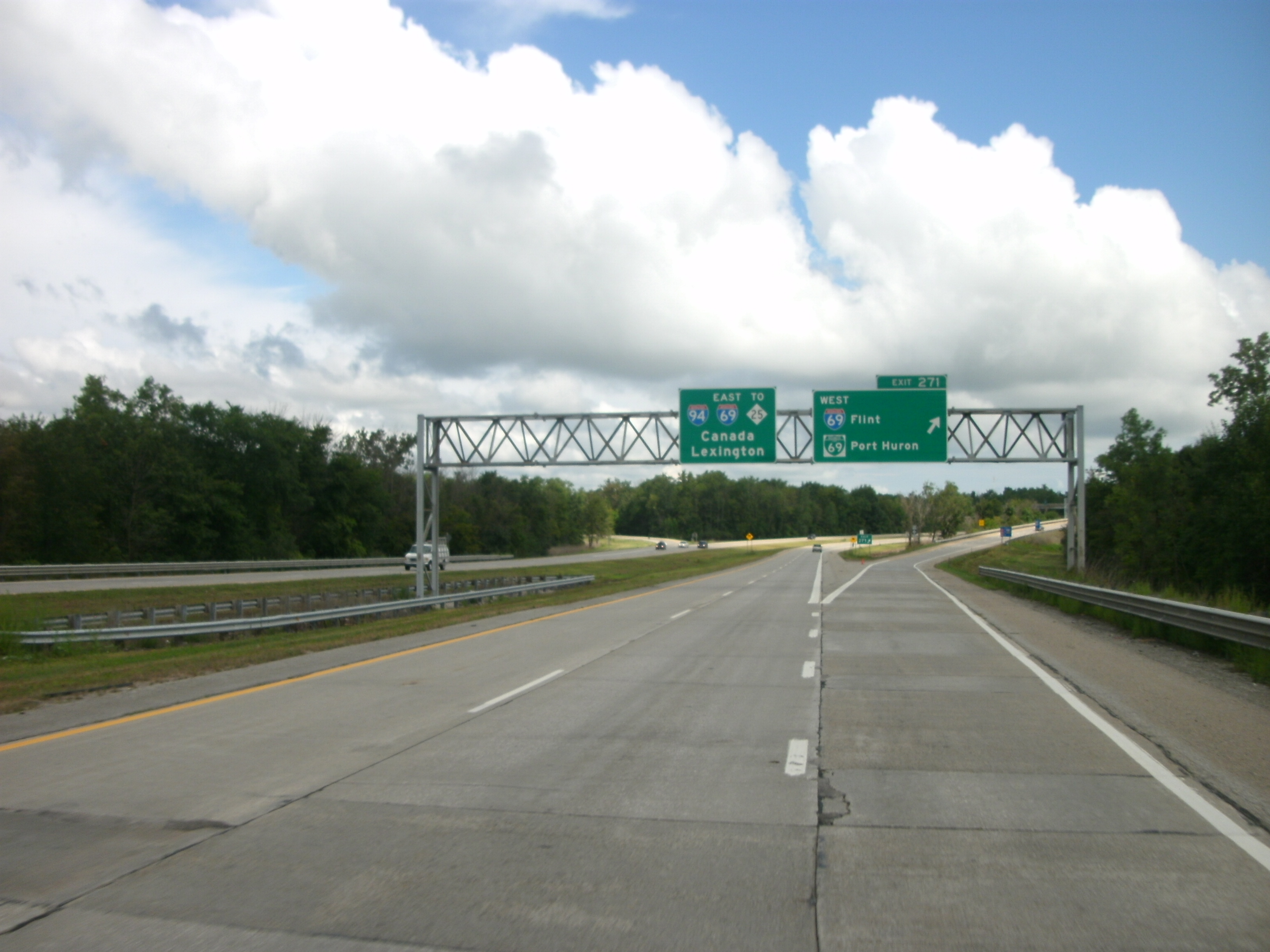
I-94, shown here in August 2012 near Port Huron, replaced part of US 25.

In Downtown Detroit, Fort Street ended at Campus Martius Park at M-1 (Woodward Avenue). US 25 looped around the park and followed the street named Cadillac Square over to Randolph Street, turning north to connect to Gratiot Avenue, a major thoroughfare on the east side of Detroit. The highway followed Gratiot through the east side of Detroit running north-northeasterly. US 25 intersected the eastern end of the there-unnumbered Fisher Freeway. Gratiot Avenue carried the highway through residential neighborhoods and connected it to the Detroit City Airport. East of the airport, the highway intersected the southern end of M-97 as well. At M-102 (8 Mile Road), US 25 exited Detroit and entered East Detroit, a suburb in Macomb County. The highway continued, roughly parallel to I-94 through Roseville and Mount Clemens. At Hall Road near Selfridge Air National Guard Base, M-59 merged with US 25 to follow Gratiot Avenue. At 23 Mile Road west of New Baltimore, US 25/M-59 turned eastward onto 23 Mile to an interchange with I-94. At that interchange, US 25 turned northeasterly onto the I-94 freeway while M-59 terminated; 23 Mile continued eastward as M-29 into New Baltimore.

I-94/US 25 ran northeasterly through rural areas of Macomb County, intersecting the southern end of M-19 near New Haven. The freeway crossed into rural southern St. Clair County south of Richmond and continued northeastward to Marysville, where it turned northward, crossing Gratiot Avenue. A business loop, Business US 25 (Bus. US 25) ran northeasterly from the freeway along Gratiot Avenue to run parallel to the St. Clair River. From Marysville, the freeway skirted the western side of the Port Huron area, intersecting the M-21 freeway immediately east of the city before turning eastward to curve around the north side of town. After the freeway crossed the Black River, US 25 turned northward to separate from I-94.

=== Along Lake Huron ===
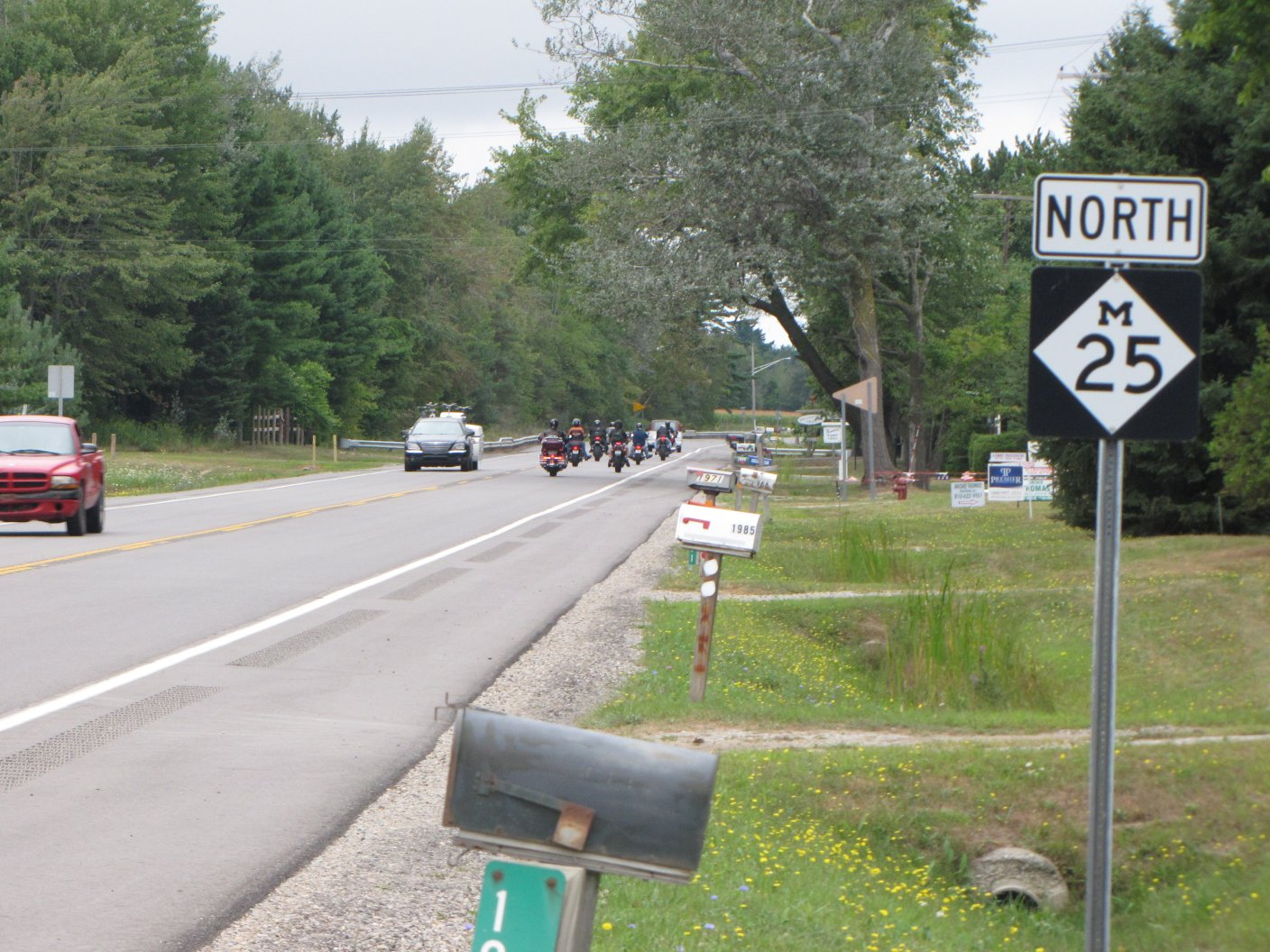
M-25, shown here in August 2010, replaced US 25 north of Port Huron.

North of downtown Port Huron, US 25 followed Pine Grove Avenue to the eastern terminus of M-136 and then followed 24th Avenue out of town. South of Lakeport, the highway changed names to Lakeshore Road and ran along the Lake Huron shoreline in The Thumb region of the state. US 25 stayed close to the shoreline and passed Lakeport State Park in the town of the same name. North of the park, the highway crossed into southern Sanilac County and followed the shoreline to the community of Lexington where it intersected the eastern end of M-90. Further north, the highway intersected the eastern end of M-46 in Port Sanilac.

North of the community of Richmondville, US 25 passed Sanilac State Park, and then north of Forestville, it crossed into Huron County. On the other side of the county line, the highway passed through the community of White Rock and continued along the lake to Harbor Beach. There, US 25 intersected the eastern end of M-142 and began to curve around to the northwest to follow the northern tip of The Thumb. About 8 miles (13 km) north of Harbor Beach, the highway passed through Port Hope and turned even more to the northwest on Lakeshore Road. US 25 turned due west at Huron City and passed south of Grindstone City on Grindstone Road. The highway was further inland on this east–west segment as it ran south of Pointe Aux Barques to Port Austin. At an intersection with M-53 (Van Dyke Road), US 25 merged with M-53 to run five blocks north along Lake Street to the waterfront in Port Austin. At the intersection with Spring Street just south of the marina, US 25/M-53 jointly terminated while M-25 continued westward along Spring Street.

== History ==
=== Before the state highways ===
The chief transportation routes in 1701 were the Indian trails that crossed the future state of Michigan; the one connecting what are now Detroit and Port Huron was one of these 13 trails at the time. Detroit created 120-foot (37 m) rights-of-way for the principal streets of the city, the modern Gratiot Avenue included, in 1805. This street plan was devised by Augustus Woodward and others following a devastating fire in Detroit. Gratiot Avenue, then also called Detroit–Port Huron Road, was authorized by the United States Congress on March 2, 1827, as a supply road from Detroit to Port Huron for Fort Gratiot. Construction started in Detroit in 1829, and the roadway was completed in the same year to Mount Clemens. The rest was finished in 1833. The road was named for the fort near Port Huron, which was in turn named for Colonel Charles Gratiot, the supervising engineer in charge of construction of the structure in the aftermath of the War of 1812.

Telegraph lines were first installed from the Detroit area south to the Monroe area in the mid-19th century with additional lines north to Pontiac completed around 1868. As these communication lines were installed, roadways were added as needed to provide access for maintenance. The parallel road from Dearborn south was named for these lines, becoming Telegraph Road. In 1915, the Dixie Highway, an auto trail that ran south to Miami, Florida, was extended northward to Detroit, and further in 1919 to the Straits of Mackinac.

=== Initial state highways to US Highway ===
When the state highway system was first signed in 1919, five separate highways were designated along US 25's general route from the state line north through Detroit and Port Huron to Port Austin. From the state line north to Monroe, the roadway was given the first M-56 designation. From there northward, there was no state highway that corresponded to the future US 25, but the first M-10 followed the future US 24 into the Detroit area. Near Dearborn, M-10 ran further inland than the future US 25 and included a concurrency with M-17 into Detroit. From Detroit northward, Gratiot Avenue was assigned the M-19 number into the Port Huron area. Through downtown Port Huron, the future US 25 was numbered as the first M-27 and along the lakeshore north to Harbor Beach, the highway was M-31. From Harbor Beach into Port Austin, M-27 took over the route.

When the US Highway System was created on November 11, 1926, US 25 was included in Michigan's section of the system. The US Highway designation was assigned to run along Dixie Highway replacing that segment of M-56. From Monroe northward, US 25 overlapped US 24 on Telegraph Road to the Dearborn area and then followed M-17 (Ecorse Road) to Fort Street and into Downtown Detroit. From there, the highway replaced M-19 to Marysville and overlapped M-29 into Port Huron to an intersection with M-21; the remainder of the highway to Port Austin was numbered M-29 only. The highway was rerouted off Telegraph Road along Dix–Toledo Highway into downtown Detroit in 1929. By the end of 1932, US 25 was rerouted from downtown Monroe along Dixie Highway north to US 24 instead of turning westward in the city. The next year, US 25 was extended northward from Port Huron to Port Austin, replacing that section of M-29 in the process. The remainder of M-29 westward to Bay City was renumbered M-25.

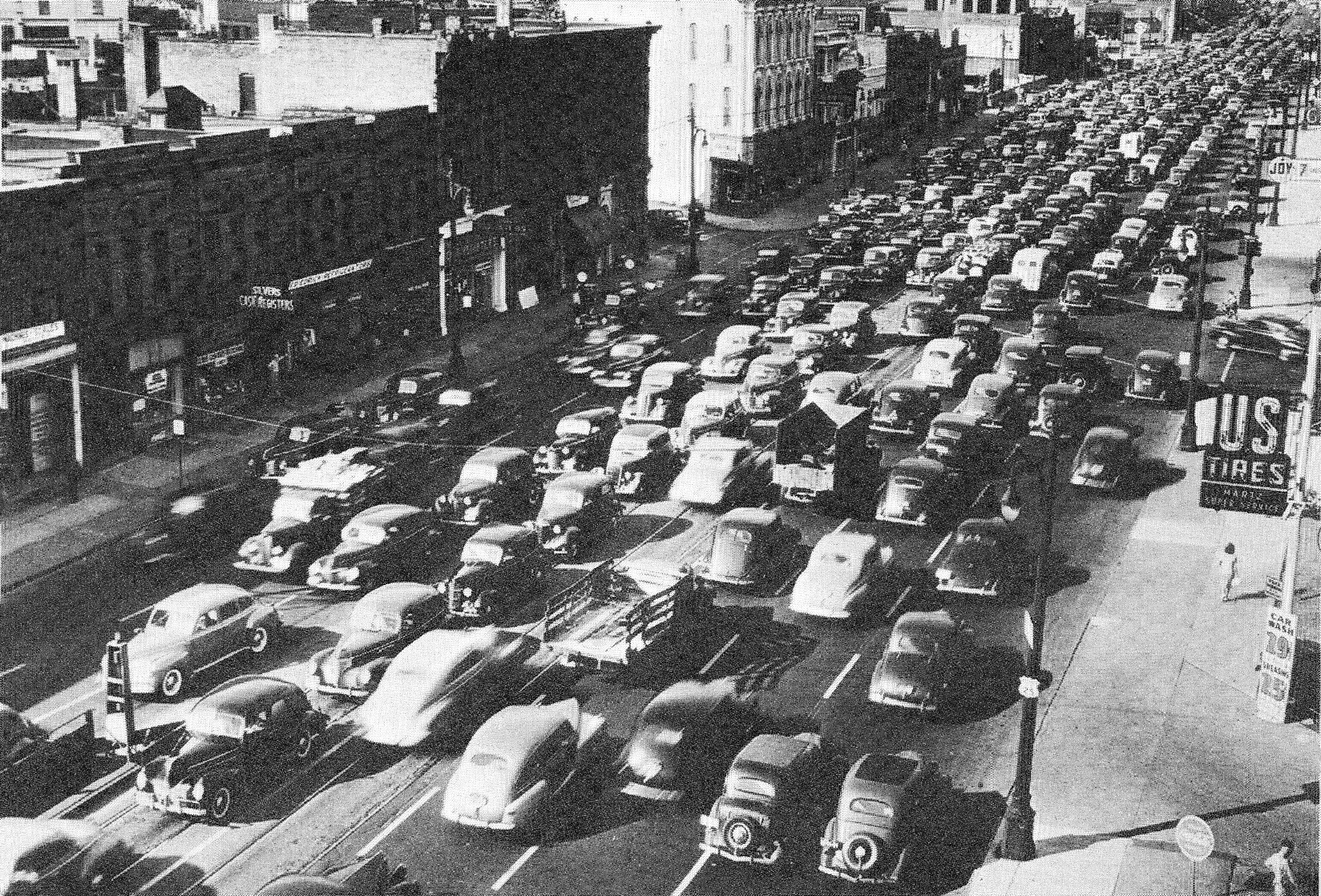
A heavily congested US 25 along Gratiot Avenue in Detroit in 1941

In 1936, US 25 was changed to traffic along a one-way pairing of streets on the southwest side of Port Huron. Northbound traffic remained on Military Avenue while southbound traffic was diverted to Electric Avenue. Two US 25A routings were created in the late 1930s and early 1940s. The first, near Erie, was numbered in 1937, and renumbered US 24A by 1945. The second in Port Huron provided access to the Blue Water Bridge from the mainline of the highway starting in 1940. That last segment of US 25 to be paved was completed near Port Hope at the end of the 1950s.

=== Freeway era ===
With the completion of a segment of I-94 between Roseville and Marysville in 1963, US 25 was rerouted to follow I-94 from the Mount Clemens area north to Marysville. The next year, an additional freeway from the northern end of I-94 at Marysville to Port Huron was completed. I-94/US 25 was extended north and east, replacing part of M-146 to the Blue Water Bridge. The former route of US 25 through downtown was redesignated Bus. US 25 while US 25A became a part of the mainline highway to connect to I-94. In 1967, another segment, this time south of Detroit, was rerouted to follow another freeway, I-75.

Six years later, the US 25 designation was decommissioned in Michigan, although all sections of it are still state highways. The southern section from the state line northward through Monroe was renumbered M-125 and the US 25 designation was removed from US 24 (Telegraph Road). In the Detroit area, the connection between US 24 and I-75 in Woodhaven was redesignated as an unsigned connector highway (now Connector 24). The US 25 designation was removed from I-75 northward into Detroit, while the routing along Clark Street became another unsigned connector highway (now Connector 850). The routing along Fort Street and Gratiot Avenue was numbered as M-3. The US 25 designation was removed from I-94, and the routing through Port Huron and northward to Port Austin became part of an extended M-25. One segment of highway near Port Huron became an unsigned highway now designated Connector 25.

== Major intersections ==
All exits are unnumbered.

County	Location	mi	km	Destinations	Notes
Monroe	Erie Township	0.000	0.000	US 25 south – Toledo	Continuation into Ohio
Monroe	Monroe	14.776	23.780	M-50 west – Jackson	Southern end of M-50 concurrency
Monroe	Monroe	14.916	24.005	M-50 east to I-75	Northern end of M-50 concurrency
Monroe	Frenchtown Township	19.480	31.350	US 24 south (Telegraph Road) – Toledo	Southern end of US 24 concurrency
Wayne	Brownstown Township	31.979	51.465	US 24 north (Telegraph Road) – Detroit	Northern end of US 24 concurrency
Wayne	Brownstown Township	34.007	54.729	I-75 south – Monroe	Southern end of I-75 concurrency
Wayne	Taylor	35.018	56.356	To US 24 (Telegraph Road)	Northbound exit and southbound entrance
Wayne	Taylor	36.185	58.234	Eureka Road	
Wayne	Taylor–Southgate city line	37.024– 37.535	59.584– 60.407	Allen Road, Northline Road	
Wayne	Lincoln Park	40.009	64.388	Dix Highway	No access from southbound I-75/US 25 to northbound Dix Highway, northbound Dix Highway to southbound I-75/US 25, or southbound Dix Highway to northbound I-75/US 25
Wayne	Lincoln Park	40.910– 40.935	65.838– 65.878	M-39 (Southfield Road)	
Wayne	Melvindale	42.051	67.675	Outer Drive	
Wayne	Detroit	43.223	69.561	M-85 (Fort Street) / Schaefer Highway	Northern terminus of M-85
Wayne	Detroit	45.086	72.559	Dearborn Avenue	Northbound exit and southbound entrance
Wayne	Detroit	45.818	73.737	Fort Street, Springwells Avenue	
Wayne	Detroit	46.708	75.169	Livernois Avenue	
Wayne	Detroit	47.276	76.083	I-75 north – Detroit; Clark Avenue	Northern end of I-75 concurrency; US 25 followed Clark Avenue off the freeway
Wayne	Detroit	49.375	79.461	M-1 (Woodward Avenue)	
Wayne	Detroit	50.773– 50.811	81.711– 81.772	I-75 south (Fisher Freeway) to I-75 north / I-375 south – Toledo	
Wayne	Detroit	53.288	85.759	M-53 north (Van Dyke Avenue)	
Wayne	Detroit	54.254– 54.265	87.313– 87.331	I-94 – Detroit, Port Huron	
Wayne	Detroit	55.572	89.434	M-97 north (Gunston Avenue)	
Wayne–Macomb county line	Detroit–East Detroit city line	54.740	88.095	M-102 (8 Mile Road)	8 Mile Road is the county line
Macomb	Roseville	64.657– 64.746	104.055– 104.199	To I-94 west – Detroit	Northbound entrance and southbound exit only
Macomb	Mount Clemens	72.489– 72.529	116.660– 116.724	M-59 west (Hall Road) – Pontiac	Southern end of M-59 concurrency
Macomb	Chesterfield Township	76.527– 76.557	123.158– 123.207	I-94 west – Detroit M-59 west – Pontiac M-29 north (23 Mile Road) – New Baltimore	Southern end of I-94 concurrency; northern end of M-59 concurrency roadway continues beyond I-94 as M-29
Macomb	Chesterfield Township	79.641	128.170	M-19 north – Richmond, New Haven	Eastbound exit and westbound entrance; southern terminus of M-19
Macomb	Lenox Township	81.096	130.511	26 Mile Road – Marine City	
St. Clair	Casco–Columbus township line	90.089	144.984	Richmond, St. Clair	Connects to Fred W. Moore Highway
St. Clair	St. Clair Township	95.035	152.944	Wadhams Road	
St. Clair	Kimball Township	99.234	159.702	Bus. US 25 north (Gratiot Road) – Marysville	Southern terminus of Bus. US 25
St. Clair	Kimball–Port Huron township line	102.429	164.843	Range Road, Dove Street	
St. Clair	Port Huron Township	104.175– 104.724	167.653– 168.537	M-21 – Flint, Port Huron	
St. Clair	Port Huron Township	106.730	171.765	Water Street, Lapeer Avenue – Port Huron	Indirect access to Lapeer Avenue via Lapeer Connector (former M-146)
St. Clair	Port Huron	108.009	173.824	I-94 east	Northern end of I-94 concurrency
St. Clair	Port Huron	109.602	176.387	M-136 west (Pine Grove Avenue)	Eastern terminus of M-136
Sanilac	Lexington	125.092	201.316	M-90 west (Huron Avenue)	Eastern terminus of M-90
Sanilac	Port Sanilac	136.458	219.608	M-46 west (Main Street)	Eastern terminus of M-46
Huron	Harbor Beach	165.989	267.133	M-142 west (State Street)	Eastern terminus of M-142
Huron	Port Austin	190.615	306.765	M-53 south (Lake Street)	Southern end of M-53 concurrency
Huron	Port Austin	190.953	307.309	M-53 south (Lake Street) M-25 west (Spring Street) – Bay City	Northern end of M-53 concurrency; northern terminus of M-53 and eastern terminus of M-25
1.000 mi = 1.609 km; 1.000 km = 0.621 mi: Concurrency terminus; Incomplete access

== Related trunklines ==
There were three additional trunkline highways related to US 25 in Michigan, two alternate routes and a business loop.

=== Erie alternate route ===
US Highway 25A
- Location: Erie
- Length: 5.111 mi (8.225 km)
- Existed: 1937–1945

US Highway 25A (US 25) was an alternate route that started at the Michigan–Ohio state line south of Erie and ran northward along Summit Street to an intersection with US 25 near Erie. The highway was designated in 1937, and it was replaced by US 24A in 1945. The southern half of the highway was later designated as part of I-75 in 1959, and the northern half is now an unsigned highway designated Connector 75 by MDOT.

=== Port Huron alternate route ===
US Highway 25A
- Location: Port Huron
- Length: 2.481 mi (3.993 km)
- Existed: 1940–1963

US Highway 25A (US 25A) was an alternate route near Port Huron that provided a connection to the Blue Water Bridge to Canada. The highway split from its parent north of Port Huron and followed 24th Avenue south to connect to M-51 (Pine Grove Avenue) while US 25 followed Lakeshore Road and Gratiot Avenue into Port Huron. The parent highway crossed under the approaches to the Blue Water Bridge, and the alternate route, along with M-51, provided a signed path between US 25 and the bridge. The designation was created in early 1940 and was deleted when US 25 was rerouted in 1963 through Port Huron and over the alternate route.

=== Port Huron business loop ===
Business US Highway 25
- Location: Port Huron
- Length: 8.382 mi (13.490 km)
- Existed: 1963–1973

Business US 25 (Bus. US 25) was an 8.4-mile-long (13.5 km) business loop serving the cities of Marysville and Port Huron. It started southwest of Marysville near St. Clair County International Airport at I-94/US 25 and ran northeasterly along Gratiot Avenue into Marysville. It then passed through the city's downtown area and turned northward along Gratiot Boulevard near the St. Clair River. North of Ravenswood Road, Bus. US 25 split into the one-way pairing of Military Street (northbound) and Electric Avenue (southbound) until the two directions merged on the south side of Port Huron. The business loop continued northward along through downtown Port Huron and across the Black River near its mouth. North of the river. the business loop followed Huron Avenue through the northern side of downtown Port Huron and turned northwesterly onto Pine Grove Avenue. The business loop passed under the approaches to the Blue Water Bridge before terminating at an intersection with US 25.

In 1963, the route of US 25 through the Port Huron area was realigned. In the process, that highway replaced its alternate route, and the former alignment through downtown was redesignated as a business loop. This arrangement lasted until 1973 when US 25 itself was decommissioned in Michigan. The former routing of Bus. US 25 through downtown Port Huron became part of an extended M-25. In 1986, the former business loop was redesignated Business Loop I-94.

== See also ==
US Highway 25
Previous state: Ohio	Michigan	Next state: Terminus
