= Erie Aerodrome =

Airport in Michigan, US

- IATA: none; ICAO: none; FAA LID: M84

Summary
- Airport type: Public
- Owner: Howard J. Crowe
- Serves: Erie, Michigan
- Elevation AMSL: 605 ft / 184 m
- Coordinates: 41°46′58″N 083°31′04″W
- Interactive map of Erie Aerodrome

Runways
| Direction | Length | | Surface |
| Direction | ft | m | Surface |
|---|---|---|---|
| 18/36 | 2,670 | 814 | Turf |

Statistics (2008)
- Aircraft operations: 200
- Based aircraft: 4
- Source: Federal Aviation Administration

Erie Aerodrome (FAA LID: M84) is a privately owned public-use airport located one nautical mile (2 km) southwest of the central business district of Erie, in Monroe County, Michigan, United States.

== Facilities and aircraft ==
Erie Aerodrome covers an area of 29 acres (12 ha) at an elevation of 605 feet (184 m) above mean sea level. It has one runway designated 18/36 with a turf surface measuring 2,670 by 80 feet (814 x 24 m).

For the 12-month period ending December 31, 2008, the airport had 200 general aviation aircraft operations, an average of 17 per month. At that time there were 4 aircraft based at this airport: 50% single-engine and 50% ultralight.

== Current usage ==
As of January 2017, the airport is not in use and is most likely abandoned. Airnav data for the airport has M84 not listed, along with the FAA registry not listing M84 as an active facility as of January 5, 2017.
