= The Mall of Monroe =

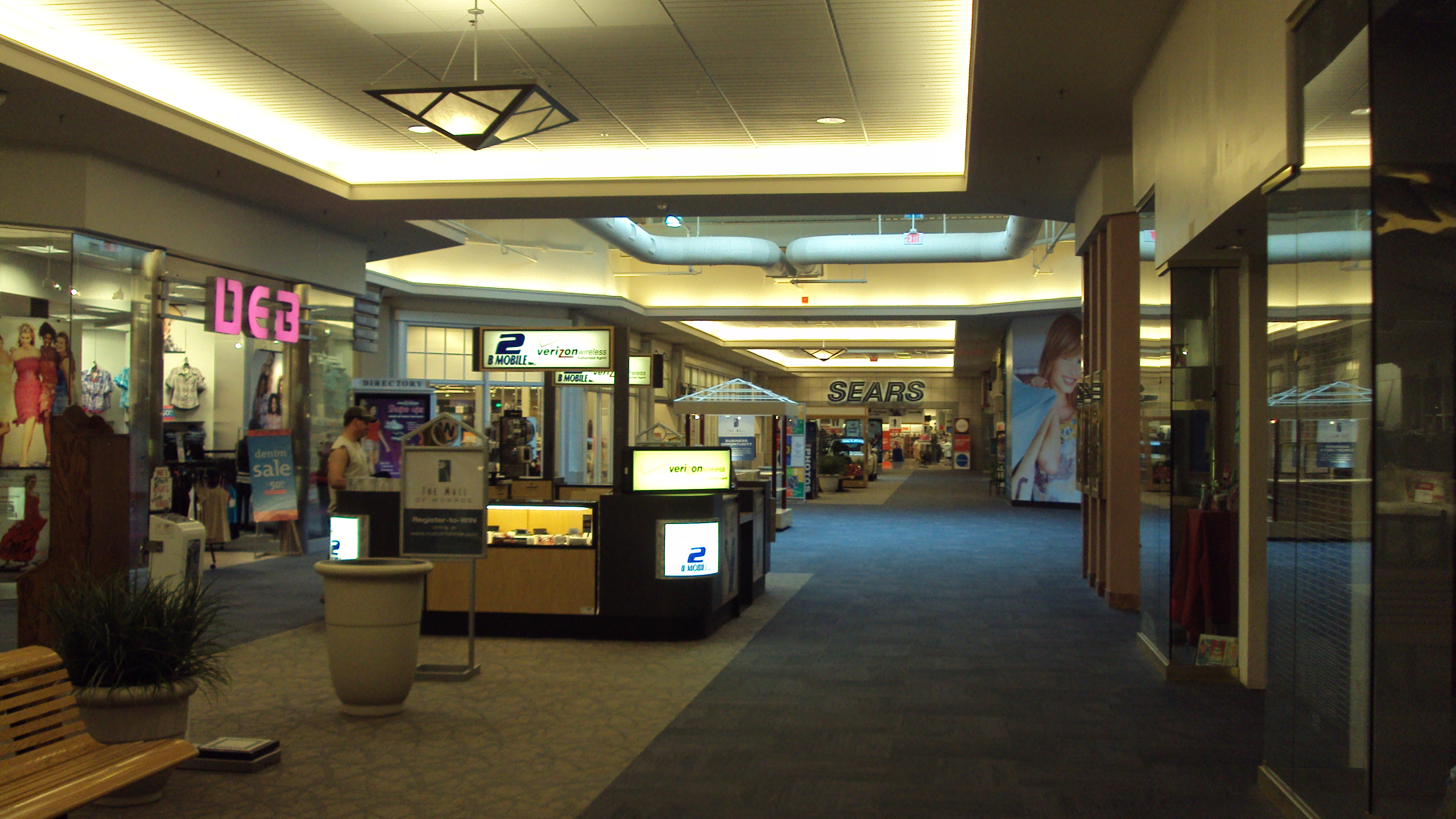
- Interior hallway in the Mall of Monroe in 2010
- Location: Frenchtown Charter Township, Michigan, United States
- Coordinates: 41°56′49″N 83°23′16″W
- Address: 2121 North Monroe Street (M-125)
- Opened: 1988
- Developer: Cafaro Company
- Manager: Cafaro Company
- Owner: Warner Management
- Num. of stores: 30+
- Num. of anchor tenants: 7 (3 open, 4 vacant)
- Floor area: GLA: 620,411 ft² (57,638 m²)
- Floors: 1
- Public transit: Lake Erie Transit
- Website: Official website

The Mall of Monroe, formerly known as Frenchtown Square Mall, is an enclosed shopping mall in Frenchtown Charter Township in the U.S. state of Michigan. It is located just north of the city of Monroe along North Monroe Street (M-125). Opened in 1988, the mall features more than thirty tenants and a church. The mall is managed by Cafaro Company of Youngstown, Ohio. The mall's anchor stores are Planet Fitness, Phoenix Theatres, and Domka Outdoors. There are vacant anchor stores that were once Target, Sears, and Pat Catan's.

== History ==
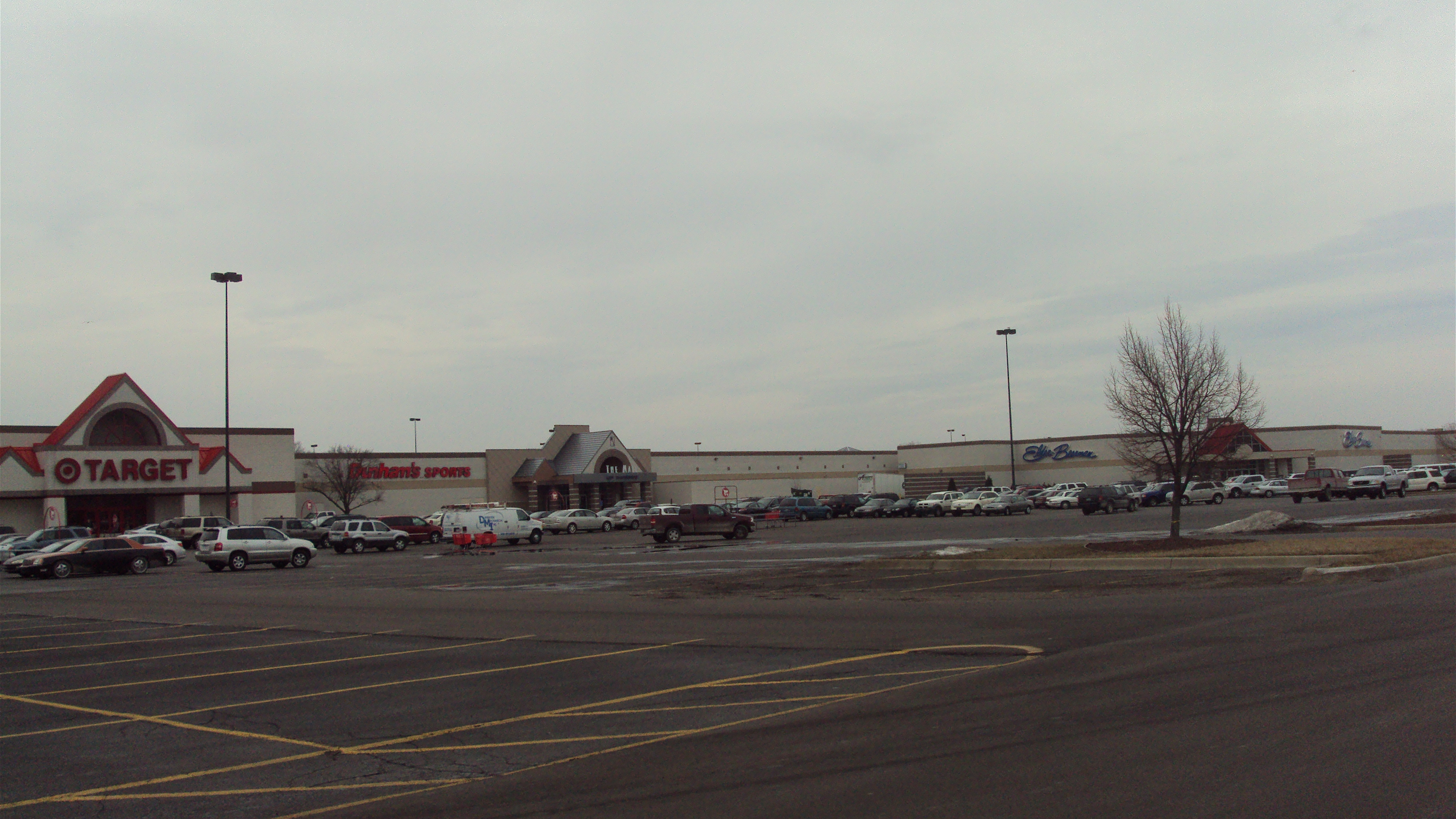
Exterior of the Mall of Monroe in 2010

Frenchtown Square Mall opened in 1988 on M-125 (Monroe Street) north of Monroe, in Frenchtown Charter Township. Its original anchor stores included the first Phar-Mor discount pharmacy in Michigan, as well as JCPenney, Sears, Hills, and Elder-Beerman. Hills closed in 1993 and was replaced with Target, while the closure of Phar-Mor in 1995 made way for an Elder-Beerman home store, as well as an OfficeMax which did not open out into the mall. Old Navy was eventually added as well.

OfficeMax closed in the early 2000s. JCPenney closed in 2004 and was replaced two years later by Steve & Barry's. The mall's Regal Cinemas movie theater complex was closed in August 2007, but re-opened three months later under the management of Phoenix Theatres. Steve & Barry's closed in late 2008, as did Old Navy. Sears announced the closure of the Mall of Monroe store in late 2011.

Cafaro announced $2 million renovation plans for the mall in 2009. Among the renovation plans, the former Old Navy was replaced with a clothing store called Wear District, and the mall was renamed The Mall of Monroe. Also, both Elder-Beerman stores were rebranded as Carson's. An expo center opened in 2013, replacing the former JCPenney/Steve & Barry's. Planet Fitness replaced the vacant OfficeMax in 2014. The expo center was closed in 2014 and replaced with a Pat Catan's craft store, which moved from an existing location in Monroe. Target announced in late 2014 that it would close the Mall of Monroe store in early 2015. In late 2015, Family & Friends Funland opened in the former Old Navy. In 2016, Phoenix Theatres added 4 screens, eliminating the food court. In 2018, both Carson's stores closed as part of a chainwide liquidation. In 2019, Monroe City Church opened in the former Carson's Home Store. In addition, Pat Catan's closed in September 2019 with no plans to reopen as a Michael's. In 2019, River Raisin Crossfit opened in a space near the former Target previously occupied by Dunham's Sports and rue21, and in 2020, Leviathan, a local marketing company, will occupy the spaces between the former Target and Pat Catan's.

In 2021 the former Target location was sold to Richmond Main LLC which will use the building for an auto parts business.

== Frenchtown Square Partnership v. Lemstone, Inc. ==
In 2003, the mall partnership sued Lemstone Books, a Christian bookstore chain, which had closed its store at the mall six months before the termination of its lease. In those six months, the chain did not pay rent. Lemstone had also claimed that another gift store in the mall had caused declining sales at the Frenchtown Square store.
