= La Salle Township, Michigan =

- Civil township
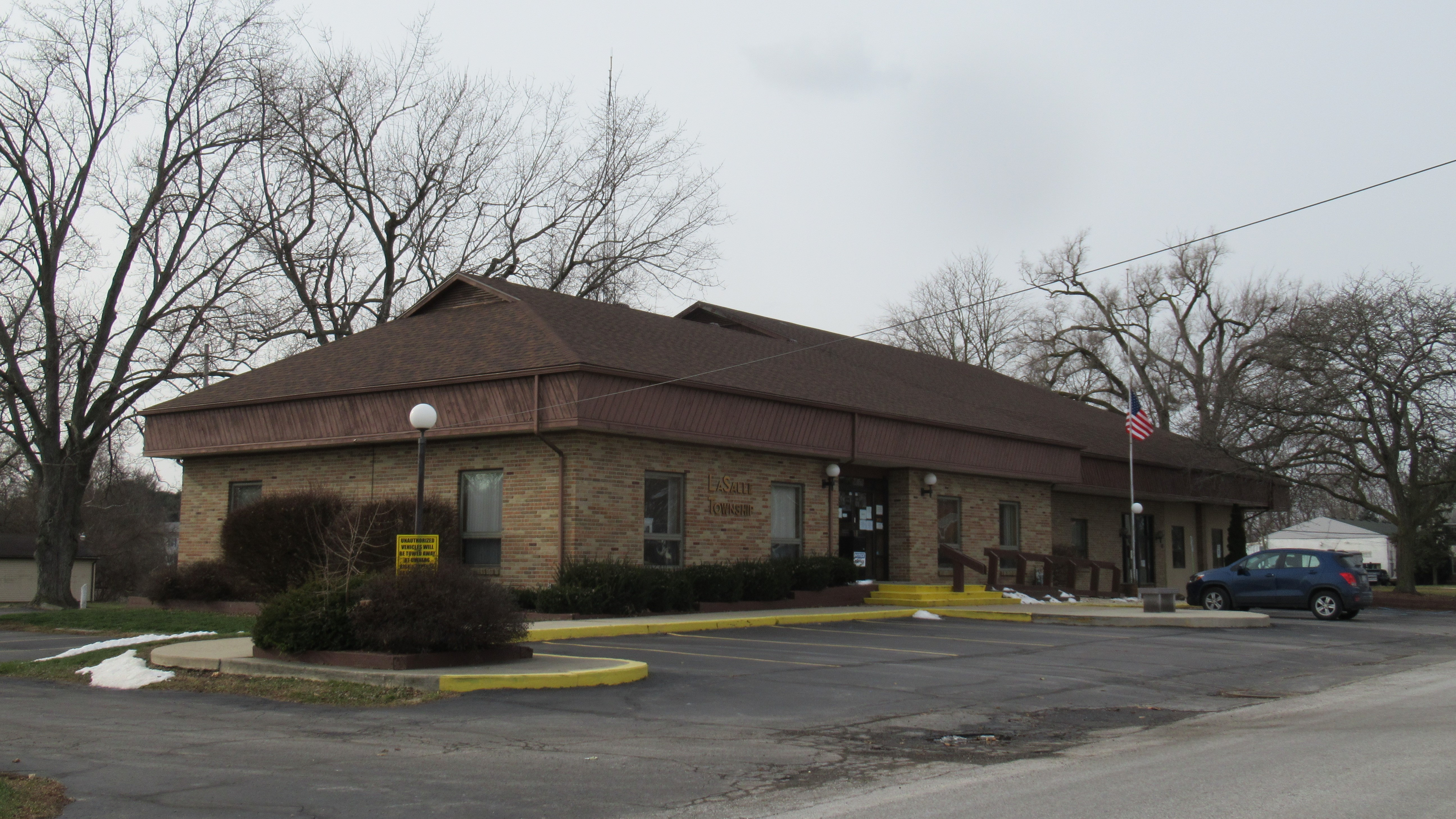
- La Salle Township Hall

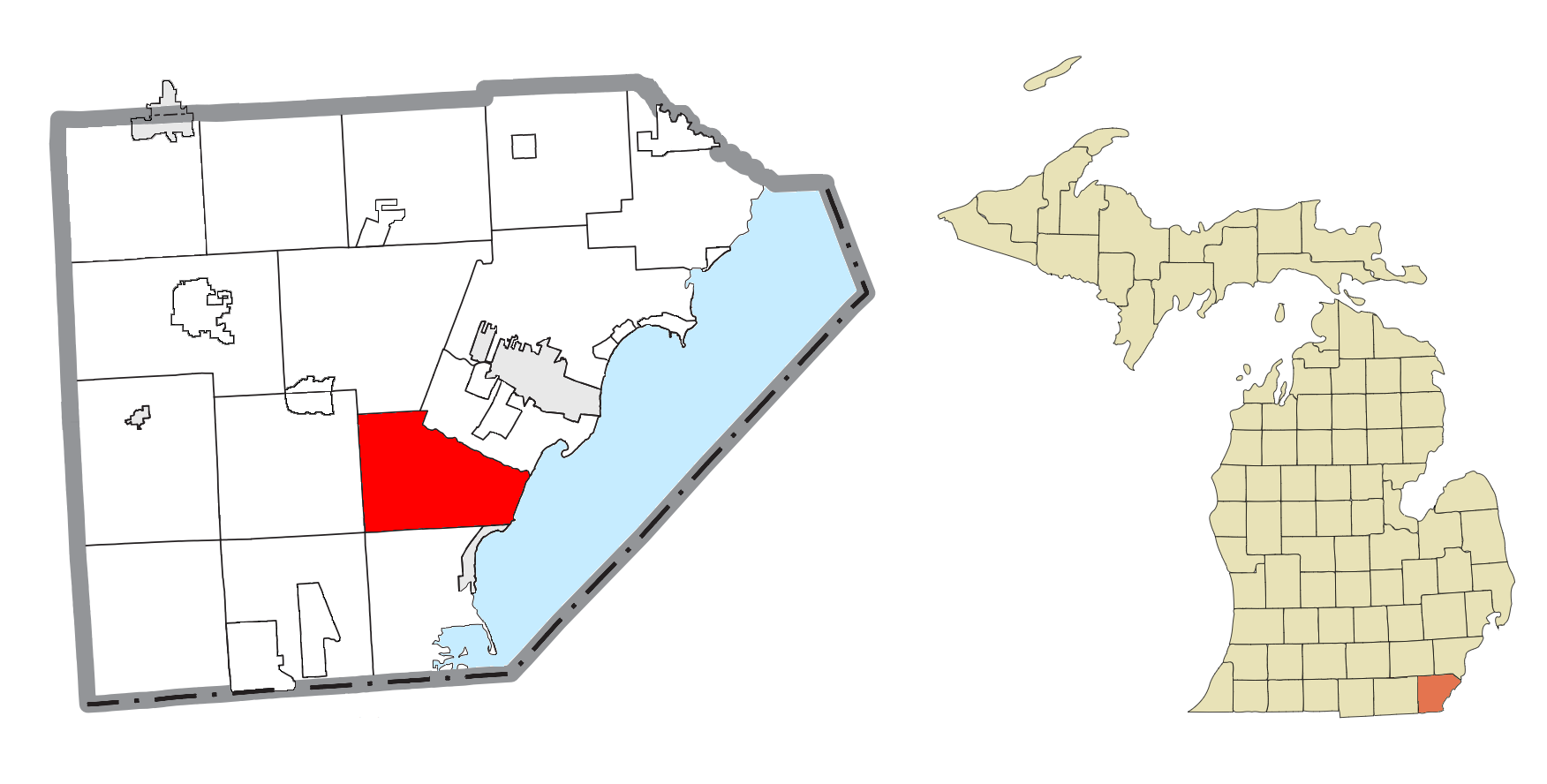
- Location within Monroe County and the state of Michigan

- Location within Michigan Location within the United States
- Coordinates: 41°50′39″N 83°27′32″W
- Country: United States
- State: Michigan
- County: Monroe
- Established: 1836

Government
  - Supervisor: Aaron Goldsmith
  - Clerk: LaDeana Morr

Area
  - Total: 26.86 sq mi (69.57 km^{2})
  - Land: 26.57 sq mi (68.82 km^{2})
  - Water: 0.29 sq mi (0.75 km^{2})
- Elevation: 604 ft (184 m)

Population (2020)
  - Total: 4,639
  - Density: 174.6/sq mi (67.4/km^{2})
- Time zone: UTC-5 (Eastern (EST))
  - Summer (DST): UTC-4 (EDT)
- ZIP Codes: 48145 (La Salle); 48133 (Erie); 48161 (Monroe); 48140 (Ida); 48182 (Temperance)
- Area code: 734
- FIPS code: 26-115-46260
- GNIS feature ID: 1626593
- Website: lasalletwpmi.com

La Salle Township is a civil township of Monroe County in the U.S. state of Michigan. The population was 4,639 at the 2020 census.

== Communities ==
- Grand View is an unincorporated community along the shores of Lake Erie at 41°50′31″N 83°24′10″W.
- Hillcrest Orchard is an unincorporated community located within the township at 41°50′58″N 83°28′36″W.
- La Salle is an unincorporated community centered at 41°52′04″N 83°27′09″W in the northern portion of the township at the intersection of South Dixie Highway (M-125) and LaPlaisance Road–North Otter Creek Road. The community was first settled as early as 1831. A post office operated briefly from April 1832 to December 5, 1833. The post office was reestablished on May 21, 1834, and remains in operation. The La Salle 48145 ZIP Code serves most of the township.
- Morocco is a former community located in the southwestern portion of the township. A rural post office operated here from October 30, 1884 until October 15, 1906. Morocco can be seen within the township on a 1911 map of Monroe County.
- North Shores is an unincorporated community along Lake Erie just south of Grand View at 41°50′11″N 83°24′27″W.
- Toledo Beach is a former community located along the shores of Lake Erie just south of North Shores. It was settled as a summer resort and also had a station along the Toledo, O.B. & N. Railroad. Previously, the area was called the Ottawa Beach Resort until it was purchased by the Toledo Rail Light and Power Company, and the 400-acre (1.62 km^{2}) Toledo Beach Amusement Park was built in 1907. A post office began operating on May 29, 1915. The amusement park prospered and was accessible by a trolley line from Toledo, Ohio. The line ran through several lakefront communities leading to Toledo Beach until the line was shut down in 1927. By 1950, the park contained many attractions, a dance hall, train rides, and numerous other amenities. Financial hardships forced the closure and selling of the park, in which it was demolished and replaced with the Toledo Beach Marina in 1962.
- Winchester is a former settlement located in the township at the mouth of Otter Creek at Lake Erie. It may have been named after James Winchester, who was a general whose militia protected the area during the War of 1812. The community and post office can be seen on a historic 1876 map of La Salle Township.

== Geography ==
La Salle Township is in eastern Monroe County, about 5 miles (8 km) southwest of Monroe, the county seat. Its eastern boundary is the shore of Lake Erie. According to the U.S. Census Bureau, the township has a total area of 26.86 square miles (69.57 km^{2}), of which 26.57 square miles (68.82 km^{2}) are land and 0.29 square miles (0.75 km^{2}), or 1.07%, are water. The township is drained mainly by Otter Creek, which passes through the community of La Salle, and by Sulphur Creek and Muddy Creek to the south. Woodchuck Creek forms the northeast border of the township. All four creeks flow to Lake Erie.

=== Major highways ===
- I-75 runs southwest–northeast through the eastern section of township and has one access point along South Otter Creek Road (exit 9).
- US 24 (Telegraph Road) runs south–north through the center of the township.
- M-125 (S. Dixie Highway) runs parallel to US 24.
- US 25 is a former U.S. highway from 1926–1973 that is now replaced with M-125.

== Demographics ==
Historical population
Census	Pop.	Note	%±
1850	1,100		—
1860	1,327		20.6%
1870	1,392		4.9%
1880	1,506		8.2%
1890	1,315		−12.7%
1900	1,320		0.4%
1910	1,293		−2.0%
1920	1,269		−1.9%
1930	1,627		28.2%
1940	1,718		5.6%
1950	2,450		42.6%
1960	3,672		49.9%
1970	4,151		13.0%
1980	5,011		20.7%
1990	4,985		−0.5%
2000	5,001		0.3%
2010	4,894		−2.1%
2020	4,639		−5.2%
U.S. Decennial Census

As of the census of 2000, there were 5,001 people, 1,765 households, and 1,440 families residing in the township. The population density was 187.7 inhabitants per square mile (72.5/km^{2}). There were 1,852 housing units at an average density of 69.5 per square mile (26.8/km^{2}). The racial makeup of the township was 97.96% White, 0.36% African American, 0.40% Native American, 0.26% Asian, 0.28% from other races, and 0.74% from two or more races. Hispanic or Latino of any race were 2.32% of the population.

There were 1,765 households, out of which 35.6% had children under the age of 18 living with them, 72.2% were married couples living together, 6.3% had a female householder with no husband present, and 18.4% were non-families. 14.9% of all households were made up of individuals, and 5.9% had someone living alone who was 65 years of age or older. The average household size was 2.83 and the average family size was 3.16.

In the township the population was spread out, with 25.4% under the age of 18, 7.7% from 18 to 24, 29.2% from 25 to 44, 27.4% from 45 to 64, and 10.2% who were 65 years of age or older. The median age was 38 years. For every 100 females, there were 106.5 males. For every 100 females age 18 and over, there were 103.1 males.

The median income for a household in the township was $63,693, and the median income for a family was $69,000. Males had a median income of $51,884 versus $30,875 for females. The per capita income for the township was $24,237. About 2.6% of families and 3.6% of the population were below the poverty line, including 2.6% of those under age 18 and 6.2% of those age 65 or over.

== Education ==
La Salle Township is served by three separate public school districts. The northern portion is served by Monroe Public Schools. The southern portion is served by Mason Consolidated Schools, and small sections along the western border are served by Ida Public Schools.

== Images ==
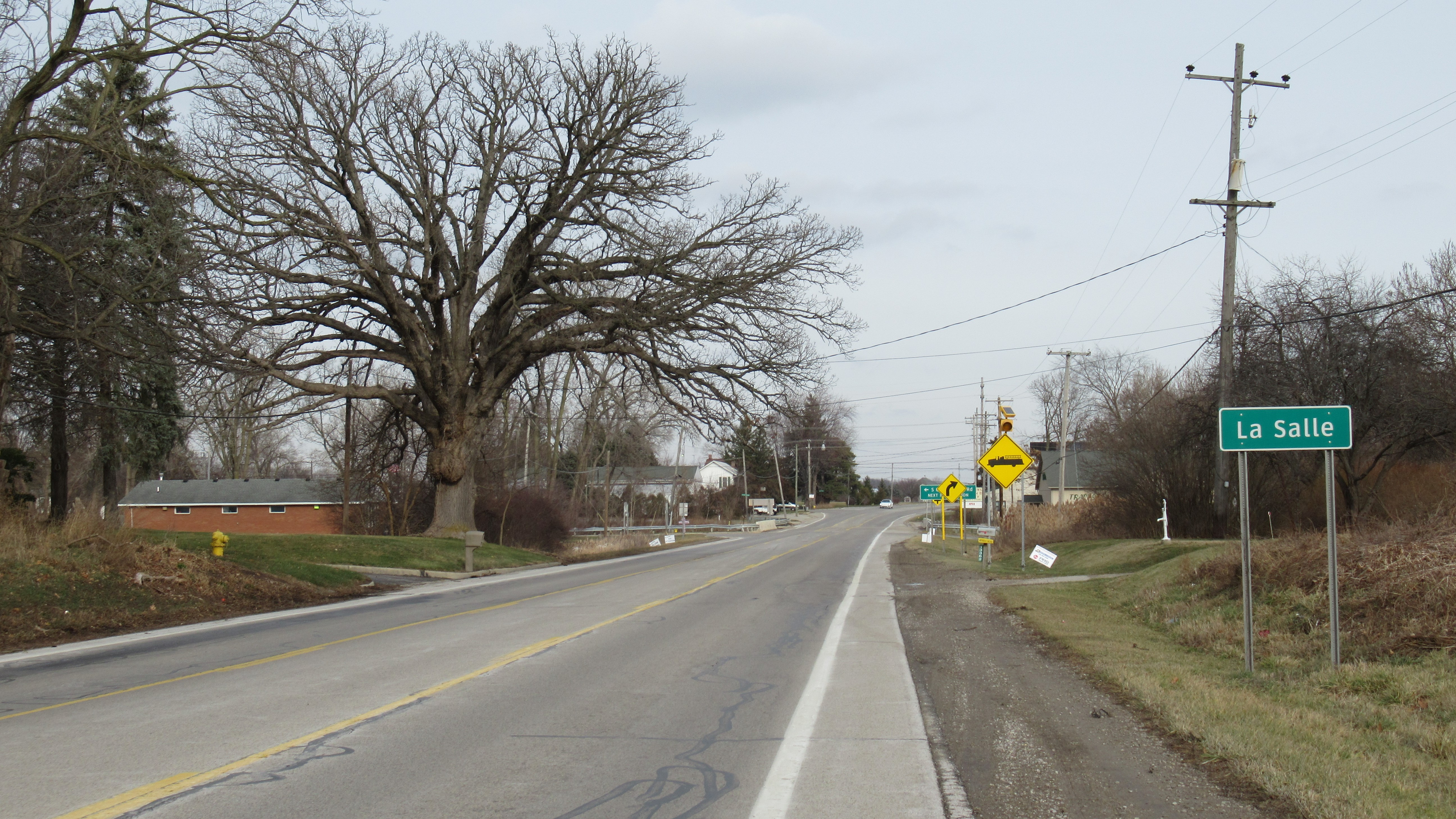
Community of La Salle along M-125

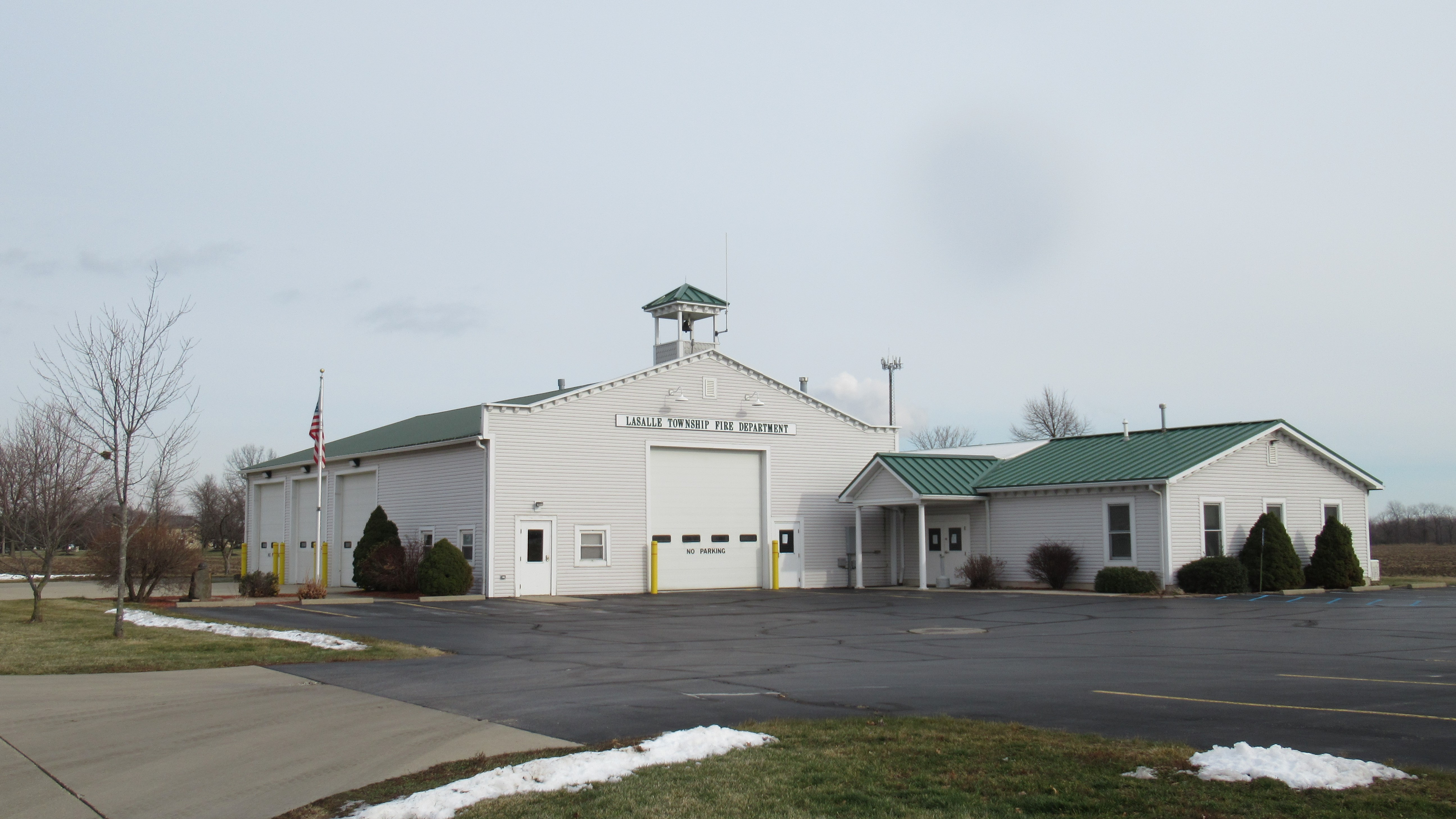
La Salle Township Fire Department

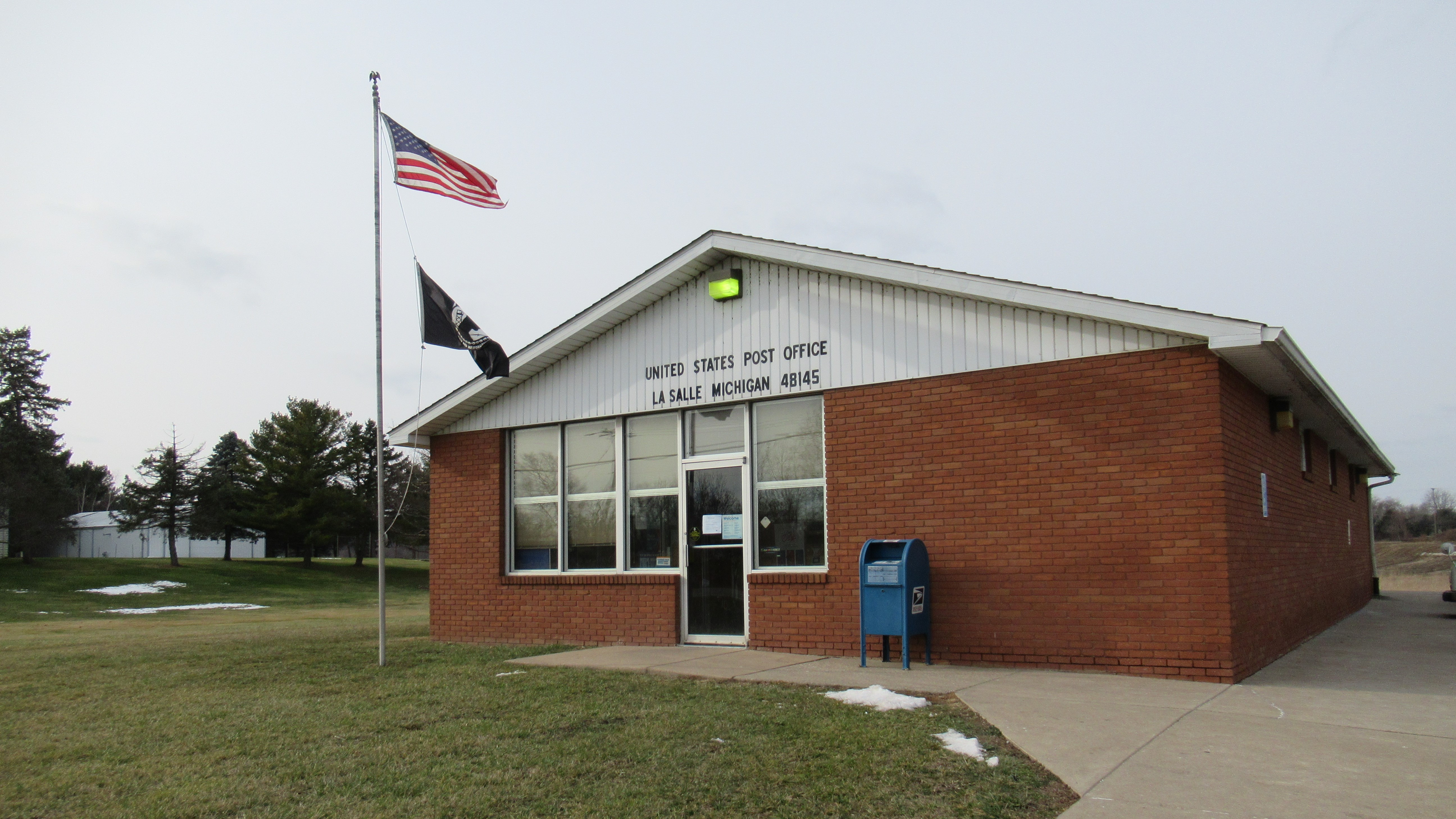
U.S. Post Office in La Salle
