= Luna Pier, Michigan =

- City
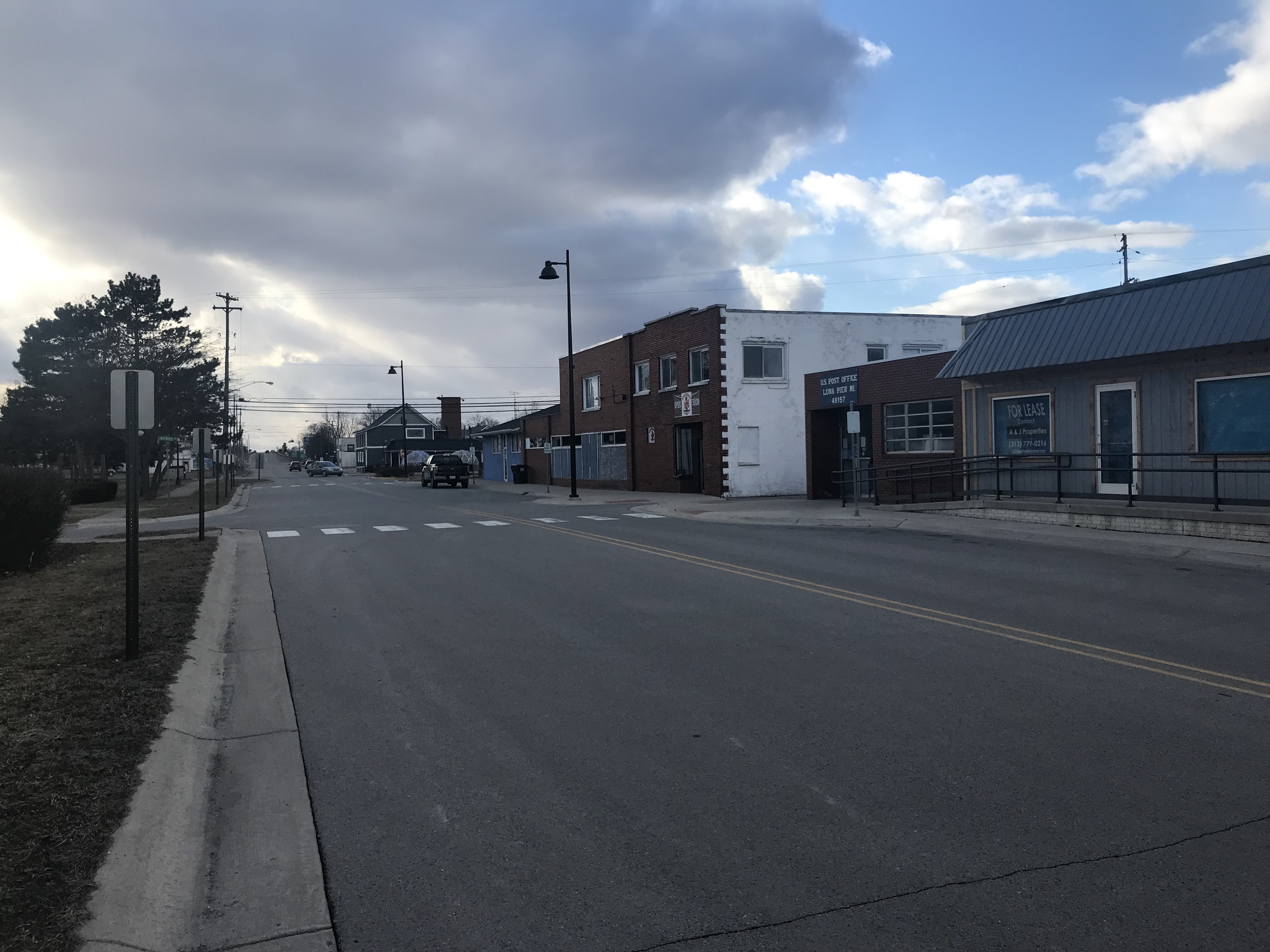
- Facing west along Luna Pier Road

- Seal

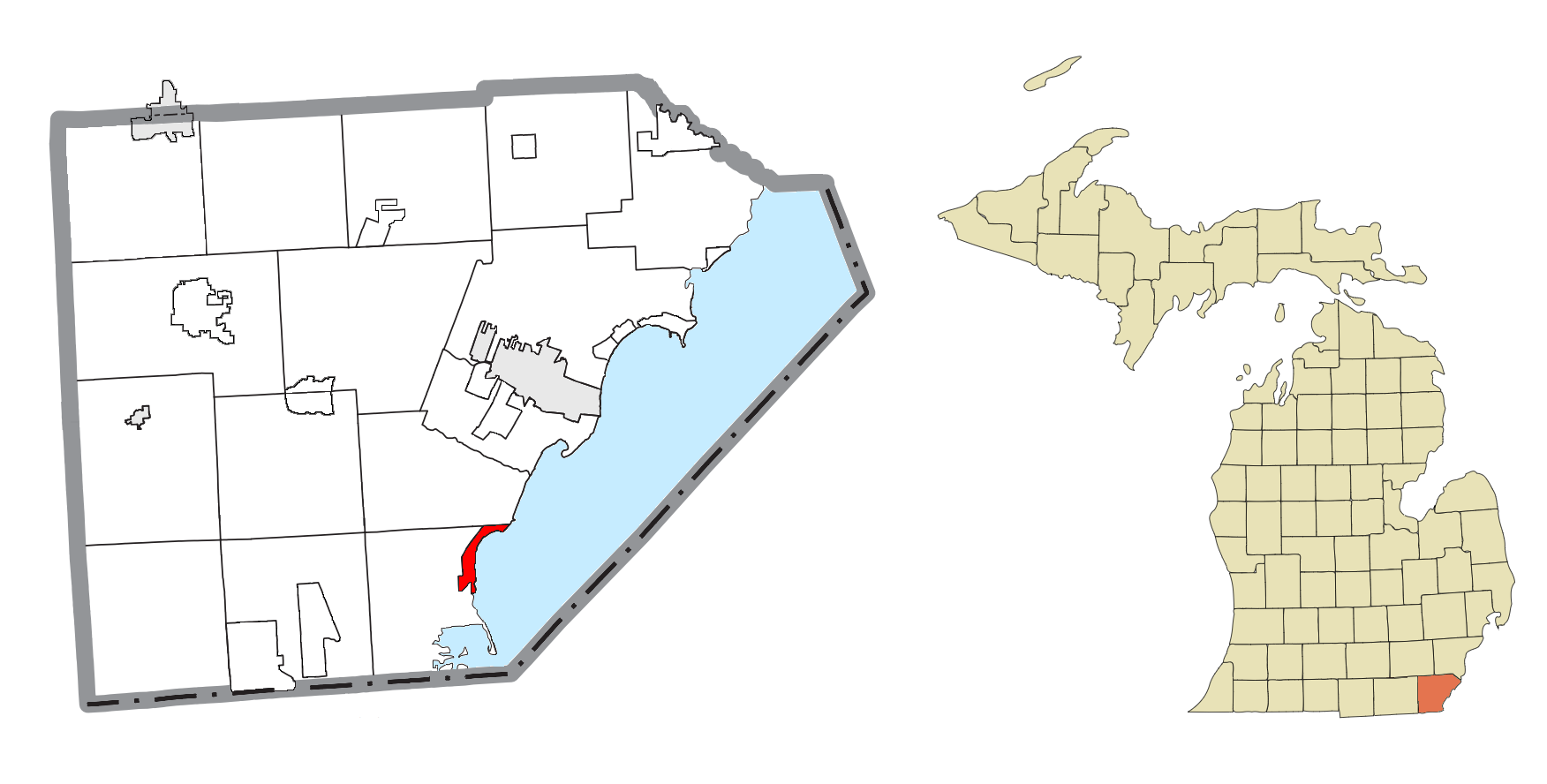
- Location within Monroe County and the state of Michigan

- Location within Michigan Location within the United States
- Coordinates: 41°48′25″N 83°26′33″W
- Country: United States
- State: Michigan
- County: Monroe
- Incorporated: 1963

Government
  - Type: Mayor–council
  - Mayor: James Gardner
  - Clerk: DeAnn Parran

Area
  - Total: 1.69 sq mi (4.37 km^{2})
  - Land: 1.49 sq mi (3.86 km^{2})
  - Water: 0.20 sq mi (0.51 km^{2})
- Elevation: 574 ft (175 m)

Population (2020)
  - Total: 1,382
  - Density: 926.4/sq mi (357.67/km^{2})
- Time zone: UTC-5 (Eastern (EST))
  - Summer (DST): UTC-4 (EDT)
- ZIP Code: 48157 (Luna Pier); 48133 (Erie)
- Area code: 734
- FIPS code: 26-49700
- GNIS feature ID: 0631215
- Website: www.cityoflunapier.com

Luna Pier is a city in Monroe County in the U.S. state of Michigan. The population was 1,382 at the 2020 census. Previously known as Lakewood, it was established in the early 1900s and incorporated as a city in 1963.

Its most prominent feature is a large crescent-shaped pier made of concrete, approximately 800 ft (240 m) long and reaching around 200 feet (61 m) out into Lake Erie. The pier is flanked by sandy beaches and man-made rock and concrete embankments. On most days, the Davis–Besse Nuclear Power Station in Oak Harbor, Ohio, and the Toledo Harbor Light can be seen from the pier. The city is served by Mason Consolidated Schools.

== Geography ==
The city is in southeastern Monroe County, 6 miles (10 km) north of the Ohio state border along the shore of Lake Erie.Interstate 75 forms part of the western border of the city. Detroit is 45 miles (72 km) to the northeast, and Toledo, Ohio, is 12 miles (19 km) to the southwest. Monroe, the county seat, is 8 miles (13 km) to the north.

According to the U.S. Census Bureau, the city of Luna Pier has a total area of 1.69 square miles (4.38 km^{2}), of which 1.49 square miles (3.86 km^{2}) are land and 0.20 square miles (0.52 km^{2}) (11.83%) are water.

== Transportation ==
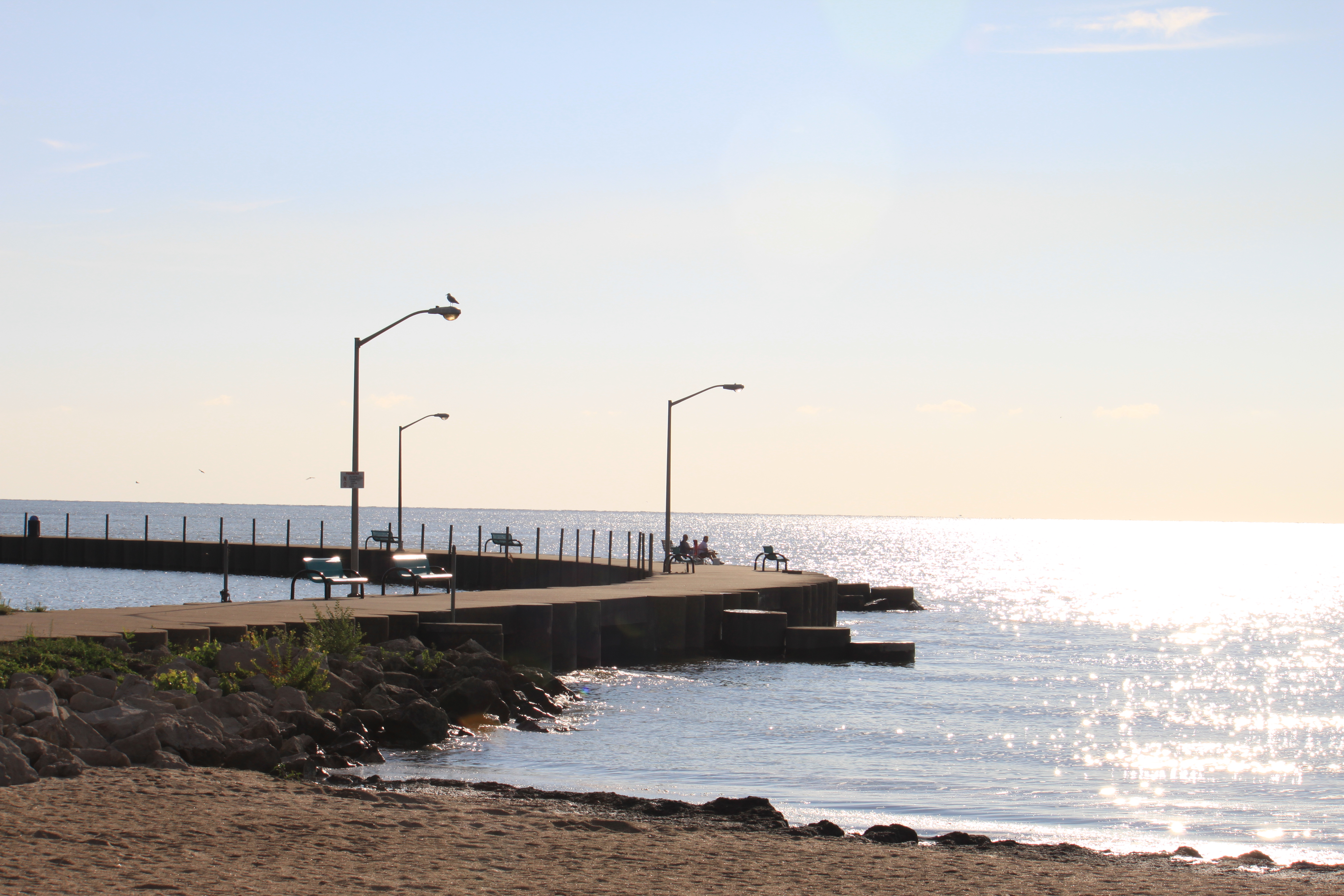
Recreational fishing on Luna Pier

The city of Luna Pier is served by Interstate 75 (I-75), with connections north to Detroit and Flint (via I-275), and connections south to Toledo, Ohio. Access to the city is from Exit 6, Luna Pier Road.

Two roads go in and out of Luna Pier, one being Luna Pier Road, which runs west to US Highway 23 (US 23), US 24, and US 223. The other is Gaynier Road, which leads northwest out of town.

Luna Pier was formerly served by Canadian National Railway via BNSF-contracted coal trains that served the Consumers Energy J.R. Whiting Generating Plant, located on Erie Road south of Luna Pier. Trains to the plant ceased in late April 2016 following its closing. Norfolk Southern Railway also has railroad tracks through the area, but does not serve any industries.

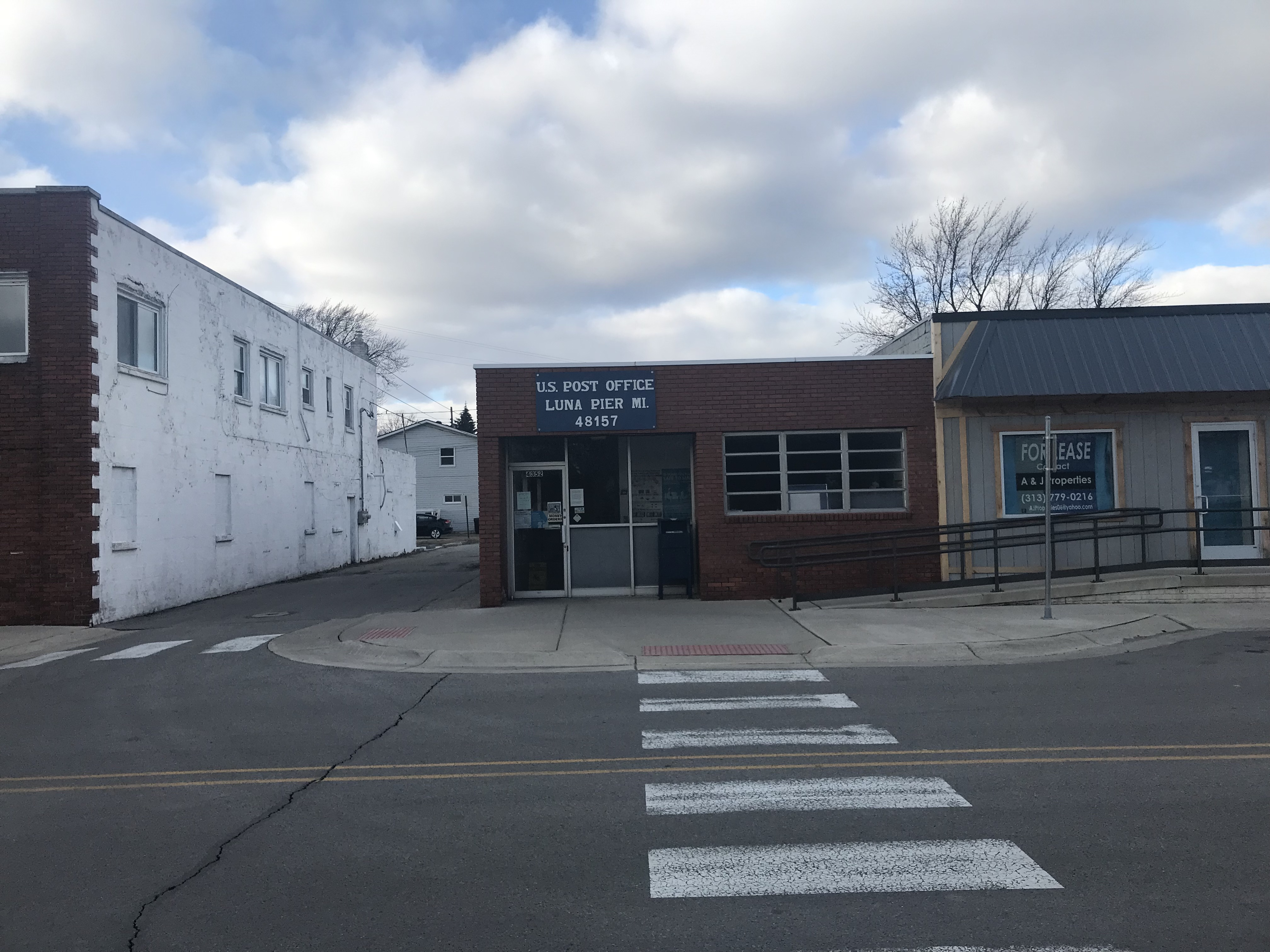
Luna Pier Post Office

== Demographics ==
Historical population
Census	Pop.	Note	%±
1970	1,418		—
1980	1,443		1.8%
1990	1,507		4.4%
2000	1,483		−1.6%
2010	1,436		−3.2%
2020	1,382		−3.8%
U.S. Decennial Census

=== 2010 census ===
As of the census of 2010, there were 1,436 people, 608 households, and 373 families living in the city. The population density was 957.3 inhabitants per square mile (369.6/km^{2}). There were 702 housing units at an average density of 468.0 per square mile (180.7/km^{2}). The racial makeup of the city was 93.2% White, 0.8% African American, 0.8% Native American, 0.5% Asian, 1.1% from other races, and 3.5% from two or more races. Hispanic or Latino residents of any race were 3.0% of the population.

There were 608 households, of which 27.8% had children under the age of 18 living with them, 42.1% were married couples living together, 14.3% had a female householder with no husband present, 4.9% had a male householder with no wife present, and 38.7% were non-families. 32.9% of all households were made up of individuals, and 9.7% had someone living alone who was 65 years of age or older. The average household size was 2.36 and the average family size was 3.00.

The median age in the city was 41.7 years. 22.9% of residents were under the age of 18; 8.6% were between the ages of 18 and 24; 22% were from 25 to 44; 35.8% were from 45 to 64; and 10.5% were 65 years of age or older. The gender makeup of the city was 48.3% male and 51.7% female.

=== 2000 census ===
As of the census of 2000, there were 1,483 people, 592 households, and 406 families living in the city. The population density was 956.9 inhabitants per square mile (369.5/km^{2}). There were 661 housing units at an average density of 426.5 per square mile (164.7/km^{2}). The racial makeup of the city was 95.48% White, 1.01% Native American, 0.94% from other races, 0.20% African American, and 2.36% from two or more races. Hispanic or Latino of any race were 3.03% of the population.

There were 592 households, out of which 35.3% had children under the age of 18 living with them, 50.2% were married couples living together, 10.5% had a female householder with no husband present, and 31.4% were non-families. 28.2% of all households were made up of individuals, and 12.0% had someone living alone who was 65 years of age or older. The average household size was 2.51 and the average family size was 3.05.

In the city, 29.2% of the population was under the age of 18, 6.3% was from 18 to 24, 31.2% from 25 to 44, 24.2% from 45 to 64, and 9.2% was 65 years of age or older. The median age was 36 years. For every 100 females, there were 98.5 males. For every 100 females age 18 and over, there were 98.1 males.

The median income for a household in the city was $40,909, and the median income for a family was $50,000. Males had a median income of $40,850 versus $25,750 for females. The per capita income for the city was $19,325. About 10.9% of families and 14.0% of the population were below the poverty line, including 21.9% of those under age 18 and 11.6% of those age 65 or over.

== Annual events ==
- Freedom Festival (Live Music, Food Trucks, City-Wide Garage Sales & Fireworks), 1st Saturday in July
- Sparkler 5K Run, 1st Sunday in July
- Luna Pier Farmer's Market, May through October, Wednesdays from 3-7pm at First Street Park
- Luna Pier Indoor Farmer's Market, November through March, 2nd and 4th Saturdays from 9am-12pm at Andrew's Place on Luna Pier Road
- Veteran's Day Parade, second Saturday in November
