= M-3 (Michigan highway) =

State highway in Michigan, United States

M-3
- M-3 highlighted in red

Route information
- Maintained by MDOT
- Length: 26.685 mi (42.945 km)
- Existed: 1973–present

Major junctions
- South end: Broadway and Randolph streets in Detroit
- M-53 in Detroit; I-94 in Detroit; M-102 in Eastpointe; I-696 in Roseville; M-59 near Mount Clemens
- North end: I-94 / M-29 near New Baltimore

Location
- Country: United States
- State: Michigan
- Counties: Wayne, Macomb

Highway system
- Michigan State Trunkline Highway System; Interstate; US; State; Byways
← US 2	→ M-4

M-3, known for most of its length as Gratiot Avenue (/ˈɡræʃɪt/, GRASH-it), is a north–south state trunkline highway in the Detroit metropolitan area of the US state of Michigan. The trunkline starts in Downtown Detroit and runs through the city in a northeasterly direction along one of Detroit's five major avenues. The highway passes several historic landmarks and through a historic district. It also connects residential neighborhoods on the city's east side with suburbs in Macomb County and downtown.

Gratiot Avenue in Detroit was one of the original avenues laid out by Judge Augustus Woodward after the Detroit fire in 1805. It was later used as a supply road for Fort Gratiot in Port Huron under authorization from the US Congress in the 1820s. The roadway was included in the State Trunkline Highway System in 1913 and signposted with a number in 1919. Later, it was used as a segment of US Highway 25 (US 25) before that highway was functionally replaced by Interstate 94 (I-94) in the 1960s. The M-3 designation was applied to the current highway in 1973, and a southern section was reassigned to M-85 in 2001.

== Route description ==
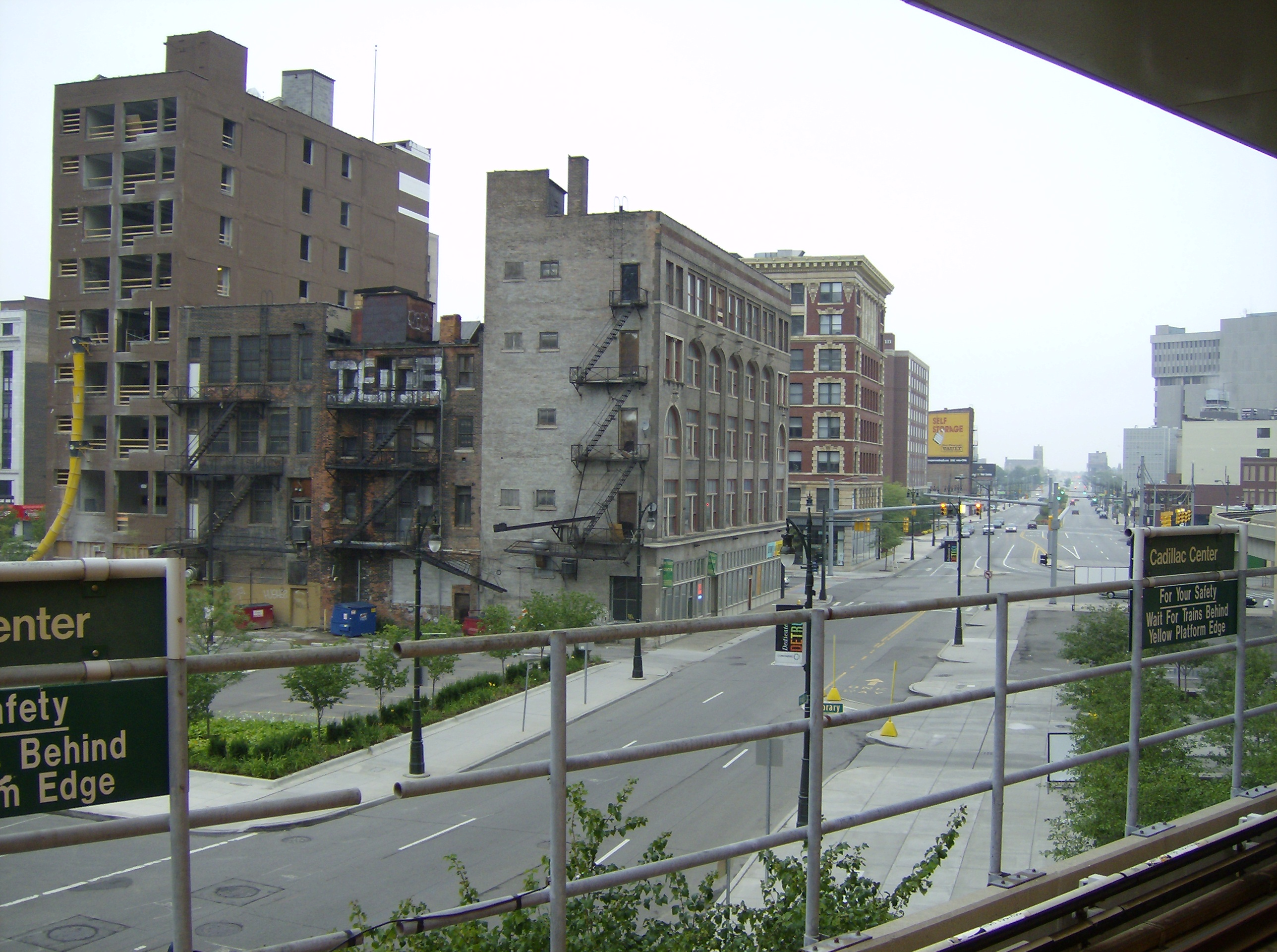
View of Gratiot Avenue from Detroit People Mover station in Detroit

The southern end of M-3 is at an intersection between Broadway and Randolph streets and Gratiot Avenue in downtown Detroit; the highway runs northeasterly from this intersection along Gratiot Avenue, one of Detroit's five major thoroughfares. This street is a boulevard setup with four lanes divided with a median or center turn lane. Gratiot Avenue runs northeasterly through downtown, past Ford Field. Near the stadium, the street passes over I-375 (Chrysler Freeway) without any direct connections. On the east side of the freeway, M-3 runs past the Historic Trinity Lutheran and St. John's-St. Luke's Evangelical churches before intersecting the end of the Fisher Freeway, which at this location is an unnumbered connector to I-75 and I-375. Gratiot continues past the freeway on the city's east side, bordering residential neighborhoods along the way. Through this area, it had a continuous center turn lane, losing the grassy median it had in places downtown. The highway intersects Grand Boulevard near Dueweke Park, and at Van Dyke Avenue, it intersects the southern end of M-53. Gratiot Avenue crosses I-94 at the latter's exit 219 near the Coleman A. Young International Airport and an adjacent industrial area.

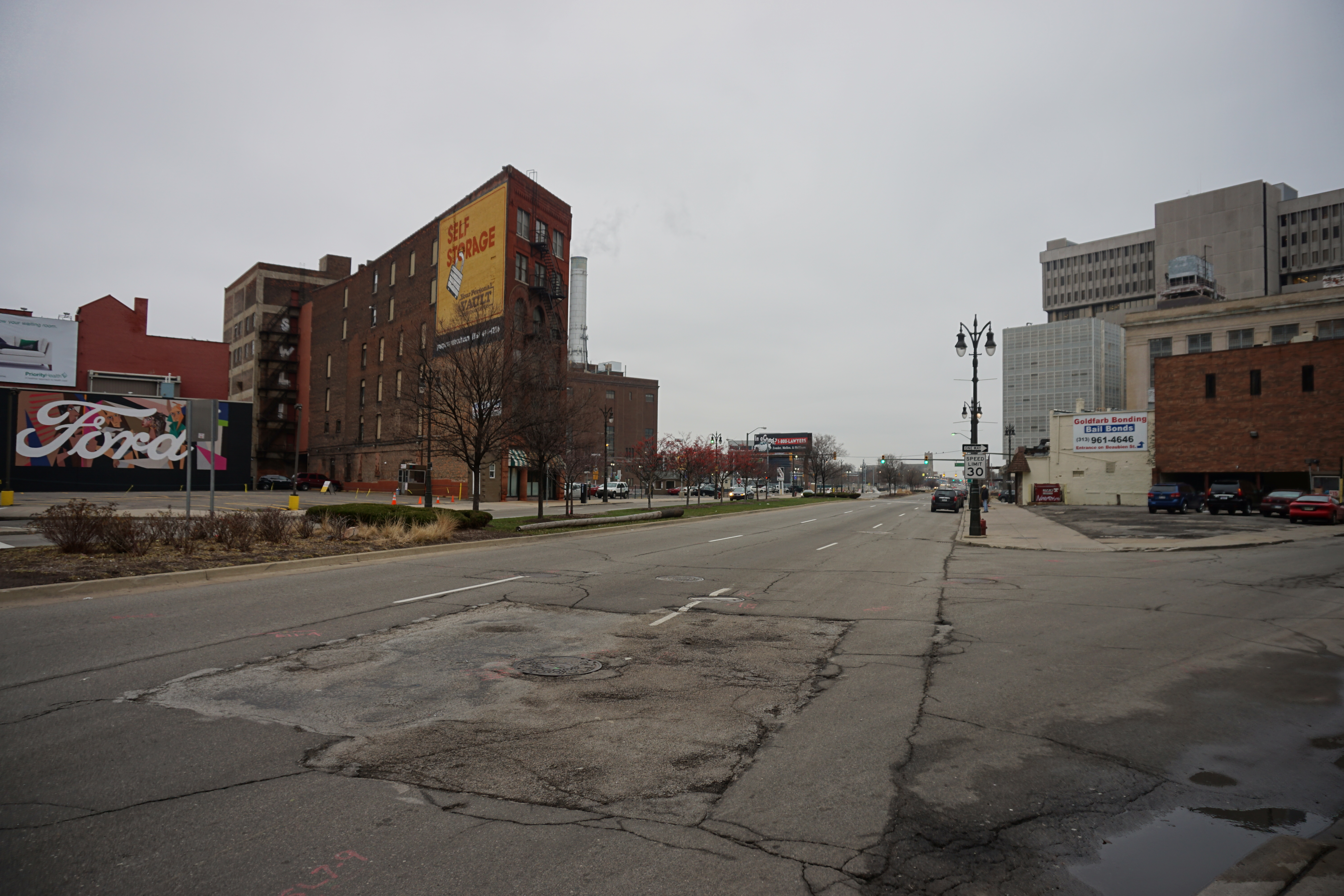
Gratiot Avenue at Brush Street, looking northeast

Past the airport, Gratiot Avenue once again runs through residential neighborhoods while being immediately bordered by commercial properties. The southern end of M-97 is at the intersection between Gratiot and Gunston avenues just northeast of the Outer Drive junction by the airport. The trunkline passes the Assumption of the Blessed Virgin Mary Church near a branch location of the Detroit Public Library at McNichols Street. Just before crossing M-102 (8 Mile Road), Gratiot Avenue widens back to a boulevard. This intersection marks the transition from Detroit and Wayne County to Eastpointe in Macomb County.

In Macomb County, M-3 follows a boulevard setup complete with Michigan lefts at the major intersections in the suburbs of Detroit. There are a series of commercial properties between 10 Mile Road and I-696 (Reuther Freeway) that includes the Eastgate Shopping Center in Roseville. Near 13 Mile Road, there is a partial interchange with I-94 that allows eastbound traffic, which is physically traveling northbound to access northbound M-3 and southbound M-3 traffic to access westbound I-94. The missing connections are possible through the adjacent interchange for Little Mack Avenue on I-94 which also connects to 13 Mile Road and Gratiot Avenue. North of 14 Mile Road, M-3 crosses into Clinton Charter Township next to the Hebrew Memorial Park, a cemetery.

North of the intersection with Metropolitan Parkway, Gratiot Avenue splits into a one-way pairing of Northbound and Southbound Gratiot avenues as it crosses into Mount Clemens near the Clinton River. The two separate streets are one, two, or even three blocks apart through the city's downtown area. North of the Patterson Street intersections, the two streets cross back into Clinton Township and merge back together in four-lane street with a center turn lane. North of M-59 (Hall Road). M-3 clips the southeastern corner of Macomb Township near Selfridge Air National Guard Base. The highway continues into Chesterfield Township. M-3 parts from Gratiot Avenue at the intersection with 23 Mile Road, turning eastward along that roadway to an intersection with I-94. At exit 243, M-3 terminates at this interchange and 23 Mile Road continues easterly as M-29.

M-3 is maintained by the Michigan Department of Transportation (MDOT) like other state highways in Michigan. As a part of these maintenance responsibilities, the department tracks the volume of traffic that uses the roadways under its jurisdiction. These volumes are expressed using a metric called annual average daily traffic, which is a statistical calculation of the average daily number of vehicles on a segment of roadway. MDOT's surveys in 2010 showed that the highest traffic levels along M-3 were the 73,957 vehicles daily south of 14 Mile Road in Roseville; the lowest counts were the 4,609 vehicles per day north of Cadillac Square in downtown Detroit. All of M-3 has been listed on the National Highway System, a network of roads important to the country's economy, defense, and mobility.

== History ==
=== Original designation ===
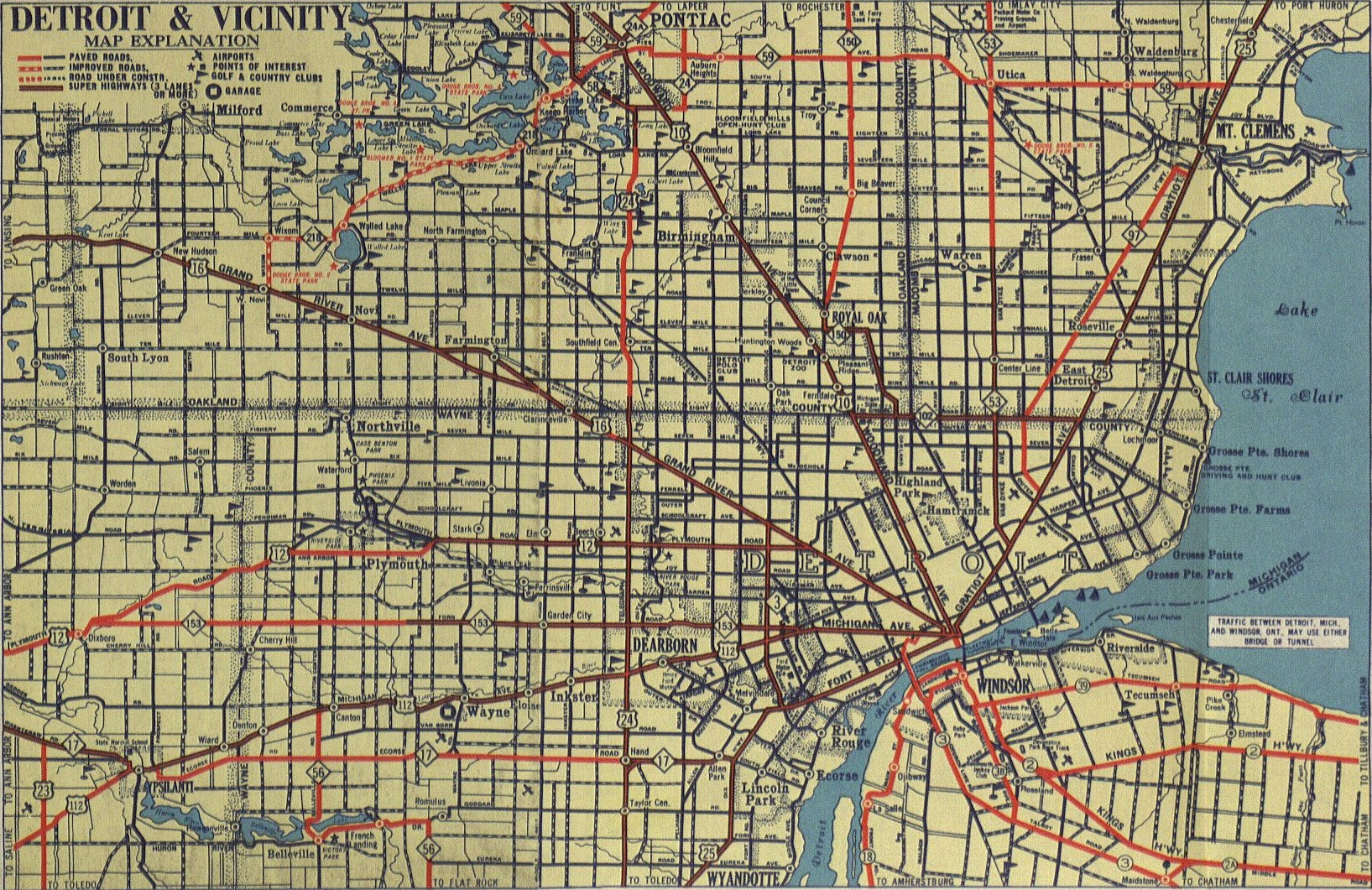
Detroit in April 1939 showing M-3 on Schaefer Highway and US 25 on Gratiot Avenue

The first trunkline to be designated M-3 was Schaefer Highway in 1937, running north–south from US 25 (Dix Avenue) in Melvindale to US 16 (Grand River Avenue) in western Detroit. Two years later, the highway became M-39. Since M-39 was moved to Southfield Road in the end of the 1950s, Schaefer Highway has been a locally maintained road.

=== Current designation ===
The chief transportation routes in 1701 were the Indian trails that crossed the future state of Michigan; the one connecting what are now Detroit and Port Huron was one of these thirteen trails at the time. Detroit created 120-foot (37 m) rights-of-way for the principal streets of the city, the modern Gratiot Avenue included, in 1805. This street plan was devised by Augustus Woodward and others following a devastating fire in Detroit. Gratiot Avenue, then also called Detroit–Port Huron Road, was authorized by the US Congress on March 2, 1827, as a supply road from Detroit to Port Huron for Fort Gratiot. Construction started in Detroit in 1829, and the roadway was completed in the same year to Mount Clemens. The rest was finished in 1833. The road was named for the fort near Port Huron, which was in turn named for Colonel Charles Gratiot, the supervising engineer in charge of construction of the structure in the aftermath of the War of 1812.

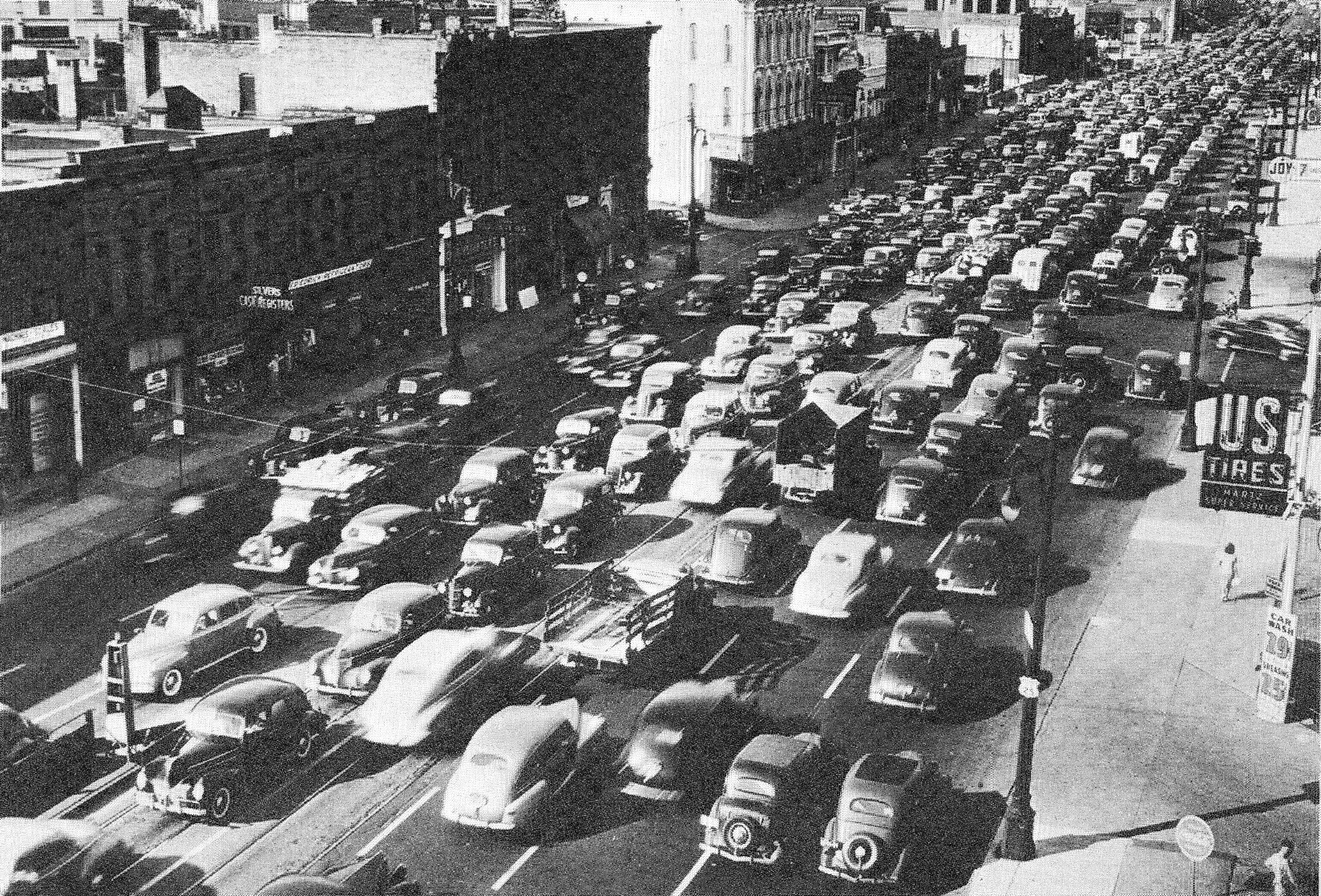
Gratiot Avenue in 1941

On May 13, 1913, the Michigan Legislature passed the State Reward Trunk Line Highway Act, which included Gratiot Avenue as part of Division 1 of the initial highway system. When the Michigan State Highway Department signposted the first state highways in 1919, the trunkline bore the M-19 designation for its entire length from Detroit to Port Huron. In 1926, Gratiot Avenue was redesignated as part of US 25, while the M-19 designation was relocated westward, connecting Yale with US 25 (Gratiot Avenue) just north of 31 Mile Road. In 1963, the portion of US 25 north of 23 Mile Road was turned over to local control as US 25 was routed over the newly constructed I-94 freeway, with the exception of the stretch between New Haven and Muttonville, which was again designated M-19 as an extension of that route. Between Hall and 23 Mile roads, Gratiot Avenue was added to an extended M-59.

Until the 1970s, Gratiot Avenue was part of US 25

M-3 returned to existence in 1973, when US 25, now concurrent with I-94 and I-75 for most of its length through Michigan and Ohio, was truncated at Cincinnati. The former US 25 section of Gratiot Avenue was redesignated M-3, along with a southwestern extension down Fort Street to Clark Avenue (I-75 exit 47A). This also provided an international connection via the Ambassador Bridge to Ontario's Highway 3. The signs were changed over in February 1974 to complete the change. In 1998, the eastern end of M-59 was rerouted to end at I-94 exit 240, eliminating the concurrency from Hall Road to the current northern terminus of M-3.

At the end of 2000, MDOT proposed several highway transfers in Detroit, some of which involved transferring highways in the Campus Martius Park area to city control; another part of the proposal involved MDOT assuming control over a section of Fort Street from the then-northern terminus of M-85 to the then-southern terminus of M-3 at Clark Street. When these transfers were completed the following year, M-3 was severed into two discontinuous segments by the Campus Martius changes, and the southern segment between Clark and Griswold streets was added to an extended M-85.

On April 26, 2023, MDOT and the City of Detroit approved a memorandum of understanding that transferred jurisdiction over the 0.396 miles (0.637 km) of Randolph Street to city control. This MOU also included a payment of $7,609,203.68 to the city to reconstruct that section of street with the stipulation that the city has to complete the project within five years or return the money to the department. The transfer moved Randolph Street from the state trunkline highway system and shifted M-3's southern terminus northward to the intersection of Broadway and Randolph streets with Gratiot Avenue.

== Major intersections ==
County	Location	mi	km	Destinations	Notes
Wayne	Detroit	0.000	0.000	Gratiot Avenue; Randolph Street; Broadway Street	Southern terminus; roadway continues as Gratiot Avenue
Wayne	Detroit	0.901– 0.939	1.450– 1.511	I-375 south (Chrysler Freeway) – Downtown; I-75 – Flint, Toledo	Southbound outbound access and northbound inbound access; exit 51B on I-75
Wayne	Detroit	2.947– 2.967	4.743– 4.775	East Grand Boulevard	
Wayne	Detroit	3.416	5.498	M-53 north (Van Dyke Avenue)	Southern terminus of M-53
Wayne	Detroit	4.382– 4.393	7.052– 7.070	I-94 – Detroit, Port Huron	Exit 219 on I-94
Wayne	Detroit	5.700	9.173	M-97 north (Gunston Avenue)	Southern terminus of M-97
Wayne–Macomb county line	Detroit–Eastpointe city line	8.868	14.272	M-102 (8 Mile Road)	
Macomb	Roseville	12.288– 12.301	19.776– 19.797	I-696 (Reuther Freeway) – Lansing, Port Huron	Exit 27 on I-696
Macomb	Roseville	14.785– 14.874	23.794– 23.937	I-94 west – Detroit	Exit 231 on I-94; access from I-94 to M-3 south via Michigan left
Macomb	Clinton Charter Township	18.003– 18.053	28.973– 29.053	Metropolitan Parkway – Troy	
Macomb	Mount Clemens	22.617– 22.657	36.399– 36.463	M-59 (Hall Road) – Utica, Pontiac	
Macomb	Chesterfield Township	26.655– 26.685	42.897– 42.945	I-94 – Detroit, Port Huron M-29 north (23 Mile Road east) – New Baltimore	Northern terminus; exit 243 on I-94; highway continues as M-29
1.000 mi = 1.609 km; 1.000 km = 0.621 mi: Incomplete access
