= M151 (disambiguation) =

M151 ¼-ton 4×4 utility truck is an American military utility vehicle.

M151 or M-151 may also refer to:

- M-151 (Michigan highway)
- M151 Protector, a variant of the Protector (RWS) remote weapon station
