= U.S. Route 24 in Michigan =

U.S. Highway in Michigan

US Highway 24
- Telegraph Road
- US 24 highlighted in red

Route information
- Maintained by MDOT
- Length: 79.828 mi (128.471 km)
- Existed: November 11, 1926–present

Major junctions
- South end: US 24 near Erie
- I-275 near Carleton; I-94 in Taylor; US 12 in Dearborn; I-96 in Redford; I-696 / M-10 in Southfield
- North end: I-75 near Clarkston

Location
- Country: United States
- State: Michigan
- Counties: Monroe, Wayne, Oakland

Highway system
- United States Numbered Highway System; List; Special; Divided; Michigan State Trunkline Highway System; Interstate; US; State; Byways
← M-23	→ M-24

US Highway 24 (US 24) is a United States Numbered Highway that runs from Minturn, Colorado, to Independence Township, Michigan. In Michigan, it is also known as Telegraph Road and runs for 79.828 miles (128.471 km) as a major north–south state trunkline highway from Bedford Township at the Ohio state line through Metro Detroit. The highway runs through three counties in southeastern Michigan, Monroe, Wayne and Oakland, as it parallels the Lake Erie shoreline and cuts through Metro Detroit on the west. Telegraph Road connects several suburbs together and passes through the western edge of Detroit before terminates northwest of Clarkston at an interchange with Interstate 75 (I-75).

The northern part of the highway follows a section of an old Indian trail called the Saginaw Trail that connected Detroit with points further north. The southern sections in the Downriver area south to Monroe parallel telegraph lines from the mid-19th century. These lines gave the road its name. Later this road was added to the state highway system in the early 20th century. It was upgraded and extended during the 1920s to serve as a western bypass of Detroit. The US 24 designation was applied to the highway on November 11, 1926, when the United States Numbered Highway System was inaugurated. Since that time, an alternate route, Alternate US Highway 24 (Alt. US 24) was designated between the state line and the Gibraltar area; this highway later became part of I-75. In 1970, the northernmost section gained the US 10 designation when that highway was rerouted. That overlap was eliminated in 1986, and US 24 was extended north to Clarkston to replace a segment of US 10. At the same time, a business loop in Pontiac was redesignated for US 24 in addition to its connector routes it has.

== Route description ==
Like other state highways in Michigan, US 24 is maintained by the Michigan Department of Transportation (MDOT). In 2011, the department's traffic surveys showed that on average, 85,302 vehicles used the highway daily between the "Mixing Bowl" and 12 Mile Road and 6,401 vehicles did so each day in southern Monroe County, the highest and lowest counts along the highway, respectively. All of US 24 north of I-275 is listed on the National Highway System, a network of roads important to the country's economy, defense, and mobility.

=== Monroe County and Downriver ===
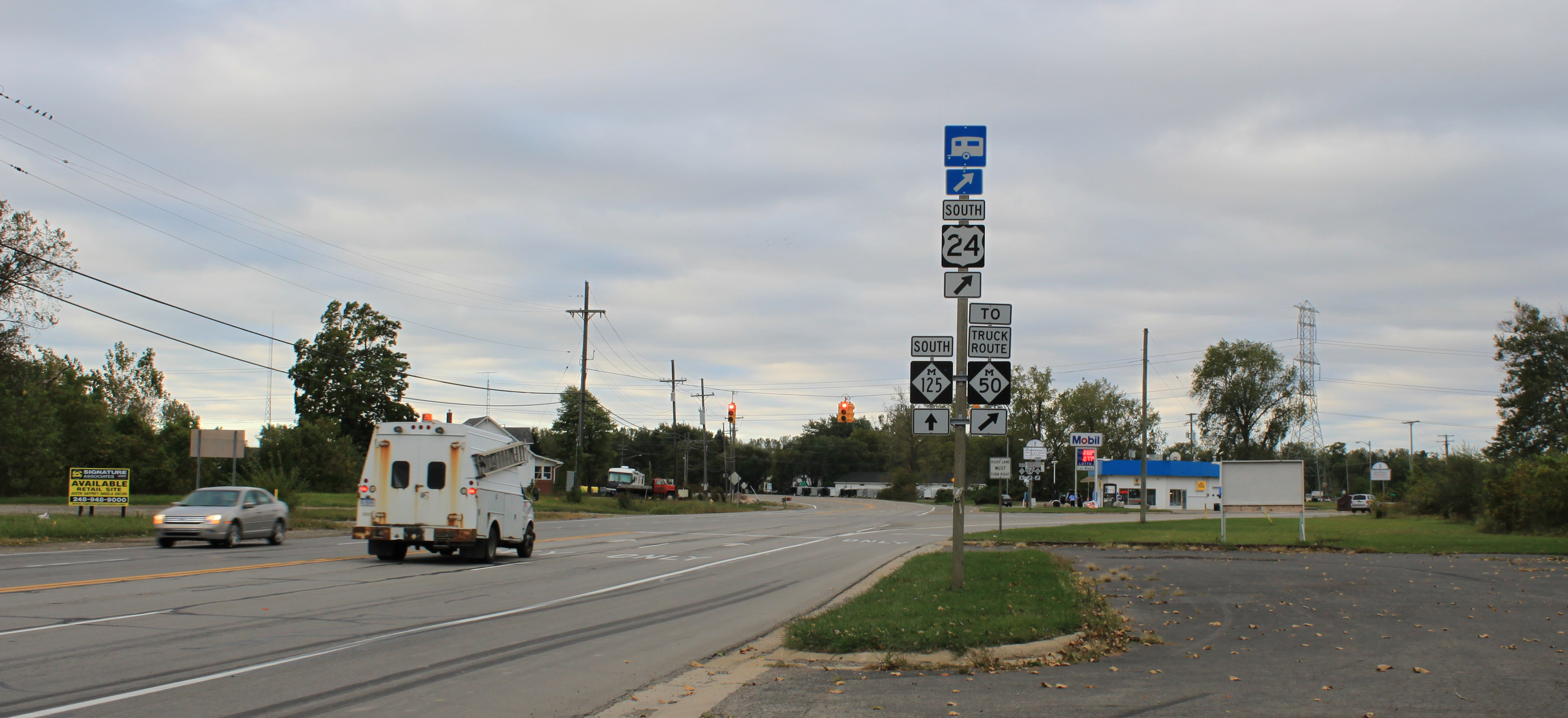
Intersection of US 24 and M-125 looking south

US 24 crosses the Ohio state line and follows Telegraph Road northeasterly through Monroe County. The highway runs parallel to the Lake Erie shoreline, farther inland than both I-75 (Detroit–Toledo Freeway) or M-125 (Dixie Highway). The area around the trunkline is a mixture of farm fields and clusters of houses. Luna Pier Road connects US 24 to M-125 near Erie; this roadway is an unsigned highway designated Connector 125 that runs as a connector route between the two highways. Further north, US 24 passes to the west side of Monroe, meeting the eastern terminus of M-50 (Custer Road) near Custer Airport. The trunkline crosses the River Raisin near this intersection as well. North of Monroe near Stoney Creek, M-125 merges into US 24 and terminates. Further north, US 24 crosses I-275 before passing near the Flat Rock Speedway. The highway then crosses the Huron River and into Wayne County, entering the Downriver area.

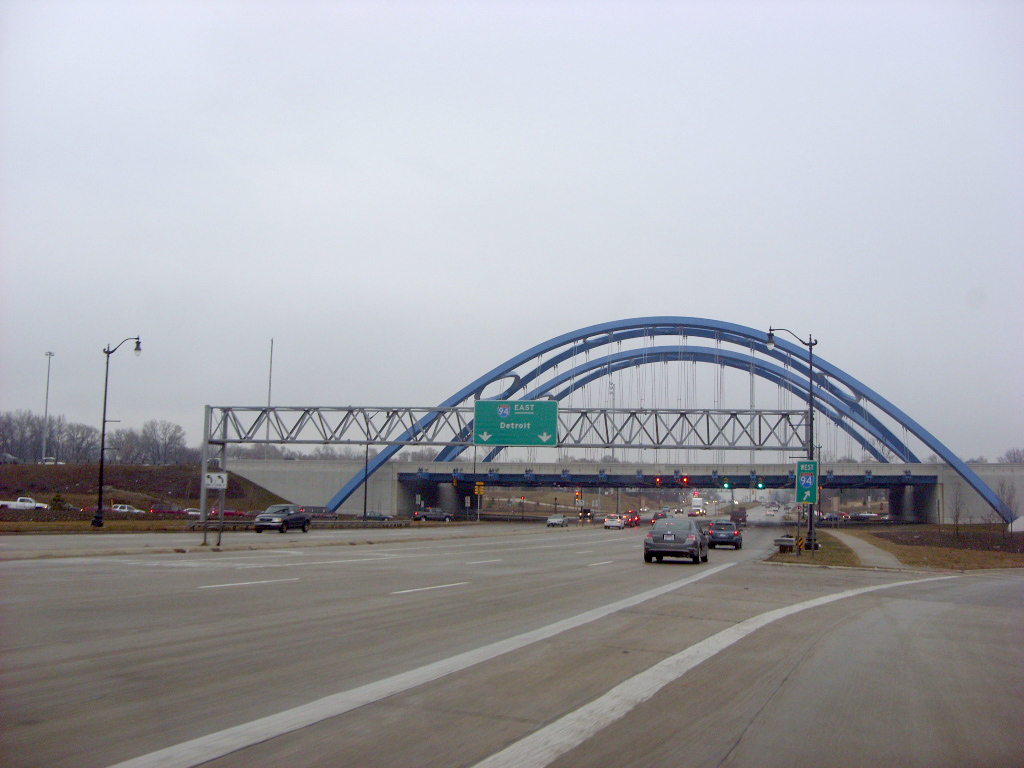
I-94 Gateway Bridge over US 24

Telegraph Road runs through downtown Flat Rock as it parallels the Lake Erie shoreline. North of the city in Brownstown Township, Telegraph Road and US 24 turn due north; Connector 24 runs along Dix–Toledo Highway to connect US 24 to I-75 near Woodhaven. There is another unsigned highway, Connector 240, in Taylor that provides access from southbound US 24 to southbound I-75 and from northbound I-75 to northbound US 24 between a pair of interchanges near the Southland Center. Telegraph continues northward through Taylor, widening into a boulevard and gaining a median. Traffic turning left onto the road needs to perform a Michigan left maneuver to do so, and drivers changing directions along US 24 have to use the U-turn crossovers in the median. From here north, the road runs through residential areas of the suburb approximately three miles (4.8 km) east of Detroit Metropolitan Airport, lined with various businesses immediately adjacent to the roadway. It crosses the South Branch of the Ecorse River. There are a pair of interchanges on US 24 for Ecorse Road and I-94 (Detroit Industrial Freeway), the latter being of the single point urban interchange (SPUI) design.

=== Western suburbs ===
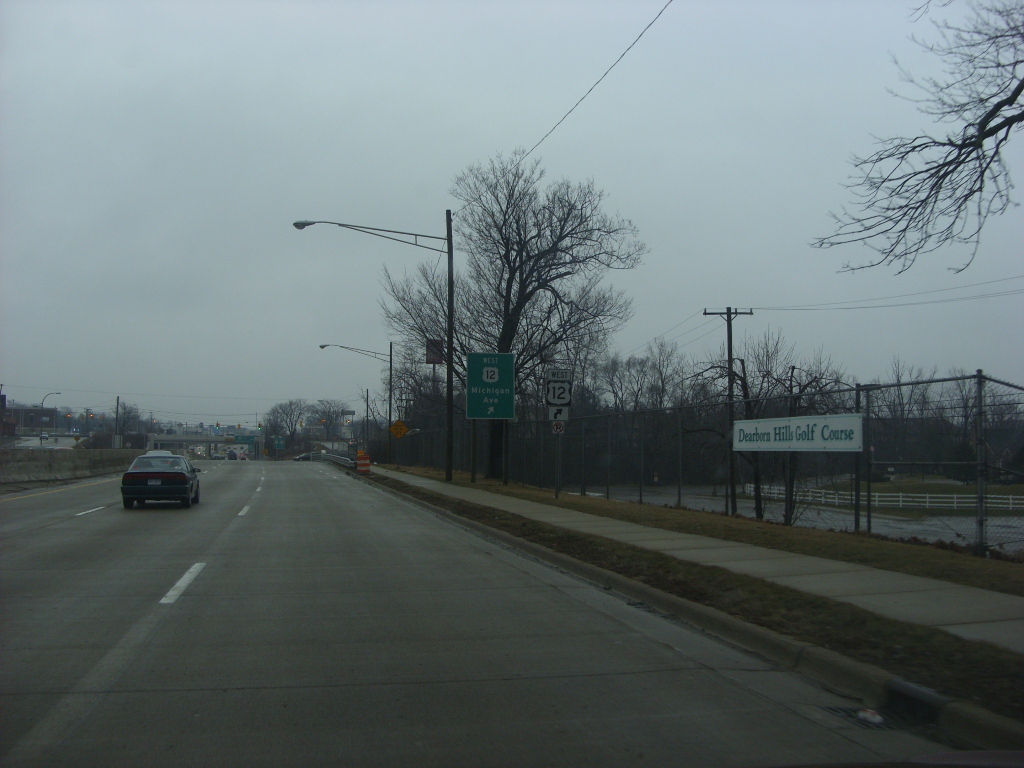
Near the Michigan Avenue intersection in Dearborn

North of the Van Born Road intersection, Telegraph crosses into Dearborn Heights for the first time and over the North Branch of the Ecorse River. Past the river, the highway enters Dearborn. In the middle of its course through that city, US 24 crosses US 12 (Michigan Avenue) south of a branch of the River Rouge and the Dearborn Hills Golf Course. Telegraph crosses back into Dearborn Heights at the intersection with M-153 (Ford Road) west of St. Hedwig Cemetery. North of the cemetery, in the a section of the Middle River Rouge Park, Telegraph crosses the middle branch of that river before entering the southeastern corner of Redford Township. There is an interchange for a boulevard section of Plymouth Road before US 24 meets I-96 (Jeffries Freeway) on a section of the border with Detroit.

To the northeast of the I-96 interchange is the Elisa Howell Park as US 24 continues due north along a segment of the Detroit–Redford Township boundary. The trunkline crosses into Detroit completely north of Puritan Street. Telegraph passes through urban residential neighborhoods on the city's far west side flanked by various municipal parkland along the River Rouge to its immediate east. US 24 eventually intersects with M-5 (Grand River Avenue), one of the five principal avenues of the Detroit street plan, south of 7 Mile Road. When it crosses M-102 (8 Mile Road), US 24 leaves Wayne County and Detroit and enters Oakland County at the city of Southfield.

=== Northern suburbs ===
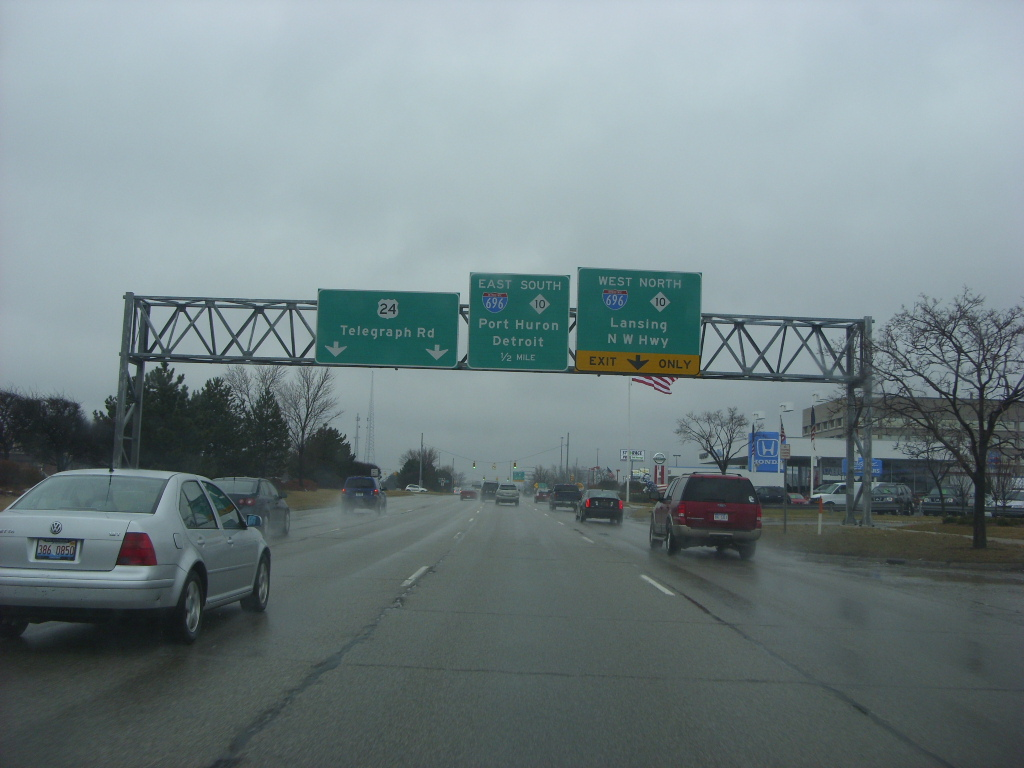
Telegraph Road approaching the Mixing Bowl

Running through Southfield, Telegraph Road continues due north to a location between 9 and 10 Mile roads. There the highway curves to the northwest and back north to approach the "Mixing Bowl", a complex interchange near 11 Mile Road that includes connections to I-696 (Reuther Freeway) and M-10 (Lodge Freeway and Northwestern Highway). Between the Mixing Bowl and 12 Mile Road, Telegraph runs through a commercial district in Southfield, and north of 13 Mile Road, the highway forms part of the border between the villages of Franklin and Bingham Farms; this area is predominantly suburban residential subdivisions.

At 14 Mile Road, US 24 crosses into Bloomfield Township and begins to meander between the lakes of Oakland County's lake country. The highway turns to the northwest before crossing Square Lake Road (19 Mile) south of Pontiac. Square Lake Road forms part of Business US 24 (Bus. US 24), a business loop that runs into downtown Pontiac; Telegraph Road bypasses downtown to the southwest and west. At the interchange with Orchard Lake Road on the border between Pontiac and Sylvan Lake, US 24 turns northward along Pontiac's western border as an undivided roadway. Telegraph intersects M-59 (Huron Road) on the border between Waterford Township and Pontiac.

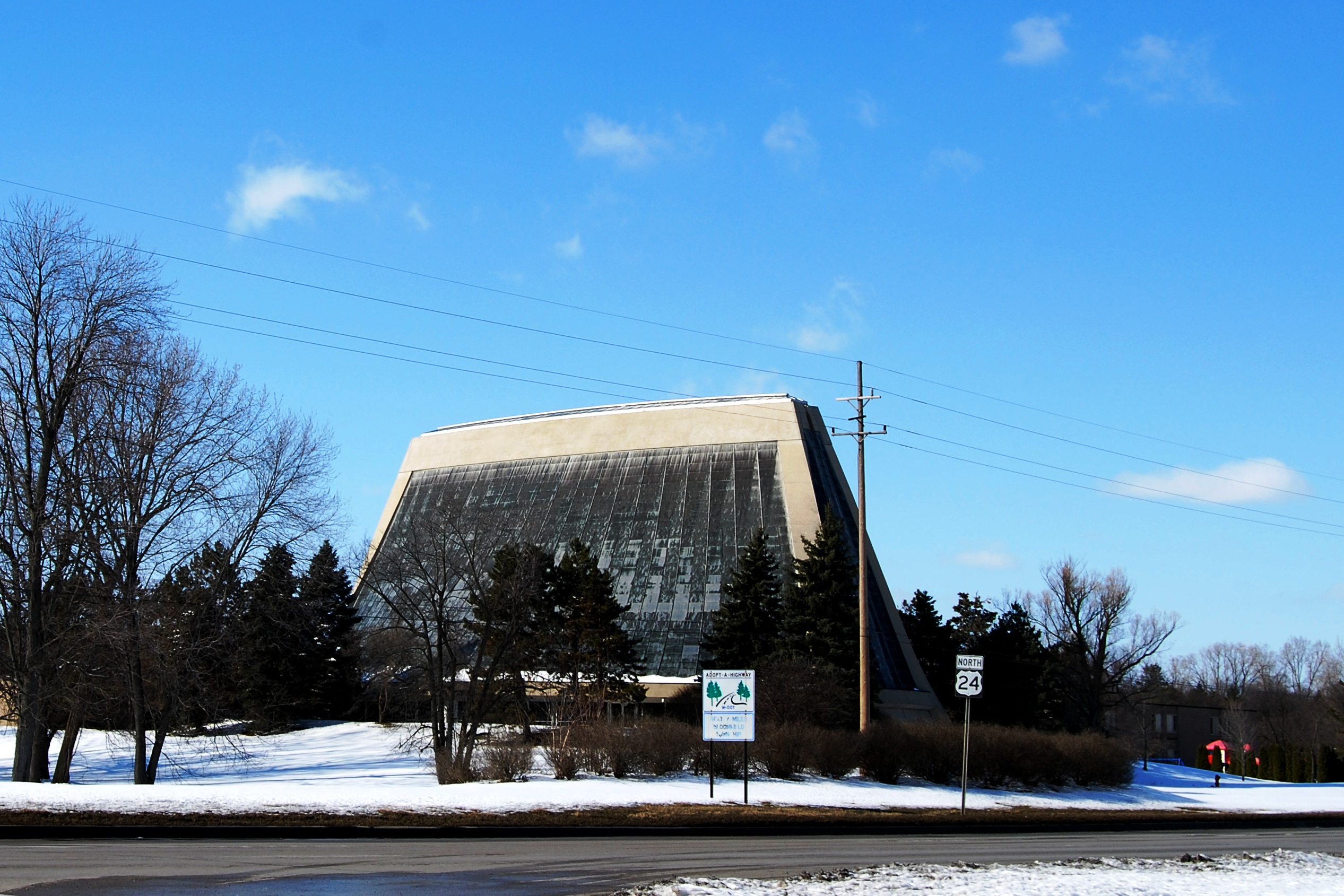
Temple Beth El at US 24 and 14 Mile Road

North of the Summit Place Mall, Telegraph Road ends at the intersection with Dixie Highway and the northern end of Bus. US 24 (Cesar Chavez Avenue). US 24 turns northwesterly along Dixie Highway, crossing into Waterford Township. The highway meanders again through lake country flanked by residential subdivisions of the township. South of Clarkston, US 24 intersects the southern end of M-15. US 24 bypasses the city to the west and terminates at an interchange with I-75.

== History ==
In 1701, the first transportation routes through what became the state of Michigan were the lakes, rivers and Indian trails. One of these Indian trails, the Saginaw Trail followed a path from the Detroit area north to Saginaw; this trail ran along what is now Dixie Highway from Pontiac northwards.

Telegraph lines were first installed from the Detroit area south to the Monroe area in the mid-19th century with additional lines north to Pontiac completed around 1868. As these communication lines were installed, roadways were added as needed to provide access for maintenance. The parallel road from Dearborn south was named for these lines, becoming Telegraph Road. When the state initially signposted its state highways in 1919, Telegraph Road from the Ohio state line north to Dearborn was assigned the original M-10 designation. The same year, the Dixie Highway, an auto trail that ran south from Detroit to Miami, Florida, was extended through Pontiac northward to the Straits of Mackinac. The numerical highway designation was changed to US 24 when the United States Numbered Highway System was inaugurated on November 11, 1926.

Highway traffic coming north from Toledo was forced to pass through Detroit to get to points north at the time. To ease the congestion downtown, a westerly bypass was constructed in the 1920s. Between Flat Rock and Dearborn, the upgraded highway was opened in 1922, with an extension to Stoney Creek the following year. The new road was built north from Michigan Avenue to Grand River Avenue in 1924. The extension to the state line was finished in 1925, and the remainder to Dixie Highway north of Pontiac was done in 1930. At the time, US 24 was extended north to the corner of Telegraph and Square Lake roads, with M-58 routed along the western Pontiac bypass. The highway was widened into a multi-lane highway starting in 1936.

By 1945, a divided highway designated Alternate US 24 (Alt. US 24) was opened from the state line north to Erie. This divided highway, now named the Detroit–Toledo Expressway, was extended in 1956 to Gibraltar, and the Alt. US 24 designation was continued north to connect back to the mainline near Woodhaven. The former connection near Erie became a connector route, now part of Connector 125 and Connector 75. Additional segments of freeway were opened through 1958, and the I-75 designation was applied to the freeway the following year, becoming the first segment of Interstate Highway so signed in Michigan.

Between 1960 and 1963, the four-lane undivided highway was turned into a seven- and eight-lane divided highway in Wayne County. At this time, the Michigan State Highway Department, predecessor to MDOT, added median crossovers along Telegraph Road. These additions were used to eliminate left turns at intersections and shift traffic less than 350 feet (110 m) away from the intersection. The distance complicated traffic flow. Later this concept was refined and used at the intersection of 8 Mile Road and Livernois Avenue, becoming the first Michigan left intersection in the state.

In 1970, US 10 was moved from its routing along Woodward Avenue between Detroit and Pontiac to follow the Lodge Freeway. From the northern end of the Lodge to Square Lake Road near Pontiac, US 10 and US 24 were run concurrently along Telegraph Road. North of Square Lake Road, US 10 continued along Telegraph back to Dixie Highway as before. In 1986, US 10 was truncated to end at Bay City instead of continuing on to Detroit. In the process, Telegraph Road lost its US 10 co-designation, US 24 was extended to its current northern terminus near Clarkston and the existing Bus. US 10 in Pontiac was redesignated to become a Bus. US 24 instead.

The interchange with I-94 had only two bridges and left hand exits were used throughout. This interchange was reconfigured in 2005 to a SPUI design that was completed in December of that year. A pair of bridges called the Gateway Bridge (alternately "Gateway to Detroit") was incorporated in the new interchange.

On November 30, 2005, President George W. Bush signed the 2006 appropriations bill related to the US Department of Transportation and other agencies. Contained in that law was a provision that named a 30-mile (48 km) stretch of US 24 from I-96 to its northern end at I-75 the "Max M. Fisher Memorial Highway" in memory of Max Fisher, a longtime Detroit-area philanthropist; the highway was dedicated in May 2008. In June 2012, Governor Rick Snyder signed a bill from the Michigan Legislature that designated a section of Telegraph Road in Taylor for Cpl. Matthew Edwards, a member of the Taylor Police Department who was killed in the line of duty.

== Major intersections ==
County	Location	mi	km	Destinations	Notes
Monroe	Bedford Township	0.000	0.000	US 24 west (Telegraph Road) – Toledo	Continuation into Ohio
Monroe	Erie Township	6.108	9.830	Luna Pier Road to M-125 / I-75	Western terminus of unsigned Connector 125; former M-151
Monroe	Monroe	14.916	24.005	M-50 west – Jackson	Eastern terminus of M-50
Monroe	Monroe	15.240	24.526	Elm Avenue	Grade separation; access via Custer Drive
Monroe	Frenchtown Township	19.794	31.855	M-125 south (Monroe Street) – Monroe	Northern terminus of M-125
Monroe	Ash Township	22.671– 22.701	36.485– 36.534	I-275 – Flint, Toledo	Exit 2 on I-275
Wayne	Brownstown Township	32.293	51.971	Dix–Toledo Highway to I-75 north (Detroit–Toledo Freeway)	Unsigned Connector 24
Wayne	Taylor	35.827	57.658	To I-75 (Detroit–Toledo Freeway)	Southbound exit and northbound entrance; unsigned Connector 240
Wayne	Taylor	40.057	64.465	Ecorse Road	Interchange
Wayne	Taylor	40.688– 40.713	65.481– 65.521	I-94 – Chicago, Detroit	Exit 202 on I-94
Wayne	Dearborn	43.109– 43.126	69.377– 69.405	US 12 (Michigan Avenue)	Cloverleaf interchange
Wayne	Dearborn Heights	45.000	72.420	M-153 (Ford Road)	
Wayne	Redford Township	40.026– 49.040	64.416– 78.922	I-96 (Jeffries Freeway) – Lansing, Detroit	Exit 179 on I-96
Wayne	Detroit	51.716– 51.740	83.229– 83.267	M-5 (Grand River Avenue)	
Wayne–Oakland county line	Detroit– Southfield city line	53.002– 53.021	85.298– 85.329	M-102 (8 Mile Road)	8 Mile Road forms the county and city lines; diverging diamond interchange
Oakland	Southfield	56.207– 56.436	90.456– 90.825	I-696 (Walter P. Reuther Freeway) – Port Huron, Lansing; M-10 (Northwestern Highway/Lodge Freeway) – Detroit	Interchange is known as the "Mixing Bowl"; exits 8 and 10 on I-696; exit 18 on M-10
Oakland	Bloomfield Township	64.332	103.532	Bus. US 24 north (Square Lake Road)	Former northern terminus of US 24
Oakland	Pontiac	66.002– 66.567	106.220– 107.129	Orchard Lake Road	Grade separation; access via Old Telegraph Road northbound
Oakland	Pontiac	67.470	108.582	M-59 (West Huron Street)	
Oakland	Waterford Township	71.211	114.603	Bus. US 24 south (Dixie Highway)	Former northern terminus of Telegraph Road, which has since been extended to Walton Boulevard
Oakland	Independence Township	77.343	124.471	M-15 north (Ortonville Road)	Southern terminus of M-15
Oakland	Springfield Township	79.828	128.471	I-75 – Detroit, Flint	Exit 93 on I-75; roadway continues north as Dixie Highway
1.000 mi = 1.609 km; 1.000 km = 0.621 mi: Incomplete access

== Related trunklines ==
There is one business loop in Pontiac, and there used to be an alternate route signed for US 24 between the state line and the Gibraltar area. This route was incorporated into I-75 in 1959.

=== Business route ===
Business US Highway 24
- Location: Pontiac, Michigan
- Length: 7.121 mi (11.460 km)
- Existed: 1986–present

Business US Highway 24 (Bus. US 24) is a business loop running through downtown Pontiac. The highway starts at an intersection between US 24 (Telegraph Road) and Square Lake Road in Bloomfield Township southwest of downtown Pontiac. From there, the business loop follows Square Lake Road eastward to an intersection with M-1 (Woodward Avenue) and Business Loop Interstate 75 (BL I-75). The two business loops merge and run concurrently northward on Woodward Avenue into Pontiac. On the southern edge of downtown, Woodward Avenue splits to form a one-way loop round the central business district. Northbound BL I-75/Bus. US 24 follows the eastern side of the loop and intersects a pair of one-way streets that carry M-59 through the city. At the northern intersection, westbound M-59 merges onto Woodward Avenue Loop. Northbound BL I-75 splits from the concurrency at the intersection with Perry Street; the southbound direction of BL I-75 merges onto the loop at this intersection. Northbound Bus. US 24 splits from the loop at Cesar Chavez Avenue. From there, the business loop continues through the northern end of Pontiac, rejoining the southbound traffic at an intersection with Oakland Avenue at the northern edge of town. Bus. US 24 follows Dixie Highway once it crosses into Waterford Township. The northern end of the business loop as an intersection with US 24 where the parent highway transitions from Telegraph Road to Dixie Highway in Waterford Township.

In 1985, the Michigan Department of Transportation received permission from the American Association of State Highway and Transportation Officials to truncate US 10 to Bay City, and when the change was made the following year, US 24 replaced US 10 on Telegraph Road north of Square Lake Road, and Bus. US 10 through downtown was redesignated Bus. US 24.

Major intersections
The entire highway is in Oakland County.

Location	mi	km	Destinations	Notes
Bloomfield Township	0.000	0.000	US 24 (Telegraph Road)	
Bloomfield Township	1.288– 1.309	2.073– 2.107	BL I-75 south (Square Lake Road east) M-1 south (Woodward Avenue) – Detroit	Southern end of BL I-75 concurrency; northern terminus of M-1
Pontiac	3.459	5.567	Southern end of one-way Woodward Avenue Loop	
Pontiac	4.138	6.659	M-59 east (Huron Street)	Eastbound direction of M-59
Pontiac	4.218	6.788	M-59 west (University Drive)	Southern end of M-59 westbound concurrency around Woodward Avenue Loop
Pontiac	4.409	7.096	BL I-75 north (Perry Street)	Northern end of BL I-75 northbound concurrency; eastern end of BL I-75 southbound concurrency
Pontiac	4.731	7.614	BL I-75 south / M-59 west (Woodward Avenue Loop)	Western end of BL I-75 southbound concurrency; northern end of M-59 concurrency; Bus. US 24 exits the Woodward Avenue Loop
Waterford Township	7.121	11.460	US 24 (Dixie Highway, Telegraph Road)	Roadway continues as US 24 on Dixie Highway
1.000 mi = 1.609 km; 1.000 km = 0.621 mi: Concurrency terminus

== See also ==
- "Telegraph Road", the Dire Straits song inspired by a bus trip musician Mark Knopfler took down Telegraph Road.

US Highway 24
Previous state: Ohio	Michigan	Next state: Terminus
