= Howell Township, Michigan =

- Civil township
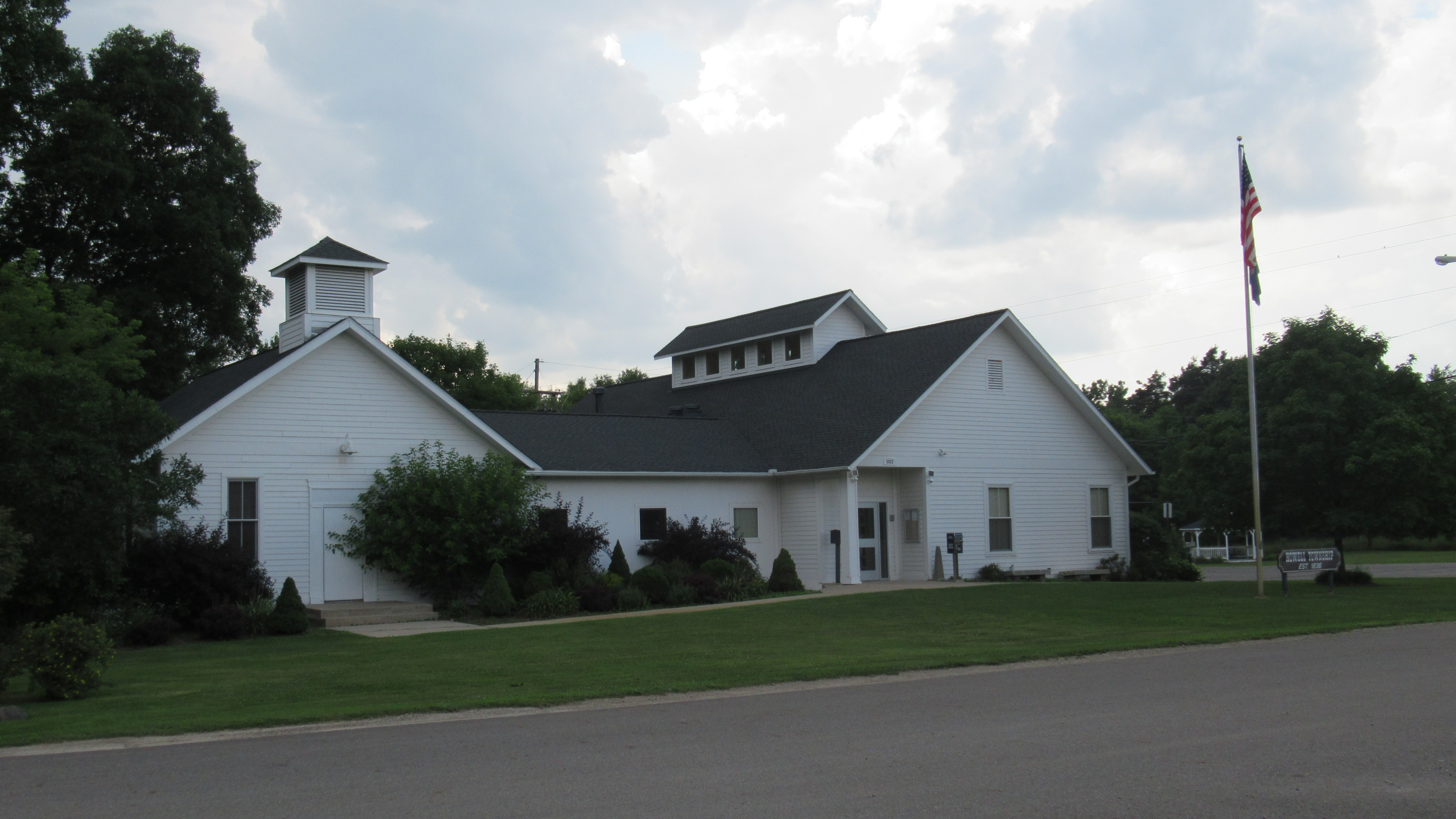
- Howell Township Hall

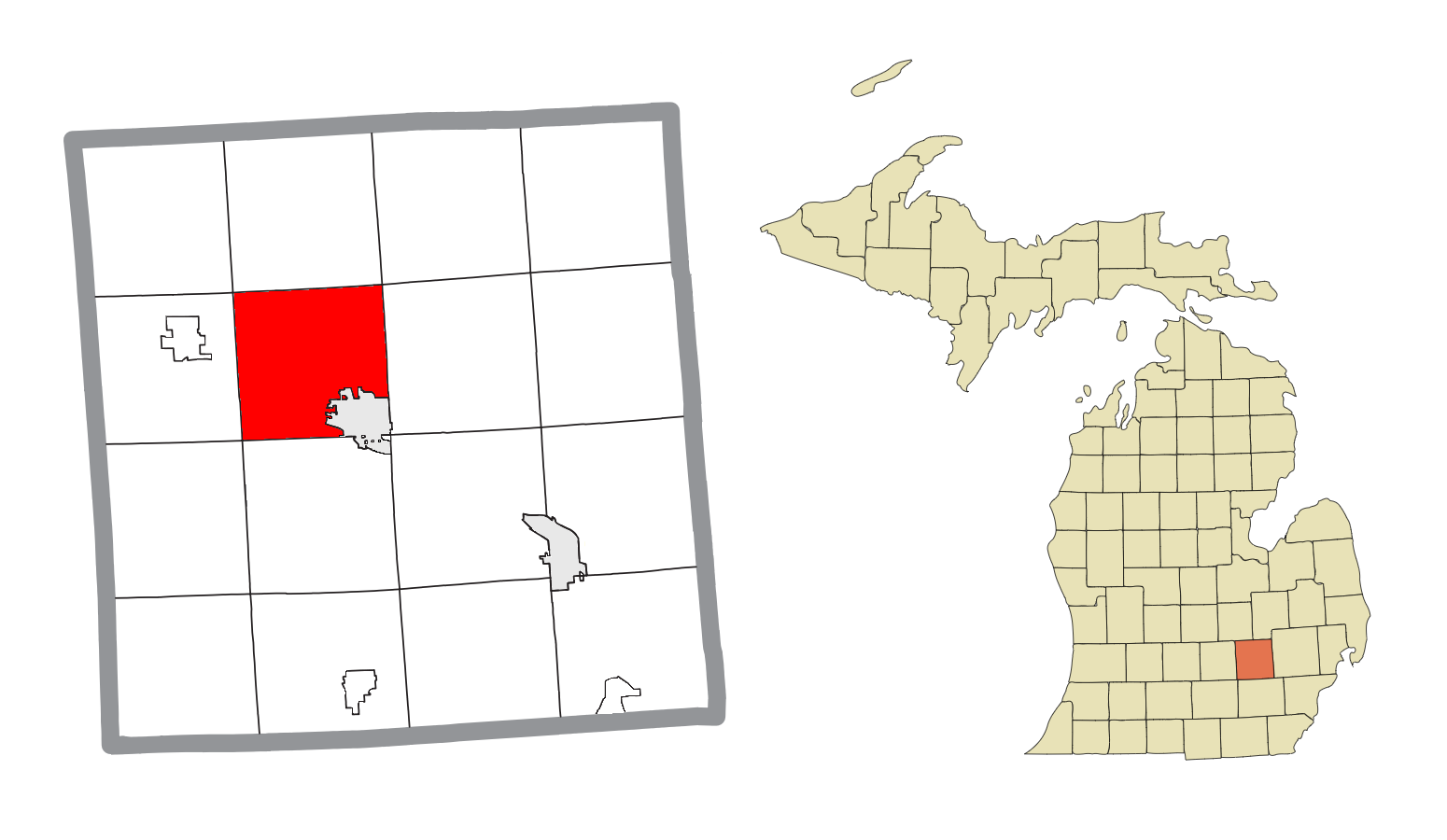
- Location within Livingston County

- Location in Michigan Location in the United States
- Coordinates: 42°37′55″N 83°58′10″W
- Country: United States
- State: Michigan
- County: Livingston
- Established: 1836

Government
  - Supervisor: Mike Coddington
  - Clerk: Jean Graham

Area
  - Total: 32.0 sq mi (82.9 km^{2})
  - Land: 31.8 sq mi (82.4 km^{2})
  - Water: 0.23 sq mi (0.6 km^{2})
- Elevation: 906 ft (276 m)

Population (2020)
  - Total: 7,893
  - Density: 248/sq mi (95.8/km^{2})
- Time zone: UTC-5 (Eastern (EST))
  - Summer (DST): UTC-4 (EDT)
- ZIP code(s): 48836 (Fowlerville); 48843, 48844, 48855 (Howell)
- Area code: 517
- FIPS code: 26-39560
- GNIS feature ID: 1626496
- Website: howelltownshipmi.org

Howell Township is a civil township of Livingston County in the U.S. state of Michigan. The population was 7,893 at the 2020 census, up from 6,702 at the 2010 census. The township is bordered on the southeast by the city of Howell, but the two are administered autonomously.

== Communities ==
- Fleming is an unincorporated community at Fleming and Warner roads and Grand River Avenue (42°38′37″N 84°00′48″W).

== Geography ==
Howell Township is in central Livingston County, on the north and west sides of the city of Howell, the county seat. Interstate 96 passes through the southern part of the township, with access from Exit 133 (Highway M-59). I-96 leads west 33 miles (53 km) to Lansing and southeast 57 miles (92 km) to Detroit, while M-59 leads east 37 miles (60 km) to Pontiac.

According to the United States Census Bureau, the township has a total area of 32.0 square miles (82.9 km^{2}), of which 31.8 square miles (82.4 km^{2}) are land and 0.2 square miles (0.6 km^{2}), or 0.70%, are water. The eastern part of the township is within the Shiawassee River watershed, draining north to Saginaw Bay, while the western part drains to the Red Cedar River, flowing west to the Grand River and Lake Michigan.

== Demographics ==
As of the census of 2000, there were 5,679 people, 1,902 households, and 1,565 families residing in the township. The population density was 179.0 inhabitants per square mile (69.1/km^{2}). There were 1,993 housing units at an average density of 62.8 per square mile (24.2/km^{2}). The racial makeup of the township was 97.75% White, 0.18% African American, 0.30% Native American, 0.25% Asian, 0.02% Pacific Islander, 0.30% from other races, and 1.22% from two or more races. Hispanic or Latino of any race were 1.07% of the population.

There were 1,902 households, out of which 40.4% had children under the age of 18 living with them, 72.7% were married couples living together, 6.5% had a female householder with no husband present, and 17.7% were non-families. 13.7% of all households were made up of individuals, and 5.2% had someone living alone who was 65 years of age or older. The average household size was 2.91 and the average family size was 3.20.

In the township the population was spread out, with 28.0% under the age of 18, 6.2% from 18 to 24, 31.3% from 25 to 44, 24.2% from 45 to 64, and 10.2% who were 65 years of age or older. The median age was 37 years. For every 100 females, there were 102.3 males. For every 100 females age 18 and over, there were 96.7 males.

The median income for a household in the township was $63,114, and the median income for a family was $67,034. Males had a median income of $50,744 versus $28,958 for females. The per capita income for the township was $23,840. About 1.4% of families and 2.8% of the population were below the poverty line, including 1.3% of those under age 18 and 3.7% of those age 65 or over.
