= M-97 (Michigan highway) =

State highway in Wayne and Macomb counties in Michigan, United States

M-97
- M-97 highlighted in red

Route information
- Maintained by MDOT
- Length: 17.169 mi (27.631 km)
- Existed: 1929–present

Major junctions
- South end: M-3 at Detroit
- M-102 at Warren–Detroit; I-696 near Roseville
- North end: M-59 near Mount Clemens

Location
- Country: United States
- State: Michigan
- Counties: Wayne, Macomb

Highway system
- Michigan State Trunkline Highway System; Interstate; US; State; Byways
← M-96	→ M-98

M-97 is a state trunkline highway in the U.S. state of Michigan. It runs from Detroit to north of Mt. Clemens following Groesbeck Highway. The highway starts south of 7 Mile Road and runs northeasterly through Macomb County suburbs to Hall Road, which takes the place of 20 Mile Road in the Mile Road System. In between the termini, Groesbeck Highway runs through suburban residential and commercial areas.

Groesbeck Highway is named after Alex Groesbeck, former Michigan governor and attorney-general. The road was constructed starting in the 1920s to provide traffic relief to Gratiot Avenue, which was the main route between Detroit and Mt. Clemens. It was created as a state trunkline to facilitate construction financing. The final extension was opened at a ribbon cutting ceremony in 1949. This ceremony also dedicated the entire roadway in the former governor's honor after sections were named for another politician by the state.

== Route description ==
M-97 runs through an urbanized area in the larger Metro Detroit. The highway starts at M-3/Gratiot Avenue and follows Gunston Street northwesterly. This intersection is one block northeast of the Coleman A. Young International Airport in Detroit. At McNichols Road, which forms part of 6 Mile Road in the Mile Road System, M-97 turns north on Hoover Street, and follows it north past Bessy Playground at 7 Mile Road. It continues north on Hoover until it turns onto Groesbeck Highway, just one block south of M-102/8 Mile Road.

Groesbeck Highway runs northeast from Hoover Street crossing out of Wayne County into Macomb County at 8 Mile Road. The trunkline here is parallel to railroad tracks through Warren. M-97 crosses Interstate 696 (I-696) at an interchange located on the Warren–Roseville line. This interchange is also located at the 11 Mile Road location in the Mile Road System. M-97 crosses through the southeast corner of Fraser between 13 Mile and 14 Mile roads after which it enters Clinton Township. There is a major intersection with Metropolitan Parkway, which is a limited access county primary road that occupies the 16 Mile location Detroit Mile Road System. Between this intersection and Harrington Street, Groesbeck Highway curves around to the north, crossing the Clinton River and the railroad then entering Mt. Clemens. M-97 continues to curve around the west side of downtown Mt. Clemens before re-entering Clinton Township. Groesbeck Highway and M-97 ends at M-59/Hall Road, another limited access county primary road in Macomb County located in place of 20 Mile Road. The northern terminus is on the Clinton Township–Macomb Township line northwest of Selfridge Field, an Air National Guard facility on Lake St. Clair. The road continues north as a county road known as North Avenue.

== History ==
The Macomb County Road Commission passed Resolution 15 on October 23, 1925. This resolution authorized the construction of a new roadway 1 mile (1.6 km) west of Gratiot Avenue to relieve traffic traveling between Detroit and Mt. Clemens. The roadway was named in honor of Governor Groesbeck, a Macomb County native and former state attorney general. While the county had difficulty funding the new highway, Groesbeck interceded to have it named a state-financed trunkline. The county started construction on Groesbeck Highway in 1926. The highway was incomplete when Groesbeck left office at the end of 1926, leaving the final paving undone. State Rep. Archie Reid asked the State Administrative Board on December 12, 1927 for assistance to complete the roadway. The board voted unanimously to name the highway for Reid and to proceed "at once" to conclude construction.

The M-97 designation was applied to the roadway in 1929 between M-102/8 Mile Road and 14 Mile Road. An extension in 1931 moved the northern terminus to US Highway 25 (US 25) in Mt. Clemens. A second extension in 1932 moved the southern end into the City of Detroit at US 25/Gratiot Avenue.

Named "Reid Highway" by the state and "Groesbeck Highway" by the county, M-97 was not completed until 1949. On October 29, 1949, the final section bypassing Mt. Clemens along the city's west side was opened and the entire road was dedicated to Groesbeck. The former governor was on hand for the ribbon cutting ceremony which renamed the highway north of Hoover Avenue. The northern end was extended to M-59 (Hall Road).

== Major intersections ==
County	Location	mi	km	Destinations	Notes
Wayne	Detroit	0.000	0.000	M-3 (Gratiot Avenue)	No left turn to northbound M-3
Wayne–Macomb county line	Detroit–Warren city line	2.940	4.731	M-102 (8 Mile Road)	
Macomb	Warren	6.471	10.414	I-696 (W.P. Reuther Freeway)	Exit 26 on I-696
Macomb	Clinton Charter Township	17.169	27.631	M-59 (Hall Road)	Roadway continues north as North Avenue
1.000 mi = 1.609 km; 1.000 km = 0.621 mi
