= Interstate 696 =

Interstate Highway in Oakland and Macomb counties in Michigan, United States

Interstate 696
- Walter P. Reuther Freeway
- I-696 highlighted in red

Route information
- Auxiliary route of I-96
- Maintained by MDOT
- Length: 28.368 mi (45.654 km)
- Existed: 1963–present
- History: Construction started in 1961 and completed December 15, 1989
- NHS: Entire route
- Restrictions: No flammable or explosive cargo between M-10 and I-75

Major junctions
- West end: I-96 / I-275 / M-5 in Farmington Hills
- US 24 / M-10 in Southfield; M-1 in Royal Oak; I-75 near Royal Oak; M-53 in Center Line; M-97 in Warren; M-3 in Roseville
- East end: I-94 in St. Clair Shores

Location
- Country: United States
- State: Michigan
- Counties: Oakland, Macomb

Highway system
- Interstate Highway System; Main; Auxiliary; Suffixed; Business; Future; Michigan State Trunkline Highway System; Interstate; US; State; Byways
| ← I-675 | → M-1 |

Interstate 696 (I-696) is an east–west auxiliary Interstate Highway in the Metro Detroit region of the US state of Michigan. The state trunkline highway is also known as the Walter P. Reuther Freeway, named for the prominent auto industry union head by the Michigan Legislature in 1971. I-696 is a bypass route, detouring around the city of Detroit through the city's northern suburbs in Oakland and Macomb counties. It starts by branching off I-96 and I-275 at its western terminus in Farmington Hills, and runs through suburbs including Southfield, Royal Oak and Warren before merging into I-94 at St. Clair Shores on the east end. It has eight lanes for most of its length and is approximately 10 miles (16 km) north of downtown Detroit. I-696 connects to other freeways such as I-75 (Chrysler Freeway) and M-10 (Lodge Freeway). Local residents sometimes refer to I-696 as "The Autobahn of Detroit".

Planning for the freeway started in the 1950s. Michigan state officials proposed the designation I-98, but this was not approved. Construction started on the first segment in 1961, and the Lodge Freeway was designated Business Spur Interstate 696 (BS I-696) the following year. The western third of the freeway opened in 1963, and the eastern third was completed in January 1979. The central segment was the subject of much controversy during the 1960s and 1970s. Various municipalities along this stretch argued over the routing of the freeway such that the governor locked several officials into a room overnight until they would agree to a routing. Later, various groups used federal environmental regulations to force changes to the freeway. The Orthodox Jewish community in Oak Park was concerned about pedestrian access across the freeway; I-696 was built with a set of parks on overpasses to accommodate their needs. The Detroit Zoo and the City of Detroit also fought components of the freeway design. These concessions delayed the completion of I-696 until December 15, 1989. Since completion, the speed limit was raised from 55 to 70 miles per hour (89 to 113 km/h). In addition, some interchanges were reconfigured in 2006.

== Route description ==
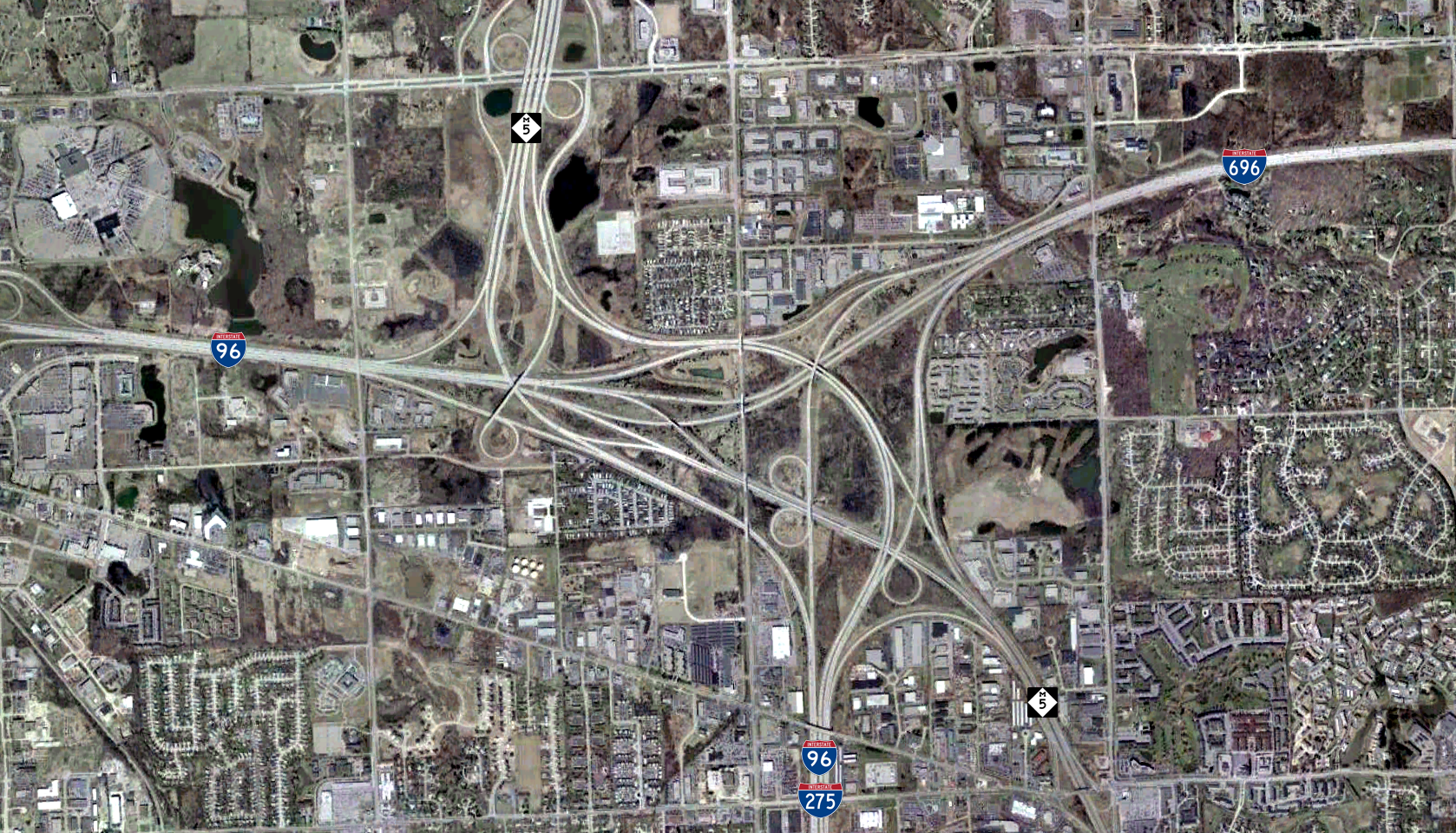
Satellite image of the western terminus in Novi

I-696, which has been called "Detroit's Autobahn" by some residents, reflecting a reputation for fast drivers, begins in the west in the city of Novi as a left exit branching off I-96. This ramp is a portion of the I-96/I-696/I-275/M-5 interchange that spans the north–south, Novi–Farmington Hills city line linking together five converging freeways. The freeway curves southeasterly and then northeasterly through the complex as it runs eastward through the adjacent residential subdivisions. I-696 passes south of 12 Mile Road in the Mile Road System through Farmington Hills, passing south of the former Harrison High School and north of Mercy High School. After crossing into Southfield, I-696 passes through the Mixing Bowl, another complex interchange that spans over two miles (3.2 km) near the American Center involving M-10 (Lodge Freeway and Northwestern Highway) and US Highway 24 (US 24, Telegraph Road) between two partial interchanges with Franklin Road on the west and Lahser Road on the east. The carriageways for I-696 run in the median of M-10 from northwest to southeast. East of this interchange, cargo restrictions have been enacted for the next 10-mile-long (16 km) segment of I-696; no commercial vehicles may carry flammable or explosive loads; the segment passes below grade and between retaining walls that are 20–25 feet (6.1–7.6 m) tall, which would hinder evacuation in the event of a fire. During construction in April 1989, vandals set a fire under one of the plazas, and officials were concerned about the intensity of the fire and the potential for a "horizontal towering inferno" along the freeway section once opened to traffic.

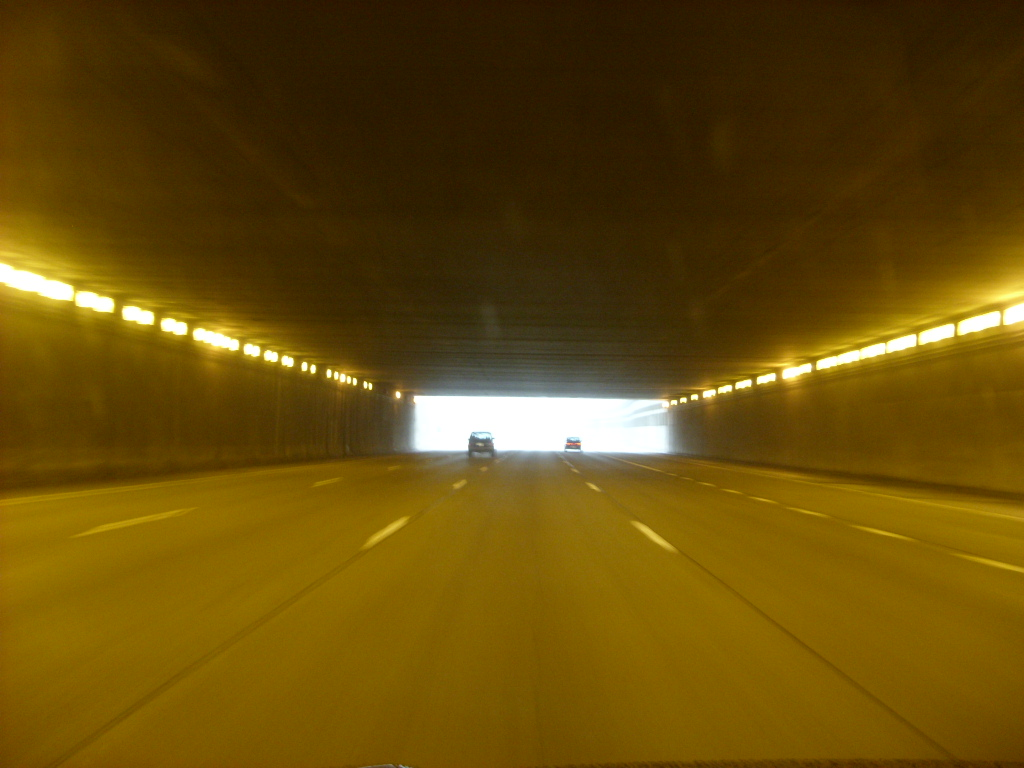
View in one of the tunnels formed by the plazas over the freeway in Oak Park

After passing through the Mixing Bowl, I-696 follows 11 Mile Road, which forms a pair of service drives for the main freeway. The Interstate passes through the city of Lathrup Village before turning southward and then easterly on an S-shaped path to run along 10 Mile Road. This segment of freeway is known for its extensive use of retaining walls; three large landscaped plazas form short tunnels for freeway traffic near the Greenfield Road exit. The freeway passes next to the Jewish Community Center of Metropolitan Detroit as it passes under the third pedestrian plaza. The Interstate then picks up 10 Mile Road, which forms a pair of service drives, as the Reuther runs along the border between the cities of Oak Park and Huntington Woods. I-696 follows the southern edge of the Detroit Zoo. Immediately east of the zoo, the Interstate intersects M-1 (Woodward Avenue), and crosses a line of the Canadian National Railway that also carries Amtrak passenger service between Detroit and Pontiac.

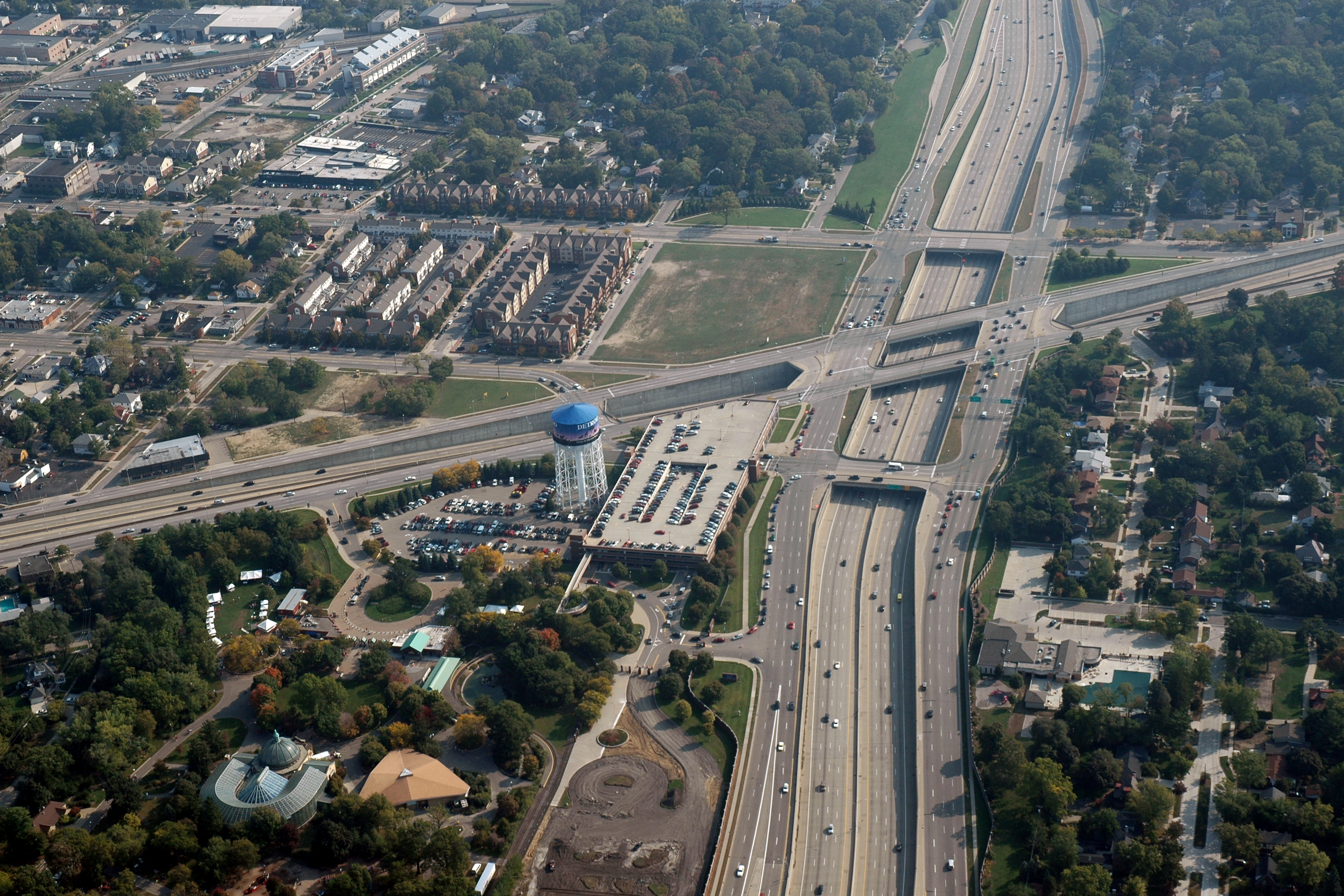
Aerial view of the Detroit Zoo, I-696 and M-1 (Woodward Avenue)

East of the rail crossing, I-696 has a four-level stack interchange with I-75 over the quadripoint for Royal Oak, Madison Heights, Hazel Park and Ferndale. This interchange marks the eastern end of the cargo restrictions. I-696 jogs to the northeast near the Hazel Park Raceway, leaving 10 Mile Road. Crossing into Warren in Macomb County at the Dequindre Road interchange, the freeway begins to follow 11 Mile Road again. Near the Detroit Arsenal Tank Plant, I-696 has another stack interchange for Mound Road; through the junction, the freeway makes a slight bend to the south. The freeway continues east through the northern edge of Center Line, crossing a line of Conrail Shared Assets and heading back into Warren. The Interstate crosses into Roseville near the M-97 (Groesbeck Highway) interchange and then meets M-3 (Gratiot Avenue) just west of the eastern terminus at I-94 (the Edsel Ford Freeway) in St. Clair Shores. The service drives merge in this final interchange and 11 Mile Road continues due east to Lake St. Clair.

Like other state highways in Michigan, I-696 is maintained by the Michigan Department of Transportation (MDOT). In 2011, the department's traffic surveys showed that on average 185,700 vehicles used the freeway daily east of I-75 and 38,100 vehicles did so each day in part of the Mixing Bowl, the highest and lowest counts along the highway, respectively. As an Interstate Highway, all of I-696 is listed on the National Highway System.

== History ==
=== Planning and initial construction ===
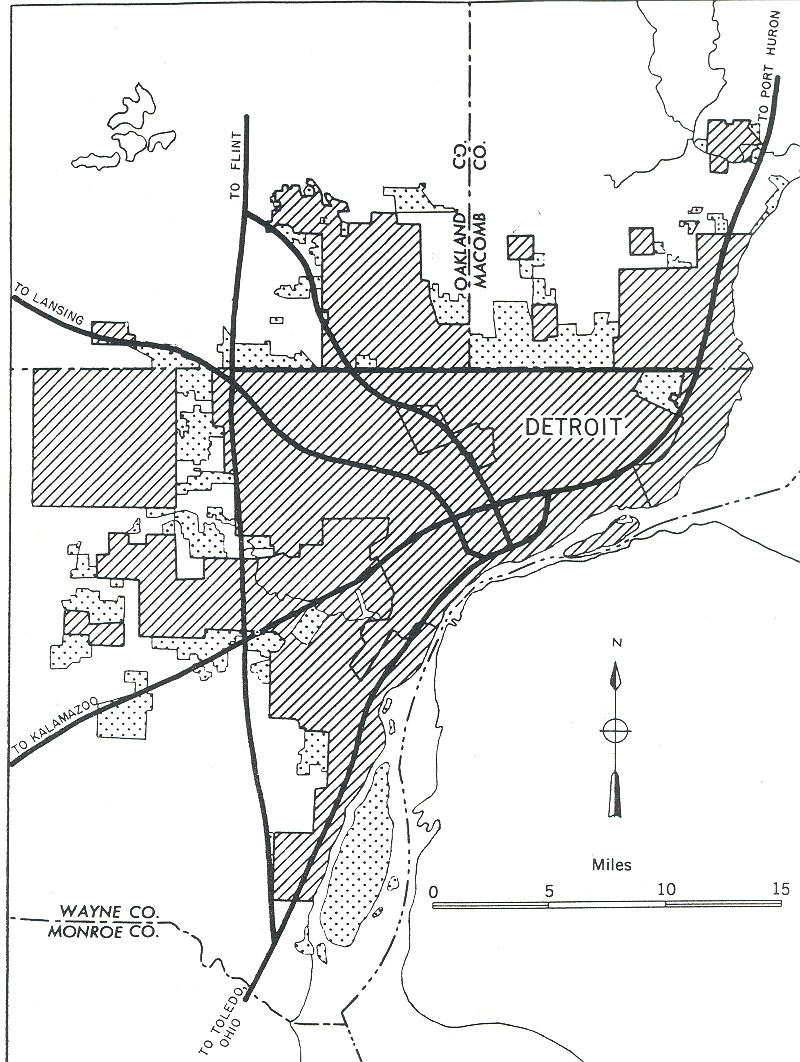
1955 planning map for Detroit's Interstate Highways

I-696 is part of the original Interstate Highway System as outlined in 1956–58. As originally proposed by the Michigan State Highway Department, the freeway would have been numbered I-98. Construction started in 1961. The Lodge Freeway, the first segment of which opened in 1957, was given the Business Spur I-696 designation in 1962. The first segment of I-696 built was the western third of the completed freeway which opened in 1963–1964 at a cost of $16.6 million (equivalent to $128 million in 2024). This section ran from I-96 in Novi east to the Lodge Freeway in Southfield. The then-unfinished freeway was named for Walter P. Reuther, former leader of the United Auto Workers labor union after he and his wife died in a plane crash on May 9, 1970. The next year the Michigan Legislature approved the naming by passing Senate Concurrent Resolution 57.

In the late 1970s, during the second phase of construction, lobbying efforts and lawsuits attempted to block construction of the central section. If successful, the efforts would have left the freeway with a gap in the middle between the first (western) and second (eastern) phases of construction. During this time, MDOT assigned M-6 to the eastern section of the freeway under construction. Signs were erected along the service roads that followed 11 Mile Road to connect the already built stack interchange at I-75 east to I-94. By the time the eastern freeway segment was initially opened in January 1979 between I-94 and I-75, the signage for M-6 was removed and replaced with I-696 signage; it cost $200 million (equivalent to $695 million in 2024) to complete. Later in 1979, a closure was scheduled to allow work to be completed on three of the segment's nine interchanges.

=== Controversies over middle segment ===
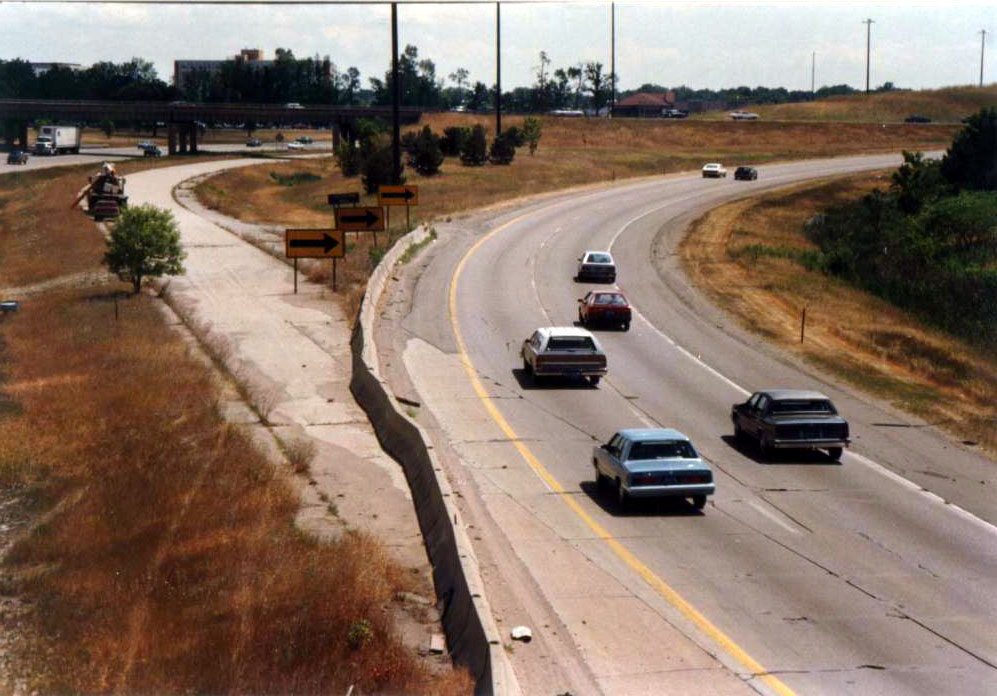
Prior to the opening of the central portion of I-696 in the late 1980s, eastbound traffic in Southfield, as seen here in July 1988, was routed to southbound M-10 near the Telegraph Road exit (now exit 8); the once-abandoned portion of I-696 appears to the left.

The central section was the most controversial. Governor James Blanchard was 15 years old and a high school sophomore in neighboring Pleasant Ridge when the freeway was proposed and purchased a home in the area in 1972. He joked during remarks at the dedication in 1989, "The unvarnished truth about this freeway? I wasn't even alive when it was first proposed," and added, "frankly, I never thought it would go through." Total cost at completion for the entire freeway at the end of the 30-year project was $675 million (equivalent to $1.48 billion in 2024).

Arguments between local officials were so intense that during the 1960s, then-Governor George W. Romney once locked fighting bureaucrats in a community center until they would agree on a path for the freeway. During the 1970s, local groups used then-new environmental regulations to oppose the Interstate. The freeway was noted in a Congressional subcommittee report on the "Major Interstate System Route Controversy in Urban Areas" for the controversies in 1970. Before 1967, local communities had to approve highway locations and designs, and the debates over I-696 prompted the passage of an arbitration statute. That statute was challenged by Pleasant Ridge and Lathrup Village before being upheld by the Michigan Supreme Court. Lathrup Village later withdrew from a planning agreement in 1971; had that agreement been implemented, construction on the central section was scheduled to commence in 1974 and finish in 1976.

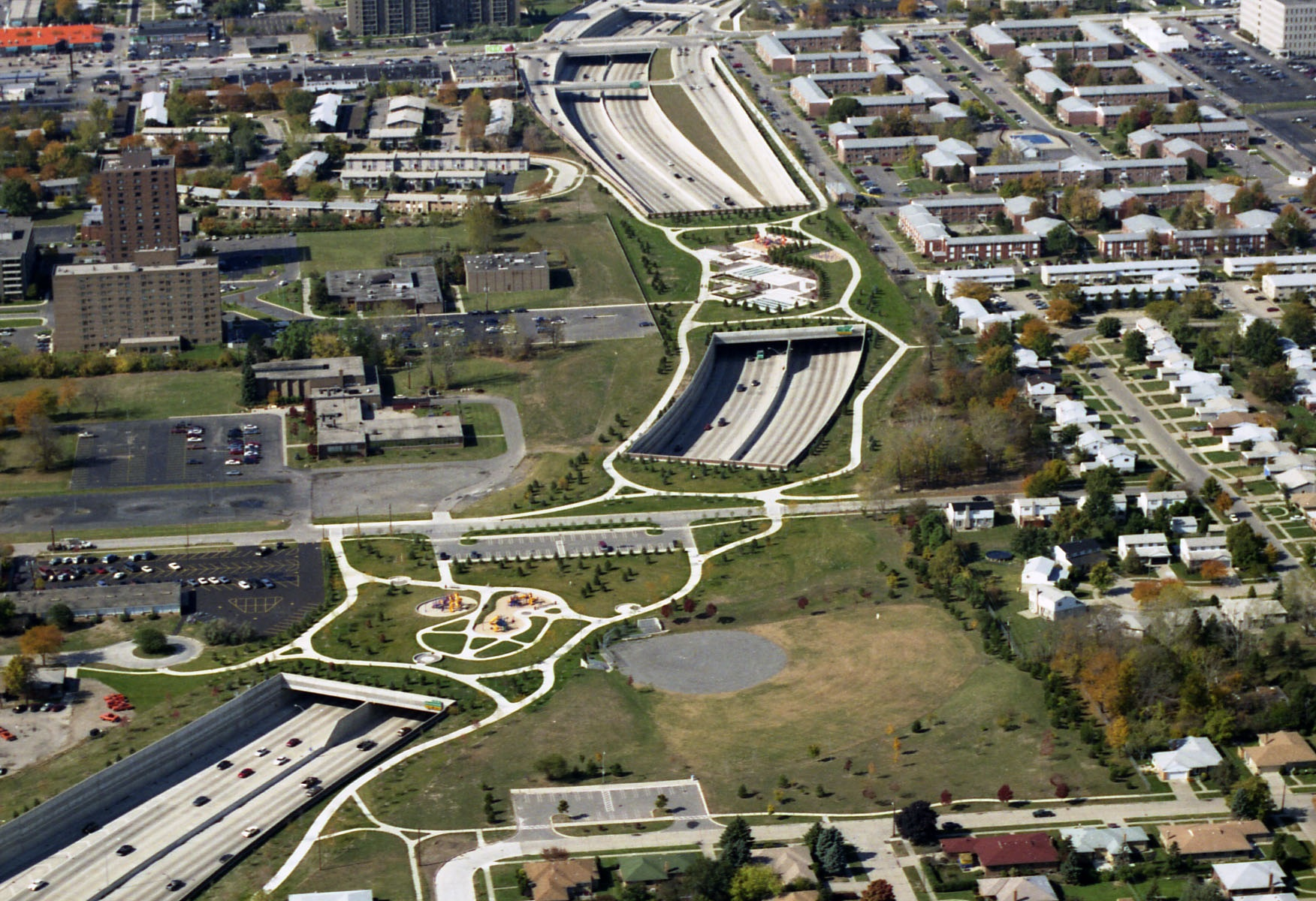
Pedestrian plazas in Oak Park

The community of Orthodox Jews in Oak Park wanted the freeway to pass to the north of their suburb. When this was deemed to be futile, the community asked for changes to the design that would mitigate the impact of the freeway to the pedestrian-dependent community. Final approval in 1981 of the freeway's alignment was contingent on these mitigation measures. To address the community's unique needs, the state hired a rabbi to serve as a consultant on the project. In addition, a series of landscaped plazas were incorporated into the design, forming the tunnels through which I-696 passes. These structures are a set of three 700-foot-wide (210 m) bridges that cross the freeway within a mile (1.6 km). They allow members of the Jewish community to walk to synagogues on the Sabbath and other holidays when Jewish law prohibits driving. These plazas had their length limited; if they were longer, they would be considered tunnels that would require ventilation systems.

The Detroit Zoo was concerned that noise and air pollution from the Interstate would disturb the animals. They were satisfied by $12 million (equivalent to $26.3 million in 2024) spent on a new parking ramp and other improvements. The City of Detroit tried to stop I-696 as well, but in the end the city was forced to redesign its golf course. A refusal to grant an additional nine feet (2.7 m) of right-of-way by Detroit forced additional design and construction delays during the 1980s.

One of the last obstacles to construction of the freeway was a wetlands area near Southfield. MDOT received a permit from the Michigan Department of Natural Resources to destroy 6 1/2 acres (2.6 ha) of wetland and create a replacement 11-acre (4.5 ha) area. In the process, some prairie roses and wetlands milkweed were transplanted from the path of I-696 in 1987. The final section of the eight-lane freeway opened at a cost of $436 million (equivalent to $957 million in 2024) on December 15, 1989. At the time, one caller to a Detroit radio show commented, "do you realize we have been to the moon and back in the time it has taken to get that road from Ferndale to Southfield?"

=== Since completion ===
As part of the overall rehabilitation to the Mixing Bowl interchange, a new interchange at Franklin Road was to be constructed in 2006. An exit ramp from I-696 eastbound to American Drive opened in April 2006. An entrance ramp from Franklin Road to I-696 westbound opened in July 2006. The Franklin Road overpass, which had been closed during this time, re-opened in October 2006.

On November 9, 2006, the speed limit was increased from 65 to 70 mph (105 to 113 km/h) along the length of I-696. During speed enforcement patrols in August 2022, the Michigan State Police gave out 77 citations during one 4-hour period including six arrests. One motorist was driving at 101 mph (163 km/h), while others were cited at 99, 94, and 91 mph (159, 151, and 146 km/h).

MDOT started a project called "Restore the Reuther" to repair the freeway in Oakland County and reconstruct the section between Dequindre Road and I-94 in Macomb County. This project also involved some pavement repairs and minor structure repairs on the section from I-275/M-5 to Dequindre. In 2019, reconstruction started on the section between Dequindre Road and I-94. In phase 1, the westbound lanes were closed and detoured. In phase 2, the westbound lanes remained closed, but eastbound lanes were shifted on the westbound lanes. No entrance ramps were open, however there were limited exit ramps open.

In 2023, MDOT started a complete reconstruction of I-696 from I-275 in Farmington Hills to US 24 (Telegraph Road) in Southfield. The eastbound lanes were reconstructed in 2023, and the westbound lanes were reconstructed the following year.

In 2025, MDOT began a two-year project to completely rebuild the middle section of I-696. It involved a complete two-year closure of the eastbound lanes starting from exit 8 to the I-696/I-75 interchange. As part of the project, 60 bridges will be repaired, including the rebuilding of the Church Street Plaza bridge that contains Victoria Park. During that rebuild, a walkway detour will be in place. The project will also include pavement upgrades and updates to 1,100 drainage structures, according to MDOT. In 2027, MDOT plans to finish the project by reconstructing I-696 from the I-75 interchange to Dequindre Road.

== Exit list ==
| County | Location | mi | km | Exit | Destinations | Notes |
|---|---|---|---|---|---|---|
| Oakland | Novi–Farmington Hills city line | 0.000– 1.371 | 0.000– 2.206 | 1 | I-96 east / I-275 south – Toledo I-96 west – Lansing; M-5 (Grand River Avenue) | Exits 163 and 165 on I-96, western terminus |
| Oakland | Farmington Hills | 4.570– 4.635 | 7.355– 7.459 | 5 | Orchard Lake Road | |
| Oakland | Southfield | 7.363– 7.489 | 11.850– 12.052 | 7 | American Drive | Eastbound exit and westbound entrance via Franklin Road |
| Oakland | Southfield | 7.763– 8.241 | 12.493– 13.263 | 8 | M-10 south (Lodge Freeway) to US 24 (Telegraph Road) | Eastbound exit and westbound entrance to M-10; eastbound exit and entrance to US 24; eastbound exit to Lahser Road via M-10 exit 16 |
| Oakland | Southfield | 10.040 | 16.158 | 10 | M-10 north (Northwestern Highway) to US 24 (Telegraph Road) / Lahser Road | Westbound exit and eastbound entrance to M-10; westbound exit and entrance to US 24; westbound entrance from Lahser Road via M-10 exit 16 |
| Oakland | Southfield–Lathrup Village city line | 10.444– 11.300 | 16.808– 18.186 | 11 | Evergreen Road | |
| Oakland | Lathrup Village | 11.474– 12.359 | 18.466– 19.890 | 12 | 11 Mile Road, Southfield Road | |
| Oakland | Southfield–Oak Park city line | 13.008– 13.646 | 20.934– 21.961 | 13 | Greenfield Road | |
| Oakland | Oak Park–Huntington Woods city line | 13.982– 14.824 | 22.502– 23.857 | 14 | 10 Mile Road, Coolidge Highway, Detroit Zoo | Detroit Zoo signed eastbound only; 10 Mile Road signed westbound only |
| Oakland | Pleasant Ridge–Royal Oak city line | 15.743– 16.692 | 25.336– 26.863 | 16 | M-1 (Woodward Avenue) / Main Street – Detroit Zoo | Detroit Zoo signed westbound only |
| Oakland | Royal Oak | 16.909 | 27.212 | 17 | Campbell Road, Hilton Road | Eastbound exit and westbound entrance; Campbell Road becomes Hilton Road immediately south of exit |
| Oakland | Royal Oak | 17.373– 17.378 | 27.959– 27.967 | 17 | Bermuda Street | Westbound exit and eastbound entrance |
| Oakland | Royal Oak–Madison Heights–Hazel Park–Ferndale city quadripoint | 17.706– 18.292 | 28.495– 29.438 | 18 | I-75 (Chrysler Freeway) – Flint, Detroit, Toledo | Exit 61 on I-75 |
| Oakland | Madison Heights | 18.647– 18.668 | 30.009– 30.043 | 19 | Couzens Avenue, 10 Mile Road | Eastbound exit and westbound entrance |
| Oakland–Macomb county line | Madison Heights–Warren city line | 19.258– 19.966 | 30.993– 32.132 | 20 | Dequindre Road, Ryan Road, John R Road | Dequindre Road is the county line; Ryan Road signed eastbound only, John R Road signed westbound only |
| Macomb | Warren | 20.523 | 33.029 | 21 | 11 Mile Road | Westbound exit and eastbound entrance |
| Macomb | Warren | 21.512– 22.340 | 34.620– 35.953 | 22 | Mound Road | |
| Macomb | Center Line–Warren city line | 22.611– 23.160 | 36.389– 37.272 | 23 | M-53 (Van Dyke Avenue) / Ryan Road | Ryan Road signed westbound only |
| Macomb | Warren | 23.666– 24.344 | 38.087– 39.178 | 24 | Hoover Road, Schoenherr Road | Schoenherr Road signed eastbound only |
| Macomb | Warren | 25.166– 26.259 | 40.501– 42.260 | 26 | M-97 (Groesbeck Highway) / Schoenherr Road | Schoenherr Road signed westbound only |
| Macomb | Roseville | 27.083– 27.771 | 43.586– 44.693 | 27 | M-3 (Gratiot Avenue) | |
| Macomb | Roseville | 27.970– 27.991 | 45.013– 45.047 | 28 | 11 Mile Road | Eastbound exit and westbound entrance |
| Macomb | St. Clair Shores | 28.271– 28.368 | 45.498– 45.654 | — | I-94 (Edsel Ford Freeway) – Detroit, Port Huron | Exit 229 on I-94, eastern terminus |
1.000 mi = 1.609 km; 1.000 km = 0.621 mi: Incomplete access

== Related trunkline ==
Business Spur Interstate 696
- Location: Detroit–Southfield
- Length: 17.538 mi (28.225 km)
- Existed: 1962–1970

Business Spur Interstate 696 (BS I-696) was the designation given to the Lodge Freeway in the Detroit area in 1962. This 17 1/2-mile-long (28.2 km) freeway was renumbered as part of US 10 in 1970, when that highway designation was shifted off Woodward Avenue.
