= Livingston County Spencer J. Hardy Airport =

Coordinates: 42°37′46″N 083°58′56″W

- IATA: none; ICAO: KOZW; FAA LID: OZW

Summary
- Airport type: Public
- Owner: Livingston County
- Location: Howell, Michigan
- Elevation AMSL: 962 ft / 293 m

Map
- Location of airport in Michigan OZW (the United States)

Runways
Direction	Length		Surface
Direction	ft	m	Surface
13/31	5,002	1,525	Concrete

Statistics (2021)
- Aircraft operations: 45,000
- Source: Federal Aviation Administration

Livingston County Spencer J. Hardy Airport (ICAO: KOZW, FAA LID: OZW) is a county-owned public-use airport located three miles (5 km) northwest of the central business district of Howell, a city in Livingston County, Michigan, United States. It is included in the Federal Aviation Administration (FAA) National Plan of Integrated Airport Systems for 2017–2021, in which it is categorized as a regional reliever airport facility.

Although most U.S. airports use the same three-letter location identifier for the FAA and IATA, Livingston County Spencer J. Hardy Airport is assigned OZW by the FAA but has no designation from the IATA.

== History ==
The airport was originally on land where an elementary school currently sits, near an area where baseball and softball games were played. The airport received a single air mail flight in the late 1930s, drawing significant attention from the town.

The airport was moved to its current location in the 1940s, and Livingston County purchased it for $1 in the 1960s. The airport was soon expanded and received its first paved runway. The current airport terminal was built in the mid-1960s, followed by T-hangars in the 1970s.

The airport got a runway extension in 1988 as business aircraft became more advanced, and a full-length, lighted parallel taxiway was also constructed. A weather observation system was commissioned soon after.

In the 2010s, airport expansions were approved multiple times when the airport was allowed to lease new land for hangars.

In 2021, the airport received a grant from the federal Bipartisan Infrastructure Law to improve runway facilities, airport/transit connections, and nearby roadway projects.

The airport generates $1.5 million in direct economic benefits and over $25 million in total economic benefits to the community.

== Facilities and aircraft ==
Livingston County Spencer J. Hardy Airport covers an area of 217 acres (88 ha) which contains one runway designated 13/31 with a 5,002 x 100 ft (1,525 x 30 m) concrete surface.

For the 12-month period ending December 31, 2021, the airport had almost 45,000 aircraft operations, or 123 per day. It was all general aviation. For the same time period, there are 115 aircraft based on the airport: 89 single-engine and 154single engine airplanes, 7 jets, and 5 helicopters.

The airport is staffed Monday through Friday from 7 a.m. until 5 p.m., and Saturday and Sunday from 8 a.m. until 12 p.m. It has a fixed-base operator offering fuel, catering, aircraft parking, courtesy cars, conference rooms, a crew lounge, snooze rooms, and showers. It is accessible by road from County Airport Drive, and is close to M-59 and I-96.

== Gallery ==
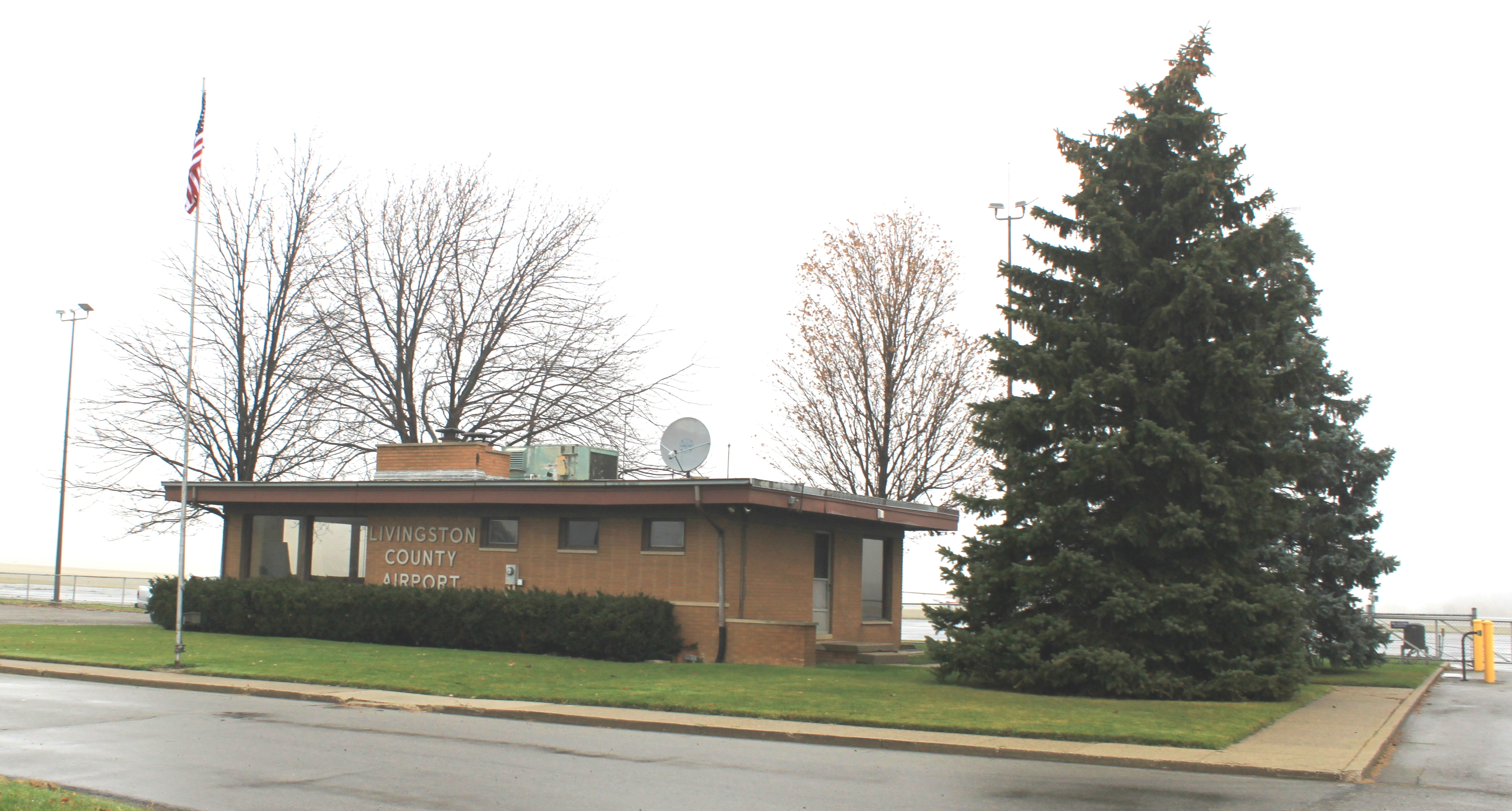
Airport terminal exterior

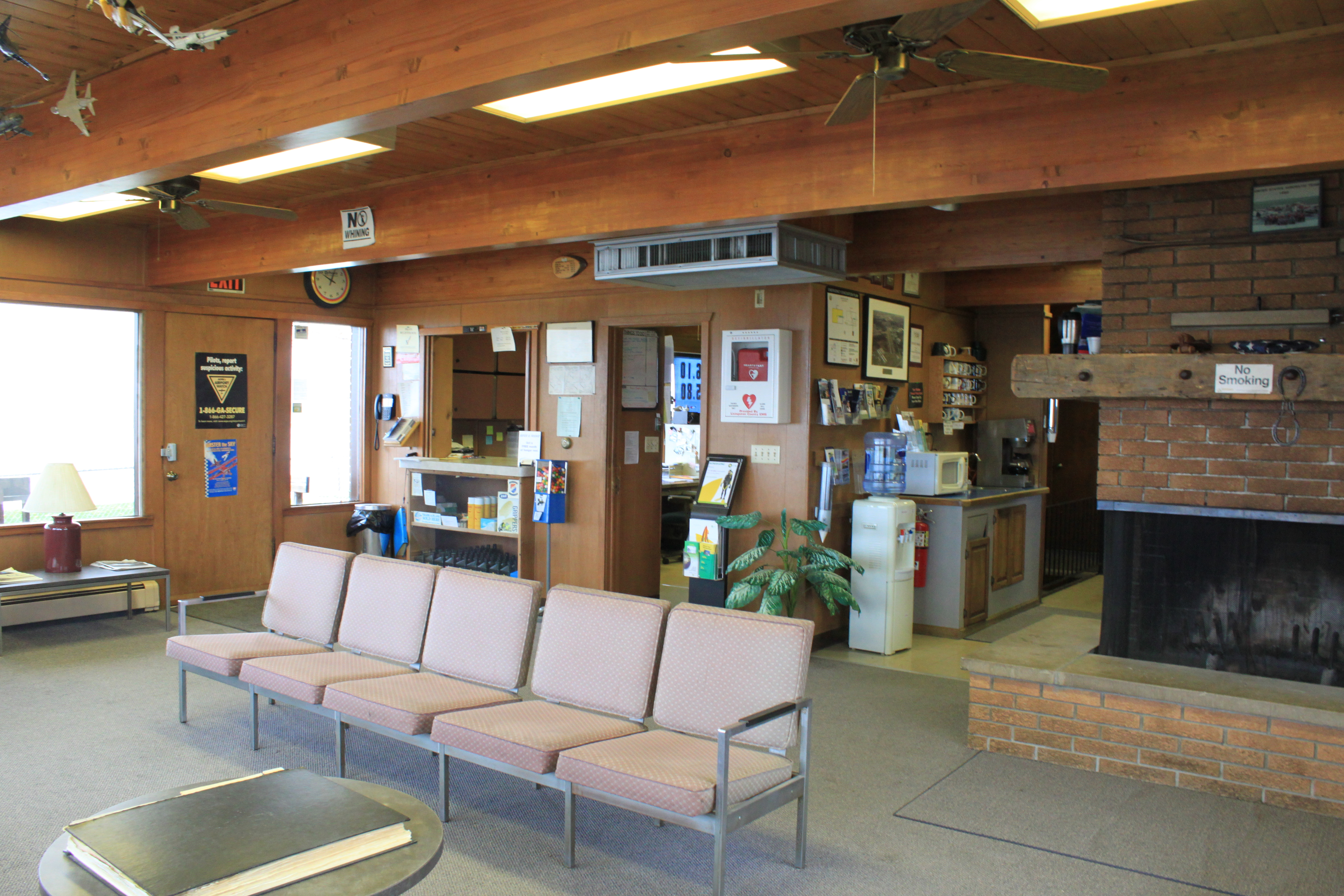
Airport terminal interior

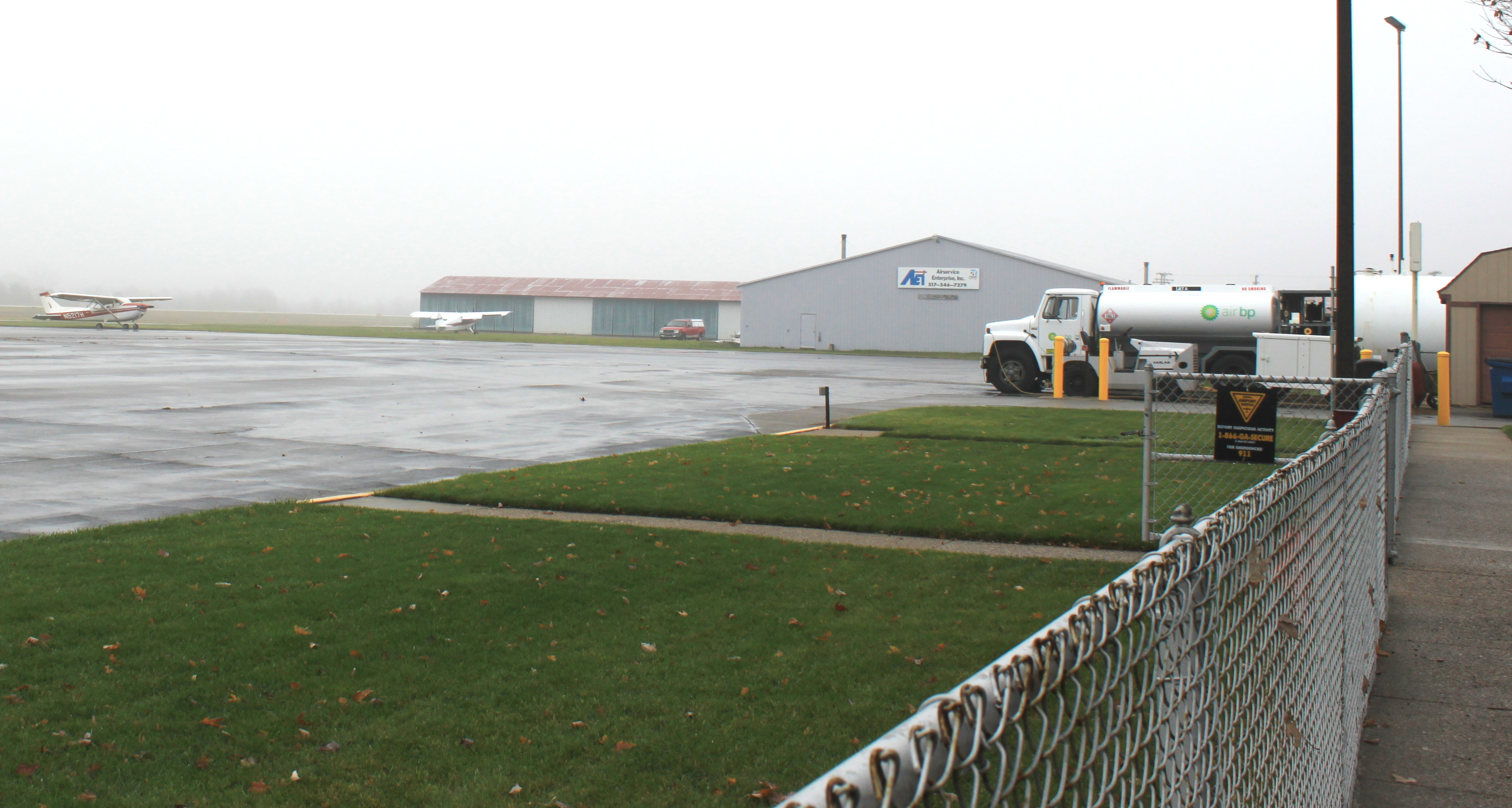
Airport tarmac and hangars

== Accidents and incidents ==
- In January 2017, a private Cessna Citation jet overshot the runway in Livingston, crashing through an airport fence and came to rest on a nearby road.
- On August 20, 2019, an Aero Commander crashed while attempting to land at Hardy Airport. The two on board were killed. The crash was eventually blamed on a faulty air filter that became dislodged and blocked air from getting into the engine, causing a loss of engine power.
- On September 16, 2021, a Mooney M20 landed in a field while trying to make an emergency landing in Livingston.

== See also ==
- List of airports in Michigan
