= M-59 (Michigan highway) =

State highway in Michigan, United States

M-59
- M-59 highlighted in red

Route information
- Maintained by MDOT
- Length: 60.514 mi (97.388 km)
- Existed: c. July 1, 1919–present

Major junctions
- West end: I-96 in Howell
- US 23 near Howell; US 24 in Pontiac; BL I-75 / Bus. US 24 in Pontiac; I-75 in Auburn Hills; M-150 in Rochester Hills; M-53 in Utica; M-97 near Mount Clemens; M-3 near Mount Clemens
- East end: I-94 near Mount Clemens

Location
- Country: United States
- State: Michigan
- Counties: Livingston, Oakland, Macomb

Highway system
- Michigan State Trunkline Highway System; Interstate; US; State; Byways
← M-58	→ M-60

M-59 is an east–west state trunkline highway that crosses the northern part of Metropolitan Detroit in the US state of Michigan. It runs between Howell at Interstate 96 (I-96) and I-94 on the Chesterfield–Harrison township line near the Selfridge Air National Guard Base. While primarily a multi-lane surface highway, it is a full freeway from just east of downtown Pontiac near Opdyke Road to just east of the Mound Road/Merrill Road exit in Utica. The various surface highway segments are named either Highland Road, Huron Street or Hall Road, with the latter known as an area for shopping and dining. The rural sections west of Pontiac pass through Oakland County lake country, passing through two state recreational areas.

M-59 was first designated with the rest of the original state trunkline highway system by July 1, 1919 between Pontiac and Mt. Clemens. Extensions on both ends brought the termini as far as Howell and New Baltimore before the current termini were established in the 1960s. M-59 was expanded into a freeway in the late 1960s and early 1970s, with additional expansions in the 1980s and 1990s to create the divided highway sections.

== Route description ==
M-59 starts at I-96 in Howell Township as Highland Road near a large outlet mall. Highland Road carries M-59 concurrently with the westernmost section of Business Loop I-96 (BL I-96). Highland Road widens out into a boulevard south of the county airport before the roadway reaches Grand River Avenue. At this intersection, BL I-96 departs to the southwest. This section of Howell is mostly residential with tree-lined streets. The boulevard section ends near Thompson Lake and M-59 continues east through rural Livingston County as a two-lane highway crossing forested and residential areas. Halfway across Hartland Township, M-59 meets the US Highway 23 (US 23) freeway near the Hartland Plaza Shopping Center, and Highland Road widens out to a boulevard divided highway again. The route passes several small lakes and continues east into Oakland County. Running through the Highland State Recreational Area, M-59 swings to the north through rural Oakland County's lake country which comprises several lakes in dense forest lands and residential subdivisions that form the northern edge of the Metropolitan Detroit area. There is a brief gap in the Highland SRA where M-59 narrows back to two-lane road. Near Brendel Lake and the Alpine Valley Ski Area, Highland Road narrows back to two lanes for the final time. The narrowed roadway continues east, crossing the southern edge of Pontiac Lake in the state recreational area of the same name.

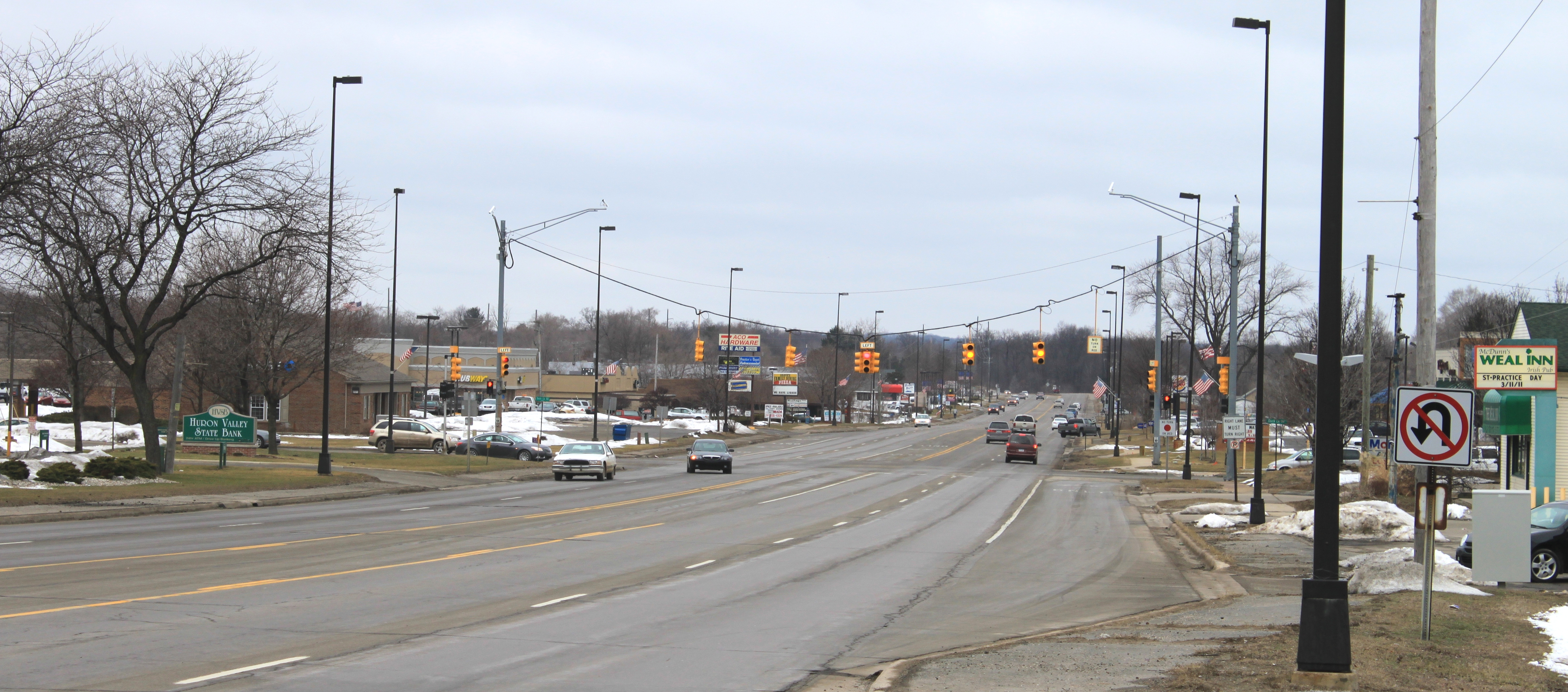
M-59 (Highland Road) east of Duck Lake Road in Highland

The next major landmark along M-59 is the Oakland County International Airport in Waterford Township. Highland Road begins to curve back to the south through denser suburbs as it approaches the outskirts of Pontiac. The Highland Road name gives way to Huron Street near Sylvan Lake, and M-59 crosses Telegraph Road, which carries US 24 and marks the boundary with Pontiac. Eastbound M-59 continues along Huron Street into downtown Pontiac where it crosses the northern end of Woodward Avenue, which is part of the two business loops that encircle the central business district while westbound M-59 bypasses downtown Pontiac as it follows the northern loop of Woodward. East of downtown Pontiac, M-59 widens out into a full freeway. This freeway provides access to the south side of the former Pontiac Silverdome, once the home of the Detroit Lions. To the east of the former stadium in Auburn Hills is the cloverleaf interchange with I-75 and the North American corporate headquarters of car maker Chrysler. Continuing east through the northern Detroit suburbs, the M-59 freeway curves back to the south and crosses into Macomb County at the Dequindre Road interchange. Trucks carrying explosive or flammable cargo are required to exit the M-59 freeway and use the parallel service drive through the Mound Road-Merrill Road interchange just west of Utica.

The M-59 freeway crosses the border between Sterling Heights and Shelby Township and ends at Van Dyke Avenue in Utica, where M-59 becomes a boulevard called Hall Road. The highway crosses the Clinton River and the southern end of the M-53 freeway. This section of the highway is somewhat of a "main street" in Macomb County, as it is home to a wide variety of shopping and dining including Lakeside Mall in Sterling Heights and The Mall at Partridge Creek in Clinton Township. Although it is neither officially designated nor commonly referred to as such, the Hall Road portion of M-59 is coextensive with "20 Mile Road" in the Detroit Mile Road system. Near its eastern terminus, M-59 crosses both M-97 (Groesbeck Highway) and M-3 (Gratiot Avenue). East of Gratiot, Hall Road is called the William P. Rosso Highway. M-59 ends at the freeway interchange with I-94 while Rosso Highway continues along the northern edge of Selfridge Air National Guard Base to Lake St. Clair.

== History ==
M-59 was first designated by July 1, 1919 between M-10 (now Bus. US 24) in Pontiac and M-19 (later US 25 and now M-3) in Mt. Clemens. It would be moved to follow Hall Road exclusively on the east end in 1932. The west end was extended in 1936 to end at the Livingston–Oakland county line. The extension to US 23 in Hartland was finished by 1938. The east end was extended again in 1939 along US 25 and over to M-29 in New Baltimore. The east end was rerouted again between Mt. Clemens and New Baltimore over another former alignment of M-29 in late 1947 or early 1948. The eastern terminus was truncated to M-29 east of US 25/Gratiot Avenue in 1961.

Another extension on the west end moved M-59 to end at US 16 in Howell by 1960. The west end was extended with the new BL I-96 in Howell to end at the newly opened I-96 freeway in 1962. The east end was rerouted to end at I-94 in 1963.

M-59 was converted into a freeway starting in 1966 with the first segment between Pontiac and Auburn Road near Rochester. A second segment opened in 1972 east to Mound Road in Utica. Segments were converted to divided highway in Oakland County in 1984 through 1986. The east end was reconstructed in 1995–97 and converted to a six- to eight-lane divided highway. The freeway was extended east in 1998 to Van Dyke Avenue in Utica; the same year, the eastern end was rerouted off Gratiot Avenue and 23 Mile Road to end at a different interchange with I-94, eliminating the concurrency with M-3. The old routing of M-59 along Auburn Road in Rochester Hills is still maintained by MDOT.

In 2010, MDOT started the process of expanding M-59 from two lanes to three in each direction between Crooks Road and Ryan Road, using funding from the Federal stimulus bill of 2009. With this improvement, M-59 is now at least three lanes each way from I-75 to I-94.

In 2017, MDOT started the reconstruction of M-59 (Hall Road) from M-53 to Romeo Plank Rd. This construction is expected to last through 2018.

== Major intersections ==
County	Location	mi	km	Exit	Destinations	Notes
Livingston	Howell Township	0.000	0.000		I-96 – Lansing, Detroit BL I-96 east	Western end of BL I-96 concurrency; exit 133 on I-96
Livingston	Howell Township	1.004	1.616		BL I-96 east (Grand River Avenue) – Downtown Howell	Eastern end of BL I-96 concurrency
Livingston	Hartland Township	12.719	20.469		US 23 – Ann Arbor, Flint	Exit 67 on US 23
Oakland	Waterford Township–Pontiac city line	35.577	57.256		US 24 (Telegraph Road) – Clarkston, Southfield	
Oakland	Pontiac	37.311	60.046		BL I-75 / Bus. US 24 (Woodward Avenue) to M-1 – Birmingham	Eastbound M-59 routes through downtown Pontiac; westbound M-59 follows the northern loop around the downtown where it overlaps BL I-75 and Bus. US 24
Oakland	Pontiac	37.874	60.952	—	University Drive	Eastbound entrance and westbound exit; western end of freeway
Oakland	Pontiac	38.557	62.051	38	Martin Luther King Jr. Boulevard	
Oakland	Pontiac–Auburn Hills city line	39.582	63.701	39	Opdyke Road	
Oakland	Auburn Hills	40.153– 40.229	64.620– 64.742	40	I-75 – Detroit, Flint	Signed as exit 40A (south) and 40B (north); exit 77 on I-75
Oakland	Auburn Hills	41.108	66.157	41	Squirrel Road	Signed as exit 41A (south) and 41B (north) eastbound
Oakland	Rochester Hills	42.472	68.352	42	Adams Road	Westbound exit via Hamlin Road
Oakland	Rochester Hills	43.640	70.232	44	Crooks Road	
Oakland	Rochester Hills	46.077	74.154	46	M-150 (Rochester Road) – Rochester Hills, Troy	
Oakland–Macomb county line	Rochester Hills–Shelby Township city line	48.157	77.501	48	Dequindre Road	Eastbound exit and entrance via South Boulevard/Dobry Drive
Macomb	Shelby Township–Sterling Heights city line	50.161	80.726	50	Mound Road, Merrill Road	
Macomb	Utica	51.080	82.205	Eastern end of freeway		
Macomb	Utica–Sterling Heights city line	52.176	83.969		M-53 – Detroit, Imlay City	Exit 17 on M-53
Macomb	Macomb–Clinton township line	59.168	95.222		M-97 south (Groesbeck Highway) / North Avenue	Northern terminus of M-97
Macomb	Macomb–Clinton township line	59.942	96.467		M-3 (Gratiot Avenue) – Mt. Clemens	Known as "William P. Rosso Highway" east of M-3
Macomb	Chesterfield–Harrison township line	60.496– 60.514	97.359– 97.388		I-94 – Detroit, Port Huron	Exit 240 on I-94; roadway continues eastbound as William P. Rosso Highway
1.000 mi = 1.609 km; 1.000 km = 0.621 mi: Concurrency terminus; Incomplete access
