= M-151 (Michigan highway) =

M-151, was formerly the designation of two different state trunkline highways in the US state of Michigan.

- M-151 was the original designation of US Highway 12 (US 12) between Niles and Union, Michigan between 1931 and 1935; and
- M-151 was the original designation of US 223 in Whiteford Township between Memorial Highway and the US 23 freeway between 1935 and 1977.

Browse numbered routes
← M-150	MI	→ M-152
