= M-150 (Michigan highway) =

State highway in Oakland County, Michigan, United States

M-150
- Rochester Road
- M-150 highlighted in red

Route information
- Maintained by MDOT
- Length: 4.767 mi (7.672 km)
- Existed: c. 1930–present

Major junctions
- South end: M-59 in Rochester Hills
- North end: Tienken Road in Rochester

Location
- Country: United States
- State: Michigan
- Counties: Oakland

Highway system
- Michigan State Trunkline Highway System; Interstate; US; State; Byways
| ← M-149 | → M-151 |

M-150 is a state trunkline highway in the US state of Michigan that runs through Rochester Hills and Rochester. It is more commonly known as Rochester Road and runs from a southern terminus at the M-59 freeway north through downtown Rochester to a northern terminus at Tienken Road. M-150 has been a state trunkline since around 1930, and within a few years of its commissioning, it was extended south through Royal Oak and north into rural Oakland County. After changes in the 1960s, the highway terminated in Troy at Interstate 75 (I-75) on the southern end and Tienken Road on the north. Since 1987, it has ended at M-59.

== Route description ==
M-150 follows a single road, known locally as Rochester Road. The trunkline begins at an interchange where Rochester Road crosses the M-59 freeway at exit 46 in Rochester Hills. From there it travels north past the Hampton Golf Club and the Winchester Mall between the intersections with Auburn and Hamlin roads. Past this commercial development, the trunkline runs through residential subdivisions and near Rochester College. North of the Avon Road intersection, the highway enters Rochester and crosses the Clinton River. Rochester Road forms one of the main streets of the downtown area in Rochester as it passes through the city. North of Romeo Street, the road exits downtown and passes through another residential neighborhood. The highway crosses back into Rochester Hills before it terminates at the intersection with Tienken Road near another commercial development; Rochester Road continues northward as a locally maintained roadway.

Like other state highways in Michigan, M-150 is maintained by the Michigan Department of Transportation (MDOT). In 2011, the department's traffic surveys showed that on average, 41,675 vehicles used the highway daily between M-59 and Auburn Road and 27,320 vehicles did so each day in Rochester, the highest and lowest counts along the highway, respectively. The section of M-150 between M-59 and Auburn Road is listed on the National Highway System, a network of roads important to the country's economy, defense, and mobility.

== History ==
M-150 has always existed along Rochester Road in Oakland County since it was commissioned around the end of 1930 or in early 1931 At that time, the road ran from a junction with M-59 in, what is today, Rochester Hills, north to the northern limit of Rochester. Since then, the road has been extended and shortened a number of times. By the middle of 1936, a 14-mile (23 km) extension to the south extended the highway along Rochester Road and Stephenson Highway through Royal Oak to end at M-102 (8 Mile Road), and northward to Romeo Road in northern Oakland County.

In 1963, the section south of 11 Mile Road near Royal Oak was removed from M-150; sections were rebuilt as part of I-75 and the rest was turned over to local control. The northern extension from the 1930s was removed in 1965 when the trunkline was shortened to end on the north side of Rochester at Tienken Road. The southern section was later truncated back to the current southern terminus at M-59 in 1987. This southern segment between I-75 and M-59 is listed on the National Highway System however.

== Major intersections ==
The entire highway is in Oakland County.

| Location | mi | km | Destinations | Notes |
|---|---|---|---|---|
| Rochester Hills | 0.00 | 0.00 | M-59; Rochester Road | Exit 46 on M-59; roadway continues south as Rochester Road |
| Rochester | 4.767 | 7.672 | Tienken Road; Rochester Road | Roadway continues north as Rochester Road |
1.000 mi = 1.609 km; 1.000 km = 0.621 mi
