= St. John's–St. Luke's Evangelical Church =

Historic church in Michigan, United States

- U.S. National Register of Historic Places
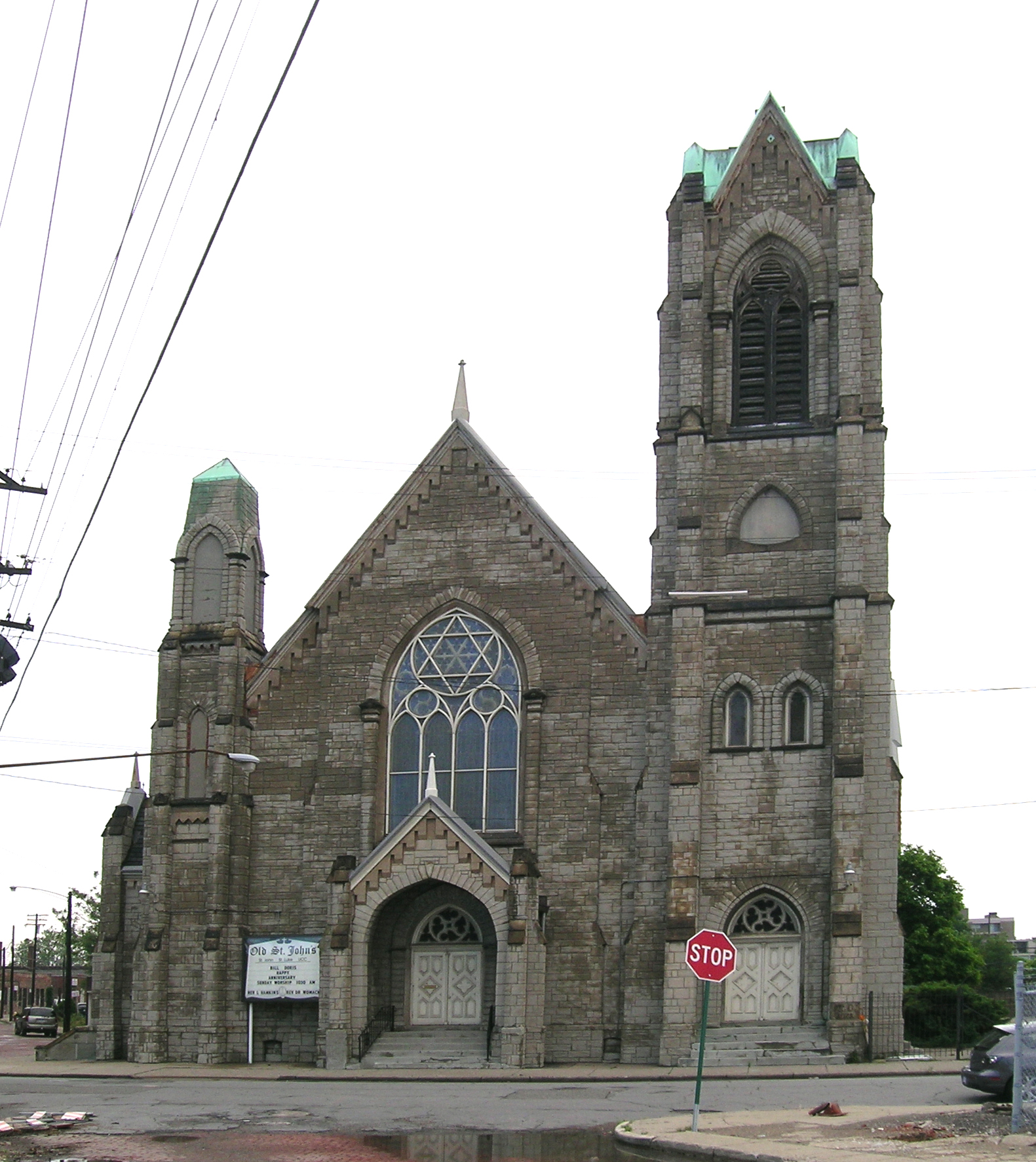
- Interactive map
- Location: 2120 Russell Street; Detroit, Michigan
- Coordinates: 42°20′36″N 83°2′17″W
- Built: 1872
- Architect: Julius Hess et al.
- Architectural style: Late Victorian, Gothic Revival, Romanesque Revival
- NRHP reference No.: 82002907
- Added to NRHP: April 22, 1982

St. John's–St. Luke's Evangelical Church is a congregation of the United Church of Christ located at 2120 Russell Street in Detroit, Michigan. It was listed on the National Register of Historic Places in 1982.

== History ==
St. John's is the oldest German Protestant church in Detroit, founded in 1833 by Rev. Friedrich Schmid, who had been sent to America by the Evangelical Mission Society of Basel, Switzerland. The first worship service took place August 18, 1833 in the carpenter shop of John Hais. Pastor Schmid served the congregation until July 1836. German was the language used exclusively in the worship service until 1938. St. John's was the base from which twelve other German Protestant churches in the city were formed. St. Luke Evangelical church was organized in 1891. St. John's and St. Luke's merged in 1969.

== Architecture ==
The church was originally constructed in 1874, and was designed by architect Julius Hess. The façade features a large tower on one side and a smaller tower on the other, flanking the entranceway. A large lancet window dominates the façade and a gabled vestibule fronts the gabled entrance. The exterior has been extensively altered from its original appearance. The structure of the church is brick, but in 1915 the exterior was completely covered in Formstone, a cast concrete made to resemble limestone.

The interior of the church is High Victorian Gothic in design, painted white and gold with elaborate Gothic woodwork. The lighting system is historically significant, and the church features a Votteler organ.
