= Michigan's 17th Senate district =

American legislative district

Michigan's 17th State Senate district
Senator
Jonathan Lindsey; R–Coldwater
- Demographics: 83.5% White; 4% Black; 6.3% Hispanic; 0.9% Asian; 0.2% Native American; 0.6% Other; 4.4% Multiracial
- Population (2024): 270,347

Michigan's 17th Senate district is one of 38 districts in the Michigan Senate. The 17th district was created by the 1850 Michigan Constitution, as the 1835 constitution only permitted a maximum of eight senate districts. It has been represented by Republican Jonathan Lindsey since 2023, succeeding fellow Republican Dale Zorn.

== Geography ==
District 17 encompasses all of Branch, Cass, and St. Joseph counties, as well as parts of Berrien, Calhoun, Hillsdale, and Jackson counties.

=== 2011 Apportionment Plan ===
District 17, as dictated by the 2011 Apportionment Plan, covered Lenawee and Monroe Counties on the outskirts of Detroit and Toledo, including the communities of Monroe, Adrian, Tecumseh, Carleton, Dundee, Hudson, Morenci, Blissfield, Clinton, Bedford Township, Monroe Township, Frenchtown Township, Berlin Township, Madison Township, and part of Milan.

The district was located entirely within Michigan's 7th congressional district, and overlapped with the 17th, 56th, 57th, and 65th districts of the Michigan House of Representatives. It bordered the state of Ohio, and shared a water border with Canada via Lake Erie.

== List of senators ==
Senator	Party	Dates	Residence	Notes
Edward S. Moore	Democratic	1853–1854	Three Rivers	
Charles Upson	Republican	1855–1856	Centreville	
Alonzo Garwood	Republican	1857–1858	Cassopolis	
George Meacham	Republican	1859–1860	Union	
Gilman C. Jones	Republican	1861–1862	Dowagiac	
Emmons Buell	Republican	1863–1864	Cass County	
Levi Aldrich	Republican	1865–1866	Edwardsburg	
William B. Williams	Republican	1867–1870	Allegan	
Francis B. Stockbridge	Republican	1871–1872	Saugatuck	
Adam Beattie	Republican	1873–1874	Ovid	
George M. Huntington	Democratic	1875–1876	Mason	
Lorison J. Taylor	Republican	1877–1878	Laingsburg	
Horace Halbert	Republican	1879–1880	Fowlerville	
William M. Kilpatrick	Republican	1881–1882	Owosso	
Justin R. Whiting	Greenback	1883–1884	St. Clair	Also backed by the Democrats.
William M. Cline	Democratic	1885–1886	Port Huron	Elected on a fusion ticket in 1884, backed by both the Democrats and the Greenback Party.
Edwin G. Fox	Republican	1887–1890	Mayville	
John Bastone	Patrons (Note: The Patrons of Industry were a farming organization founded in Port Huron, Michigan which, by 1890, had begun participating in political action independent of other political parties at the state level.)	1891	Caro	Also endorsed by the Democrats. Resigned.
Edmund M. Barnard	Republican	1893–1898	Grand Rapids	
Robert D. Graham	Republican	1899–1900	Grand Rapids	
Augustus W. Weekes	Republican	1901–1904	Lowell	
Huntley Russell	Republican	1905–1908	Kent County	
Horace T. Barnaby Jr.	Republican	1909–1912	Grand Rapids	
Thomas H. McNaughton	Republican	1913–1914	Ada	
John Paul	Republican	1915–1916	East Grand Rapids	
Anson R. Harrington	Democratic	1917–1918	Comstock Park	
Thomas H. McNaughton	Republican	1919–1924	Ada	
James C. Quinlan	Republican	1925–1928	Grand Rapids	
James A. Skinner	Republican	1929–1932	Cedar Springs	
J. Neal Lamoreaux	Democratic	1933–1934	Comstock Park	
M. Harold Saur	Republican	1935–1936	Kent City	
J. Neal Lamoreaux	Democratic	1937–1938	Comstock Park	
M. Harold Saur	Republican	1939–1946	Kent City	
James C. Quinlan	Republican	1947–1948	Grand Rapids	Died in office.
John B. Martin Jr.	Republican	1949–1950	Grand Rapids	
Charles R. Feenstra	Republican	1951–1962	Grand Rapids	
Robert VanderLaan	Republican	1963–1964	Grand Rapids	
Carl W. O'Brien	Democratic	1965–1966	Pontiac	
L. Harvey Lodge	Republican	1967–1974	Waterford	
Kerry K. Kammer	Democratic	1975–1982	Pontiac	
Richard D. Fessler	Republican	1983–1990	Union Lake	
David M. Honigman	Republican	1991–1994	West Bloomfield	
Jim Berryman	Democratic	1995–1998	Adrian	
Beverly S. Hammerstrom	Republican	1999–2006	Temperance	
Randy Richardville	Republican	2007–2014	Monroe	
Dale Zorn	Republican	2015–2022	Ida	
Jonathan Lindsey	Republican	2023–present	Coldwater	

== Recent election results ==
=== 2020s ===
2026 Michigan Senate election
Primary election
Party	Candidate	Votes	%
Republican	Jonathan Lindsey (incumbent)	26,515	100
Total votes		26,515	100
Democratic	Ashleigh Baker	11,166	55.25
Democratic	Brett Muchow	5,174	25.6
Democratic	Mike D. Jones	3,871	19.15
Total votes		20,211	100
General election
Republican	Jonathan Lindsey (incumbent)	65,769	60.78
Democratic	Ashleigh Baker	42,432	39.22
Total votes		108,201	100
Republican hold			

2022 Michigan Senate election, District 17
Primary election
Party	Candidate	Votes	%
Republican	Jonathan Lindsey	21,717	61.4
Republican	Kim LaSata (incumbent)	13,631	38.6
Total votes		35,348	100
General election
Republican	Jonathan Lindsey	66,134	65.4
Democratic	Scott Rex Starr	35,011	34.6
Total votes		101,145	100
Republican hold			

=== 2018 ===
2018 Michigan Senate election, District 17
Party	Candidate	Votes	%
Republican	Dale Zorn (incumbent)	57,771	57.8
Democratic	Bill LaVoy	39,196	39.2
Libertarian	Chad McNamara	2,903	2.9
Total votes		99,870	100
Republican hold			

=== 2014 ===
2014 Michigan Senate election, District 17
Party	Candidate	Votes	%
Republican	Dale Zorn	38,442	51.1
Democratic	Doug Spade	34,706	46.2
Constitution	Chad McNamara	2,039	2.7
Total votes		75,187	100
Republican hold			

=== Federal and statewide results ===
Year	Office	Results
2020	President	Trump 59.9 – 38.3%
2018	Senate	James 54.8 – 43.1%
2018	Governor	Schuette 52.7 – 44.3%
2016	President	Trump 58.1 – 36.3%
2014	Senate	Land 47.9 – 47.6%
2014	Governor	Snyder 52.4 – 44.8%
2012	President	Obama 49.5 – 49.4%
2012	Senate	Stabenow 54.9 – 41.4%

== Historical district boundaries ==
Map	Description	Apportionment Plan	Notes
	Lapeer County; Oakland County (part); Addison Township; Brandon Township; Independence Township; Oakland Township; Orion Township; Oxford Township; Pontiac; Waterford Township	1964 Apportionment Plan	
	Livingston County (part); Brighton Township; Cohoctah Township; Conway Township; Deerfield Township; Genoa Township; Handy Township; Hartland Township; Oceola Township; Tyrone Township; Oakland County (part); Groveland Township; Highland Township; Holly Township; Independence Township; Keego Harbor; Pontiac; Rose Township; Springfield Township; Sylvan Lake; Waterford Township; White Lake Township	1972 Apportionment Plan	
	Oakland County (part); Brandon Township; Bloomfield Hills; Bloomfield Township; Commerce Township; Groveland Township; Highland Township; Holly Township; Independence Township; Lyon Township; Milford Township; Orchard Lake Village; Rose Township; South Lyon; Southfield Township; Springfield Township; Sylvan Lake; Walled Lake; West Bloomfield Township; White Lake Township	1982 Apportionment Plan	
	Lenawee County; Monroe County; Washtenaw County (part); Augusta Township; Milan; Saline; York Township	1992 Apportionment Plan	
	Jackson County (part); Grass Lake Township; Leoni Township; Norvell Township; Summit Township; Monroe County; Washtenaw County (part); Bridgewater Township; Lodi Township; Manchester Township; Milan (part); Pittsfield Township (part); Saline; Saline Township; York Township	2001 Apportionment Plan	
	Lenawee County; Monroe County	2011 Apportionment Plan	
