= Samaria, Michigan =

- Unincorporated community
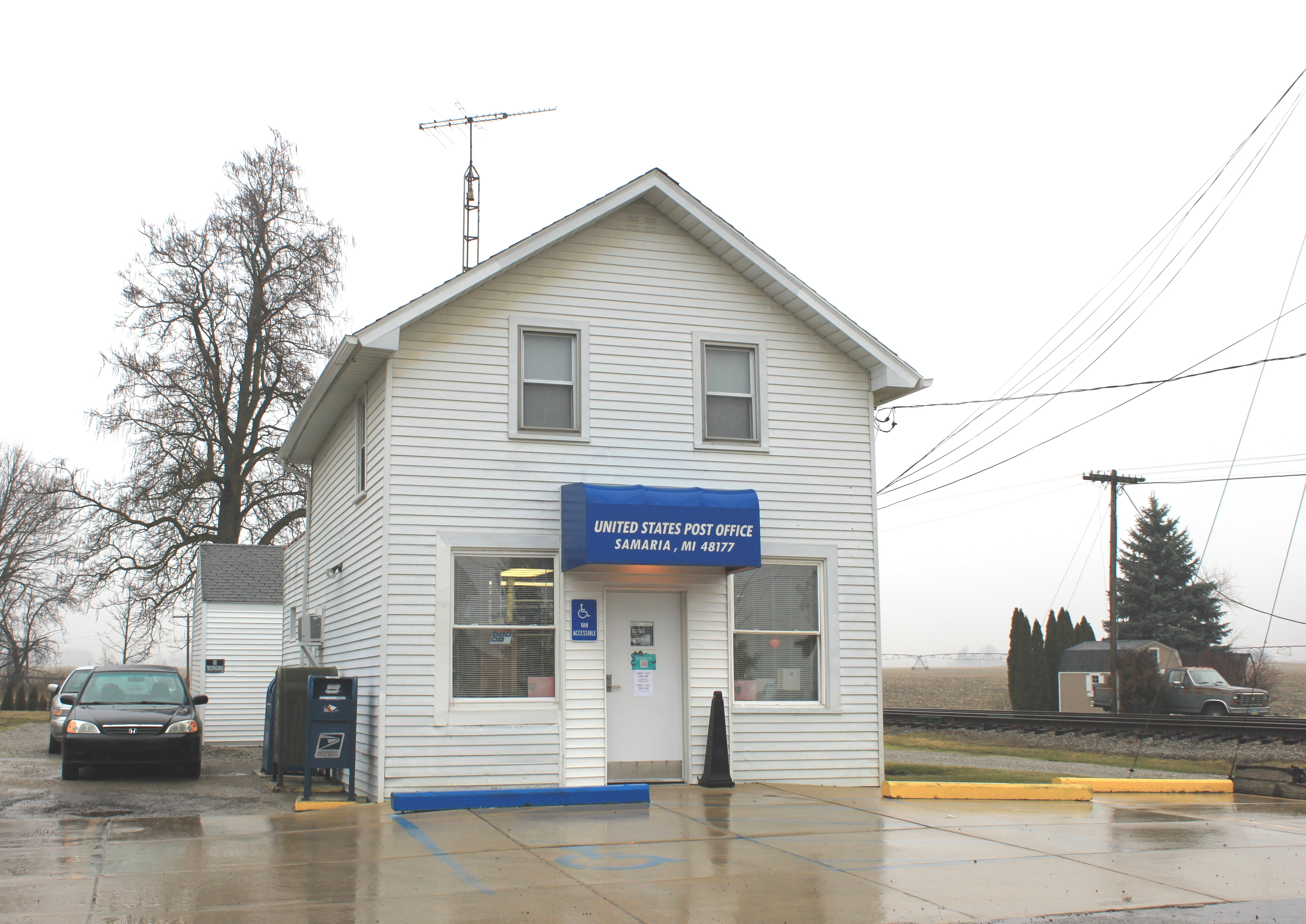
- U.S. Post Office in Samaria

- Location within the state of Michigan Location within the United States
- Coordinates: 41°48′29″N 83°34′42″W
- Country: United States
- State: Michigan
- County: Monroe
- Township: Bedford
- Settled: 1872
- Platted: 1884
- Elevation: 643 ft (196 m)
- Time zone: UTC-5 (Eastern (EST))
  - Summer (DST): UTC-4 (EDT)
- ZIP code(s): 48177; 48182 (Temperance)
- Area code: 734
- GNIS feature ID: 637149

Samaria is an unincorporated community in Monroe County in the U.S. state of Michigan. The community is located within Bedford Township. As an unincorporated community, Samaria has no legally defined boundaries or population statistics of its own but does have its own post office with the 48177 ZIP Code.

== Geography ==
Samaria sits at an elevation of 643 feet (196 m) above sea level. The community is located about 15 miles (24 km) southwest of Monroe in south-central Monroe County.

The community is centered along Samaria Road about halfway between U.S. Route 23 to the west and U.S. Route 24 (Telegraph Road) and M-125 (South Dixie Highway) to the east. M-151 ran through the center of Samaria east to U.S. Route 25 before M-151 was truncated in 1965, and both highways were soon after decommissioned altogether.

It is about 5 miles (8.0 km) north of the Ohio state border from the city of Toledo. The communities of Temperance and Lambertville are located just south of Samaria.

The community is mostly served by Bedford Public Schools, while some students in the northern portion may attend Mason Consolidated Schools.

== History ==
Bedford Township, where Samaria is located, was established on March 23, 1836 after previously being part of Erie Township since 1818. The community was previously known as Weeksville after early residents Samuel and Mary (Mason) Weeks. The Wabash Railroad built a line through the area in 1872. In May 1878, a railway station was built in Samaria. The community was officially platted in 1884.

The area received its first post office under the name Samaria on January 17, 1879 with Samuel Weeks serving as the first postmaster. The post office has remained in operation ever since, and the current office is located at 1344 Samaria Road. The post office uses the 48177 ZIP Code and is primarily used for post office box only with a very small delivery area. The majority of the surrounding area is instead served by the Temperance 48182 ZIP Code.

The single railway line continues to run through the community. It is currently operated by Ann Arbor Railroad, connecting Ann Arbor to Toledo, but the line no longer contains a station in the area.

== Images ==
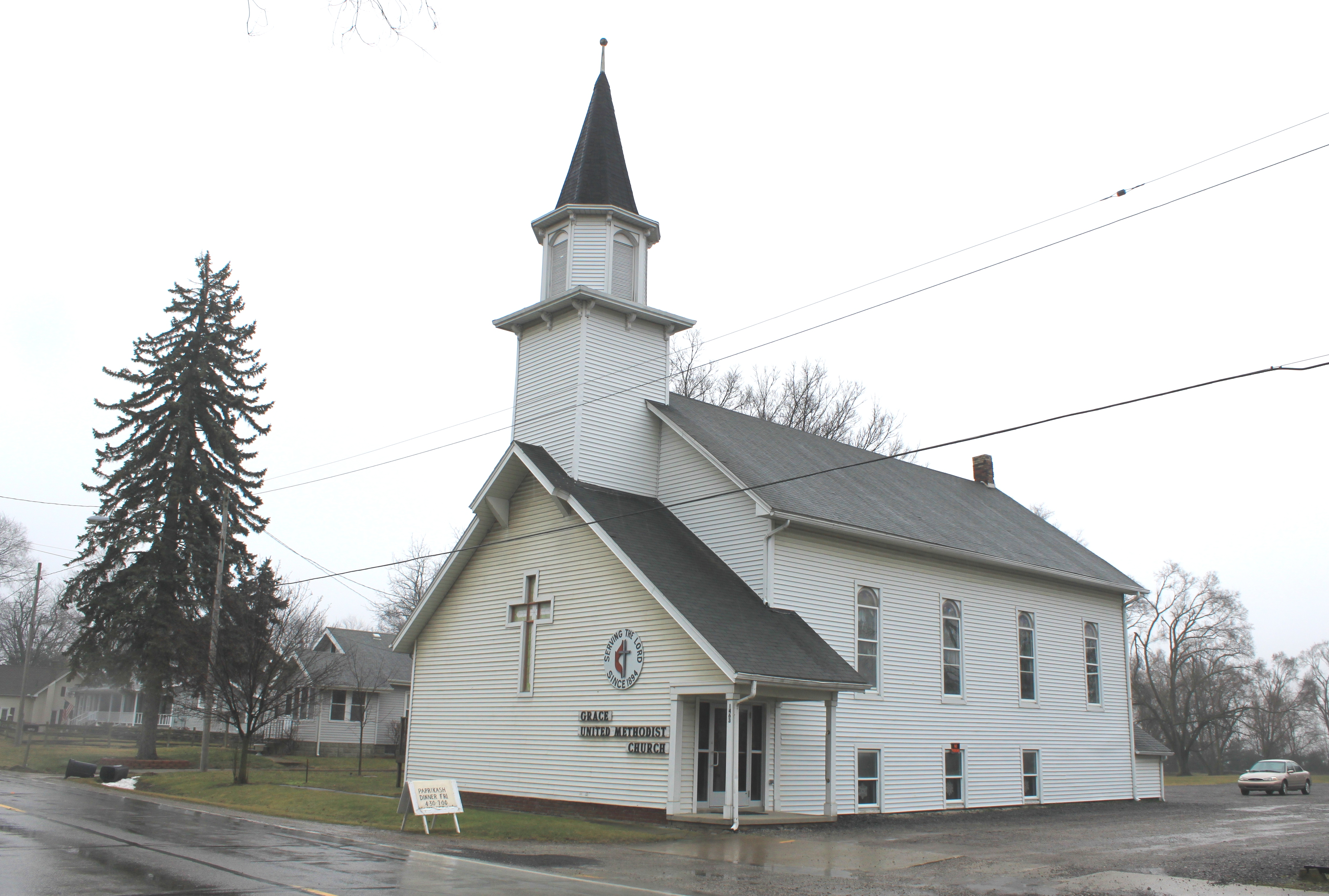
Grace United Methodist Church in Samaria, founded in 1894

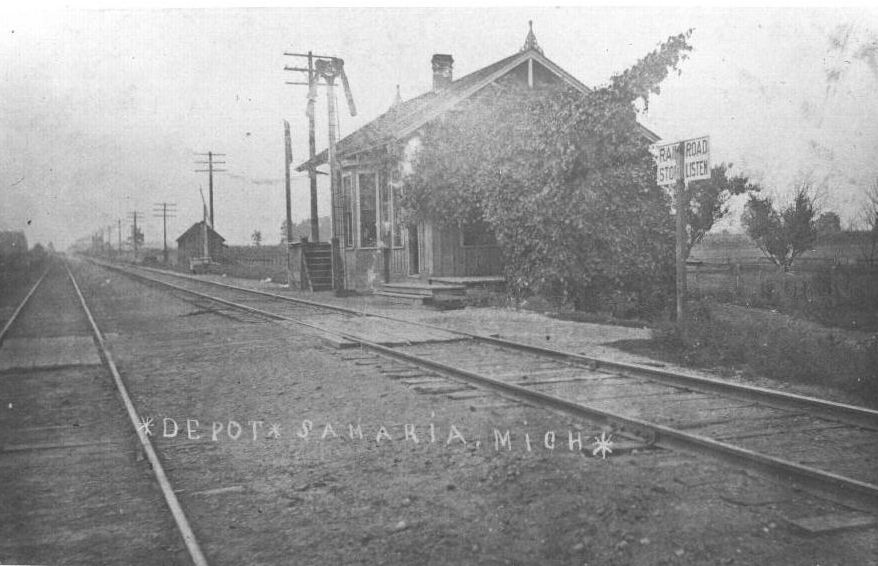
Historic image of the former Samaria Station prior to 1920
