= Michigan's 56th House of Representatives district =

American legislative district

Michigan's 56th State House of Representatives district
Representative
Sharon MacDonell; D–Troy
- Demographics: 66.3% White; 3.8% Black; 3.2% Hispanic; 22.2% Asian; 0.1% Native American; 0.1% Hawaiian/Pacific Islander; 0.4% Other; 3.9% Multiracial
- Population (2024): 87,990

Michigan's 56th House of Representatives district is a legislative district within the Michigan House of Representatives located in Oakland County. The district was created in 1965, when the Michigan Supreme Court ordered the reapportionment of state legislative districts from a county-based system to a proportional one following the Supreme Court case Reynolds v. Sims. It is currently represented by Democrat Sharon MacDonell of Troy.

== List of representatives ==
Representative	Party	Years	Residence	Notes
Claude E. Burton	Democratic	1965–1966	Bellevue	
Dale Warner	Republican	1967–1974	Eaton Rapids	
Ernest W. Nash	Republican	1975–1986	Dimondale	
Frank M. Fitzgerald	Republican	1987–1992	Grand Ledge	
Lynn F. Owen	Democratic	1993–1998	Monroe	
Randy Richardville	Republican	1999–2004	Monroe	
Herb Kehrl	Democratic	2005	Monroe	Died in office.
Kate Ebli	Democratic	2006–2010	Frenchtown Township	Lived in Monroe until around 2008.
Dale Zorn	Republican	2011–2014	Ida	
Jason Sheppard	Republican	2015–2020	Temperance	Lived in Lambertville until around 2017.
TC Clements	Republican	2021–2022	Temperance	
Sharon MacDonell	Democratic	2023–present	Troy	

== Historical district boundaries ==
Map	Description	Apportionment Plan	Notes
	Calhoun County (part): Albion; Clarence Township; Fredonia Township; Lee Township; Marengo Township; Marshall; Marshall Township; Sheridan Township; Eaton County (part): Bellevue Township; Benton Township; Brookfield Township; Carmel Township; Charlotte; Chester Township; Delta Township; Eaton Township; Eaton Rapids; Eaton Rapids Township; Hamlin Township; Kalamo Township; Lansing (part); Roxand Township; Sunfield Township; Olivet; Potterville; Vermontville Township; Walton Township; Windsor Township	1964 Apportionment Plan	
	Clinton County (part): Eagle Township; Watertown Township; Eaton County (part): Excluding; Delta Township (part); Lansing (part); Ionia County (part): Campbell Township (part); Danby Township; Odessa Township; Orange Township; Portland Township; Sebewa Township	1972 Apportionment Plan	
	Eaton County	1982 Apportionment Plan	
	Monroe County (part): Ash Township; Berlin Township; Erie Township; Frenchtown Township; La Salle Township; Luna Pier; Monroe; Monroe Township; Raisinville Township	1992 Apportionment Plan	
	Monroe County (part): Ash Township; Berlin Township; Exeter Township; Frenchtown Township; Ida Township; La Salle Township; London Township; Luna Pier; Monroe; Monroe Township; Raisinville Township	2001 Apportionment Plan	
	Monroe County (part): Bedford Township; Dundee Township; Erie Township; Ida Township; La Salle Township; Luna Pier; Milan (part); Milan Township; Petersburg; Raisinville Township; Summerfield Township; Whiteford Township	2011 Apportionment Plan	
	Oakland County (part): Birmingham (part); Bloomfield Township (part); Clawson; Royal Oak (part); Troy (part)	2021 Apportionment Plan (Note: Referred to as the Hickory plan.)	

== Recent elections ==
=== 2020s ===
2026 Michigan House of Representatives election
Party	Candidate	Votes	%
Democratic	Sharon MacDonell (incumbent)	28,625	62.96
Republican	Ashok Baddi	16,843	37.04
Total votes		45,468	100
Democratic hold			

2024 Michigan House of Representatives election
Party	Candidate	Votes	%
Democratic	Sharon MacDonell (incumbent)	29,111	57.19
Republican	Dave Kniffen	21,790	42.81
Total votes		50,901	100
Democratic hold			

2022 Michigan House of Representatives election
Party	Candidate	Votes	%
Democratic	Sharon MacDonell	24,630	57.93
Republican	Mark Gunn	17,887	42.07
Total votes		42,517	100
Democratic gain from Republican			

2020 Michigan House of Representatives election
Party	Candidate	Votes	%
Republican	TC Clements	31,325	64.2
Democratic	Keith W. Kitchens	16,478	33.77
Green	Jeffrey Jon Rubley II	993	2.04
Total votes		48,796	100
Republican hold			

=== 2010s ===
2018 Michigan House of Representatives election
Party	Candidate	Votes	%
Republican	Jason Sheppard	21,979	62.32
Democratic	Ernie Whiteside	13,289	37.68
Total votes		35,268	100
Republican hold			

2016 Michigan House of Representatives election
Party	Candidate	Votes	%
Republican	Jason Sheppard	24,509	58.35%
Democratic	Tom Redmond	16,316	38.84%
Constitution	R. Al Bain	1,179	2.81%
Total votes		42,004	100.00%
Republican hold			

2014 Michigan House of Representatives election
Party	Candidate	Votes	%
Republican	Jason Sheppard	13,600	50.33
Democratic	Tom Redmond	12,726	47.09
U.S. Taxpayers'	Al Bain	697	2.58
Total votes		27,023	100.0
Republican hold			

2012 Michigan House of Representatives election
Party	Candidate	Votes	%
Republican	Dale Zorn	23,592	57.64
Democratic	Larry Crider	17,338	42.36
Total votes		40,930	100.0
Republican hold			

2010 Michigan House of Representatives election
Party	Candidate	Votes	%
Republican	Dale Zorn	13,592	53.36
Democratic	Kate Ebli	11,879	46.64
Total votes		25,471	100.0
Republican gain from Democratic			

2008 Michigan House of Representatives election
Party	Candidate	Votes	%
Democratic	Kate Ebli	28,495	63.07
Republican	JeanMarie Dahm	15,459	34.22
Constitution	John Eleniewski	1,224	2.71
Total votes		45,178	100.0
Democratic hold			
