= Chris Morris (American football, born 1983) =

American football player (born 1983)

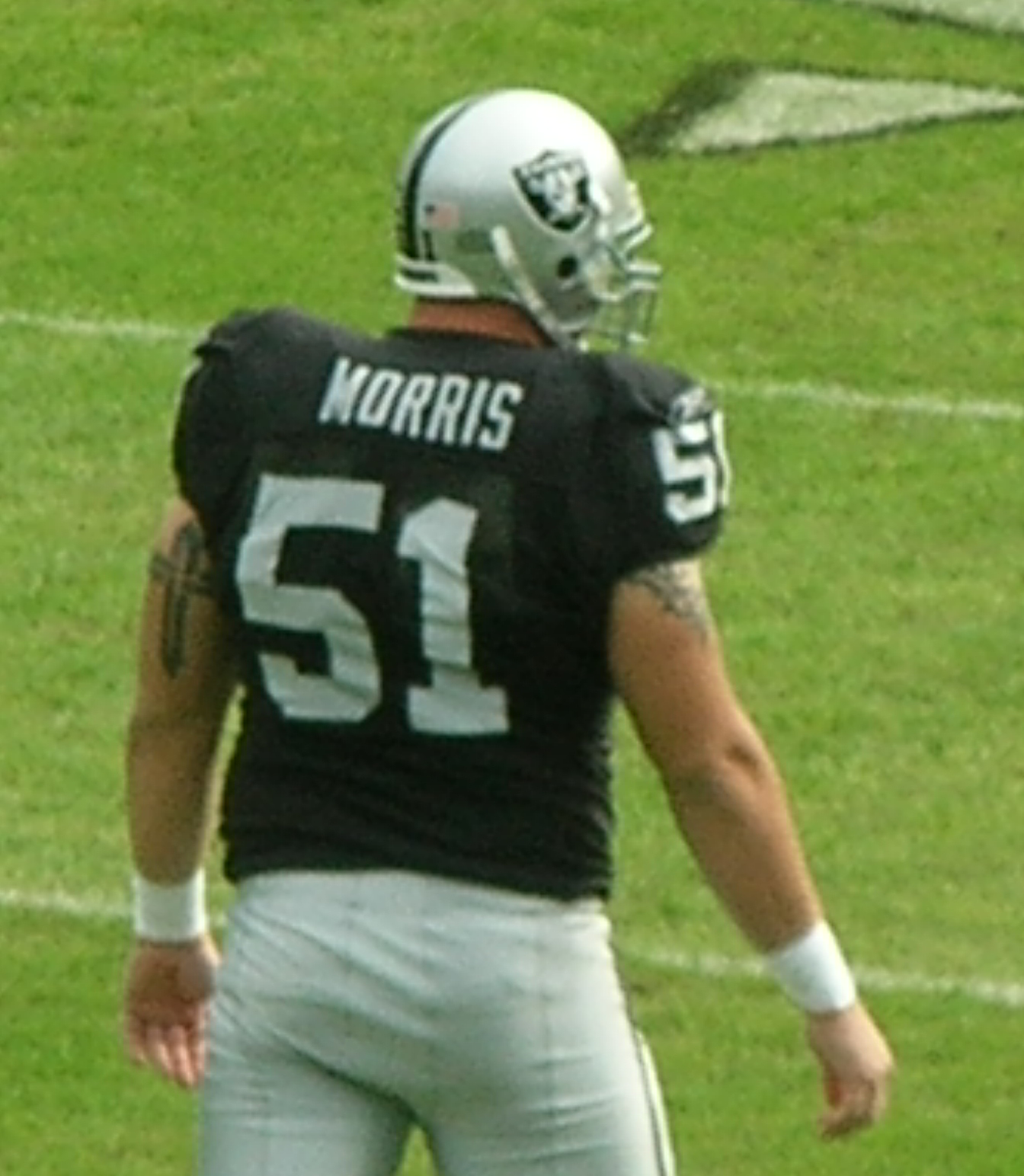

No. 61, 51, 63
- Position: Guard / Center

Personal information
- Born: February 22, 1983 (age 43); Lambertville, Michigan, U.S.
- Listed height: 6 ft 4 in (1.93 m)
- Listed weight: 305 lb (138 kg)

Career information
- High school: Bedford (Temperance, Michigan)
- College: Michigan State (2002–2005)
- NFL draft: 2006: 7th round, 214th overall pick

Career history
- Oakland Raiders (2006–2009); Carolina Panthers (2010); New England Patriots (2011)*; Detroit Lions (2011)*; Tennessee Titans (2012)*
- * Offseason or practice squad member only

Career NFL statistics
- Games played: 51
- Games started: 11
- Fumble recoveries: 1
- Stats at Pro Football Reference

Chris Morris (born February 22, 1983) is an American middle school level football guard and center. He was selected by the Oakland Raiders in the seventh round of the 2006 NFL draft. He played college football for the Michigan State Spartans.

He was also a member of the Carolina Panthers, New England Patriots, Detroit Lions Field Falcons and Tennessee Titans.

== Early life ==
Morris played high school football at Bedford High School in Temperance, Michigan.

== College career ==
In 2004, Morris was ranked among the top preseason candidates for the Rimington Trophy. He was ranked top 15 centers by The Sporting News at number 12 and College Football Preview ranked him as number 14. He had 90 percent or better in 30 of 33 career games played. He recorded 137 career pancakes.

== Professional career ==
Pre-draft measurables
Height	Weight	40-yard dash	20-yard shuttle	Three-cone drill	Vertical jump	Broad jump	Bench press
6 ft 3 1/2 in (1.92 m)	298 lb (135 kg)	5.28 s	4.50 s	7.42 s	29.0 in (0.74 m)	9 ft 5 in (2.87 m)	33 reps
All values from Pro Day

=== Oakland Raiders ===
Morris was selected in the seventh round by the Oakland Raiders with the 214th overall pick in the 2006 NFL draft. He was waived in 2009

=== New England Patriots ===
Morris signed with the New England Patriots on August 3, 2011, but was released on August 13.

=== Detroit Lions ===
On August 24, 2011, Morris signed with the Detroit Lions. He was released on September 4.

=== Tennessee Titans ===
Morris was signed by the Tennessee Titans on August 4, 2012.
