= TC Clements =

American politician (born 1969)

Member of the Michigan House of Representatives from the 56th district
- In office January 1, 2021 – December 31, 2022
- Preceded by: Jason Sheppard
- Succeeded by: Sharon MacDonell

Personal details
- Born: March 28, 1969 (age 57) Bartow, Florida
- Party: Republican
- Education: Polk State College; Flagler College
- Website: TC Clements

Thomas Gregory Clements Jr. (born March 28, 1969) is an American politician who served as a member of the Michigan House of Representatives from the 56th district. Elected in 2020, he assumed office on January 1, 2021, and left office on December 31, 2022.

== Early life and education ==
Clements was born on March 28, 1969, in Bartow, Florida. Clements earned an associate degree from Polk State College. In 2007, Clements earned a bachelor's degree from Flagler College.

== Career ==
Clements has served as deputy chief of police of Eliot, Maine. Clements is the franchise owner of the travel agency Premier Cruise Planners. As of 2020, Clements was a member trustee of Bedford Township, Michigan. On November 3, Clements was elected to the Michigan House of Representatives. He was sworn in on December 13, 2020, and assumed office on January 1, 2021. There, he represented the 56th district. In 2022, Clements was defeated by Joseph Bellino in the Republican primary for the 16th state senate district. In July 2023, Clements became the Vice President of the Monroe County Business Alliance and in January 2024 became CEO.

== Personal life ==
Clements is married to Jamie. Together, they have three children. Clements is a member of the National Rifle Association of America. Clements is Lutheran. Clements resides in Temperance.
