= WMLZ-LP =

Coordinates: 41.767°N 83.590°W

- Temperance, Michigan; United States
- Broadcast area: Bedford Township
- Frequency: 107.9 MHz

Programming
- Format: Silent

Ownership
- Owner: Bedford Public Schools

History
- First air date: March 16, 2002
- Call sign meaning: W-MuLeZ (School mascot)

Technical information
- Licensing authority: FCC
- Facility ID: 124218
- Class: L1
- ERP: 100 watts
- HAAT: 19 meters

Links
- Public license information: LMS

WMLZ-LP (107.9) is a low-power High School radio station. The station is licensed to Bedford Public Schools in Temperance, Michigan.

== History ==
WMLZ-LP first began broadcasting in 2002 under the name of Blend 107.9, where it played a mix of 1980s music and current hits. The format was then changed in 2006 to incorporate a wide time range classic rock, and the station changed its name to Z108. In February 2018, the station shifted towards a variety hits format, branded as 107.9 Memories. WMLZ-LP also aired Bedford High School's football and basketball games. In 2022, the station was taken out of service when a nearby football stadium light tower--which contained the transmitter--was replaced. The transmitter was soon reinstalled and the station began broadcasting again.
