= Jason Sheppard =

American politician (born 1978)

Member of the Michigan House of Representatives from the 56th district
- In office January 1, 2015 – January 1, 2021
- Preceded by: Dale Zorn
- Succeeded by: TC Clements

Personal details
- Born: August 25, 1978 (age 48) Toledo, Ohio
- Party: Republican
- Spouse: Melissa
- Education: Michigan State University; University of Toledo
- Occupation: Real estate agent

Jason M. Sheppard (born August 25, 1978) is an American politician from Michigan. Sheppard is a Republican member of the Michigan House of Representatives from District 56.

== Early life ==
On August 25, 1978, Sheppard was born in Toledo, Ohio.

== Education ==
Sheppard attended Michigan State University and University of Toledo.

== Career ==
Sheppard is a commercial real estate agent with Signature & Associates. Sheppard also runs a small business that he owns and founded 17 years ago.

On November 4, 2014, Sheppard won the election and became a Republican member of Michigan House of Representatives for District 56. On November 8, 2016, as an incumbent, Sheppard won the election and continued serving District 56. On November 6, 2018, as an incumbent, Sheppard won the election and continued serving District 56.

== Personal life ==
Sheppard's wife is Melissa. Sheppard lives in Temperance, Michigan. Sheppard is Baptist.

Political offices
Preceded by Dale Zorn	Michigan Representatives; 56th District; 2015–present	Succeeded by Incumbent
