= Ken Moyer =

American football player and High School Teacher (born 1966)

No. 73
- Position: Offensive lineman

Personal information
- Born: November 19, 1966 (age 59); Canoga Park, California, U.S.
- Listed height: 6 ft 7 in (2.01 m)
- Listed weight: 297 lb (135 kg)

Career information
- College: Toledo
- NFL draft: 1989: undrafted

Career history
- Cincinnati Bengals (1989–1994); Philadelphia Eagles (1995)*
- * Offseason or practice squad member only

Career NFL statistics
- Games played: 71
- Games started: 54
- Fumble recoveries: 1
- Stats at Pro Football Reference

Kenneth Wayne Moyer (born 1966) is an American former professional football player who was an offensive lineman for five seasons with the Cincinnati Bengals of the National Football League (NFL). He played college football for the Toledo Rockets.

Moyer attended Bedford High School in Temperance, Michigan and the University of Toledo, where he got a bachelor's degree in Science and Electrical Engineering. He became the head football coach at Dayton Christian High School in 2014 as well as teaching high school geometry at Bellbrook High School. Moyer coached and taught at Dayton Christian High School from 2014 to 2021, when he decided to become the football coach of Valley View High School in Germantown, Ohio.
