= Francis B. Stockbridge =

American politician (1826–1894)

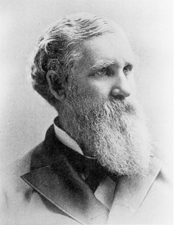

United States Senator from Michigan
- In office March 4, 1887 – April 30, 1894
- Preceded by: Omar D. Conger
- Succeeded by: John Patton, Jr.

Member of the Michigan Senate from the 17th district
- In office 1871–1872
- Preceded by: William B. Williams
- Succeeded by: Adam Beattie

Member of the Michigan House of Representatives from the Allegan County 1st district
- In office 1869–1870
- Preceded by: William Packard
- Succeeded by: Richard Ferris

Personal details
- Born: April 9, 1826 Bath, Maine, US
- Died: April 30, 1894 (aged 68) Chicago, Illinois, US
- Party: Republican

Francis Brown Stockbridge (April 9, 1826 – April 30, 1894) was a U.S. senator in the state of Michigan.

== Biography ==
Stockbridge was born in Bath, Maine, the son of a physician, Dr. John Stockbridge, and attended the common schools there. He clerked at a wholesale house in Boston from 1843 to 1847. He then moved to Chicago and opened a lumber yard. In 1851 he moved to Saugatuck, Michigan, and engaged in the operation of sawmills. He was also interested in mercantile pursuits.

In 1863 he moved to Kalamazoo and there engaged in the lumber business. That same year he married Bessie, a schoolteacher and sister of George Thomas Arnold, a lumberman and business associate there (and later at Mackinac Island). In 1869 Stockbridge became a member of the Michigan State House of Representatives from Allegan County's first district and in 1871 a member of the Michigan State Senate from the 17th district. He was appointed ambassador to the Netherlands on July 12, 1875, took the oath of office but never proceeded to the post.

In 1882, Stockbridge purchased the site of the famous Grand Hotel on Mackinac Island and arranged financing for its construction from the three major transportation companies that rendered service to the island at the time: the Michigan Central Railroad, the Grand Rapids and Indiana Railroad, and the Detroit and Cleveland Navigation Company. Together, they formed the Mackinac Island Hotel Company, which then built the Grand Hotel in 1887.

He was elected as a Republican to the United States Senate in 1887 and was reelected in 1893. He served from March 4, 1887, until his death on April 30, 1894. He was chairman of the Committee on Fisheries in the Fiftieth through Fifty-second Congresses. While visiting his nephew James Houghteling in Chicago he died soon after he was hit and injured by a Chicago cable car. Although the accident itself was not fatal, his associates attributed his death to the mental stress he endured from it. He and his wife are interred in Mountain Home Cemetery in Kalamazoo, Michigan.

Stockbridge was the last person to have served in the Michigan State Legislature and in the United States Senate until Debbie Stabenow was elected in 2000.

== See also ==
- List of members of the United States Congress who died in office (1790–1899)

U.S. Senate
Preceded by Omar D. Conger	U.S. senator (Class 1) from Michigan; 1887–1894; Served alongside: Thomas W. Palmer, James McMillan	Succeeded by John Patton, Jr.
