= Senator Lamoureux =

Senator Lamoureux (or Lamoreaux or Lamoreux) may refer to:

- Clarence A. Lamoreux (1860–1945), Wisconsin State Senate
- J. Neal Lamoreaux (1889–1954), Michigan State Senate
- Michael Lamoureux (born 1976), Arizona State Senate
