= Kate Ebli =

American politician

Member of the Michigan House of Representatives from the 56th district
- In office November 14, 2006 – January 1, 2011
- Preceded by: Herb Kehrl
- Succeeded by: Dale Zorn

Personal details
- Party: Democratic

Kathleen M. "Kate" Ebli (October 15, 1958 – January 2, 2011) was a Michigan state representative from the 56th district, serving from 2006 until 2010. She was a Democrat, Catholic, and member of the National Rifle Association of America.

== Education and experience ==
Ebli received her bachelor's degree in General Agriculture from Pennsylvania State University and her MBA from Oakland University in Michigan. She had a history as a local community advocate; as a businesswoman she worked for both Maclean Hunter and Comcast Cable Communications. Ebli served on the board for the River Raisin Center for the Arts, the Monroe Humane Society, and the Monroe YMCA. She belonged to the Veterans of Foreign Wars Ladies Auxiliary Post 1138 and St. Michael the Archangel Catholic Church.

== Personal life ==
She lived on a small farm in Frenchtown Township, Michigan, with her husband Nick, a retired United States Marine and Vietnam War veteran, and her daughter Victoria.

== Electoral history ==
2008 Michigan State House Election for the 56th District

Kate Ebli (D) (inc.) 28,495 63%
JeanMarie Dahm (R) 15,459 34%
John Eleniewski (United States Taxpayers) 1,224 3%

2006 Michigan State House Election for the 56th District

Kate Ebli (D) 18,346 54%
John Manor (R) 15,930 45%
