= Dale Zorn =

American politician

Member of the Michigan House of Representatives from the 34th district
- In office January 1, 2023 – December 31, 2024
- Preceded by: Cynthia Neeley (redistricting)
- Succeeded by: Nancy Jenkins-Arno

Member of the Michigan Senate from the 17th district
- In office January 1, 2015 – January 1, 2023
- Preceded by: Randy Richardville
- Succeeded by: Jonathan Lindsey (redistricting)

Member of the Michigan House of Representatives from the 56th district
- In office January 1, 2011 – January 1, 2015
- Preceded by: Kate Ebli
- Succeeded by: Jason Sheppard

Member of the Monroe County Board of Commissioners
- In office 1991–2010

Personal details
- Born: December 31, 1953 (age 72)
- Party: Republican
- Spouse: Cindy
- Website: Michigan State Senator Dale W. Zorn

Dale W. Zorn (born December 31, 1953) is a retired American career politician. He was a member of the Michigan Senate for the 17th district and in the Michigan House of Representatives first from the 56th District and after his time in the Michigan Senate from the 34th district. Prior to his first stint in the Michigan House of Representatives he served 20 years on the Monroe County Board of Commissioners (including 4 years as chairman from 1996 to 2000), 6 years as a Raisinville Township trustee, and 4 years as a township constable. He is a member of the Republican Party.

Zorn's family is the owner of an automotive business, Zorn's Service Inc. Zorn belongs to several community organizations; including Fraternal Order of Police Lodge 113, and Monroe County Vietnam Veterans Chapter 142 (although he never served in Vietnam or the military).

== Political career ==
Due to term limits, Senator Zorn was ineligible for re-election to the Michigan Senate in 2022. He then moved from Ida Monroe County, Michigan to Lenawee County, Michigan and ran for and won a term in the Michigan House of Representatives there. Since he served two previous terms in the Michigan House of Representatives, he was term limited in 2024. He was succeeded in the state House by Nancy Jenkins.

In 2022, Zorn co-sponsored Michigan Senate Bill 885, directing $1.4 billion for the purpose of improving Michigan’s food security and investing in rural communities.

=== Controversy ===
April 25, 2020, Zorn apologized for wearing a protective face mask on the Michigan Senate floor depicting a design similar to the battle flag of the Confederate States of America, a deeply divisive image offensive to many Americans as a symbol of racism and slavery. It occurred during votes limiting emergency powers of Michigan Governor Gretchen Whitmer. The previous week, protests at the Michigan Capitol had featured Confederate flags and swastikas.

Zorn had denied that it depicted a Confederate flag to local television station WLNS, saying he believed the mask was meant to depict the state flag of either Tennessee or Kentucky although the mask had no resemblance to either flag. Zorn also stated “... [E]ven if it was a Confederate flag, you know, we should be talking about teaching our national history in schools and that’s part of our national history and it’s something we can’t just throw away because it is part of our history." Zorn further explained, "And if we want to make sure that the atrocities that happened during that time doesn’t happen again, we should be teaching it. Our kids should know what that flag stands for.” Asked by a WLNS reporter what the flag stands for, Zorn replied, "The Confederacy."

Michigan was a Union state. Zorn's constituency in Lenawee and Monroe counties was historically active in the Underground Railroad. State Senator Jeff Irwin said the Confederate flag should never be worn, "especially by an elected official. It dishonors our fellow Michiganders. It dishonors the battle flags in our rotunda. It dishonors our state." The Confederate battle flag can signal support for white supremacy. Garlin Gilchrist, Michigan’s first black lieutenant governor and the first black person to preside over the Michigan state senate, called Zorn’s choice of mask “appalling and disgusting”.
