= Randy Richardville =

American politician

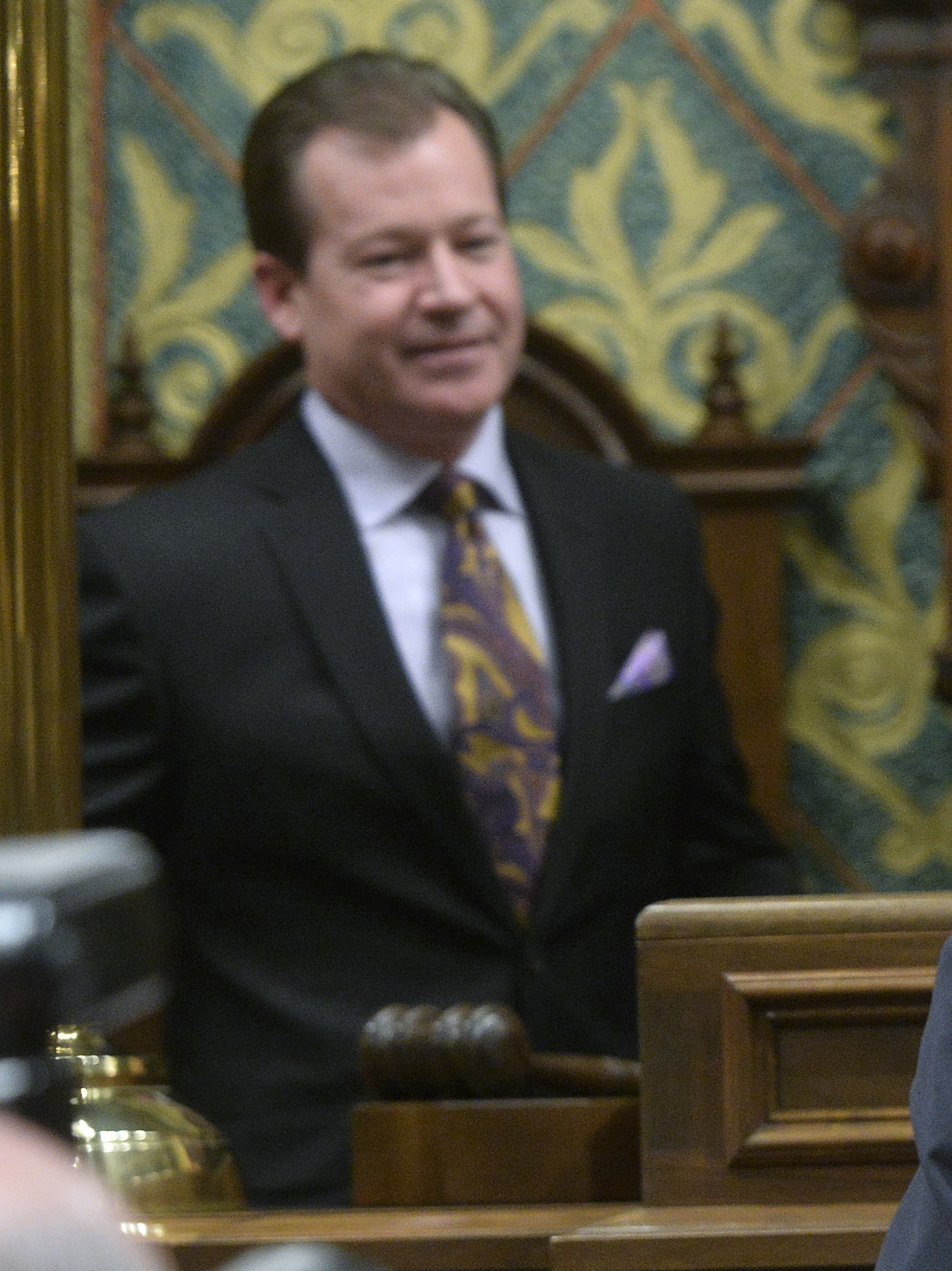

14th Majority Leader of the Michigan Senate
- In office January 1, 2011 – January 1, 2015
- Preceded by: Mike Bishop
- Succeeded by: Arlan Meekhof

Member of the Michigan Senate from the 17th district
- In office January 1, 2007 – January 1, 2015
- Preceded by: Beverly Hammerstrom
- Succeeded by: Dale Zorn

Member of the Michigan House of Representatives from the 56th district
- In office January 1, 1999 – January 1, 2004
- Preceded by: Lynn Owen
- Succeeded by: Herb Kehrl

Personal details
- Born: August 15, 1959 (age 67) Monroe, Michigan, U.S.
- Party: Republican
- Education: Albion College; Aquinas College, Michigan

Randall "Randy" Richardville (born August 15, 1959) is a Michigan Republican, who served as Majority Leader of the Michigan State Senate until his tenure ended January 1, 2015 due to term limits. He was state senator for the 17th district, which consists of all of Monroe, southern Washtenaw, and eastern Jackson counties, having taken office on January 1, 2007. He previously served in the Michigan House of Representatives for the 56th District from 1998 to 2004. This district covered the area of northeast Monroe County, Michigan.

== Biography ==
Richardville was born in Monroe, Michigan, where he graduated from Monroe Catholic Central High School— known today as St. Mary Catholic Central— in 1977. He received his Bachelor of Arts degree in Economics and Management, from Albion College in 1981, and he received his master's degree in management from Aquinas College in 1989.

Richardville has worked for several Fortune 500 and Fortune 1000 companies, including La-Z-Boy, Herman Miller, and North Star Steel.

His career also includes working for WTWR-FM radio station, United Way of America, the Monroe Chamber of Commerce, the American Legislative Exchange Council (ALEC), Habitat for Humanity, the Monroe YMCA, Monroe the Rotary Club and is a former board member for the Karmanos Cancer Institution. He is a member of the National Rifle Association and Ducks Unlimited, as well as a former member of the Board of Trustees for Monroe Public Schools and the Economic Development Director in southeast Michigan. In 2021 Randy left his Catholic faith and joined a non denominational church in Monroe. He was also hired to be the church executive director.

== Political career ==
He was elected to the Michigan House of Representatives in 1998 and served three two-year terms. As soon as he entered into office, he introduced a bill to decrease the state income tax rate, and this bill was signed into law in 1999. He soon became the Assistant Whip of the House. In his second term, he was elevated to Assistant Majority Floor Leader. In his final term, he became the Majority Floor Leader, which is the second highest-ranking member of the House, consisting of 110 representatives from throughout the state. He could not seek re-election for state representative for a fourth term in 2004, as Michigan limits its state representatives to three terms.

He ran for state senator for the 17th District of Michigan in the 2006 election. The previous district Senator, Beverly S. Hammerstrom, was ineligible for the 2006 ballot, as she had already served two full terms — the maximum number for senators. Richardville's main focus throughout his senatorial campaign, as it has been throughout his political career, was increasing jobs and the economy, health care and benefits for senior citizens, and education. On August 8, he won the district's primary election for the Republican Party nomination, defeating Milan mayor Owen Diaz. In the general election, he defeated Democrat Bob Shockman. Upon winning the election, he vowed to uphold his campaign promises to address the state's growing economic crisis. Richardville was reelected November 2, 2010 in which he will serve his 2nd and final term as State Senator, and Senate Majority Leader (due to term limits). His term as senator lasted from January 1, 2007 to December 31, 2014.

Year	Election	Defeated	Election results
1998	House	Larry Rufledge (D)	51.55–48.45%
2000	House	Herb Kehrl (D)	50.42–47.52%
2002	House	Joshua Sacks (D)	65.84–34.16%
2006	Senate	Bob Shockman (D)	55.33–44.67%
2010	Senate	John Spencer (D)	61.8–39.2%

== See also ==
- List of Michigan state legislatures
