= John Patton Jr. =

American politician

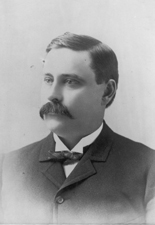

United States Senator from Michigan
- In office May 5, 1894 – January 14, 1895
- Appointed by: John T. Rich
- Preceded by: Francis B. Stockbridge
- Succeeded by: Julius C. Burrows

Personal details
- Born: October 30, 1850 Curwensville, Pennsylvania, U.S.
- Died: May 24, 1907 (aged 56) Grand Rapids, Michigan, U.S.
- Party: Republican
- Spouse: Frances Foster
- Parent(s): John Patton; Catherine (Ennis) Patton
- Education: Columbia University Law School; Yale University; Phillips Academy
- Profession: Lawyer, Banker

John Patton Jr. (October 30, 1850 – May 24, 1907) was a U.S. senator from the state of Michigan.

Patton, the son of John Patton and the brother of Charles Emory Patton, was born in Curwensville, Pennsylvania. He prepared for college at Phillips Academy in Andover, Massachusetts, and graduated from Yale College, where he served on the third editorial board of The Yale Record and was a member of Skull and Bones in 1875.

After graduating from the law department of Columbia College, New York City, in 1877, he moved to Grand Rapids, Michigan, in 1878, was admitted to the bar the same year and commenced the practice of law.

He was appointed by the Governor of Michigan John T. Rich as a Republican to the United States Senate to fill the vacancy caused by the death of Francis B. Stockbridge and served from May 5, 1894, to January 14, 1895, when a successor was elected and qualified. He was an unsuccessful candidate for election in 1895 to fill the vacancy, losing to Julius Caesar Burrows.

He was then a banker and a member and later president of the Board of Library Commissioners of Grand Rapids.

He died in Grand Rapids and is interred there in Oakhill Cemetery.

== Sources ==
- United States Congress. "John Patton Jr. (id: P000141)". Biographical Directory of the United States Congress.

U.S. Senate
Preceded by Francis B. Stockbridge	U.S. senator (Class 1) from Michigan; 1894–1895; Served alongside: James McMillan	Succeeded by Julius C. Burrows
