= Senator Lodge =

Senator Lodge may refer to:

== Members of the United States Senate ==
- Henry Cabot Lodge Jr. (1902–1985), U.S. Senator from Massachusetts
- Henry Cabot Lodge (1850–1924), U.S. Senator from Massachusetts

== United States state senate members ==
- L. Harvey Lodge (1902–1976), Michigan State Senate
- Patti Anne Lodge (born 1942), Idaho State Senate
