= Jonathan Lindsey =

American politician

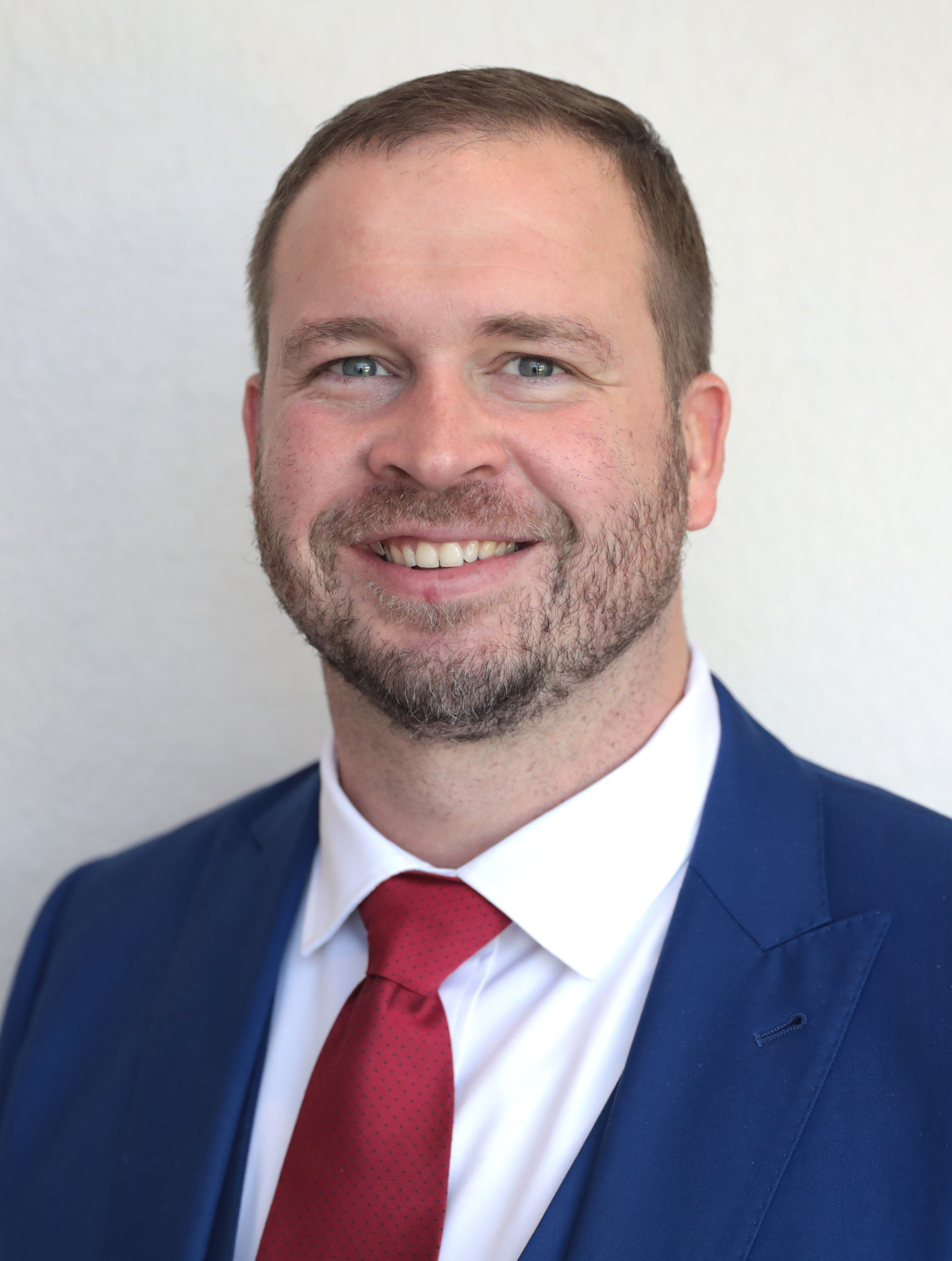

Member of the Michigan Senate from the 17th district
- Incumbent
- Assumed office January 1, 2023
- Preceded by: Dale Zorn (redistricted)

Personal details
- Born: December 18, 1984 (age 41) Sturgis, Michigan, U.S.
- Party: Republican
- Relatives: Arthur Laffer (father-in-law)
- Education: Yale University (BA)

Jonathan Lindsey is an American politician who currently represents Michigan's 17th Senate district in the Michigan Senate. He was elected in the 2022 Michigan Senate election. He is a member of the Republican Party.

== Biography ==
Lindsey grew up in rural Branch County. He graduated from Bronson High School and went on to attend Yale University, where he earned a Bachelor of Arts degree in political science. He then enlisted in the U.S. Army. Lindsey is married to Allison Laffer, daughter of economist Art Laffer. They have three children together.

== Michigan Senate ==
Lindsey ran for 17th in the 2022 Michigan Senate election as a Republican. He won the primary against Kim LaSata with 61.4% of the vote and the general election against Democrat Scott Starr with 65.4% of the vote.

== Electoral history ==
2022 Michigan's 17th Senate district Republican primary election
Party	Candidate	Votes	%
Republican	Jonathan Lindsey	21,717	61.44%
Republican	Kim LaSata	13,631	38.56%
Total votes		35,348	100%

2022 Michigan's 17th Senate district election
Party	Candidate	Votes	%
Republican	Jonathan Lindsey	64,815	65.34%
Democratic	Scott Rex Starr	34,379	34.66%
Total votes		99,194	100%
Republican hold			
