= Herb Kehrl =

American politician

Member of the Michigan House of Representatives from the 56th district
- In office January 1, 2005 – November 29, 2005
- Preceded by: Randy Richardville
- Succeeded by: Kate Ebli

Personal details
- Party: Democratic

Herb Kehrl (1941/2 - 2005) was an American politician representing Michigan's 56th district in the Michigan House of Representatives from 2004 until his death in 2005.

== Biography ==
Kehrl graduated in political science, history and sociology at Eastern Michigan University, and took a master's degree in history. He worked as a teacher of history, school principal and school administrator. In 2000 he entered the real estate industry, qualifying as a realtor in 2002. He served as chair of the Monroe County Community Mental Health Authority and as Treasurer for Habitat for Humanity, and was a member of the Frenchtown Senior Citizen Board. He was elected as a Democratic representative in the 2004 Michigan State House Election for the 56th District, winning 49% of the vote against 47% for the Republican candidate John Manor.

Kehrl died of cancer on November 30, 2005.
