= Bedford Public Schools (Michigan) =

School district in Michigan

Address
- 1135 Smith Road Temperance, Monroe County, Michigan, 48182; United States
- Coordinates: 41°45′59″N 83°35′22″W

District information
- Motto: Educating for Life!
- Grades: PreKindergarten–12
- Superintendent: Dr. Carl Shultz
- Schools: 6
- Budget: $58,082,000 2022–2023 expenditures
- NCES District ID: 2604470

Students and staff
- Students: 3,894 (2024–2025)
- Teachers: 222.4 (on an FTE basis) (2024–2025)
- Staff: 505.49 FTE (2024–2025)
- Student–teacher ratio: 17.51 (2024–2025)
- District mascot: Kicking mules
- Colors: Red & Grey

Other information
- Website: www.bedford.k12.mi.us

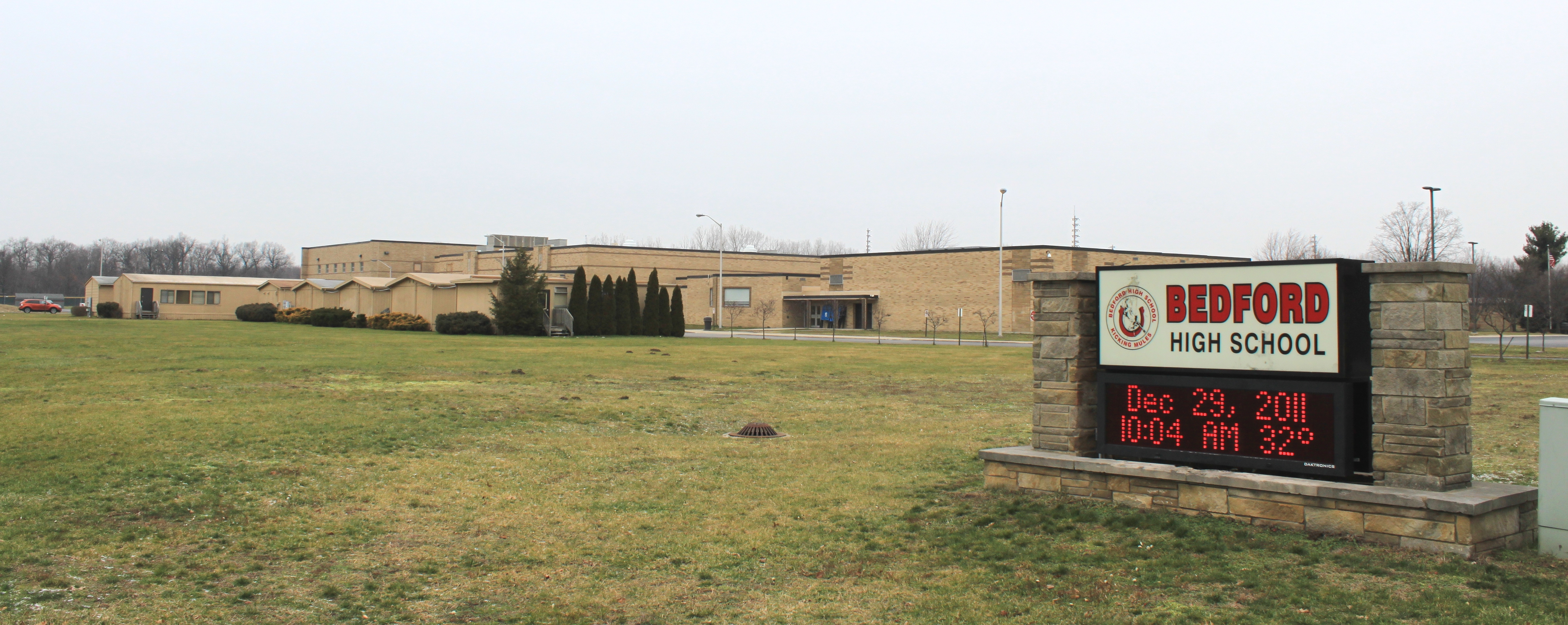
Bedford High School

Bedford Public Schools is a public school district in Monroe County, Michigan. It serves Temperance, Lambertville, and parts of the townships of Bedford, Erie, and Whiteford.

== History ==
Central School replaced Temperance's original log schoolhouse, the town's first school. Construction of the building began in 1902, and it was expanded several times, with the final addition completed in 1938. It housed the four-year Temperance High School as of 1922. Temperance High and Lambertville High, then in separate districts, both graduated their first classes in 1923. The site of Central School later became home to Temperance Road Elementary.

On February 4, 1946, Central School (then known as Temperance School) burned down. The high school students shared Lambertville High School with the Lambertville students on a split-day basis. The districts consolidated that summer. Bedford High School was built in 1951 and opened in 1953. It was located at 8486 Douglas Road.

The new district grew rapidly. In describing the need for a larger high school in 1961, then-superintendent Charles Scheltema said that in 1953, there were 2,053 students, but by 1961 there were 4,414. Douglas Road Elementary had opened in 1959, and Jackman Road Elementary would open later in 1961, but a new high school was needed to contain the increasing enrollment.

By September 1962, plans for the high school were proposed, designed by Lima, Ohio architectural firm McLaughlin and Keil and similar to their design for Sylvania Northview High School. Voters approved a bond issue to build the school in May 1963, and it opened in fall 1965. It received full-page coverage in the Monroe Evening News, which reported, "The new structure—with its gleaming halls and classrooms and modern, sturdy appearance—is alive with the exuberance, enthusiasm and inquisitiveness of youth." The previous high school became a junior high school.

The junior high became Bedford Intermediate School, a school for grades six and seven, when the current junior high building opened in fall 1971. Originally, the new junior high housed grades eight and nine. While it was under construction, the district had so many junior high students that they were divided into two groups, one of which attended in the mornings and the other in the afternoons.

Voters passed bond issues in 1998 (which funded construction of Monroe Road Elementary) and 2018 to improve district facilities.

== Schools ==
Schools in Bedford Public Schools
School	Address	Notes
Bedford High School	8285 Jackman Road, Temperance	Grades 9–12. Built 1965.
Bedford Junior High School	8405 Jackman Road, Temperance	Grades 6–8. Built 1971.
Douglas Road Elementary	6875 Douglas Road, Lambertville	Grades K–5. Built 1959.
Jackman Road Elementary	8008 Jackman Road, Temperance	Grades PreK–5. Built 1961.
Monroe Road Elementary	7979 Monroe Road, Lambertville	Grades PreK–5. Built 2001.
Bedford Virtual Academy		Online learning

== Notable alumni ==
- Chris Morris, National Football League
- Ken Moyer, National Football League
- Steve Yeager, politician and attorney
- Dennis Kinney, Major League Baseball
- Jason Hotch, Total Nonstop Action Wrestling Wrestler
- Joey Wiemer, Major League Baseball
