= Harry Bidwell Ansted =

American educator

1st President of Seoul National University
- In office 1946 – October 24, 1947
- Preceded by: Position created
- Succeeded by: Lee Choon-ho

Personal details
- Born: December 17, 1893 Temperance, Michigan, U.S.
- Died: November 15, 1955 (aged 61) Seattle, Washington, U.S.
- Education: Hillsdale College (BBA); University of Southern California (MA)

Military service
- Branch/service: United States Army
- Battles/wars: World War II

Harry Bidwell Ansted (December 17, 1893 – November 15, 1955) was a United States Army officer, pastor and educator, and the first president of Seoul National University.

== Early life and education ==
Born in Temperance, Michigan, Ansted attended Hillsdale College and earned a Bachelor of Business Administration from Greenville College. In 1923, he earned a Master of Arts degree from the University of Southern California.

== Career ==
He then became a Christian pastor and served in several churches in Michigan for five years. He went on to teach in Wessington Springs College, Los Angeles Pacific College, and Seattle Pacific College.

In 1944, near the end of the World War II, Ansted enlisted in the United States Army as an Army chaplain. After his service in Leyte, Philippines, he was transferred to Korea, a part of the United States Army Military Government in Korea. It was here, in 1946, that he became the first president of Seoul National University, a new national university established in place of Keijō Imperial University. He also created the official motto of the school, Veritas Lux Mea. Ansted was succeeded by Lee Choon-ho on October 24, 1947.

He was a member of the American Economic Association, the American History Society, and the Royal Economics Society.
