= Sharon MacDonell =

American politician (born 1962)

Member of the Michigan House of Representatives from the 56th district
- Incumbent
- Assumed office January 1, 2023
- Preceded by: TC Clements

Personal details
- Born: April 9, 1962 (age 64) Bethpage, New York
- Party: Democratic
- Education: University of Michigan, Ann Arbor (BA)
- Website: https://housedems.com/sharon-macdonell/

Sharon MacDonell (born April 9, 1962) is an American journalist and politician serving as a member of the Michigan House of Representatives since 2023, representing the 56th district. She is a member of the Democratic Party.

== Early life and education ==
MacDonell was in Bethpage, New York. MacDonell grew up in Michigan and graduated from the University of Michigan with a Bachelor of Arts in history. MacDonell then worked for several automotive and broadcasting firms as a journalist, marketing professional, and video producer.

== Political career ==
MacDonell successfully ran in 2022 as a Democrat for the Michigan House of Representatives 56th district, defeating the Republican candidate Mark Gunn. In 2024, MacDonell successfully ran for reelection, defeating the Republican candidate Dave Kniffen. In 2026, MacDonell successfully ran for a third term, defeating Republican candidate Ashok Baddi.

=== Committee assignments ===
==== 2023-2024 ====
- Energy, Communications and Technology
- Families, Children and Seniors
- Higher Education
- Transportation, Mobility and Infrastructure (Majority Vice Chair)
- Health Policy subcommittee on Behavioral Health

==== 2025-2026 ====
- Oversight
- Oversight subcommittee on Public Health and Food Security (Minority Vice Chair)
- Oversight subcommittee on the Child Welfare System

== Electoral history ==
2022 Michigan's 56th House of Representatives district Democratic primary results
Party	Candidate	Votes	%
Democratic	Sharon MacDonell	6,902	58.88%
Democratic	Cyndi Peltonen	4,821	41.12%
Total votes		11,723	100.0

2022 Michigan's 56th House of Representatives district general election
Party	Candidate	Votes	%
Democratic	Sharon MacDonell	24,630	57.93%
Republican	Mark Gunn	17,887	42.07%
Total votes		42,517	100.0

2024 Michigan's 56th House of Representatives district general election
Party	Candidate	Votes	%
Democratic	Sharon MacDonell (incumbent)	29,111	57.19%
Republican	Dave Kniffen	21,790	42.81%
Total votes		50,901	100.0

2026 Michigan's 56th House of Representatives district general election
Party	Candidate	Votes	%
Democratic	Sharon MacDonell (incumbent)	28,625	63.01%
Republican	Ashok Baddi	16,843	36.99%
Total votes		45,468	100.0
