= Joey Wiemer =

American baseball player (born 1999)

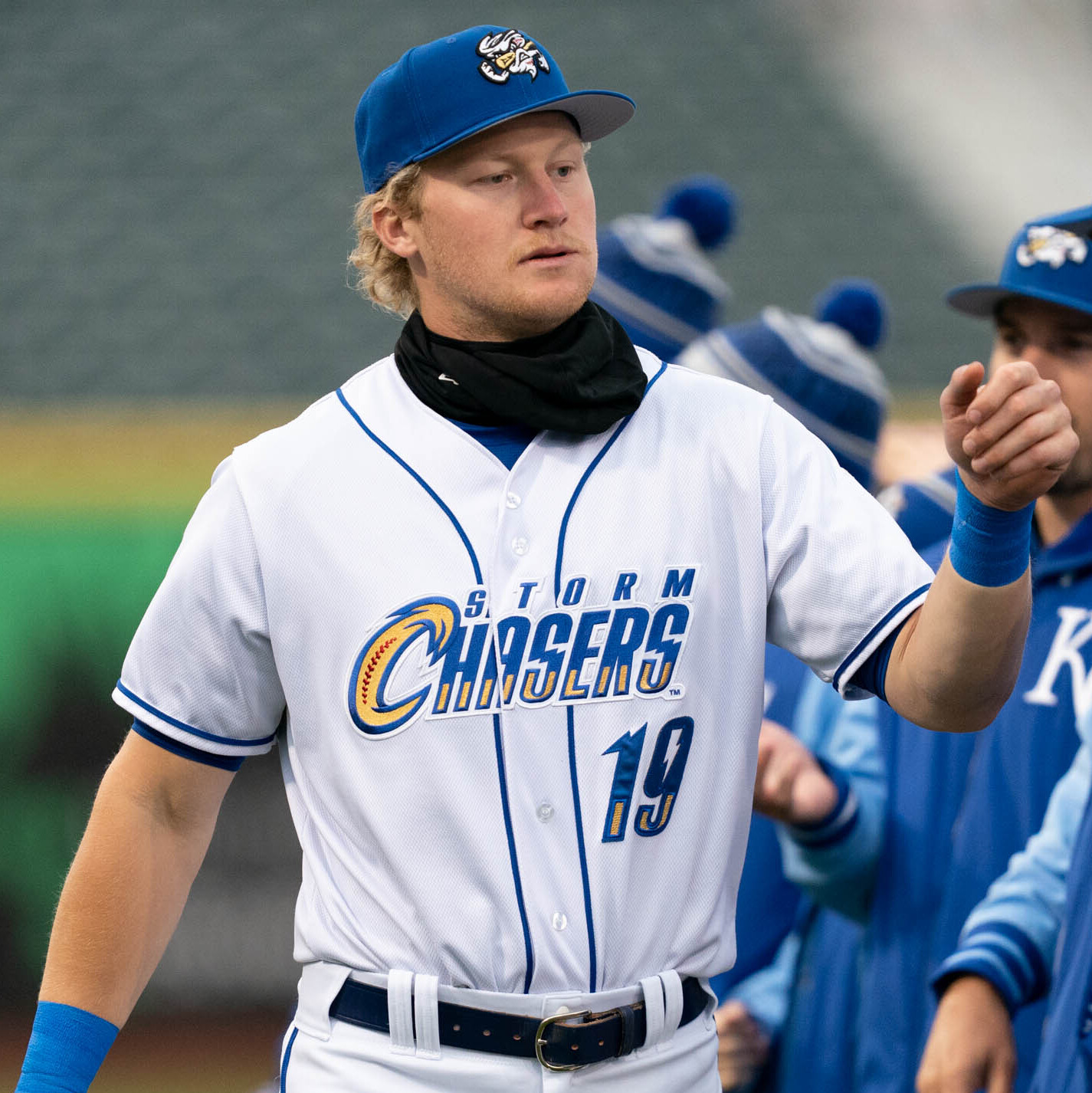
- Wiemer with the Omaha Storm Chasers in 2025

Free agent
- Outfielder
- Born: February 11, 1999 (age 27); Sylvania, Ohio, U.S.
- Bats: Right Throws: Right

MLB debut
- April 1, 2023, for the Milwaukee Brewers

MLB statistics (through 2026 season)
- Batting average: .216
- Home runs: 19
- Runs batted in: 66
- Stats at Baseball Reference

Teams
- Milwaukee Brewers (2023–2024); Cincinnati Reds (2024); Miami Marlins (2025); Washington Nationals (2026)

Joseph Daryl Wiemer (/ˈwiːmər/ WEE-mer; born February 11, 1999) is an American professional baseball outfielder who is a free agent. He has previously played in Major League Baseball (MLB) for the Milwaukee Brewers, Cincinnati Reds, Miami Marlins, and Washington Nationals. Wiemer played college baseball for the Cincinnati Bearcats and was selected by the Brewers in the fourth round of the 2020 MLB draft. He made his MLB debut in 2023 with the Brewers.

== Career ==
=== Amateur career ===
Wiemer attended Bedford Senior High School in Temperance, Michigan. He enrolled at the University of Cincinnati and played college baseball for the Cincinnati Bearcats. In 2019, he played collegiate summer baseball with the Harwich Mariners of the Cape Cod Baseball League and was named a league all-star.

=== Milwaukee Brewers ===
The Milwaukee Brewers selected Wiemer in the fourth round of the 2020 Major League Baseball draft. He did not appear for the organization in 2020 due to the cancellation of the minor league season because of the COVID-19 pandemic. Wiemer made his professional debut in 2021 with the Single-A Carolina Mudcats before being promoted to the High-A Wisconsin Timber Rattlers. Over 109 games between the two teams, he slashed .295/.403/.556 with 27 home runs, 77 runs batted in, and 30 stolen bases. In 2022, Wiemer played in 127 games split between the Double-A Biloxi Shuckers and Triple-A Nashville Sounds. In 484 at-bats, he hit .256/.336/.465 with 21 home runs, 77 runs batted in, and 31 stolen bases in 34 attempts.

After initially missing out on the Opening Day roster, on March 30, 2023, the Brewers announced Wiemer was promoted to the major leagues. On April 1, Wiemer hit a double in his major league debut against the Chicago Cubs at Wrigley Field on the first pitch he saw. On April 5, Wiemer hit his first major league home run in a win over the New York Mets at American Family Field. On May 13, Wiemer delivered a walk-off sacrifice fly in a win over the Kansas City Royals. On June 6, he recorded his first career walk-off hit, a single against the Baltimore Orioles. In 132 games during his rookie campaign, Wiemer batted .204/.283/.362 with 13 home runs, 42 RBI, and 11 stolen bases.

Wiemer was optioned to Triple-A Nashville to begin the 2024 season. In 19 games for Milwaukee, Wiemer slashed .154/.185/.154 with one stolen base and one walk.

=== Cincinnati Reds ===
On July 30, 2024, the Brewers traded Wiemer, Jakob Junis, and cash to the Cincinnati Reds for pitcher Frankie Montas. Wiemer played in two Reds games, walking in his only plate appearance.

=== Kansas City Royals ===
On November 22, 2024, the Reds traded Wiemer and Jonathan India to the Kansas City Royals for pitcher Brady Singer. Wiemer was optioned to the Triple-A Omaha Storm Chasers to begin the 2025 season. He made 72 appearances for Omaha, batting .182/.291/.312 with nine home runs, 38 RBI, and 12 stolen bases.

=== Miami Marlins ===
On August 4, 2025, Wiemer was claimed off waivers by the Miami Marlins. On August 16, the Marlins recalled Wiemer after Kyle Stowers was placed on the injured list. In 27 appearances for Miami, he batted .236/.279/.436 with three home runs and 12 RBI. Wiemer was designated for assignment by the Marlins on November 18.

=== Washington Nationals ===
On November 21, 2025, Wiemer was traded to the San Francisco Giants in exchange for cash considerations. He was designated for assignment by San Francisco on December 17. On January 5, 2026, Wiemer was claimed off waivers by the Washington Nationals. In his first three games with the Nationals Wiemer tied the MLB record for the most consecutive plate appearances (10) reaching safely to start a season. He is only the second player in 106 years to achieve this feat, sharing the record with Carlos Delgado from 2002. The streak ended on a groundout on his 11th plate appearance in a game against the Philadelphia Phillies on March 30. His streak consisted of two home runs, one triple, five singles, and two walks. Wiemer made 32 appearances for the Nationals, batting .286/.398/.514 with three home runs, 12 RBI, and one stolen base. On August 5, Wiemer was released by Washington.

=== Chicago White Sox ===
On August 7, 2026, Wiemer signed a minor league contract with the Chicago White Sox. In 22 games with Triple-A Charlotte Knights he batted .231/.241/.372 with 3 home runs, 9 RBIs and 4 stolen bases. He elected free agency on November 2.
