= Adam Beattie =

American politician and soldier

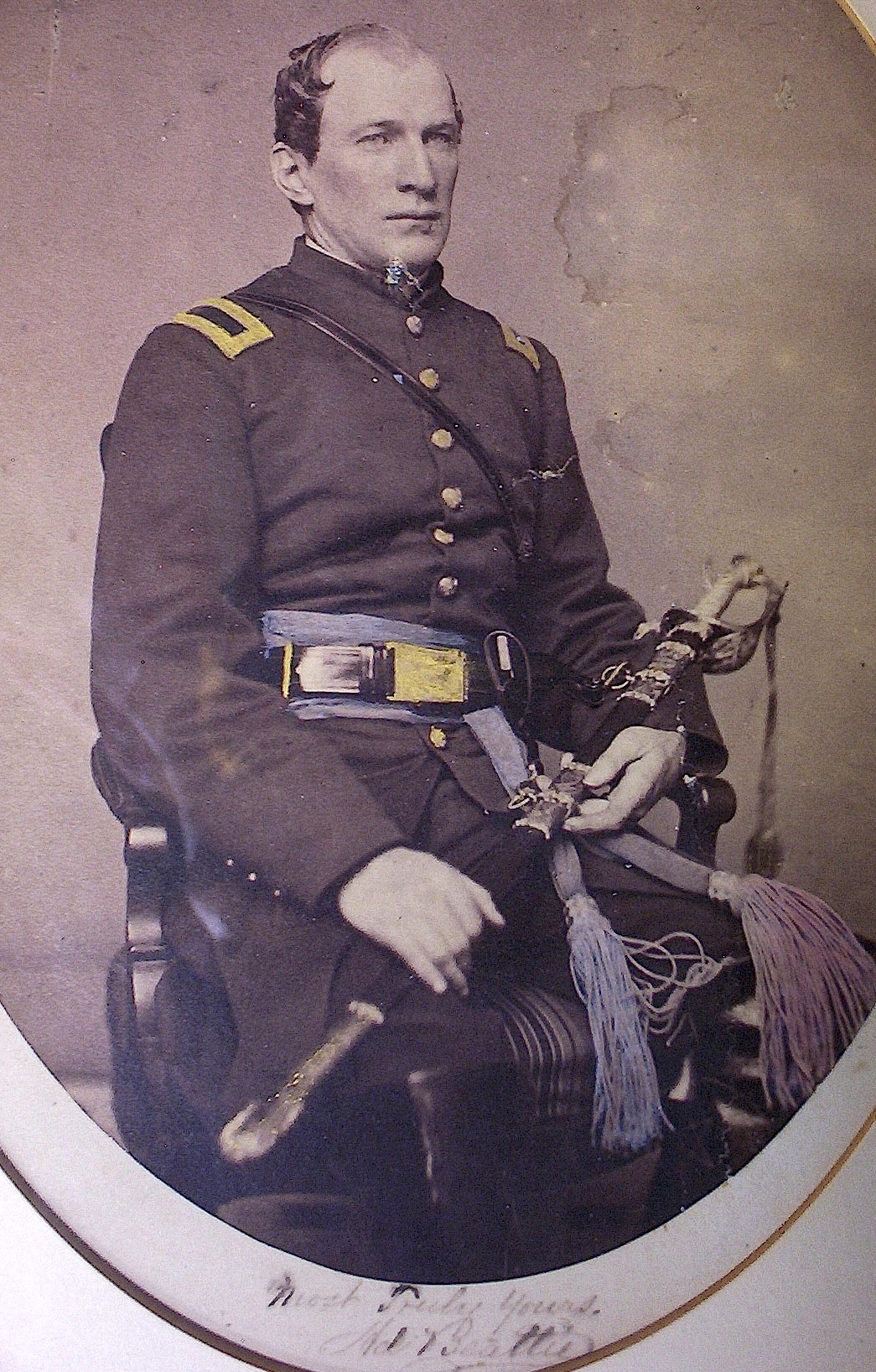
- Adam Beattie
- Born: November 26, 1833; Seneca, New York, US
- Died: June 26, 1893 (aged 59)
- Burial place: Maple Grove Cemetery, Ovid, Michigan
- Spouse: Isabella Mcfortine
- Children: Willard Grant Beattie
- Relatives: David Beattie and Dorothy Turnbull
- Military career
- Rank: Captain
- Unit: New York 26th Independent Battery
- Conflicts: American Civil War
- Memorials: Large granite monument

Adam Beattie (1833–1893) was an American politician who served in the Michigan Senate as a Republican, representing District 17. During the American Civil War he was the Captain of the New York 26th Independent Battery, Light Artillery Barnes’ Rifle Battery.

== Biography ==
Beattie was born in Seneca, New York, on November 26, 1833, to David Beattie and Dorothy Turnbull. He was the third out of four boys in the family. His father was a farmer who owned land in Seneca.

On November 28, 1862, Beattie was mustered at the age of 29 into the New York 26th Independent Battery (Light Artillery) as a 2nd Lieutenant. His position was quartermaster, in charge of acquiring goods for the unit, from horses to food. The 26th New York battery took part in the Red River Campaign.

He was promoted to Vice First Lieutenant, then Captain of the Battery, by George W. Fox on March 29, 1863. He was honorably discharged on September 12, 1865, and mustered out at New Orleans.

Beattie entered politics and became a Michigan state senator in the 17th district from 1873 to 1874. He declined the renomination after one term.

== Personal life ==
Beattie was married three times, the first to Isabella McFortine. This union bore a son, Willard Grant Beattie, in 1863. During the time Beattie was at war, Isabella died or became incapacitated and Willard went to live with Adam's brother William.

Beattie moved from Seneca, to Ovid, Michigan, in 1865 as an early pioneer in that community. His son Willard was left in New York in the care of his brother. Beattie married a second time to Katherine A. Hand, and had a second son, Mark Brewer Beattie, who was born in 1877 in Ovid. Katherine Hand died two years later in 1879. Beattie married a third time to Mary E. Hand, Katherine Hand's sister, who moved into the household to take care of Mark when he was two years old.

In Ovid, Beattie used his past knowledge as a farmer and quartermaster to become a grocer. He also ran for school board, and later became Ovid's Postmaster.

Adam Beattie died at age 59 on June 26, 1893. Adam Beattie, Mary E. Hand, and Katherine A. Hand are all buried in Ovid, Michigan's Maple Grove Cemetery. These early pioneers some of the first settlers to the area to die, and their tombstones are near the front entrance of Maple Grove Cemetery. Adam Beattie shares a large granite monument with his second wife Kate, and third wife Mary E. Hand is buried nearby in an unmarked grave.

== References and sources ==
- Seneca New York Census Records - 1850, 1855, 1860, 1865, 1870
- Ovid Michigan Census Records - 1870
- National Archive Letters from the NY 26th Light Artilliery
- Clinton County Michigan Marriage Records
- www.michiganmarkers.com = Village of Ovid / First Congregational Church
- Ovid Michigan On Site Historical Marker
- Phisterer's New York in the War of the Rebellion 1861-1865 / pages 1616-1617
