= J. Neal Lamoreaux =

American politician

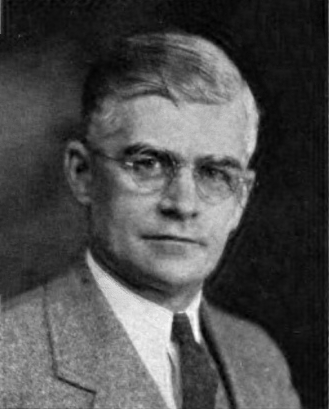

Member of the Michigan Senate from the 17th district
- In office January 1, 1933 – January 1, 1935
- Preceded by: James Abner Skinner
- Succeeded by: M. Harold Saur
- In office January 1, 1937 – January 1, 1939
- Preceded by: M. Harold Saur
- Succeeded by: M. Harold Saur

Personal details
- Born: May 3, 1889 Comstock Park, Michigan
- Died: February 6, 1954 (aged 64)
- Party: Democratic
- Spouse: Georgia Geneski
- Education: McLachlan Business College

James Neal Lamoreaux (May 3, 1889 – February 6, 1954) was an American politician from Michigan.

== Early life ==
J. Neal Lamoreaux was born on May 3, 1889, in Comstock Park, Michigan, to parents James E. Lamoreaux and Lizzie Lamoreaux. J. Neal graduated from McLachlan Business College in Grand Rapids, Michigan. J. Neal was of French ancestry.

== Career ==
Lamoreaux was involved in the dairy business. On November 8, 1932, Lamoreaux was elected to the Michigan Senate where he represented the 17th district from January 1, 1933, to January 1, 1935. Lamoreaux was defeated when he attempted re-election in 1934. On November 3, 1936, Lamoreaux was re-elected to the state senate, where he represented the same district again from January 1, 1937, to January 1, 1939. In 1938 and 1940, Lamoreaux was defeated for re-election to the state senate. In 1944, unsuccessfully ran for the United States House of Representatives representing Michigan's 5th congressional district. That same year, Lamoreaux served as a presidential elector.

== Personal life ==
On September 26, 1916, Lamoreaux married Georgia Geneski. Lamoreaux was a member of the Elks and the Maccabees. Lamoreaux was Catholic.

== Death ==
Lamoreaux died on February 6, 1954.
