= Bedford Township, Monroe County, Michigan =

Bedford Township, Michigan
- Civil township
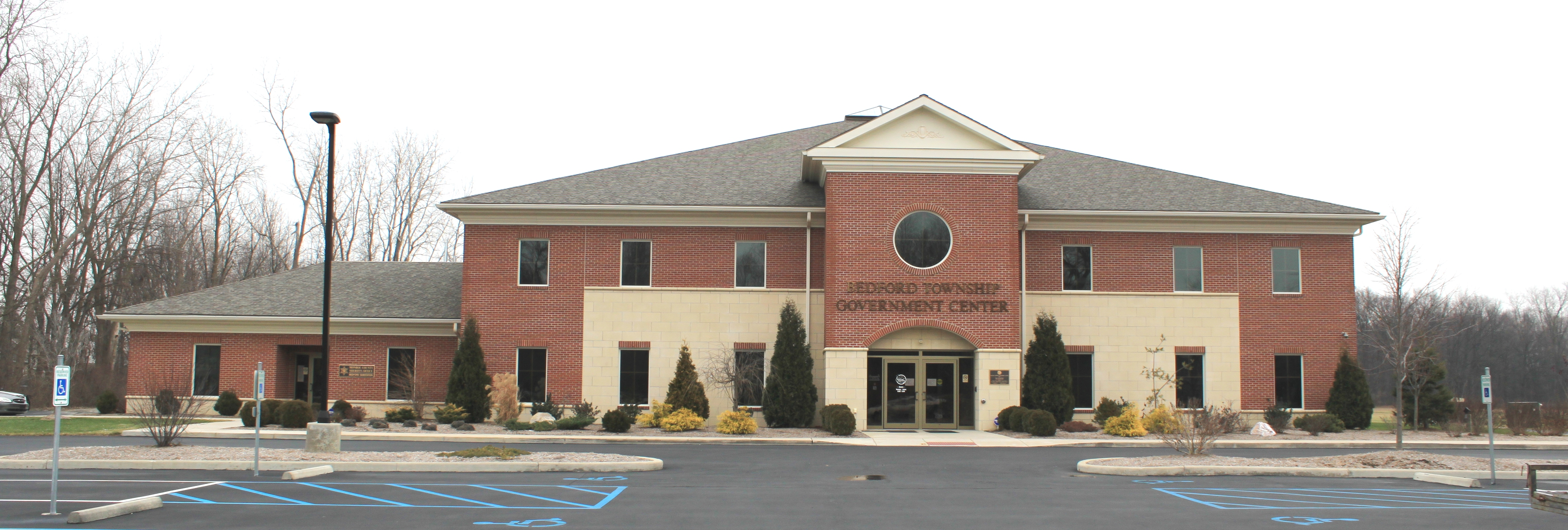
- Bedford Township Government Center

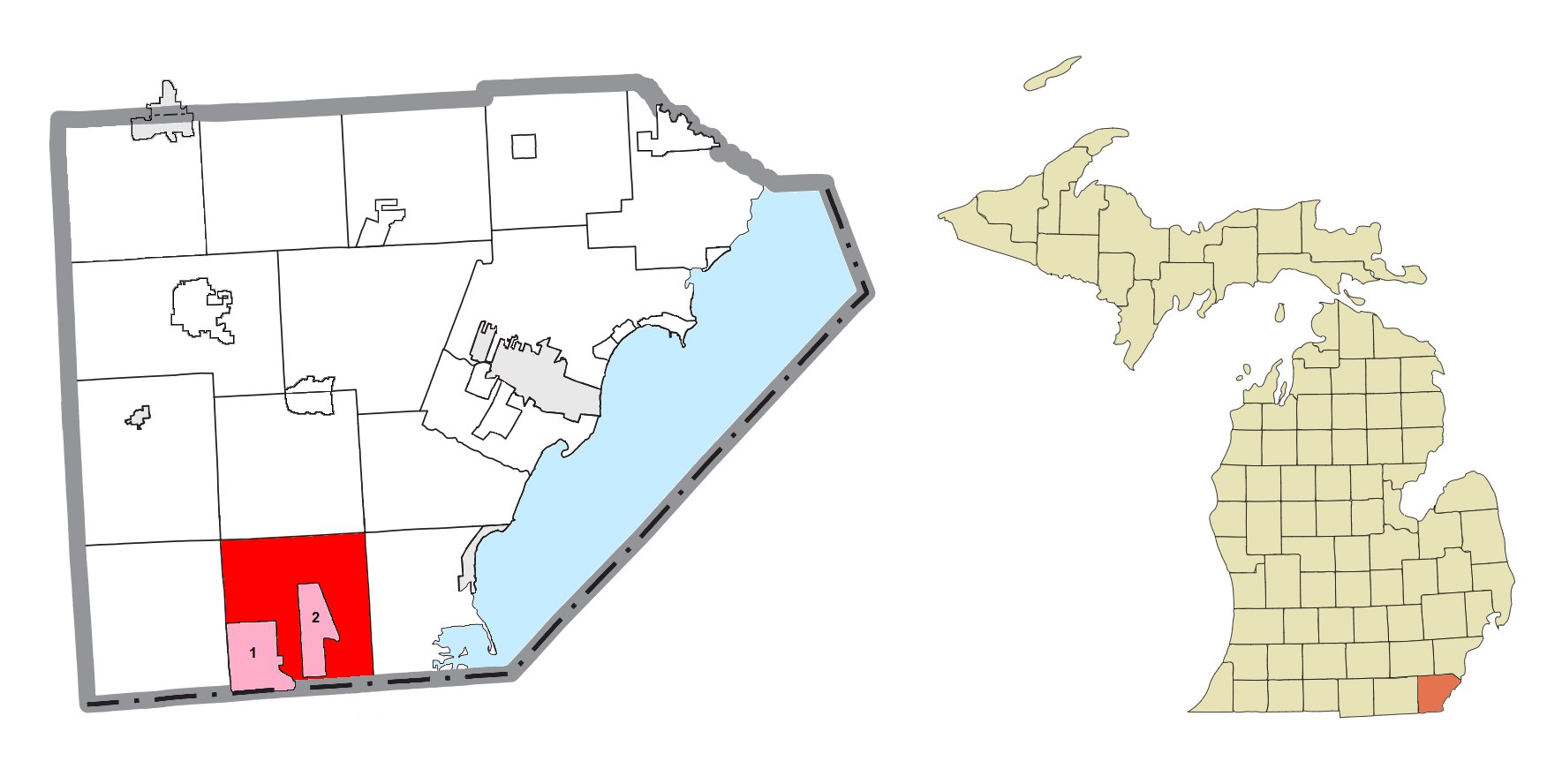
- Location within Monroe County and the administered CDPs of Lambertville (1) and Temperance (2)

- Location within Michigan Location within the United States
- Coordinates: 41°45′38″N 83°35′19″W
- Country: United States
- State: Michigan
- County: Monroe
- Organized: 1836

Government
  - Supervisor: Al Prieur
  - Clerk: Trudy Hershberger

Area
  - Total: 39.36 sq mi (101.9 km^{2})
  - Land: 39.20 sq mi (101.5 km^{2})
  - Water: 0.16 sq mi (0.41 km^{2})
- Elevation: 650 ft (198 m)

Population (2020)
  - Total: 31,813
  - Density: 811.5/sq mi (313.3/km^{2})
- Time zone: UTC-5 (Eastern (EST))
  - Summer (DST): UTC-4 (EDT)
- ZIP Codes: 48182 (Temperance); 48144 (Lambertville); 48177 (Samaria); 48133 (Erie); 49270 (Petersburg); 49267 (Ottawa Lake)
- Area code: 734
- FIPS code: 26-115-06740
- GNIS feature ID: 1625906
- Website: www.bedfordmi.org

Bedford Township is a civil township of Monroe County in the U.S. state of Michigan. As of the 2020 census, the township population was 31,813.

Bedford Township was organized in 1836. Sharing a southern border with the city of Toledo, Ohio, about 50 miles (80 km) southwest of the city of Detroit, the township is one of the southernmost areas included in the Detroit–Warren–Ann Arbor Combined Statistical Area (Metro Detroit). Bedford Township is the most populous municipality in Monroe County and the second most populous civil township in the state of Michigan after Macomb Township.

== Communities ==
- Lambertville is an unincorporated community and census-designated place in the southwest part of the township at 41°45′57″N 83°37′41″W. The Lambertville 48144 ZIP Code serves the southwest part of Bedford Township.
- Little Lake is a former community within the township. It briefly had its own post office from August 11, 1873, until December 30, 1879. William Tuttle served as the first postmaster. Tuttle's residence and post office can be seen in section 10 of an 1876 map of Bedford Township.
- Samaria is an unincorporated community in the northern part of the township at 41°48′29″N 83°34′42″W. The Samaria 48177 ZIP Code provides P.O. box service for the area.
- Temperance is an unincorporated community and census-designated place near the center of the township at 41°46′45″N 83°34′08″W. The Temperance 48182 ZIP Code serves most of Bedford Township outside of the Lambertville area.

== Geography ==
Bedford Township is located in Monroe County along the southern border of Michigan. It is bordered to the south by the city of Toledo, Ohio. According to the U.S. Census Bureau, the township has a total area of 39.36 square miles (101.94 km^{2}), of which 39.20 square miles (101.53 km^{2}) are land and 0.16 square miles (0.41 km^{2}), or 0.40%, are water. The township is drained to the southeast by several direct tributaries of Lake Erie, including, from south to north, Halfway Creek, Flat Creek, Little Lake Creek, and Bay Creek.

=== Major highways ===
- US 24 (Telegraph Road) runs briefly across the southeast part of the township.
- M-125 (S. Dixie Highway) also runs very briefly parallel to US 24 in the southeast corner of the township.
- M-151 (Samaria Road) is a former state highway that ran through the township. It is now under local control.

== Demographics ==
Historical population
Census	Pop.	Note	%±
1850	888		—
1860	1,239		39.5%
1870	1,459		17.8%
1880	1,835		25.8%
1890	1,837		0.1%
1900	2,179		18.6%
1910	2,213		1.6%
1920	2,689		21.5%
1930	4,578		70.2%
1940	5,487		19.9%
1950	7,918		44.3%
1960	14,353		81.3%
1970	20,875		45.4%
1980	22,902		9.7%
1990	23,748		3.7%
2000	28,606		20.5%
2010	31,085		8.7%
2020	31,813		2.3%
U.S. Decennial Census

As of the census of 2000, there were 28,606 people, 10,327 households, and 8,086 families residing in the township. The population density was 731.5 inhabitants per square mile (282.4/km^{2}). There were 10,659 housing units at an average density of 272.6 per square mile (105.3/km^{2}). The racial makeup of the township was 97.56% White, 0.40% African American, 0.20% Native American, 0.51% Asian, 0.01% Pacific Islander, 0.41% from other races, and 0.92% from two or more races. Hispanic or Latino of any race were 1.93% of the population.

There were 10,327 households, out of which 38.0% had children under the age of 18 living with them, 66.5% were married couples living together, 8.4% had a female householder with no husband present, and 21.7% were non-families. 18.3% of all households were made up of individuals, and 8.0% had someone living alone who was 65 years of age or older. The average household size was 2.76 and the average family size was 3.15.

In the township the population was spread out, with 28.1% under the age of 18, 6.6% from 18 to 24, 29.2% from 25 to 44, 25.3% from 45 to 64, and 10.9% who were 65 years of age or older. The median age was 38 years. For every 100 females, there were 96.3 males. For every 100 females age 18 and over, there were 94.1 males.

The median income for a household in the township was $59,835, and the median income for a family was $67,239. Males had a median income of $50,754 versus $31,165 for females. The per capita income for the township was $24,131. About 2.7% of families and 4.5% of the population were below the poverty line, including 4.8% of those under age 18 and 5.0% of those age 65 or over.

== Education ==
Bedford Township and a few surrounding areas are serviced by Bedford Public Schools, which includes Douglas Road, Jackman Road, and Monroe Road Elementary Schools, Bedford Junior High School, and Bedford Senior High School. Between 2010 and 2012, facing budget constraints and a declining enrollment, the school board decided to close Smith Road Elementary and Temperance Road Elementary. Students from both schools were absorbed into the remaining elementary schools. New Bedford Academy is a charter school serving students K-8. It is chartered by Ferris State University.

Spring Arbor University operates a location geared for adults in Lambertville, and Monroe County Community College operates a branch of its college in Bedford Township named the Whitman Center.

Previously St. Anthony School of the Roman Catholic Archdiocese of Detroit was in Temperance. Its service area included Bedford Township.

== Media ==
Bedford Township contains two local newspapers: Bedford Now and the Bedford Press. In addition, the nearby Toledo Blade daily newspaper covers Bedford Township and the surrounding community. Radio stations within the township include WMLZ-LP and WMLZ-LP.

== Notable people ==
- Mat Kerekes, singer and songwriter, born and grew up in Bedford Township
