= Lambertville, Michigan =

- Census-designated place (CDP) & unincorporated community
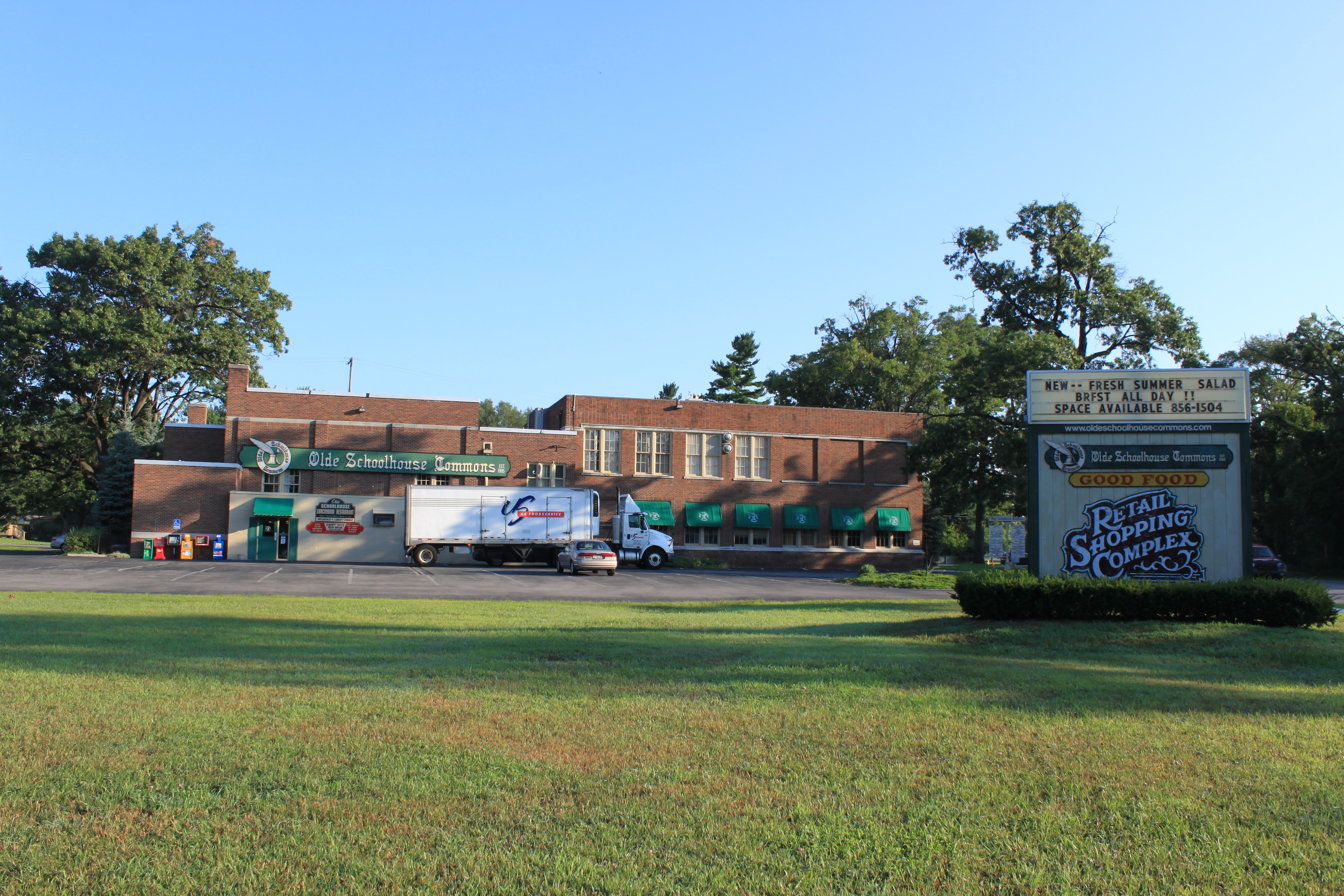
- Olde Schoolhouse Commons

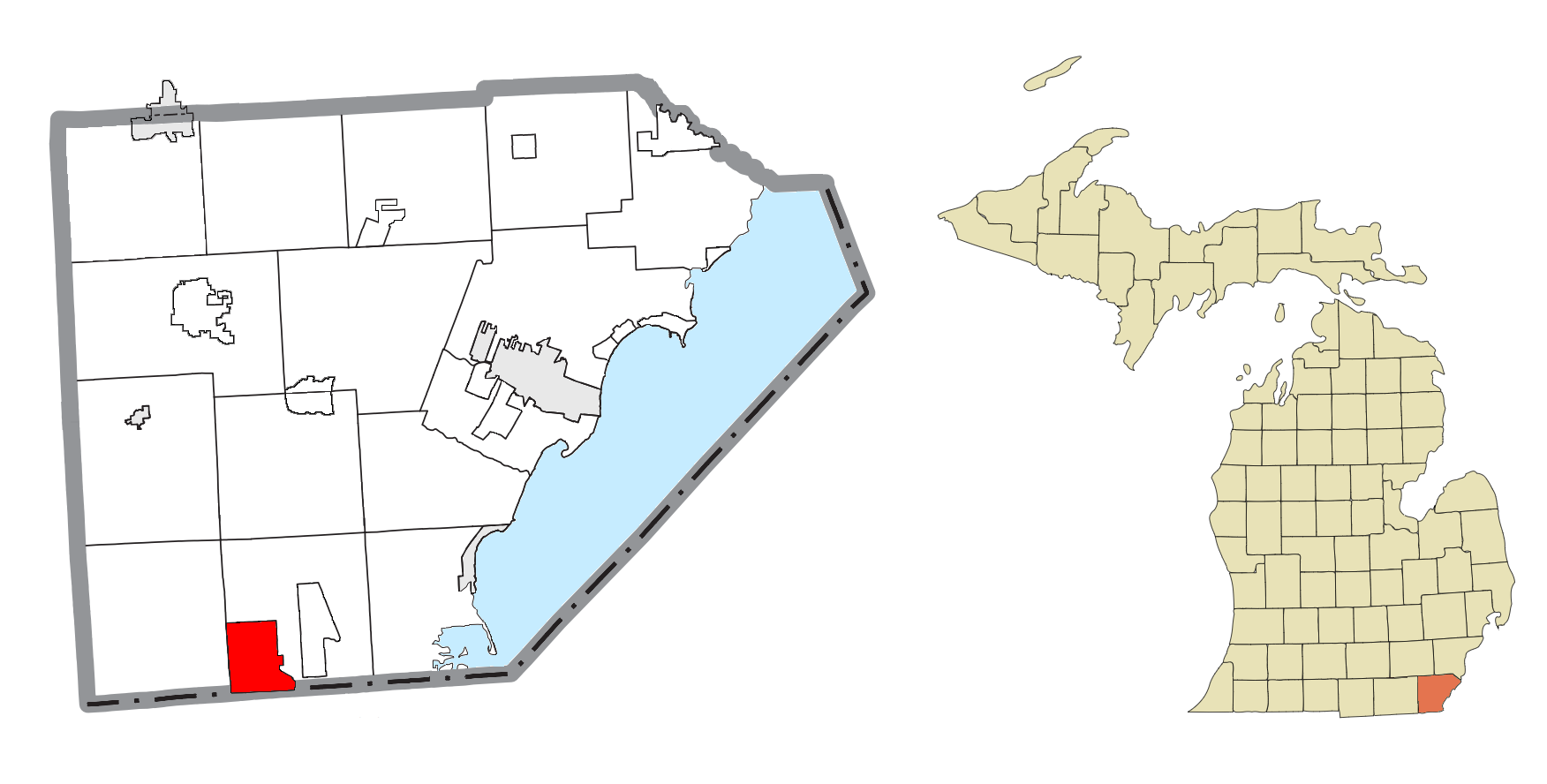
- Location within Monroe County

- Location within the state of Michigan Location within the United States
- Coordinates: 41°45′57″N 83°37′41″W
- Country: United States
- State: Michigan
- County: Monroe
- Township: Bedford

Area
  - Total: 6.75 sq mi (17.48 km^{2})
  - Land: 6.74 sq mi (17.46 km^{2})
  - Water: 0.0077 sq mi (0.02 km^{2})
- Elevation: 669 ft (204 m)

Population (2020)
  - Total: 10,433
  - Density: 1,547.8/sq mi (597.59/km^{2})
- Time zone: UTC-5 (Eastern (EST))
  - Summer (DST): UTC-4 (EDT)
- ZIP code(s): 48144
- Area code: 734
- FIPS code: 26-45420
- GNIS feature ID: 0630097

Lambertville is an unincorporated community and census-designated place (CDP) in Monroe County in the U.S. state of Michigan. The population was 10,433 at the 2020 census. The CDP is located within Bedford Township.

The Lambertville 48144 ZIP Code serves the southwest part of Bedford Township and small portions of Whiteford Township to the west.

== History ==
The community was settled as early as 1832 by John Lambert and was given a post office named West Erie on June 13, 1834 in the Michigan Territory. It was so named due to its western location in Erie Township. The post office was renamed Lambertville on January 15, 1836 when Bedford Township was established. The post office closed briefly from March 25 to December 4, 1865 but has remained in continuous operation ever since.

== Geography ==
According to the U.S. Census Bureau, the CDP has a total area of 6.75 square miles (17.48 km^{2}), of which 6.74 square miles (17.46 km^{2}) is land and 0.01 square miles (0.026 km^{2}) (0.15%) is water.

== Demographics ==
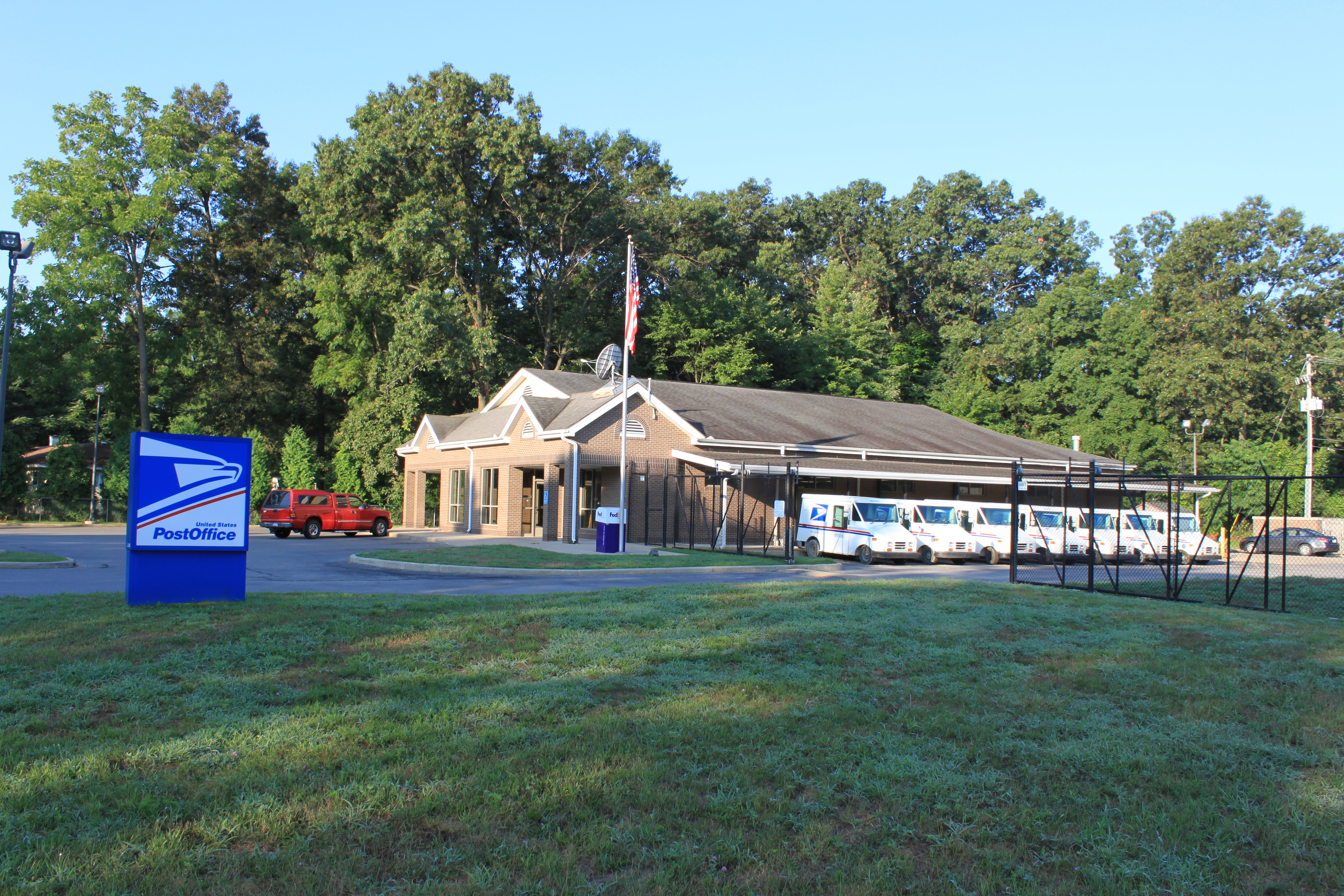
U.S. Post Office in Lambertville

Historical population
Census	Pop.	Note	%±
1990	7,860		—
2000	9,299		18.3%
2010	9,953		7.0%
2020	10,433		4.8%
U.S. Decennial Census

=== 2020 census ===
As of the 2020 census, Lambertville had a population of 10,433. The median age was 46.2 years. 20.5% of residents were under the age of 18 and 22.2% of residents were 65 years of age or older. For every 100 females there were 95.3 males, and for every 100 females age 18 and over there were 94.4 males age 18 and over.

100.0% of residents lived in urban areas, while 0.0% lived in rural areas.

There were 4,189 households in Lambertville, of which 26.5% had children under the age of 18 living in them. Of all households, 59.8% were married-couple households, 15.1% were households with a male householder and no spouse or partner present, and 19.7% were households with a female householder and no spouse or partner present. About 23.2% of all households were made up of individuals and 12.7% had someone living alone who was 65 years of age or older.

There were 4,334 housing units, of which 3.3% were vacant. The homeowner vacancy rate was 0.9% and the rental vacancy rate was 4.7%.

Racial composition as of the 2020 census
Race	Number	Percent
White	9,698	93.0%
Black or African American	60	0.6%
American Indian and Alaska Native	19	0.2%
Asian	96	0.9%
Native Hawaiian and Other Pacific Islander	1	0.0%
Some other race	62	0.6%
Two or more races	497	4.8%
Hispanic or Latino (of any race)	357	3.4%

=== 2000 census ===
As of the census of 2000, there were 9,299 people, 3,315 households, and 2,665 families residing in the CDP. The population density was 1,530.1 inhabitants per square mile (590.8/km^{2}). There were 3,376 housing units at an average density of 555.5 per square mile (214.5/km^{2}). The racial makeup of the CDP was 97.89% White, 0.33% African American, 0.06% Native American, 0.57% Asian, 0.34% from other races, and 0.80% from two or more races. Hispanic or Latino of any race were 1.69% of the population.

There were 3,315 households, out of which 38.6% had children under the age of 18 living with them, 69.4% were married couples living together, 7.6% had a female householder with no husband present, and 19.6% were non-families. 16.0% of all households were made up of individuals, and 7.1% had someone living alone who was 65 years of age or older. The average household size was 2.80 and the average family size was 3.15.

In the CDP the population was spread out, with 28.1% under the age of 18, 6.5% from 18 to 24, 29.1% from 25 to 44, 26.2% from 45 to 64, and 10.1% who were 65 years of age or older. The median age was 38 years. For every 100 females there were 98.4 males. For every 100 females age 18 and over, there were 97.4 males.

The median income for a household in the CDP was $62,221, and the median income for a family was $69,911. Males had a median income of $51,989 versus $34,973 for females. The per capita income for the CDP was $26,475. About 3.2% of families and 4.8% of the population were below the poverty line, including 6.2% of those under age 18 and 7.1% of those age 65 or over.

== Notable people ==
- Leo Marentette, former professional baseball player and Lambertville resident at the time of his death.
- Roy Parmelee, professional baseball player who was born in Lambertville
