= Temperance, Michigan =

- Census-designated place (CDP) & unincorporated community
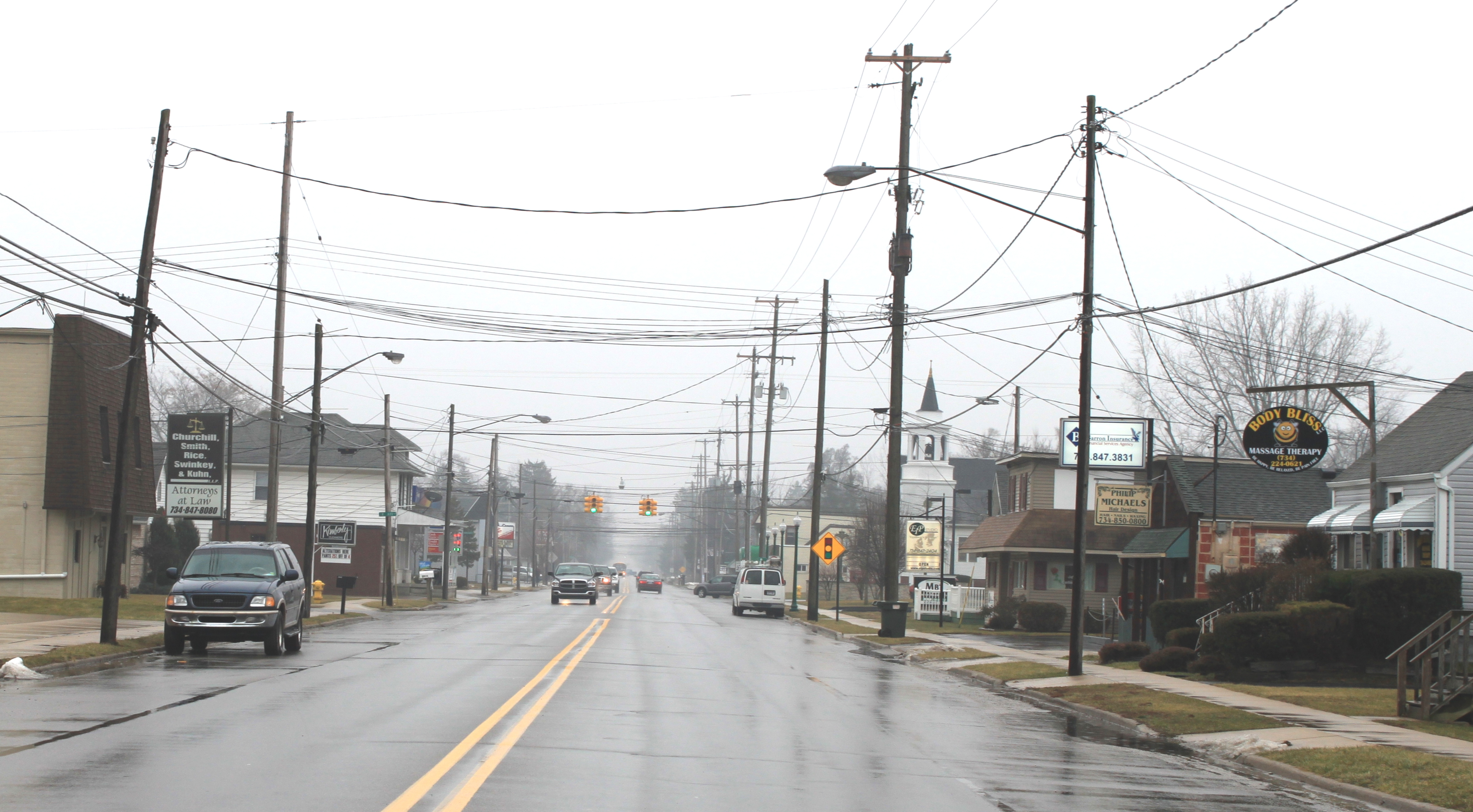
- Lewis Avenue at Temperance Road

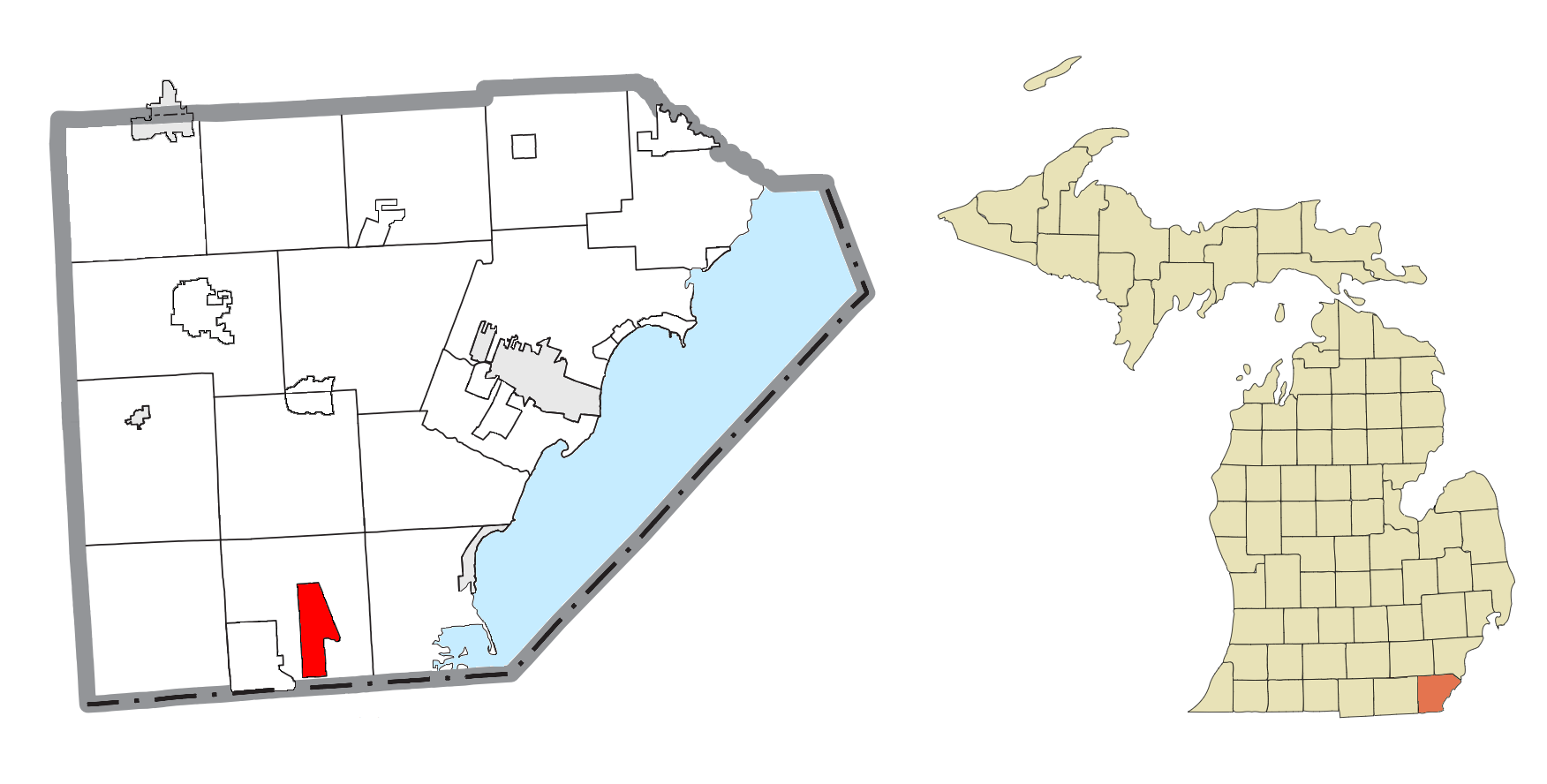
- Location within Monroe County

- Location within the state of Michigan Location within the United States
- Coordinates: 41°46′45″N 83°34′08″W
- Country: United States
- State: Michigan
- County: Monroe
- Township: Bedford

Area
  - Total: 4.64 sq mi (12.02 km^{2})
  - Land: 4.61 sq mi (11.94 km^{2})
  - Water: 0.031 sq mi (0.08 km^{2})
- Elevation: 620 ft (190 m)

Population (2020)
  - Total: 9,188
  - Density: 1,992.4/sq mi (769.26/km^{2})
- Time zone: UTC-5 (Eastern (EST))
  - Summer (DST): UTC-4 (EDT)
- ZIP code(s): 48182
- Area code: 734
- FIPS code: 26-79240
- GNIS feature ID: 1614669

Temperance is an unincorporated community and census-designated place (CDP) in Monroe County in the U.S. state of Michigan. The population was 9,188 at the 2020 census. The CDP is located within Bedford Township.

The community was established as early as 1859. The Temperance 48182 ZIP Code serves most of Bedford Township outside of the Lambertville area, as well as portions of western Erie Township, southern Ida Township, and northeast Whiteford Township.

== History ==
Temperance was established as Bedford Center in 1859. On December 8, 1884, a post office was established at Bedford Center and was named Temperance with Lewis Ansted as the first postmaster. The name "Temperance" was suggested by the wife of one of the founding land owners, who was a member of the Woman's Christian Temperance Union. A petition was circulated and the name Bedford Center was changed to Temperance. During the early years of Temperance, the sale and consumption of alcoholic beverages was prohibited.

== Geography ==
According to the U.S. Census Bureau, the CDP has a total area of 4.64 square miles (12.02 km^{2}), of which 4.61 square miles (11.94 km^{2}) is land and 0.03 square miles (0.08 km^{2}) (0.68%) is water.

=== Climate ===
Climate data for Temperance, Michigan
Month	Jan	Feb	Mar	Apr	May	Jun	Jul	Aug	Sep	Oct	Nov	Dec	Year
Mean daily maximum °F (°C)	32.2 (0.1)	36.0 (2.2)	44.8 (7.1)	58.6 (14.8)	70.2 (21.2)	80.4 (26.9)	84.0 (28.9)	81.9 (27.7)	74.8 (23.8)	62.8 (17.1)	49.5 (9.7)	36.0 (2.2)	59.3 (15.1)
Daily mean °F (°C)	23.7 (−4.6)	26.2 (−3.2)	34.7 (1.5)	46.9 (8.3)	57.9 (14.4)	68.5 (20.3)	72.1 (22.3)	69.8 (21.0)	62.4 (16.9)	50.7 (10.4)	40.3 (4.6)	28.2 (−2.1)	48.4 (9.2)
Mean daily minimum °F (°C)	15.3 (−9.3)	16.5 (−8.6)	24.6 (−4.1)	35.2 (1.8)	45.7 (7.6)	56.7 (13.7)	60.1 (15.6)	57.7 (14.3)	50.2 (10.1)	38.7 (3.7)	30.7 (−0.7)	20.3 (−6.5)	37.6 (3.1)
Source: "Monthly All Weather Averages Temperance, Michigan". weatherbase.com.

== Demographics ==
Historical population
Census	Pop.	Note	%±
1990	6,542		—
2000	7,757		18.6%
2010	8,517		9.8%
2020	9,188		7.9%
U.S. Decennial Census

=== 2020 census ===
As of the 2020 census, Temperance had a population of 9,188. The median age was 43.8 years. 20.4% of residents were under the age of 18 and 21.6% of residents were 65 years of age or older. For every 100 females there were 97.5 males, and for every 100 females age 18 and over there were 95.2 males age 18 and over.

100.0% of residents lived in urban areas, while 0.0% lived in rural areas.

There were 3,806 households in Temperance, of which 27.5% had children under the age of 18 living in them. Of all households, 53.7% were married-couple households, 15.9% were households with a male householder and no spouse or partner present, and 23.8% were households with a female householder and no spouse or partner present. About 27.8% of all households were made up of individuals and 14.2% had someone living alone who was 65 years of age or older.

There were 3,953 housing units, of which 3.7% were vacant. The homeowner vacancy rate was 0.8% and the rental vacancy rate was 5.2%.

Racial composition as of the 2020 census
Race	Number	Percent
White	8,427	91.7%
Black or African American	76	0.8%
American Indian and Alaska Native	15	0.2%
Asian	70	0.8%
Native Hawaiian and Other Pacific Islander	2	0.0%
Some other race	98	1.1%
Two or more races	500	5.4%
Hispanic or Latino (of any race)	353	3.8%

=== 2000 census ===
As of the census of 2000, there were 7,757 people, 2,857 households, and 2,177 families residing in the CDP. The population density was 1,688.0 inhabitants per square mile (651.7/km^{2}). There were 2,953 housing units at an average density of 642.6 per square mile (248.1/km^{2}). The racial makeup of the CDP was 98.10% White, 0.19% African American, 0.14% Native American, 0.53% Asian, 0.01% Pacific Islander, 0.40% from other races, and 0.62% from two or more races. Hispanic or Latino of any race were 1.93% of the population.

There were 2,857 households, out of which 37.0% had children under the age of 18 living with them, 65.3% were married couples living together, 8.3% had a female householder with no husband present, and 23.8% were non-families. 20.2% of all households were made up of individuals, and 8.9% had someone living alone who was 65 years of age or older. The average household size was 2.68 and the average family size was 3.11.

In the CDP, the population was spread out, with 27.3% under the age of 18, 6.1% from 18 to 24, 29.2% from 25 to 44, 25.3% from 45 to 64, and 12.0% who were 65 years of age or older. The median age was 38 years. For every 100 females, there were 96.7 males. For every 100 females age 18 and over, there were 91.3 males.

The median income for a household in the CDP was $61,090, and the median income for a family was $70,230. Males had a median income of $51,182 versus $30,233 for females. The per capita income for the CDP was $24,237. About 2.3% of families and 3.6% of the population were below the poverty line, including 3.7% of those under age 18 and 2.9% of those age 65 or over.

== Notable people ==
- Harry Bidwell Ansted, pastor and educator
- Marty Huff, former NFL linebacker
- Bob Loga, stock car driver
- John Marcum, racing driver
- Norm Shinkle, former member of the Michigan Senate
- Joey Wiemer, professional baseball player
- Angela Yeo, professional bodybuilder

== Education ==
St. Anthony School of the Roman Catholic Archdiocese of Detroit was in Temperance. It opened in 1944.
