= Point Place (Toledo, Ohio) =

Neighborhood of Toledo, Ohio, United States

- Neighborhood
- Interactive map of Point Place
- Coordinates: 41°43′08″N 83°28′46″W
- Country: United States
- State: Ohio
- County: Lucas
- City: Toledo
- Originally part of: Washington Township (1800s)
- Annexed to Toledo: 1937
- Time zone: UTC−5 (EST)
  - Summer (DST): UTC−4 (EDT)
- Area code(s): 419, 567
- Location: Northeast corner of Toledo
- Waterways: Ottawa River; Lake Erie; Maumee Bay; Maumee River
- Major roads: I-75; I-280; Summit Street
- Notable landmarks: Toledo Yacht Club (1865); Bay View Park

Point Place is a neighborhood on the North East corner of Toledo, Ohio. The district sits just north of the North River neighborhood and east of Washington Township. Point Place was originally part of Washington Township, Lucas County in the 1800s, and was annexed into the city of Toledo, Ohio in 1937. Point Place is surrounded by the Ottawa River, Lake Erie, the Maumee Bay and the Maumee River.

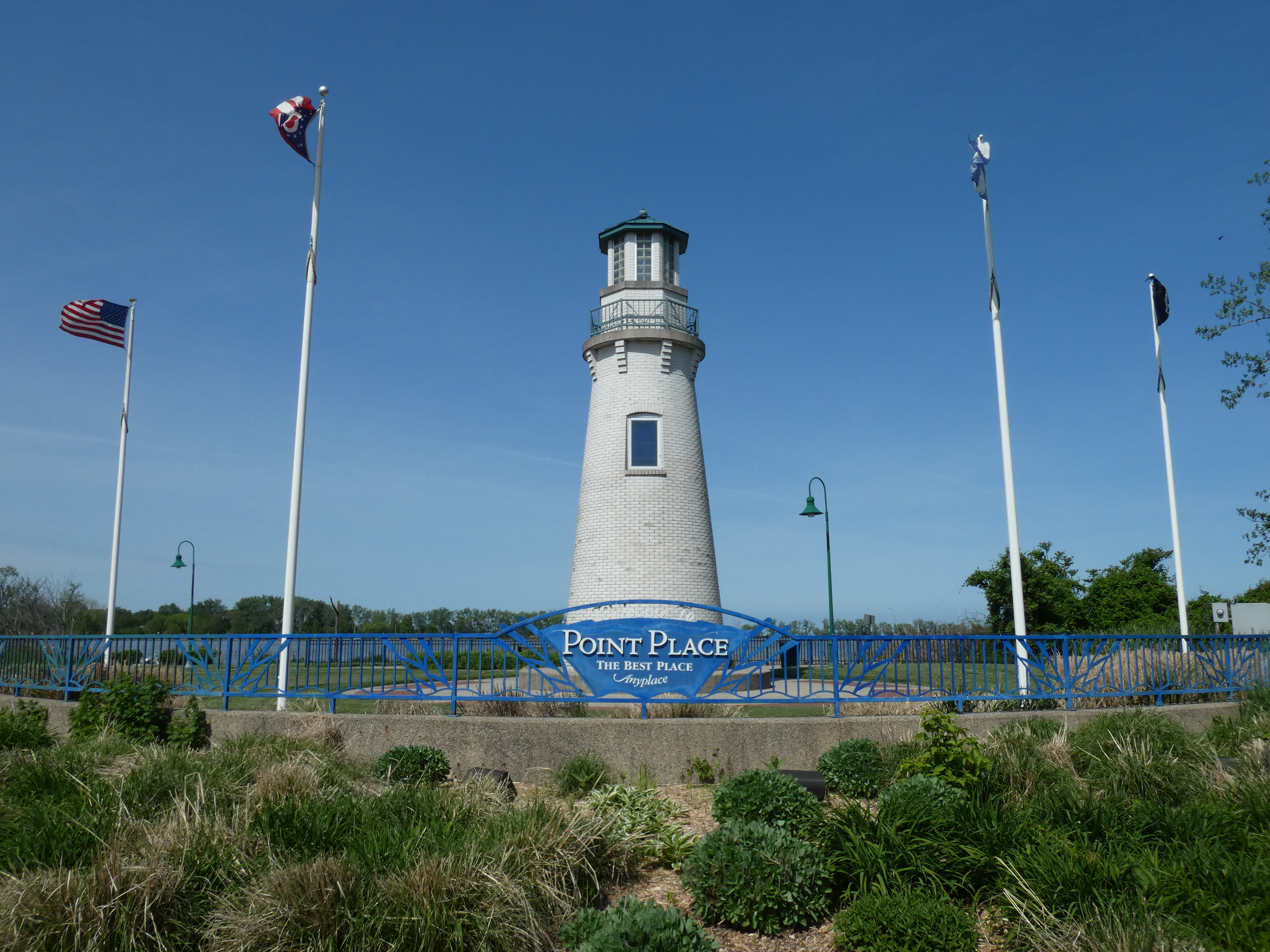
Point Place lighthouse at Bay View Park.

Today, Point Place is home to many docks, parks, and yacht clubs. Of those include the Toledo Yacht Club, which was formed in 1865 and is now located in Bay View Park.

== History ==
In 1935, the Toledo City Council voted against the purchase of Point Place from Washington Township. However in 1937, Point Place was annexed by the city of Toledo as they promised paved roads, sidewalks, city services, and better police protection to deal with the growing problem of prohibition and gambling problems that the area experienced at the time. As a result, Point Place was no longer part of the Washington Township Police & Fire Department. In 1949, the Willow Beach Amusement Area closed due to a death on one of the rides. In the same year, the Toledo Onboard Club formed, which would later become the River View Yacht Club. On April 11th of 1965, Point Place endured one of the many tornadoes part of the Palm Sunday Outbreak, which leveled many homes and businesses in the community. The tornado reached around 240 mph as the death toll reached 18 in Point Place once the tornado concluded.

== Transportation ==
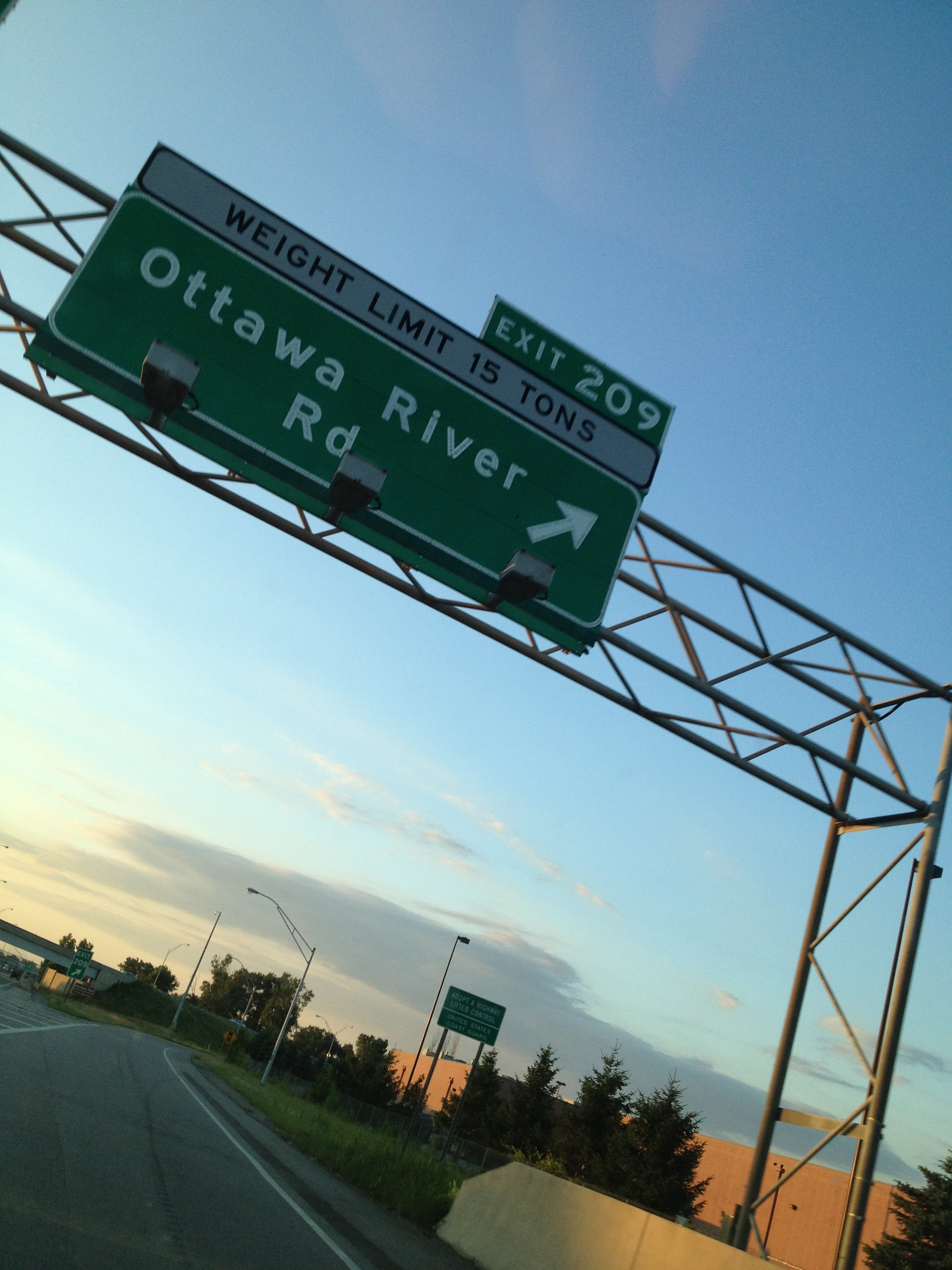
I-75 Exit 209, Weight Limit 15 Tons, Ottawa River Rd

Point Place is near two major interstates, I-75, and I-280, which connects to I-80/I-90. Summit Street runs through the middle of Point Place and serves as the major center of commerce.

== Parks ==
- Cullen Park
- Detwiler Park
- Edgewater Park
- Friendship Park
- Harry Kessler Park
- Shoreland Park
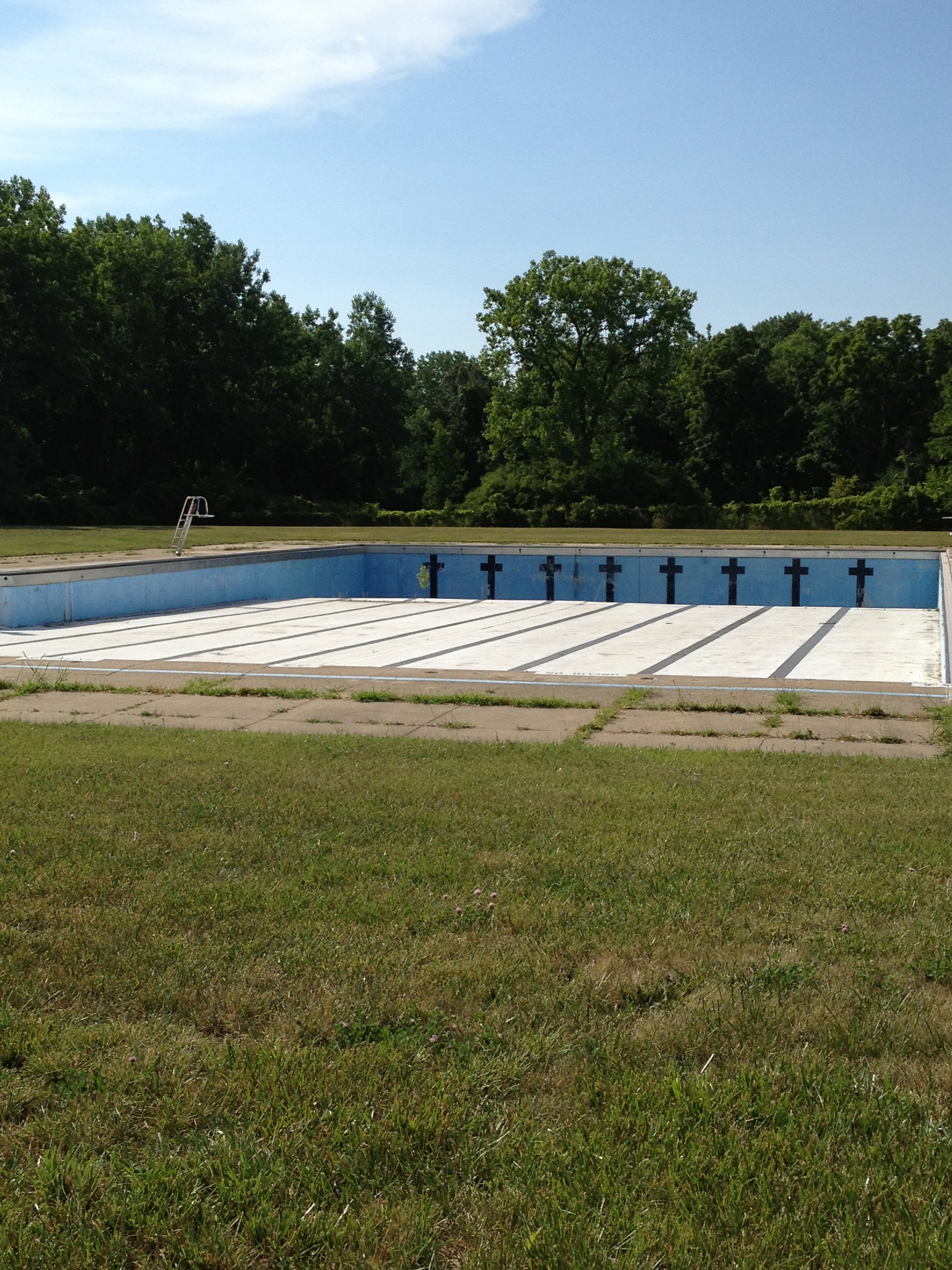
The empty public pool at Detwiler Park in Point Place Ohio.

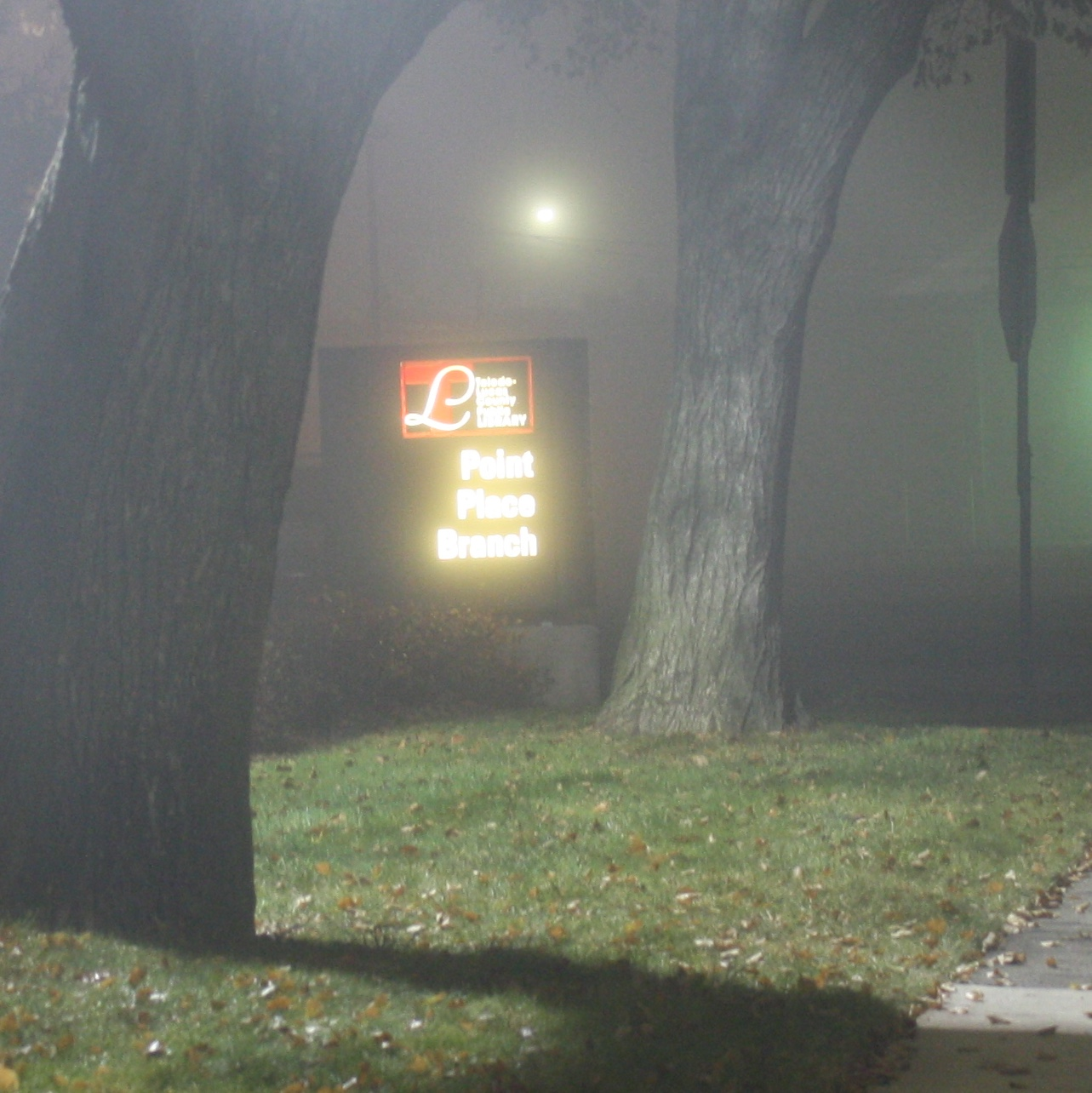
Illuminated street sign for Toledo Lucas County Public Library, Point Place branch.

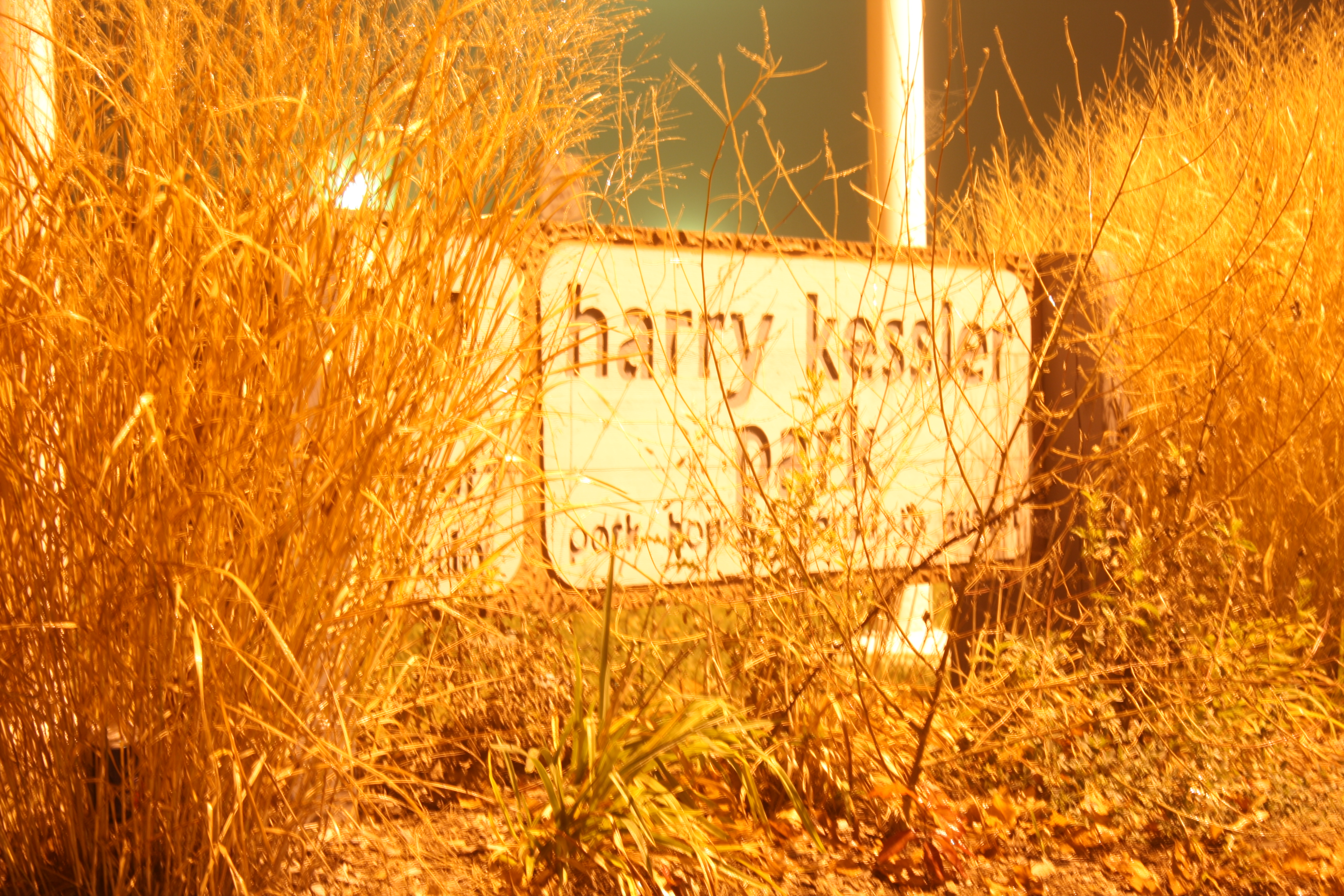
Harry Kessler Park Signage

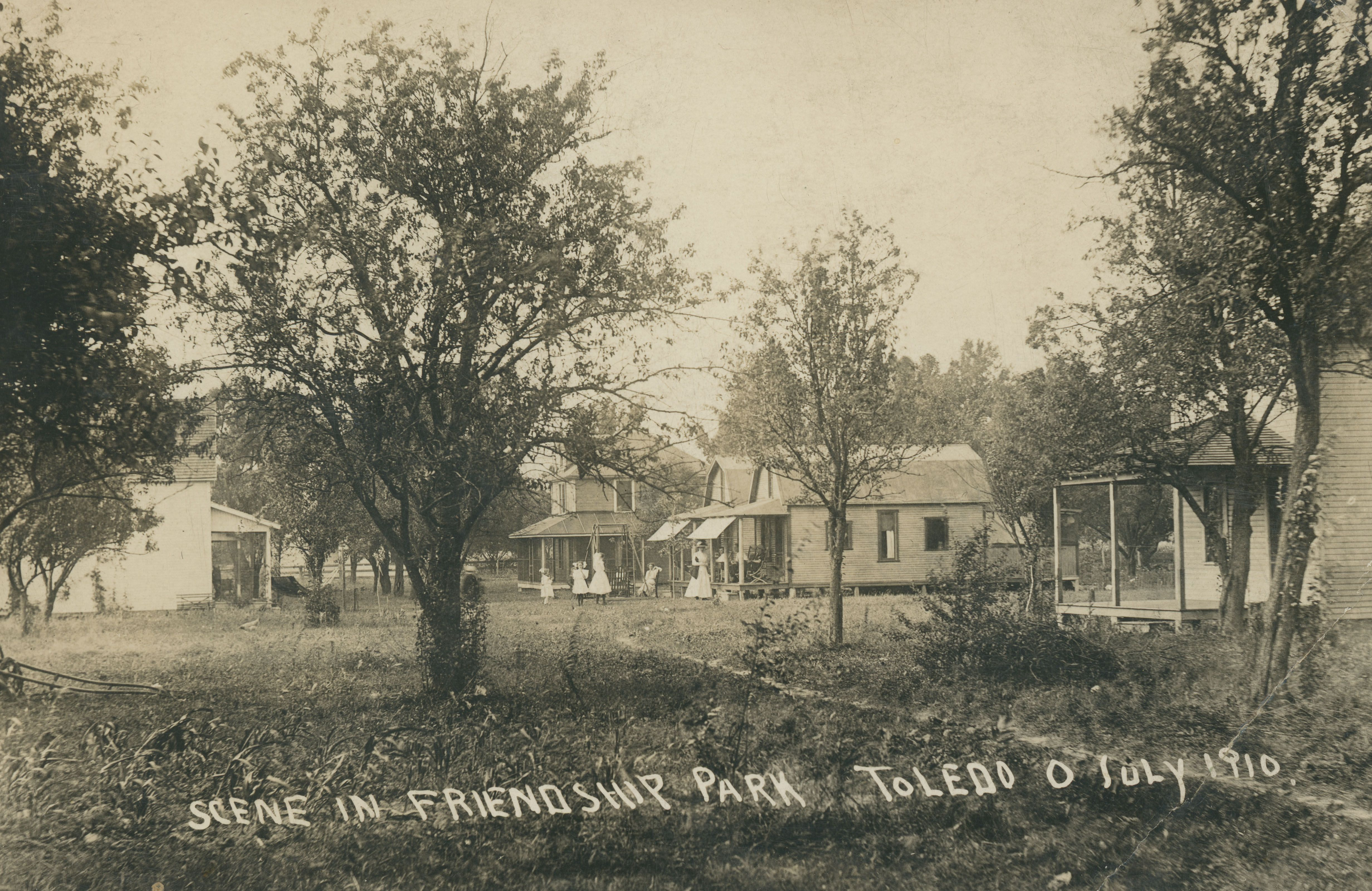
Friendship Park in 1910

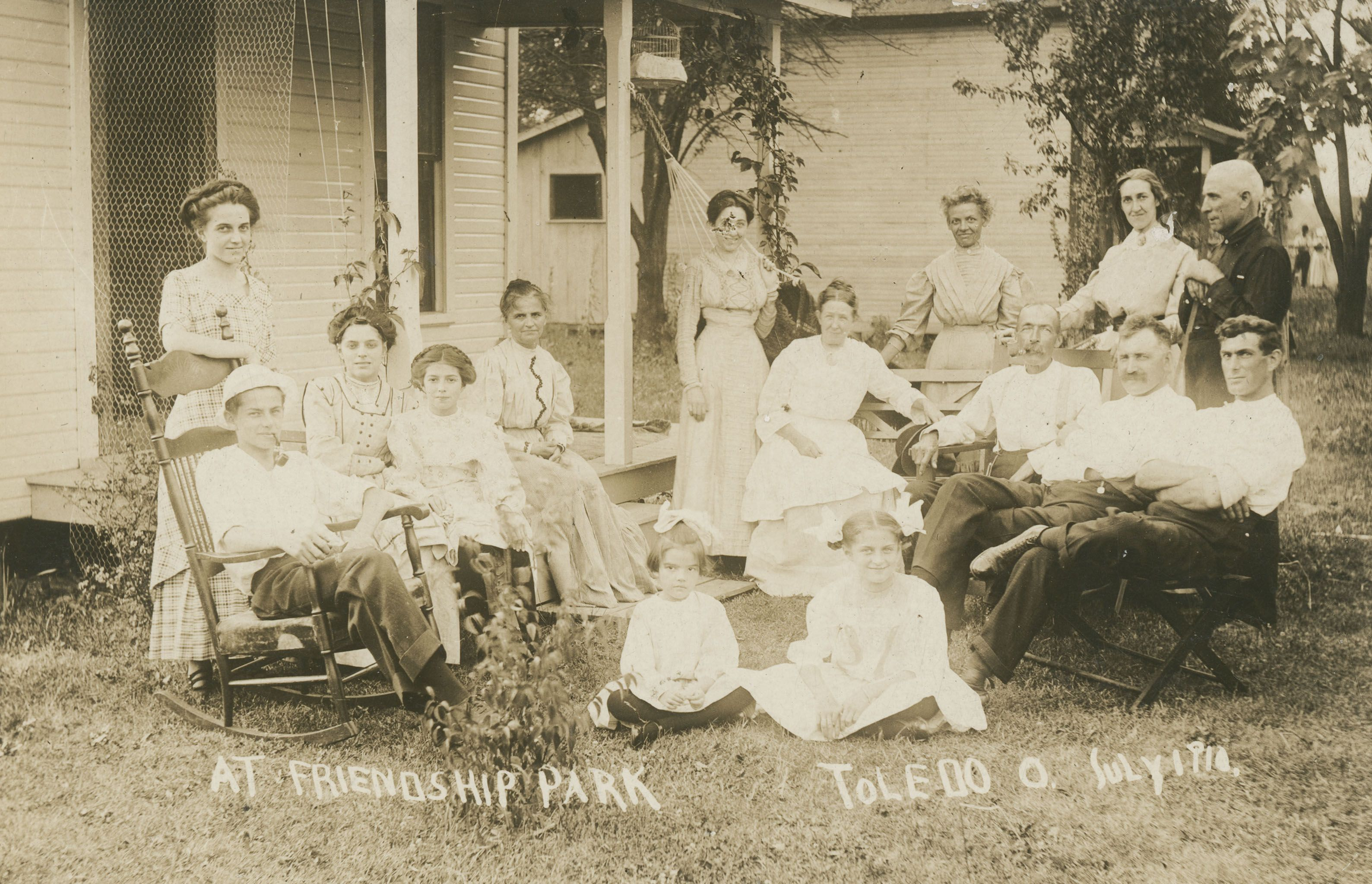
Friendship Park in 1910

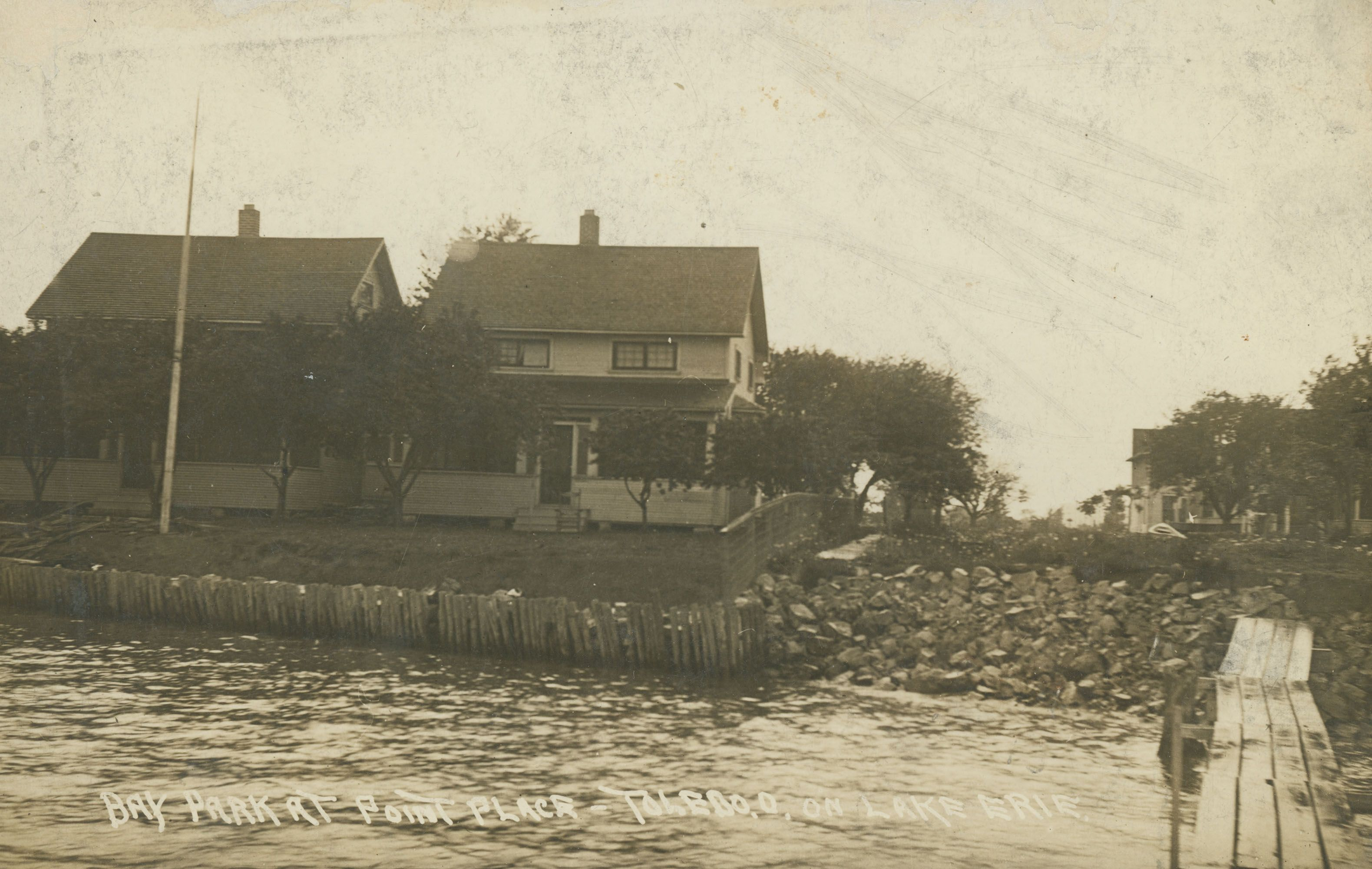
Bay Park in 1913
