= Gard Island =

Island in Michigan

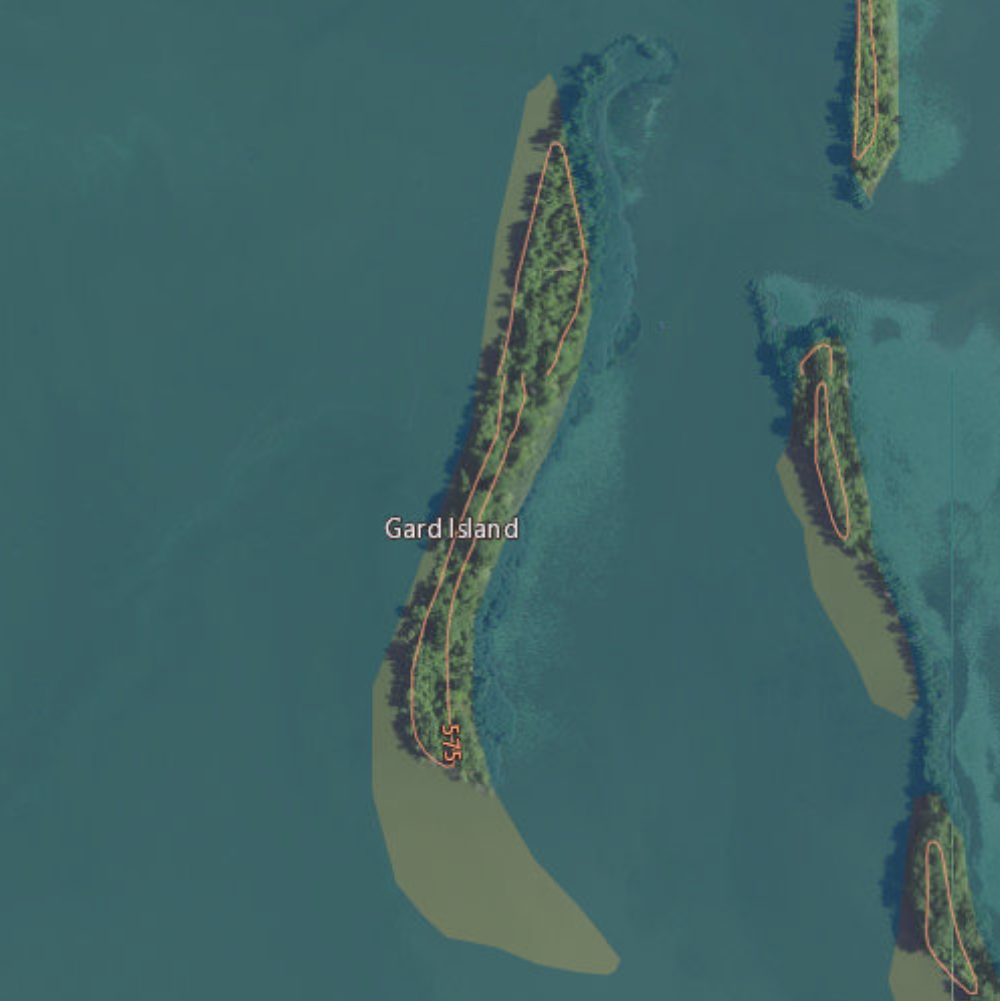
- USGS aerial imagery of Gard Island

- Location within Michigan Location within the United States

Geography
- Location: Michigan
- Coordinates: 41°44′55″N 83°26′37″W
- Adjacent to: Maumee Bay
- Highest elevation: 568 ft (173.1 m)

Administration
- United States
- State: Michigan
- County: Monroe

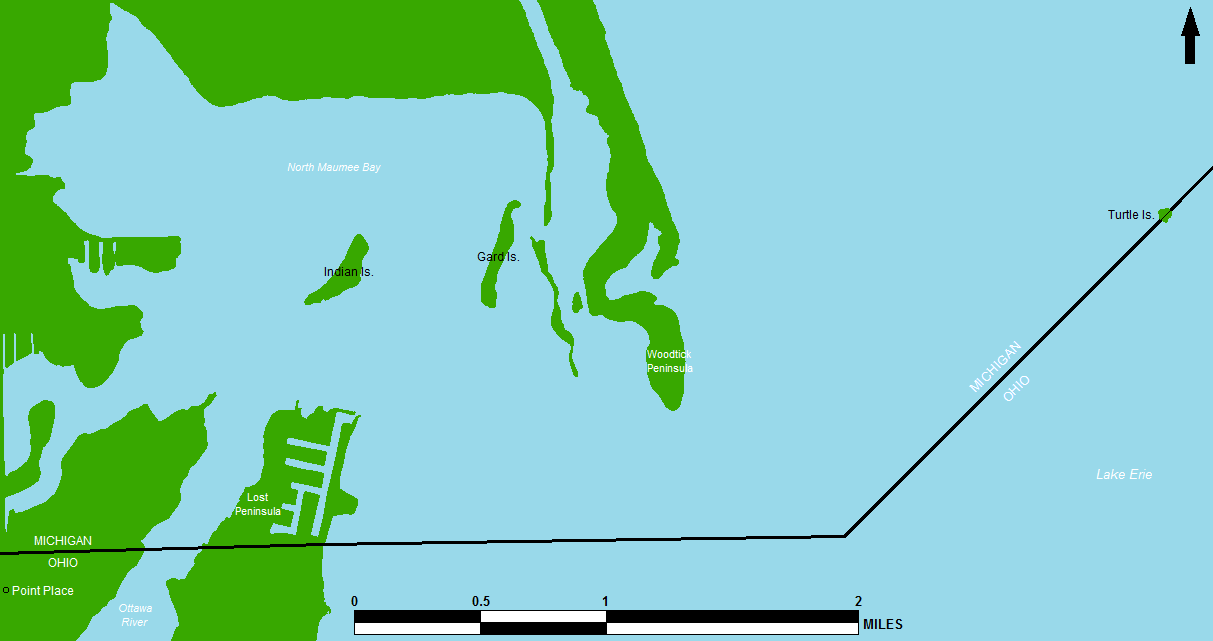
Indian Island and Gard Island in North Maumee Bay

Gard Island is an island located in Maumee Bay, in Monroe County, Michigan. Its coordinates are 41°44′55″N 83°26′37″W, and according to the United States Geological Survey its elevation as 568 ft (173 m) in 1980. It was labeled "Guard Island", along with Indian Island and Squaw Island, on a 1900 USGS map of the area. A 1938 map showed it alongside Indian Island, Odeen Island, and Woodtick Island.
