= Indian Island (Lake Erie) =

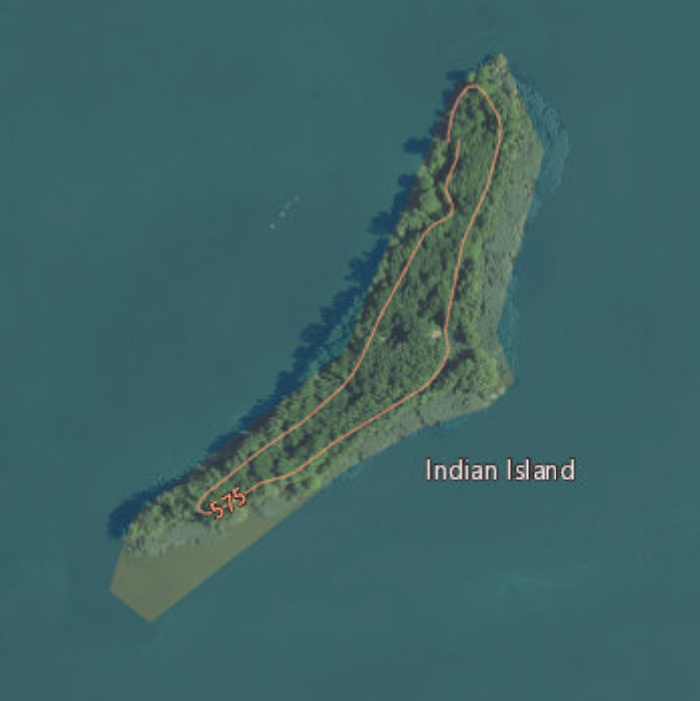
- USGS aerial imagery of Indian Island

- Location within Michigan

Geography
- Location: North Maumee Bay; Lake Erie
- Coordinates: 41°44′55″N 83°27′14″W
- Highest elevation: 569 ft (173.4 m)

Administration
- United States
- State: Michigan
- County: Monroe
- Township: Erie Township

Demographics
- Population: 0 (permanent)

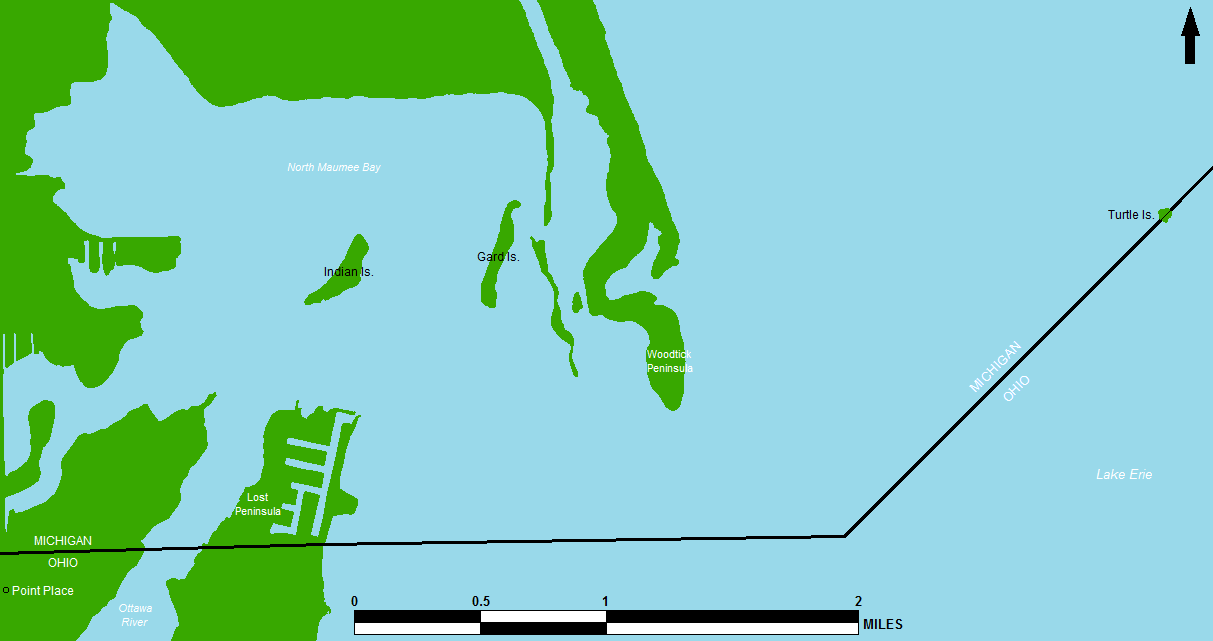
Indian Island and Gard Island in North Maumee Bay

Indian Island is a small island of the U.S. state of Michigan, located at the north end of Maumee Bay in Lake Erie. It is located just off shore of the northeast tip of the "Lost Peninsula", an exclave created by the Michigan-Ohio boundary line. It is part of Erie Township in Monroe County.

It was never known to have been inhabited. On older USGS topographic maps, it was labeled (possibly erroneously) as "Odeen Island", while an island nearby to the west was referred to as "Indian Island".
