= Washington Township, Lucas County, Ohio =

Township in Ohio, US

- Township
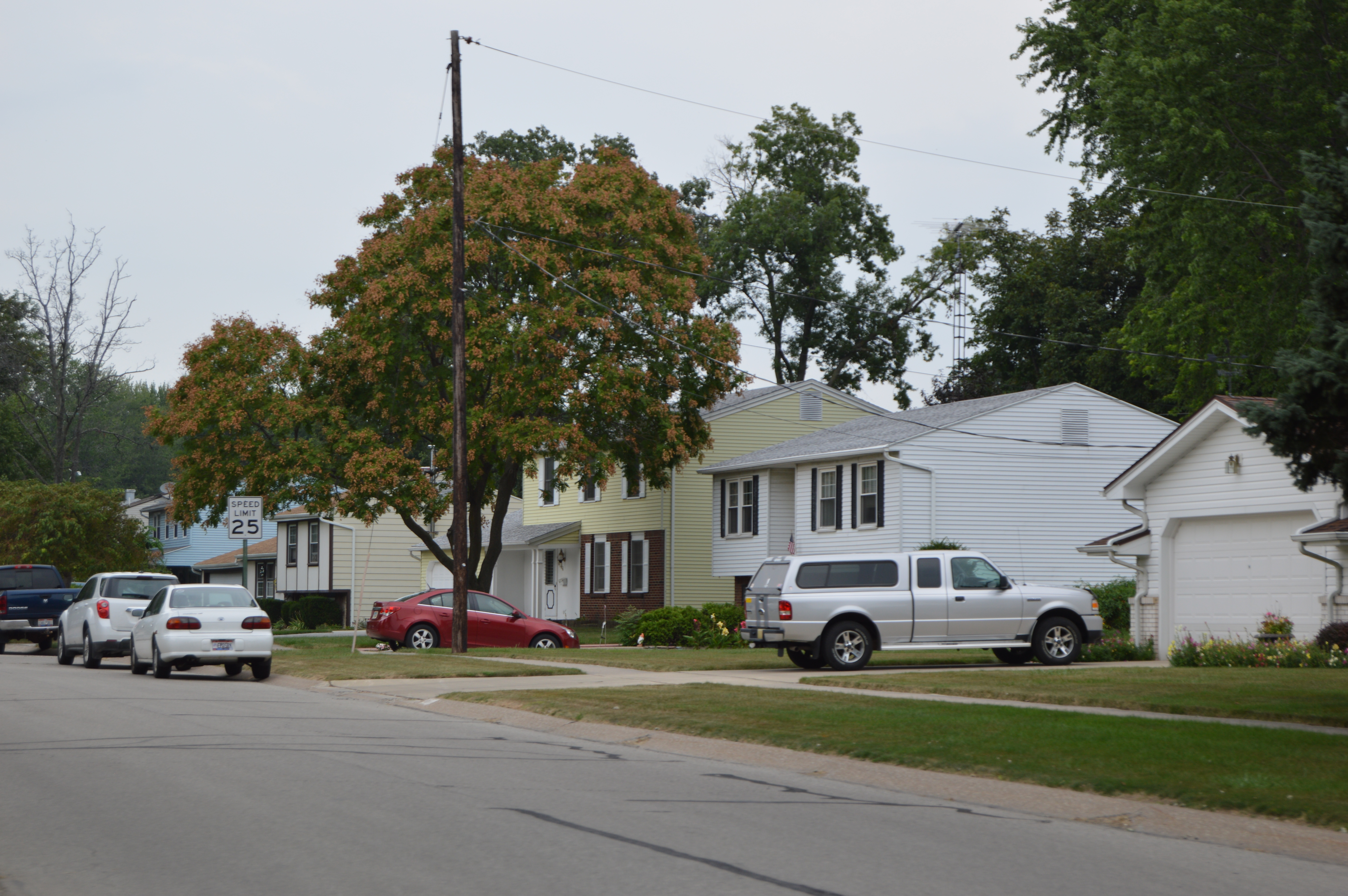
- Houses in the township's eastern section

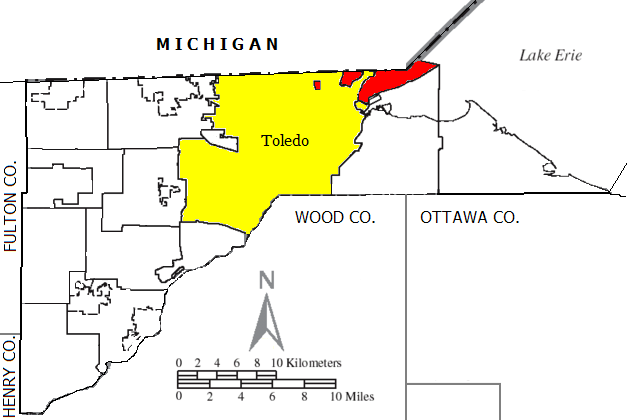
- Map of Washington Township
- Coordinates: 41°43′22″N 83°29′27″W
- Country: United States
- State: Ohio
- County: Lucas

Area
  - Total: 6.6 sq mi (17.2 km^{2})
  - Land: 0.93 sq mi (2.4 km^{2})
  - Water: 5.7 sq mi (14.8 km^{2})
- Elevation: 584 ft (178 m)

Population (2020)
  - Total: 3,055
  - Density: 3,300/sq mi (1,300/km^{2})
- Time zone: UTC-5 (Eastern (EST))
  - Summer (DST): UTC-4 (EDT)
- FIPS code: 39-81438
- GNIS feature ID: 1086538
- Website: www.washington-twp.com

Washington Township is one of the eleven townships of Lucas County, Ohio, United States. The 2020 census found 3,055 people in the township.

== Communities ==
- Alexis Addition is an unincorporated community located at 41°43′11″N 83°31′37″W and is completely surrounded by Toledo, Ohio. The Raintree Mobile Home Village is located in Alexis Addition. The Township hall is located in Alexis Addition.
- Shoreland is an unincorporated community located at 41°43′23″N 83°29′30″W in the eastern portion of the township.

== Geography ==
Most of what was once Washington Township is now incorporated, leaving only two small pieces. Those pieces have the following borders:

- Western piece: completely surrounded by Toledo
- Eastern piece: surrounded by Toledo, except for a border on Erie Township, Monroe County, Michigan in the north

A small part of Maumee Bay is also included in Washington Township.

No municipalities are located in Washington Township.

== Name and history ==
It is one of forty-three Washington Townships statewide.

Washington Township was organized in 1840.

== Government ==
The township is governed by a three-member board of trustees, who are elected in November of odd-numbered years to a four-year term beginning on the following January 1. Two are elected in the year after the presidential election and one is elected in the year before it. There is also an elected township fiscal officer, who serves a four-year term beginning on April 1 of the year after the election, which is held in November of the year before the presidential election. Vacancies in the fiscal officership or on the board of trustees are filled by the remaining trustees.
