= Shoreland, Ohio =

- Unincorporated community
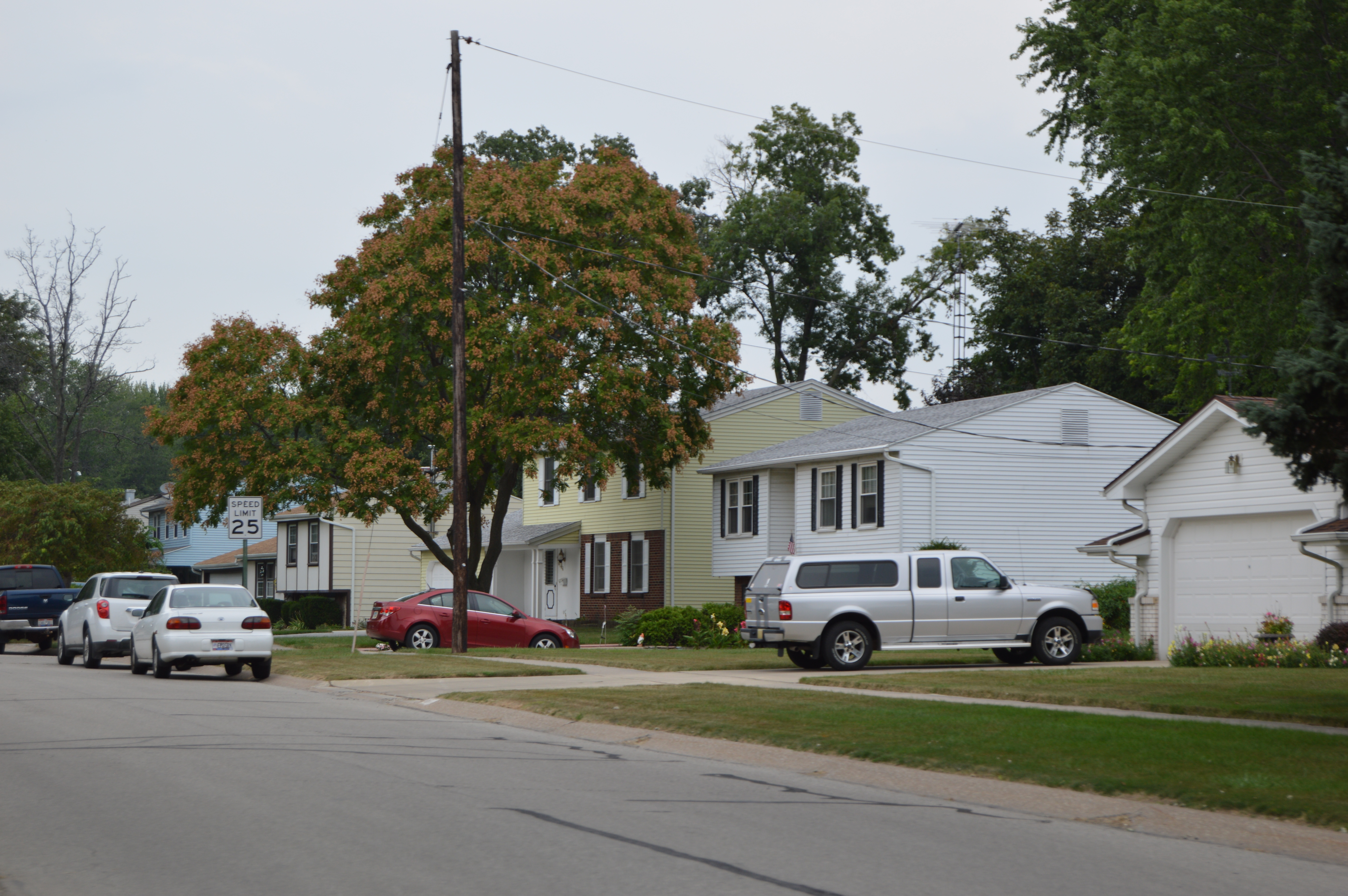
- Neighborhood in Shoreland

- Location within Ohio Location within the United States
- Coordinates: 41°43′23″N 83°29′30″W
- Country: United States
- State: Ohio
- County: Lucas
- Township: Washington
- Time zone: UTC-5 (Eastern (EST))
  - Summer (DST): UTC-4 (EDT)
- ZIP code: 43611

Shoreland is an unincorporated community is largely located within Washington Township with a smaller part in the city of Toledo in Lucas County, Ohio along the Michigan-Ohio border. Shoreland is located east off I-75 and north of the Ottawa River. Shantee Creek flows through the center dividing the peninsular portion of the neighborhood from the mainland.

Located within Shoreland are Washington Township Fire Department and Shoreland Elementary School, which is part of the Washington Local School District.

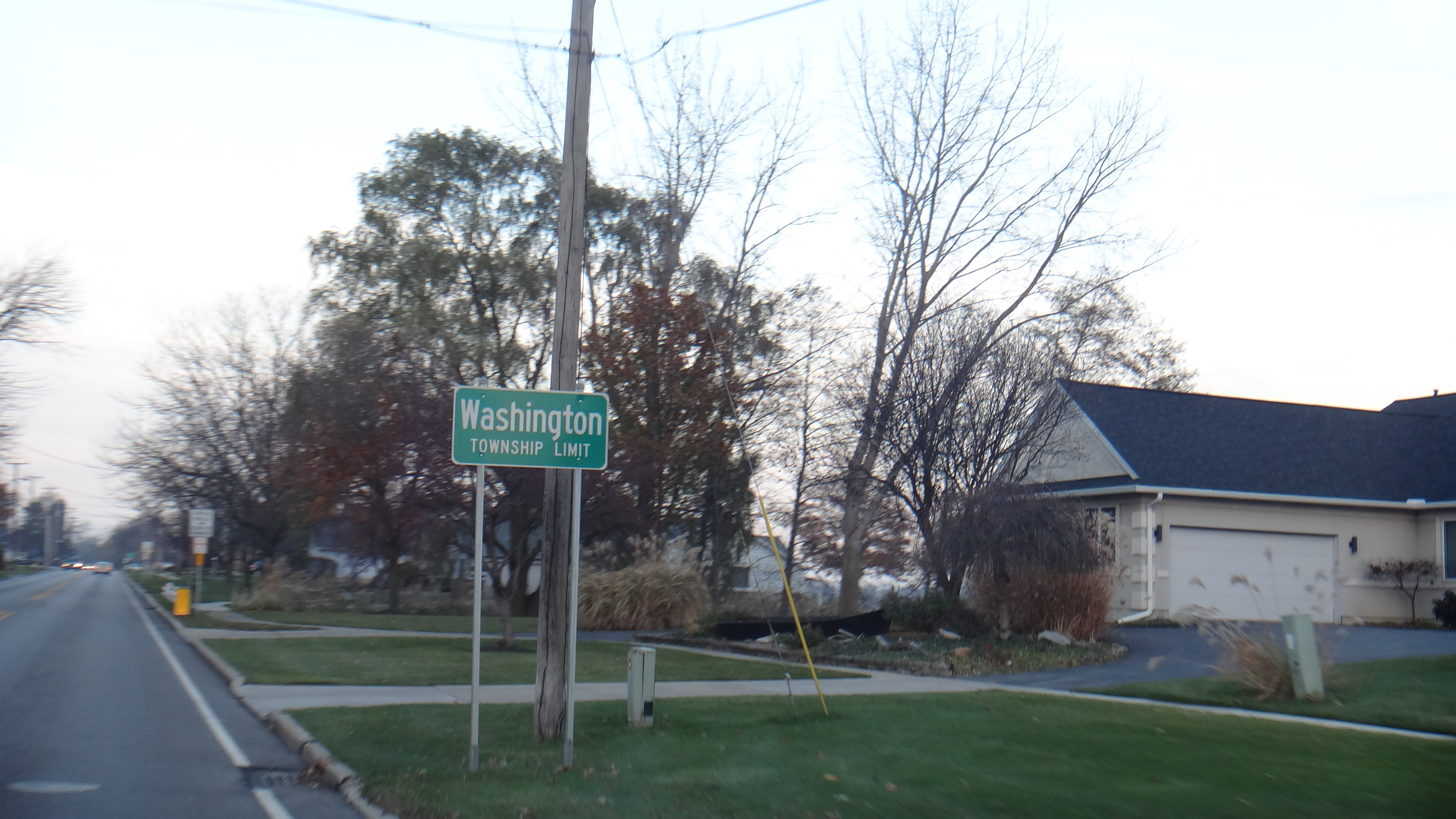
Washington Township Limit sign located in Shoreland.

== Geography ==
- Shoreland is bordered by the city of Toledo from the west and the south.
- Shoreland is bordered by Erie Township, Michigan to the north.

=== Geographic features ===
- Shoreland is located on the shores of the upper banks of the Ottawa River.
- Shoreland is part of Northwest Ohio.
- Shoreland park is a small local park is located in Shoreland.

=== Major highways ===
- runs along the western boundary of the community.
