= Maumee Bay =

Bay in Ohio, United States

Coordinates: 41°41′8.75″N 83°22′18.52″W

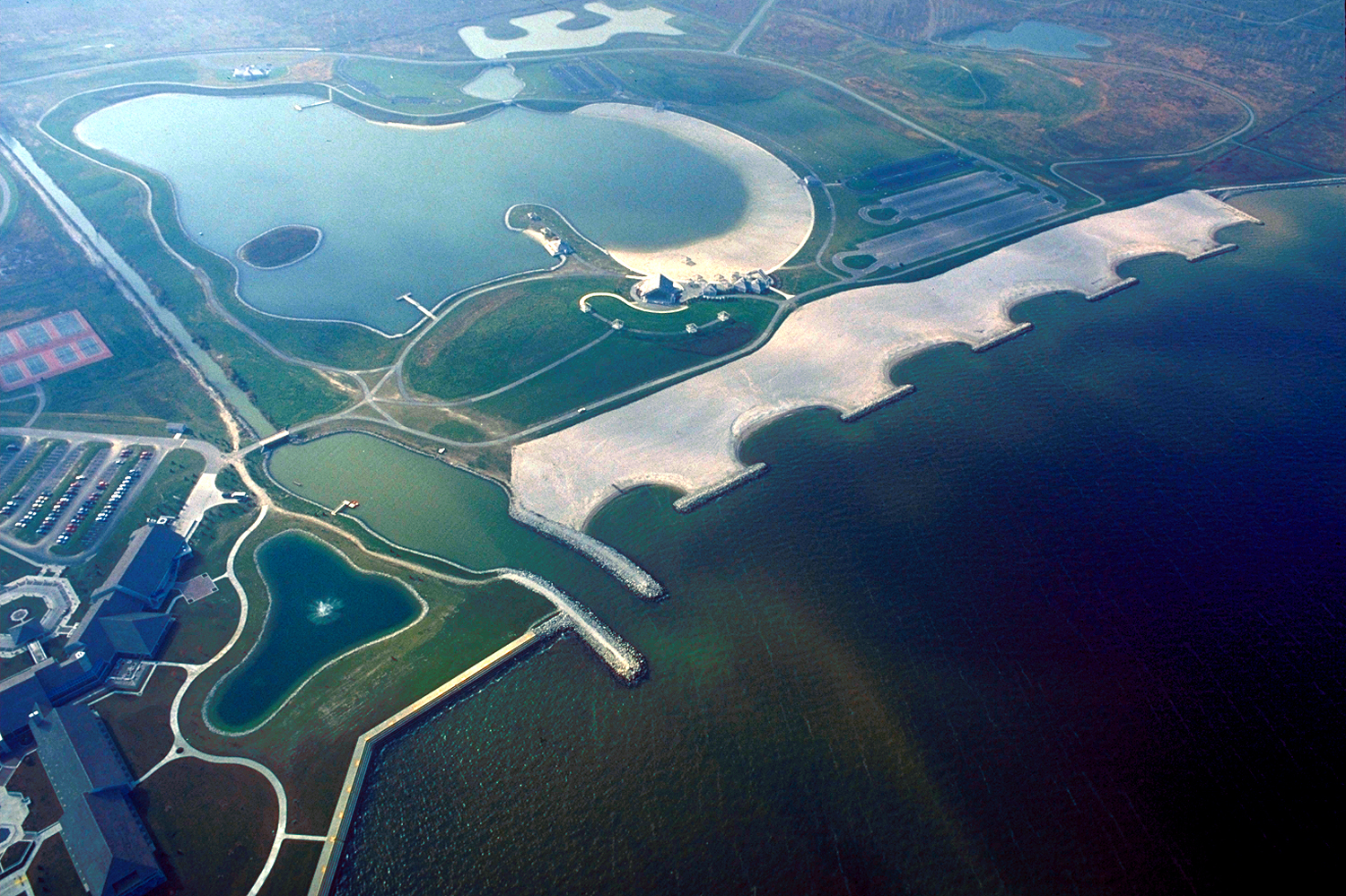
Aerial view of Maumee Bay State Park

Maumee Bay on Lake Erie is located in the U.S. state of Ohio, just east of the city of Toledo. The bay and the surrounding wetlands form most of the Maumee River basin, and in 1975 part of the area was incorporated into Maumee Bay State Park. The park is not huge, covering 1,450 acres (5.9 km^{2}), but its wetlands feature some of the best bird watching in the United States. The Maumee Bay area is a popular vacation spot in the Midwest, featuring several resorts and a golf course.

== North Maumee Bay ==
North Maumee Bay is a smaller part of Maumee Bay which combines the outflow of the Ottawa River, Halfway Creek, Rapideau Drain, Flat Creek, Little Lake Creek and Bay Creek.

== Historical Images of Maumee Bay ==
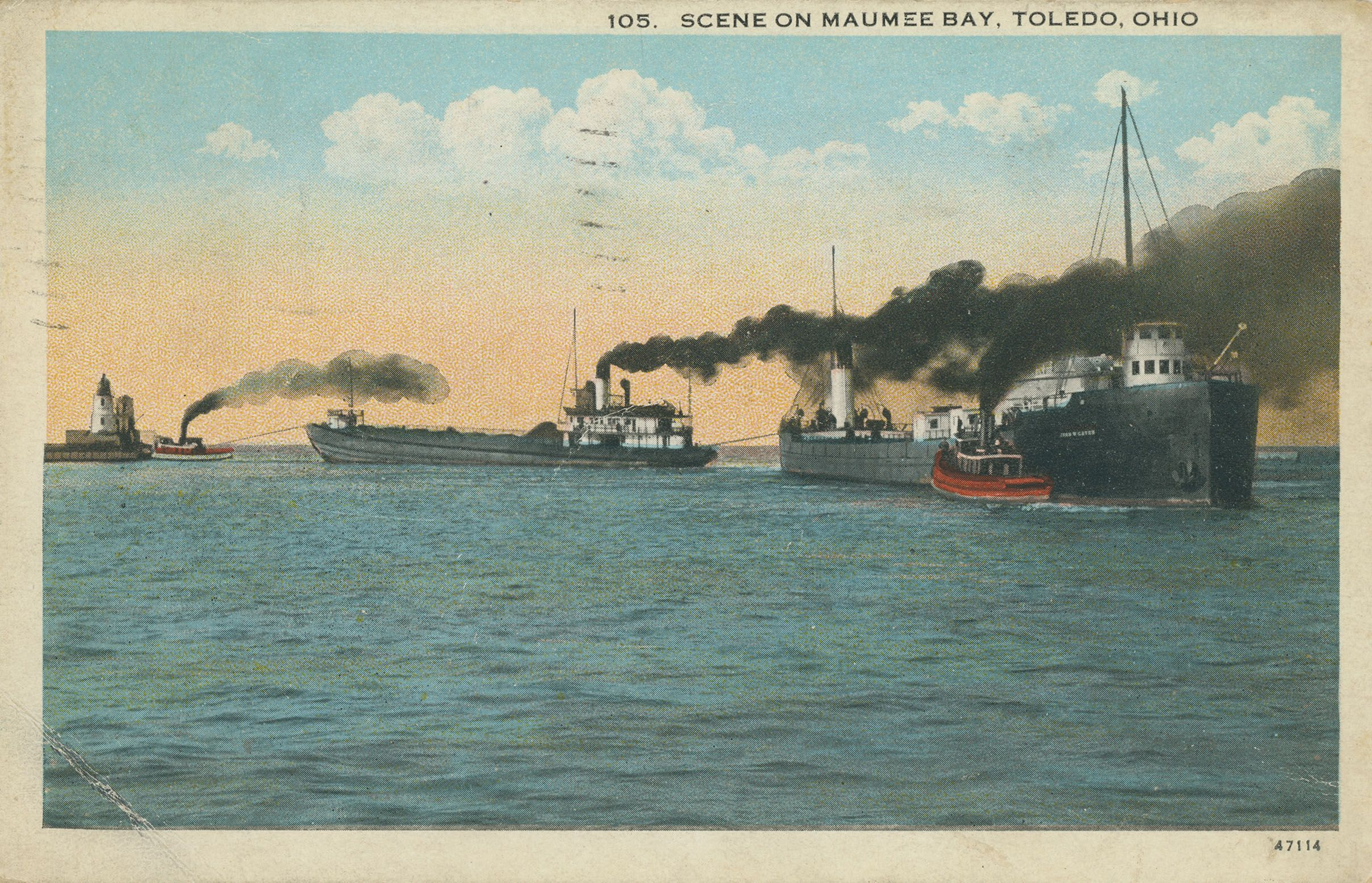
Scene on Maumee Bay, Toledo, Ohio

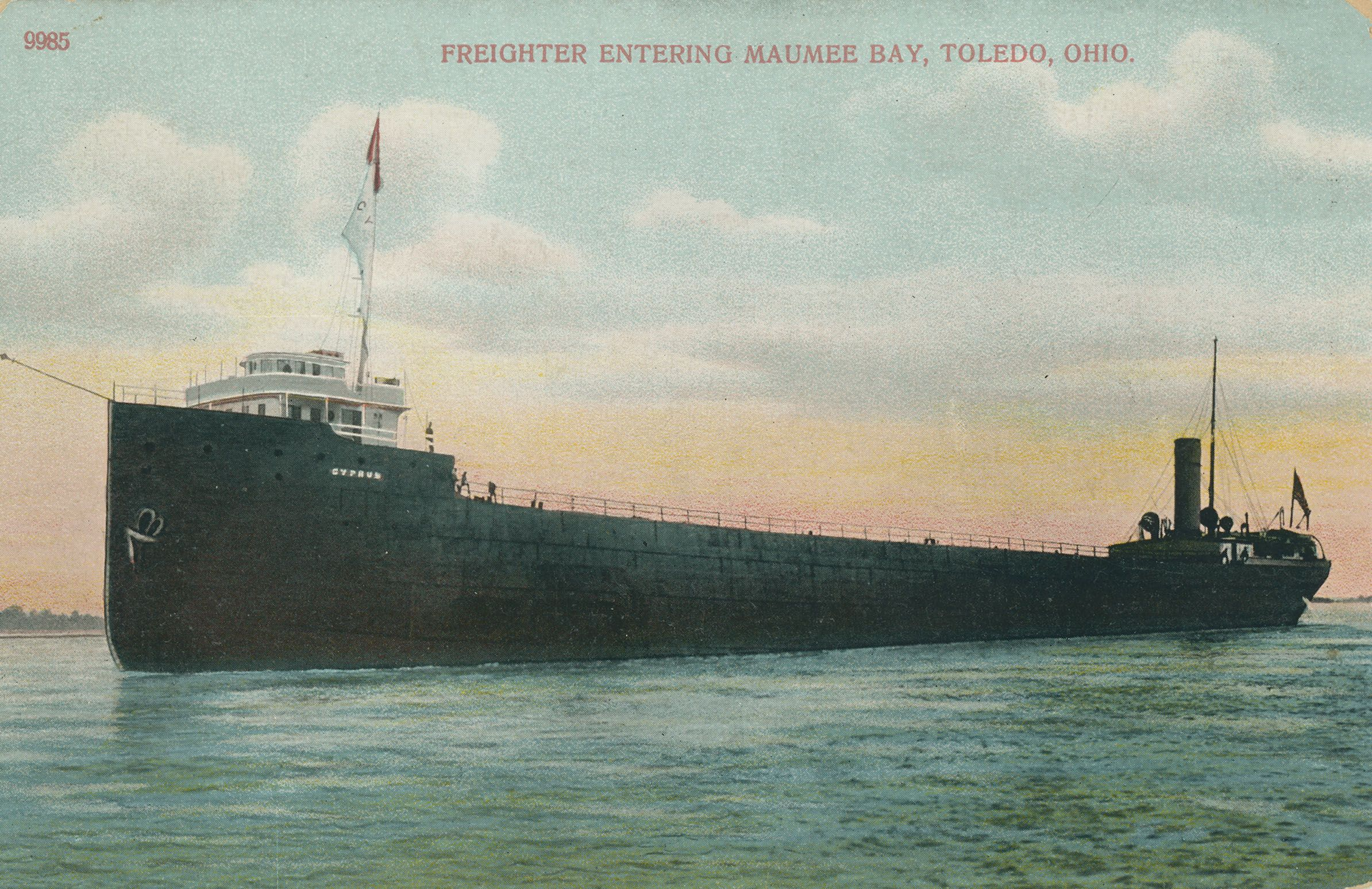
Freighter Entering Maumee Bay, Toledo, Ohio

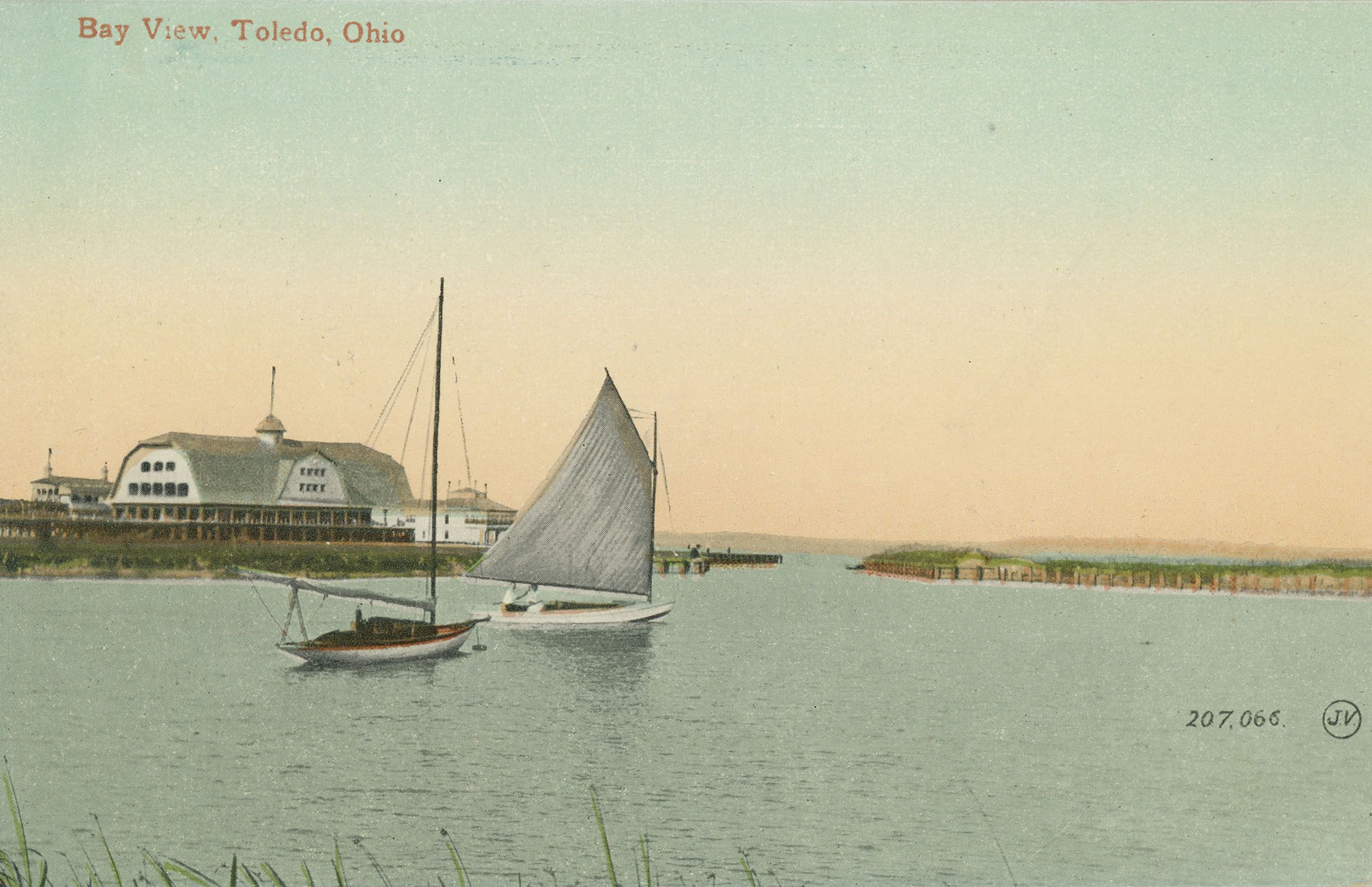
Bay View, Toledo, Ohio

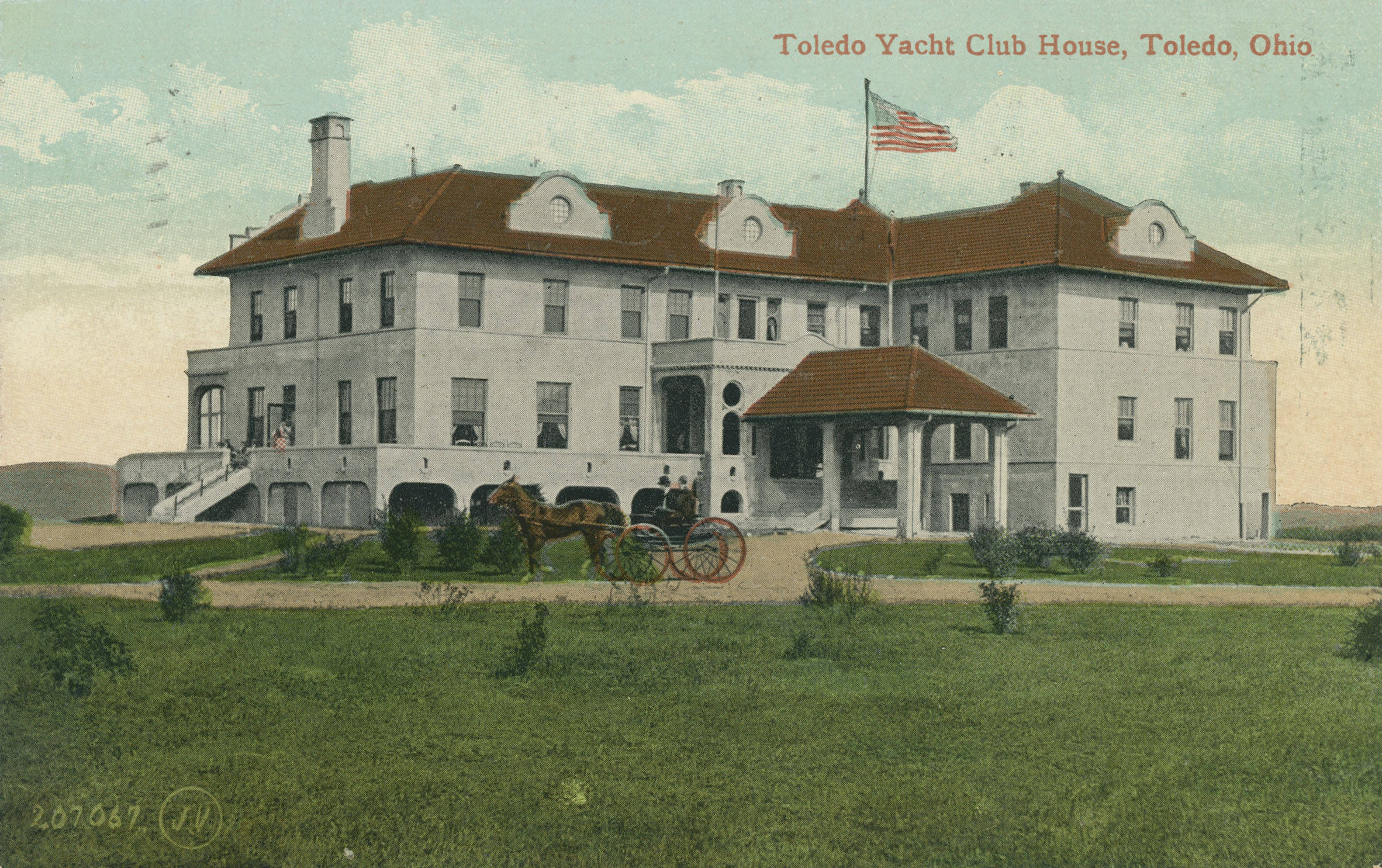
Toledo Yacht Club House, Toledo, Ohio
